= Judenrat in Warsaw =

Jewish council in Nazi-occupied Warsaw during World War II

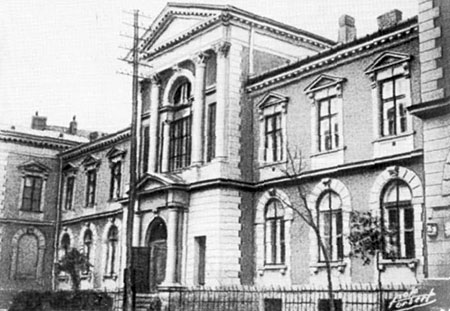
Main building of the Warsaw Jewish Community, headquarters of the Jewish Council until August 1942

The Judenrat in Warsaw, also known as the Jewish Council in Warsaw (German: Judenrat in Warschau; Yiddish: יודענראַט אין וואַרשע or יוד-ראַט אין וואַרשע) was a Judenrat established by the German occupation authorities in October 1939. It was tasked with implementing German directives affecting the Jewish population in Warsaw.

From autumn 1940, following the establishment of the Warsaw Ghetto, the Judenrat assumed responsibility for the ghetto's internal administration. The council was chaired by Adam Czerniaków until his suicide on 23 July 1942, after which Marek Lichtenbaum succeeded him.

The Judenrat operated under strict German supervision and within severe constraints. Initially subordinate to German police authorities, it later fell under civilian administration, represented among others by Heinz Auerswald, who was appointed Commissioner for the Jewish Residential District in May 1941. The council faced intense criticism from Jewish resistance movement, social self-help organizations, and much of the ghetto population. It was accused of corruption, nepotism, incompetence, favoritism toward wealthier residents, promoting assimilationist tendencies, and excessive subservience – or even collaboration – with the occupying authorities. Such criticisms, however, often did not fully account for the extreme conditions and highly limited options available to the Judenrat.

With the commencement of Grossaktion Warsaw in summer 1942, the Judenrat's role and influence diminished significantly. It ceased to function during the suppression of the Warsaw Ghetto Uprising. None of its members survived the war.

== Origins and establishment ==
Nazi Germany's invasion of Poland began on 1 September 1939. In the initial weeks of the occupation, as German forces advanced through Polish territory, members of the Einsatzgruppen systematically established provisional "Jewish councils" (German: Judenrat) in occupied localities. This practice was formalised on 21 September 1939 at a conference convened in Berlin under the direction of SS-Gruppenführer Reinhard Heydrich, attended by senior department heads of the Reich Security Main Office and commanders of Einsatzgruppen deployed in Poland. These directives outlined the establishment, composition, and functions of the Judenräte. The policy of creating Jewish administrative bodies to serve as intermediaries for implementing anti-Jewish measures had previously been applied in Austria following the Anschluss in 1938.

In Warsaw, amid widespread panic and mass evacuation, the president (Note: In September 1936, the first elections in five years were held for the council of the Jewish Religious Community in Warsaw. As a result of political fragmentation and party disputes, the councillors were unable to elect a chairman. Consequently, on 7 January 1937, the Sanation authorities dissolved the existing community leadership and appointed a temporary commissary administration headed by Maurycy Mayzel. This decision was received very negatively by Jewish public opinion, which perceived the authorities' actions as an attempt to limit Jewish self-government (Urynowicz (2009, pp. 155–156)).) of the Jewish community, Maurycy Mayzel, fled the city. Effective authority passed to Adam Czerniaków, a member of the community's provisional board. This arrangement was soon endorsed by Polish authorities. On 20 September, Warsaw's Civil Commissioner, Stefan Starzyński, directed the Jewish community councillors to support Czerniaków as provisional chairman, with Marek Lichtenbaum as deputy. Three days later, Starzyński formally appointed Czerniaków commissary president.

German forces entered Warsaw on 1 October 1939. Accompanying the Wehrmacht units in the city were operatives of Einsatzgruppe IV (EG IV). To establish a Jewish administrative body, they immediately began identifying members of the Jewish elite. For this purpose, among other actions, members of the Zamenhof family were detained and interrogated.

On 4 October, (Note: This date appears in Adam Czerniaków's diary (Fuks (1983, pp. 51–52)). Other authors, drawing on preserved Judenrat documents, dated the first contact between the Germans and the Jewish community to 3 October, and the establishment of the Judenrat to 7 October. In the accounts of some witnesses, other dates appear as well – 5 October, and even 10 or 14 October (Engelking & Leociak (2013, pp. 109, 117); Urynowicz (2009, p. 181)).) several SS officers arrived at the Jewish community headquarters seeking its "administrator." They expelled all Jews from the building, seized the keys, and looted the treasury (approximately 90,000 PLN). Meanwhile, Czerniaków had arrived at the community headquarters to organise the funeral of Samuel Dickstein. Upon being informed of the incident, it was agreed that the community employees would disperse to their homes while Czerniaków entered the building to speak with the Germans. He was detained and taken to the headquarters of EG IV in the building at 25 Jan Szuch Avenue. There, SS-Obersturmbannführer Josef Meisinger ordered him to appoint a 24-member Council of Elders and to assume its leadership.

Czerniaków succeeded in compiling the list of 24 Judenrat members demanded by the Germans. Through his efforts, the initial composition of the Jewish Council included prominent representatives of the Warsaw Jewish community and reflected a relatively broad socio-political spectrum. The date of the official establishment of the Judenrat is given as 6 or 7 October. The official reactivation of the Jewish community and the inaugural meeting of the Judenrat took place in the presence of Germans on 15 October 1939 (according to other sources, on 10 October).

Katarzyna Person states that the decree establishing the Warsaw Judenrat was issued by Governor-General Hans Frank on 28 November 1939. This interpretation is, however, contested by Marcin Urynowicz, who points out that Frank's regulation of that date concerning the creation of Judenräte did not apply to Warsaw and Kraków.

== History ==
=== Tasks and subordination to German authorities ===
For propaganda purposes, the German occupation authorities portrayed the Judenräte as organs of Jewish self-government that represented the Jewish population. In reality, they expected the councils to do nothing more than strictly enforce German orders and regulations directed against Jews. In line with the "leadership principle" (German: Führerprinzip) applied throughout the Third Reich, the chairman of the Jewish Council bore personal responsibility for the functioning of its administrative apparatus. German regulations held him and his deputy accountable for "receiving orders from the German authorities" and for "conscientiously carrying them out in full scope", while requiring "Jews, male and female, to obey instructions issued by the Jewish Council for the purpose of implementing German ordinances".

In the initial period of its activity, the tasks of the Warsaw Judenrat included, among others, conducting a census of the Jewish population and, subsequently, supplying Jewish forced labourers to the German authorities. Its responsibilities also encompassed welfare activities, provisioning, administrative functions, and mediation in establishing craft workshops in the area that would later become the ghetto. The Judenrat was headquartered in the main building of the Jewish Community in Warsaw at 26/28 Grzybowska Street.

During the inaugural meeting of the Warsaw Judenrat, an SS officer (most likely SS-Hauptsturmführer Bernhard Baatz) informed the councillors that they were entirely subordinate to the Sicherheitspolizei and prohibited them from contacting representatives of other occupation authorities. Until January 1940, operatives of Einsatzgruppe IV – and, after its dissolution, the office of the Commander of the Security Police and SD in the Warsaw District (Kommandeur der Sicherheitspolizei und des SD, KdS) – exercised near-absolute control over the Warsaw Judenrat. Initially, the Einsatzgruppe IV officer responsible for "Jewish affairs" was Bernhard Baatz. Later, a dedicated sub-section (IV B 4) for "Jewish affairs" (the so-called Judenreferat) was established within the KdS office, headed successively by Karl Georg Brandt and Gerhard Mende.

At the turn of 1939 and 1940, supervision over the Warsaw Judenrat gradually shifted to the German civilian authorities, though the SS formally accepted this arrangement only in early June 1940. Until October of that year, the Judenrat was subordinate to the German municipal authorities, successively under commissary president of Warsaw, Oskar Rudolf Dengel, and Stadthauptmann Ludwig Leist. At the same time, to Leist's displeasure, officials from the governor's office in the Warsaw District also claimed the right to issue orders to the Jewish Council. Relations between Leist and chairman Adam Czerniaków were generally cordial.

In October 1940, as the process of ghettoising Warsaw's Jews began, authority over the Judenrat passed to the Resettlement Department (German: Umsiedlungsamt) in the office of the governor of the Warsaw District, headed by Waldemar Schön. The branch office of the Umsiedlungsamt in the Warsaw Ghetto, which maintained direct contact with the Judenrat, was the so-called Transfer Office (German: Transferstelle). This body not only issued orders to the Judenrat but also controlled all commodity traffic between the ghetto and the "Aryan side". Relations between Schön and Czerniaków were exceptionally poor; during Schön's tenure, the Judenrat chairman was beaten twice and briefly arrested.

On 15 March 1941, the Umsiedlungsamt was dissolved. Its competencies were redistributed among several departments, and Schön was transferred to head the Internal Affairs Department in the governor's office. After a two-month transitional period – during which Schön unsuccessfully attempted to have his former deputy, Otto Mohns, assume supervision over "Jewish affairs" – Governor Ludwig Fischer appointed Heinz Auerswald as Commissioner for the Jewish Residential District (German: Kommissar für den jüdischen Wohnbezirk) on 14 May 1941. The legal basis was a regulation issued by Governor-General Hans Frank on 19 April 1941, which granted the Judenrat chairman the same rights as the mayor of the Polish district in Warsaw while subordinating him to the German commissioner. The Transferstelle then became an auxiliary organ of the commissioner's office. Czerniaków initially placed some hope in Auerswald's appointment, as the new commissioner – especially compared to Schön – was at first seen as pragmatic and relatively well-disposed toward Jews. For a time, the Judenrat chairman believed he had established a degree of personal understanding with him. Over time, however, Auerswald revealed himself as a careerist and ruthless executor of Nazi anti-Jewish policy.

Meanwhile, the SS continued to interfere in ghetto affairs. Czerniaków was required to appear weekly at the Warsaw KdS office to report to the heads of the Judenreferat, Karl Georg Brandt and Gerhard Mende, accompanied by the commander of the Jewish Ghetto Police, Józef Szeryński. He also occasionally met with other SS functionaries, including the first commanders of the SD and Sicherheitspolizei in Warsaw – Josef Meisinger and Johannes Hermann Müller – as well as the head of the Warsaw SD structures, Dr. Ernst Kah.

In the second half of 1942, with the launch of the "final solution to the Jewish question", the SS regained full authority over Jewish matters. During Grossaktion Warsaw in summer 1942, undivided power in the ghetto was exercised by two German "resettlement staffs": one from Lublin, commanded by SS-Hauptsturmführer Hermann Höfle and composed of SS personnel from the Operation Reinhard staff, and the Warsaw staff, led by Brandt and Mende of the KdS "Jewish section".

After the conclusion of Grossaktion Warsaw, the Transferstelle and the office of the Commissioner for the Jewish Residential District continued to exist for some time; however, the decisive voice in all matters concerning the ghetto henceforth belonged to Brandt and other functionaries of the Warsaw KdS, who operated from the so-called Befehlstelle at 103 Żelazna Street.

=== Relations with the Polish Municipal Administration ===
The ghetto remained connected to the rest of Warsaw through a network of infrastructural, communal, and financial ties. Among other measures, the Polish Municipal Administration partially covered social welfare expenses in the ghetto using funds from the Main Welfare Council, which it administered. In return, ghetto inhabitants were required to pay property taxes, other local taxes and fees, and utility bills for gas, water, electricity, and similar services.

For these reasons, the Judenrat maintained contacts with the Polish Municipal Administration, which managed Warsaw's communal economy under German supervision. Chairman Adam Czerniaków repeatedly met with the commissary mayor Julian Kulski and his subordinates. Relations between Czerniaków and Kulski were very good. Czerniaków accepted the informal primacy of the Municipal Administration over the Judenrat – even after the Germans granted him in 1941 a position formally equivalent to Kulski's. He also sought to demonstrate loyalty to the Polish administration by informing it of his plans.

Employees of municipal technical services held passes allowing entry to the ghetto. Several branches of the Municipal Administration also operated inside the ghetto, including a delegation of the Population Registration Department that certified death certificates issued by Jewish physicians, tax offices responsible for collecting taxes, and – until January 1941 – food ration stamp distribution offices at certain Blue Police precincts.

Conflicts nonetheless arose between the Judenrat and the Municipal Administration, particularly over financial settlements for gas and electricity supplies. The Municipal Administration also obstructed the Judenrat's efforts to secure a share of revenues from taxes and fees paid by Jews. Further disputes occurred in connection with establishing new ghetto boundaries. Czerniaków sought to resolve these conflicts with the Polish administration quickly. From the Municipal Administration's side, however, he did not always encounter an equally open and conciliatory attitude. While Kulski and Czerniaków maintained good personal relations, Kulski's subordinates felt primarily obliged to defend the interests of the ethnically Polish population. This included supporting measures that reduced the Judenrat's income while increasing municipal revenues, as well as advocating for ghetto boundary lines that were as advantageous as possible for Polish residents.

=== Activities ===
==== Before the establishment of the ghetto ====
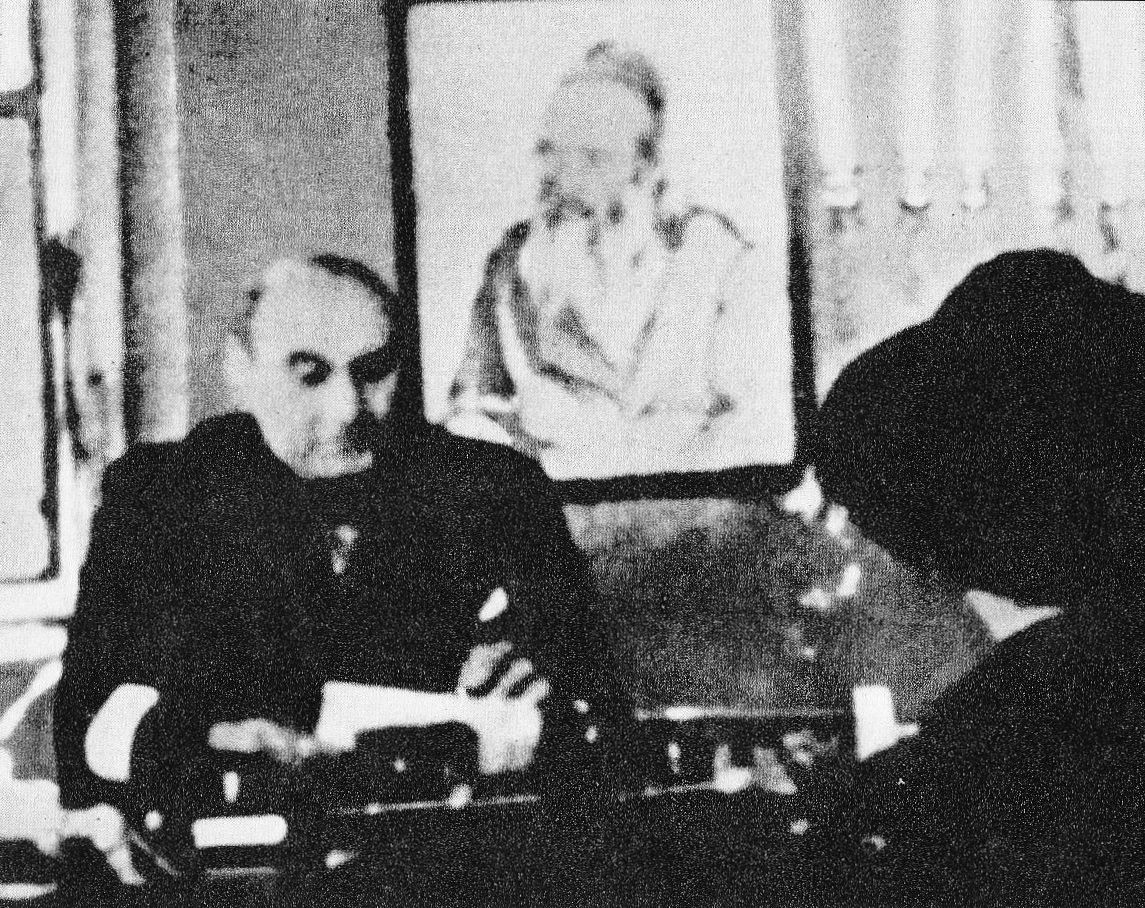
Adam Czerniaków in his office at the Judenrat headquarters

On 28 October 1939, the Central Registration Office within the Statistical Bureau of the Judenrat, conducted the first census of Warsaw's Jewish population on orders from the German authorities, employing 270 people for the task. It established that 359,827 Jews then resided in the city. Further censuses were carried out in February and April 1940.

Once the initial chaos of the occupation had subsided and the uncontrolled plunder of Jewish property carried out by German soldiers, policemen, and civilians had ceased, the Nazi authorities began issuing specific demands to the Judenrat for monetary contributions or goods in kind. On several occasions, the Judenrat was forced to pay ransoms for Jews arrested by German police on various pretexts. In some cases, these payments saved hostages' lives. For instance, in January 1940, a ransom of 100,000 PLN persuaded the Germans to forgo mass reprisals following the alleged beating of a Volksdeutsche by Jews. In May of the same year, also thanks to the payment of ransoms, the Judenrat succeeded in securing the release of 417 Jews from Gęsia Street, who had been arrested following the alleged beating of a Volksdeutscher that had supposedly occurred on that street. Despite intensive efforts and partial payment of the demanded sum, however, the Judenrat could not prevent the execution in November 1939 of 53 men from the building at 9 Nalewki Street, whom the Germans shot in retaliation for the death of a Polish policeman killed by a common criminal. Families of the victims and sections of Jewish public opinion later blamed Chairman Czerniaków for the hostages' deaths, unjustly accusing him of delaying the payment.

In early November 1939, German police authorities made the first attempt to establish a ghetto in Warsaw. To enforce compliance, the SS took 24 Jews as hostages. Through interventions by the Judenrat, including appeals to the city's military commandant, General Neumann-Neurode, the creation of the ghetto was temporarily averted.

On 1 November 1939, the Judenrat was compelled to assume responsibility for maintaining the Main Home for the Elderly and Orphans of the Mosaic Faith, as well as other Jewish welfare institutions. In December of the same year, a Commission for Hospital Affairs was established (renamed the Department for Hospital Affairs in May 1941), which administered the Jewish Hospital and the Bersohn and Bauman Children's Hospital. The Jewish Council also took over management of the Jewish Cemetery and the Bródno Jewish Cemetery, though after the establishment of the Warsaw Ghetto it oversaw only the necropolis in Wola. Responsibility for cemetery administration and burials rested with the Cemetery Department of the Jewish Council.

From the beginning of the occupation, the Judenrat faced a chronic shortage of funds. Resources were insufficient even for essential expenditures, including healthcare. There were also insufficient means to pay salaries to officials. In winter, staff worked in unheated premises due to coal shortages. Conditions were further hampered by power outages, the confiscation of office furniture by occupation authorities in lieu of unpaid taxes, and severe paper shortages that required rationing. Czerniaków attempted to address the budgetary crisis by organising voluntary collections and charitable campaigns while imposing various taxes, fees, and levies on the Jewish population. Collectibility remained low, however, amid the growing pauperisation of Jews.

Between November 1939 and October 1940, approximately 90,000 Jews arrived in Warsaw, expelled from territories incorporated into the Third Reich, primarily from the area of the so-called Wartheland and the Regierungsbezirk Zichenau. At the end of February 1940, transports of Jewish prisoners of war were also directed to the city, followed in August by refugees from Kraków. The Germans obliged the Warsaw Judenrat to house and provide for these expellees and refugees, despite the council's lack of adequate resources. The influx of so many people sharply worsened housing and sanitary conditions in the Jewish district, leading to a typhus epidemic in the first half of 1940.

In autumn 1939, the Jewish Council took the initiative to supply Jewish forced labourers to the Germans, hoping this would reduce the brutal roundups on the streets of the Jewish district. On 19 October of the same year, the so-called Labour Battalion was established to recruit workers and assign them to German-designated sites. Its leadership consisted of Bernard Zundelewicz, Chil Rozen, A. Pożaryk (later replaced by Józef Hasensprung), and Mieczysław Goldfluss. Workers were initially assigned to "posts" at German barracks, offices, enterprises, and similar locations. By autumn 1940, 130 such posts had been created. They operated in Warsaw and its surroundings, including Falenty, Raszyn, Ursus, and along the Błonie road. From summer 1940, the Labour Department also organised the dispatch of Jewish workers to forced labor camps outside Warsaw. Throughout 1940, the Judenrat sent more than 4,000 workers to 30 camps.

The Judenrat tried, as far as possible, to assist Warsaw Jews assigned to labour camps. For this purpose, a special Camp Service Section was established within the Labour Battalion. It handled, among other tasks, the registration of camps and workers, the delivery of food and clothing, and the provision of sanitary and medical care. Collections of money and clothing were also organised for the workers and their families remaining in Warsaw. Chairman Czerniaków further intervened with German authorities over the poor conditions in the camps. Following his efforts, councillors Beniamin Zabłudowski and Gustaw Wielikowski visited labour camps in Roztoka, Narty, Piekło, Wola Miedniewska, Kapituła, and Małszyce in May 1941.

In 1940, between 1,500 and 15,000 workers reported daily to the Labour Department of the Judenrat. As German demands grew and news spread of the appalling conditions and ill-treatment at the "posts" and camps, volunteers soon proved insufficient. The Jewish Council therefore introduced a system of fees for exemption from compulsory labour. The Judenrat's role in supplying contingents of forced labourers led to demonstrations outside its headquarters and a significant deterioration in its image among Warsaw Jews.

Initially, Jewish workers were paid from the Judenrat treasury, in theory receiving a daily wage of 3 PLN, later raised to 4 PLN. It quickly became clear, however, that the Jewish Council lacked sufficient funds to meet these obligations. Incidents arose involving unpaid workers and blockades of offices. In December 1939, the Judenrat imposed an additional tax on Jews to support the Labour Battalion. In April 1940, Adam Czerniaków submitted a memorandum to the German authorities on further financing. In August of the same year, the Main Labour Department in the General Government administration relieved the Judenrat of the obligation to pay workers, transferring it to German employers. This provision, however, remained largely unimplemented, and Jewish workers received no wages from either the Judenrat or the Germans. By the end of 1940, more than 70% of Jewish workers at Warsaw posts were working without pay.

On 16 January 1940, commissary president Oskar Rudolf Dengel issued an order for the registration of all Jewish males between the ages of 12 and 60. The Judenrat carried out the registration, employing nearly one thousand officials. After the initial census, instructions arrived requiring the registration of tools owned by Jews as well, leading to a repeated census that was finally completed on 26 March 1940. The data served to issue individual work orders to Jews. From 11 December 1939, the Registration and Reporting Department of the Judenrat also maintained a register of all Jews arriving in Warsaw.

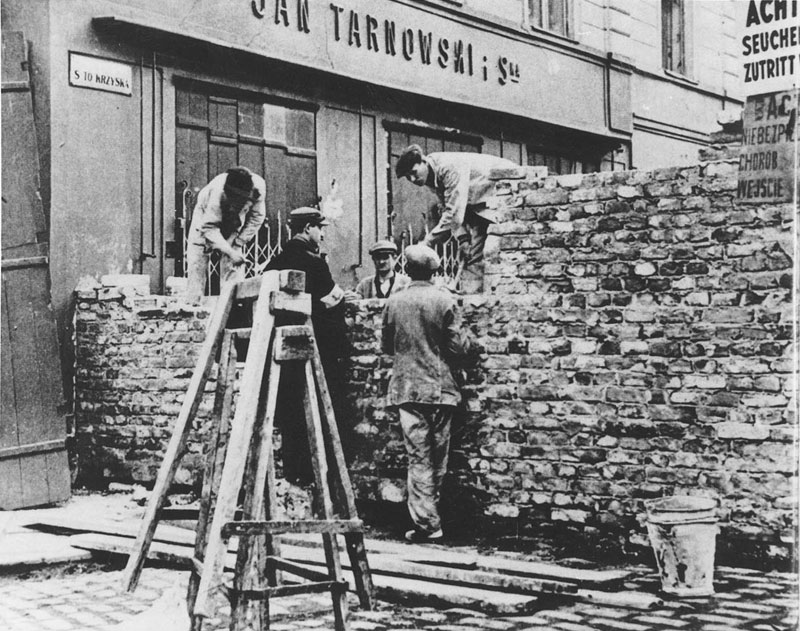
Construction of walls around the future ghetto. Świętokrzyska Street in Warsaw, 1940

On 27 March 1940, the Judenrat received an order to erect walls around the "epidemic-threatened area" (German: Seuchensperrgebiet), the official designation for the northern district intended to form part of the planned ghetto. Construction of walls around the future closed district began a few days later, on 1 April. The work was managed by the Technical and Construction Section of the Economic Department of the Judenrat, with all costs borne by the Jewish Council. The walls and warning signs were completed in June 1940.

In spring 1940, the Jewish Council became the owner of a kibbutz – an agricultural farm established in 1919 by the HeHalutz organization in Grochów. The kibbutz had one cow and one horse; it cultivated vegetables and grain, and also operated a jam and preserve factory. Part of the produce was sold, while the rest was allocated to welfare institutions of Jewish Social Self-Help and partly to CENTOS. On 15 November of the same year, the kibbutz was closed and its inhabitants transferred to the ghetto. Following interventions by Dror activists (including Zivia Lubetkin) with the Judenrat, they secured permission to return. In June 1941, the Commissary Administration of Secured Properties took over the kibbutz, though Heinz Auerswald allowed 21 kibbutzniks to remain on site, working under the supervision of a German administrator. The Zionist pioneering movement activists were ultimately removed from the kibbutz at the beginning of 1942.

From July 1940, the Jewish Council organized artisanal workshops known as "shops" (German: Schops), which fulfilled orders for German enterprises, primarily the Wehrmacht. The shops were established on the initiative of the Union of Jewish Artisans or other organizations (including HeHalutz), and supervised on behalf of the Jewish Council by officials of the Production Department. They were structured either as cooperatives or as manufactories with hired labour; most organizers chose the latter model, which drew criticism from left-wing circles. Conditions in the shops were extremely harsh: workers often laboured 12 hours a day and suffered hunger and exploitation. They received a daily wage of 6.40 PLN, from which the cost of issued soup was deducted. This wage allowed the purchase on the black market of roughly a quarter kilogram of bread. Initially, the shops struggled with a lack of orders, meaning workers often came only to collect food rations and spent the rest of the day idle. The situation improved in late spring and summer 1941, when orders increased and the shops became more important to the ghetto economy. Even so, they provided livelihoods for only a small portion of the population – in September 1941, 3,055 people were employed in them. Over time, German entrepreneurs began opening their own establishments or taking over Jewish ones; former Jewish owners and managers remained as managers or workers. Previously, German entrepreneurs had acted as subcontractors. According to the definition of Barbara Engelking and Jacek Leociak, "shops" were large enterprises that, under the pretext of leasing, absorbed existing Jewish establishments and workshops in the ghetto.

In September 1940, a School Commission was established under the Judenrat to develop curricula for Jewish schools that members hoped would soon open. The lack of German permission and the subsequent creation of the ghetto led the commission to suspend its activities in November 1940. Earlier, in August 1940, the German authorities had permitted the Jewish Council to conduct vocational courses. As a result, a Vocational Training Department was created within the Judenrat that summer. Between September 1940 and the end of December 1941, the Judenrat organized 140 courses attended by 6,291 people.

In July 1940, the largest numbers of Judenrat employees worked at the Jewish Hospital (637) and in the Labour Battalion (453); in total, more than 1,500 people were employed across Judenrat structures. The expansion of staff and creation of new posts stemmed from Czerniaków's efforts to provide livelihoods for Jewish intellectuals and artists left unemployed, as well as to offer protection against deportation to labour camps.

Even before the ghetto's establishment, the Judenrat operated two medical outpatient clinics, located on Grzybowska Street and Nowiniarska Street. The clinic on Grzybowska Street continued its activities inside the ghetto.

==== From the establishment of the ghetto to Grossaktion Warsaw ====
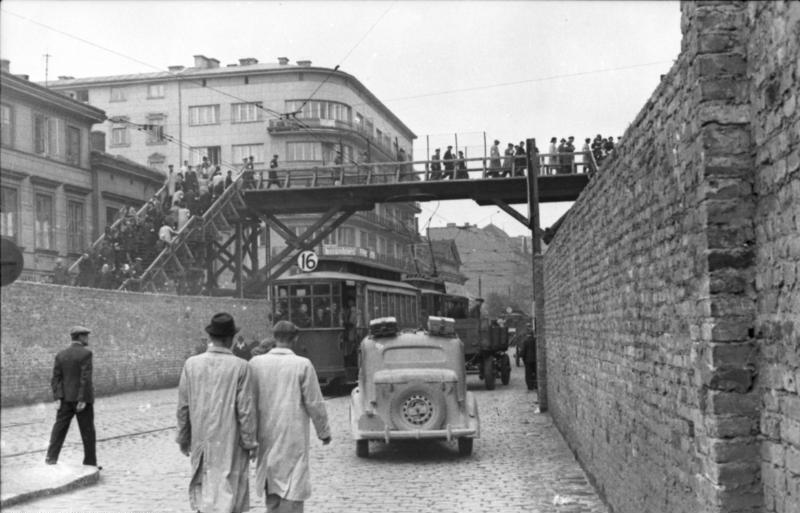
Wooden bridge over Chłodna Street

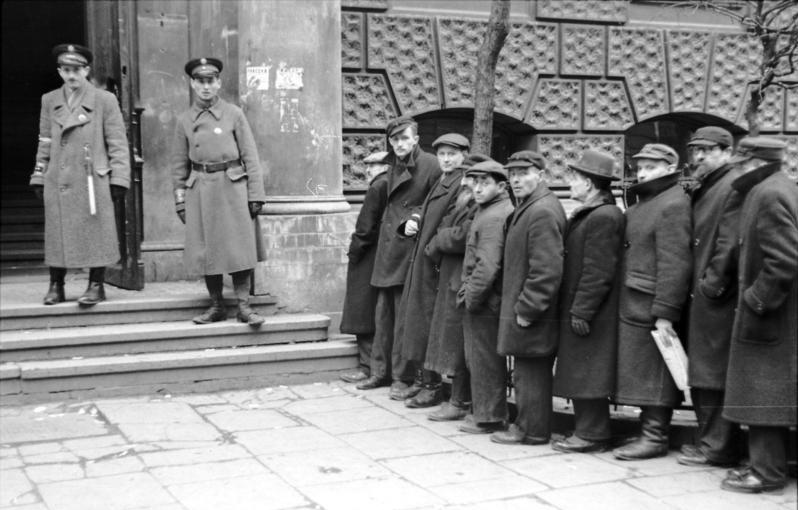
Jewish Ghetto Police officers and a crowd in front of the headquarters of the Production Department of the Jewish Council at 14/16 Prosta Street

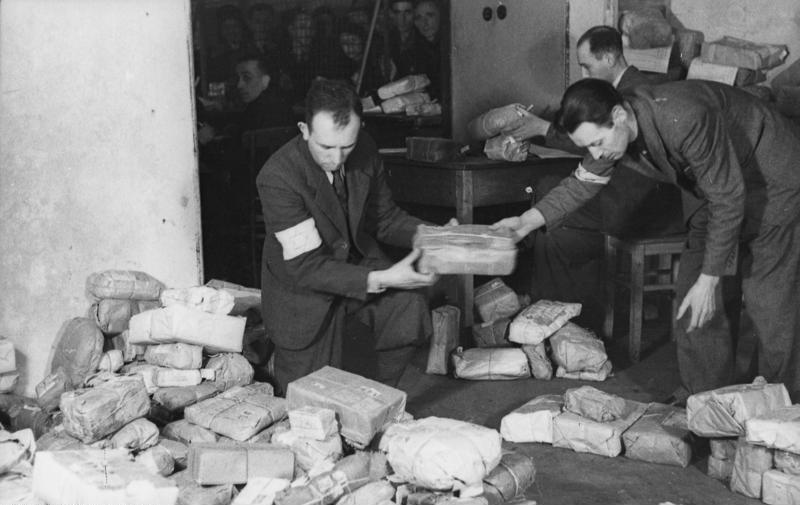
Employees of the Warsaw Ghetto post office

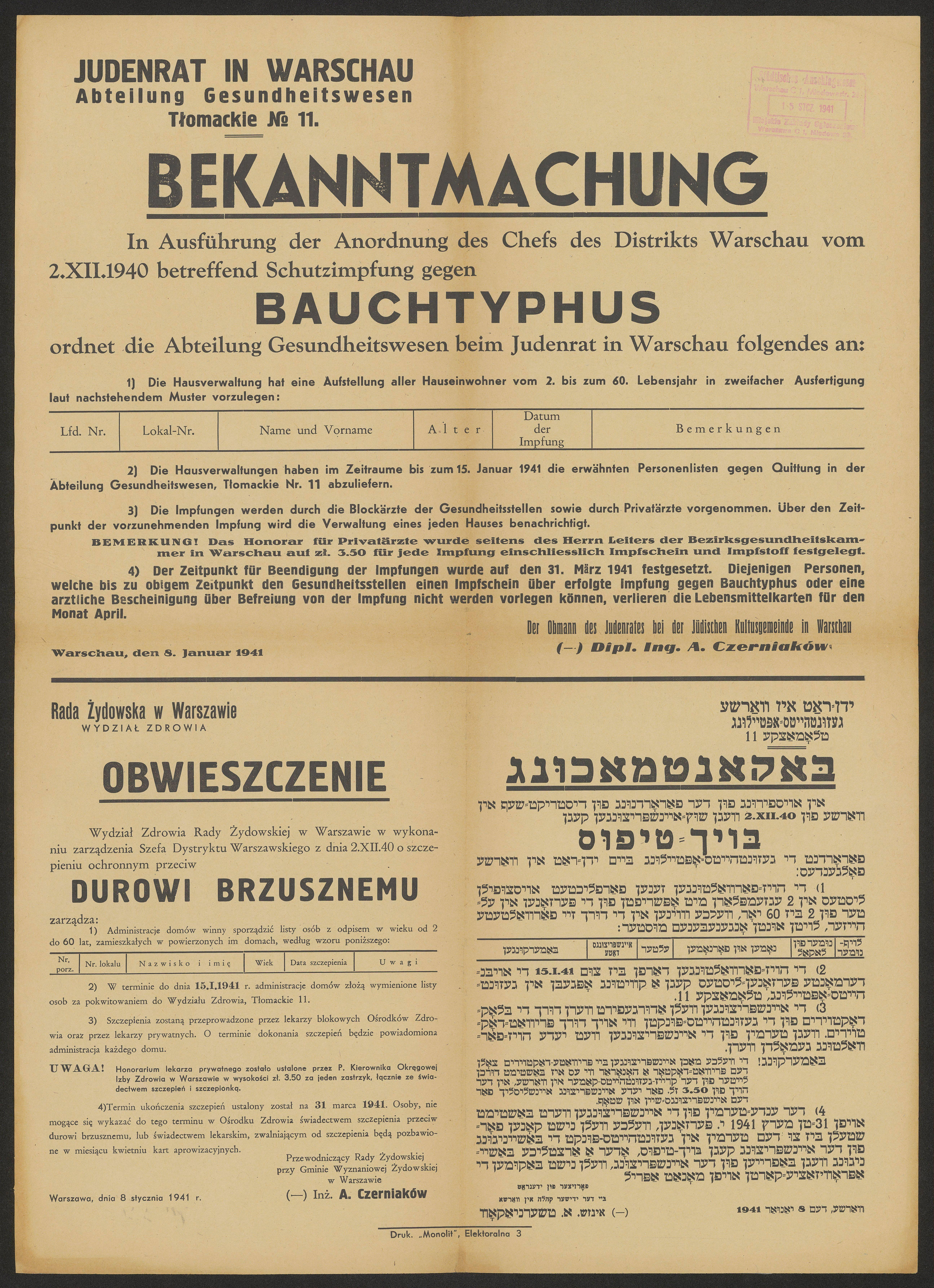
Announcement of the Health Department of the Jewish Council concerning typhoid vaccinations, January 1941

On 2 October 1940, the governor of the Warsaw District, Ludwig Fischer, signed the order establishing the Warsaw Ghetto. It was announced via street loudspeakers on 12 October. Soon afterwards, a wave of internal resettlements forced approximately 138,000 Jews and 113,000 Poles to change residence. The ghetto was sealed on 16 November. The subcontractor responsible for constructing the walls around the ghetto was the Lichtenbaum family firm; one of its members, Marek Lichtenbaum, also served as a Judenrat councillor. The Judenrat bore the entire cost of the wall construction, amounting to 1,309,559.71 PLN.

After the ghetto boundaries were altered in autumn 1941, the Judenrat supervised the reconstruction of the walls, entrusting the task to engineer Pożaryk. The Technical and Construction Section of the Judenrat also oversaw the building of bridges connecting ghetto sections separated by "Aryan streets": over Mławska Street (February 1941), over Przebieg Street (June 1941), over Żelazna Street (November 1941), and the largest – over Chłodna Street at its intersection with Żelazna Street (December 1941–January 1942).

With the ghetto's establishment, non-Jewish property administrators left the area. The newly created Department for Secured Properties of the Judenrat assumed building management, appointing administrators for individual buildings, block superintendents (overseeing several buildings), and commissioners (responsible for 10 to 15 buildings). These positions were considered lucrative, and their allocation involved numerous abuses. Certain properties along Leszno Street and some side streets passed to a special plenipotentiary independent of the Judenrat, Abraham Gancwajch.

Following the ghetto's creation, the Jewish Ghetto Police subordinate to the Judenrat was established; by summer 1942, it employed around 2,000 people.

In autumn 1940, Group 13 was formed as the only institution in the ghetto not subordinate to the Judenrat. Its head, Abraham Gancwajch, repeatedly attempted to seize power in the ghetto. There were apparently considerations to appoint him deputy chairman of the Judenrat; rumours even circulated that he might take over leadership entirely.

On 4 November 1940, a group of German soldiers burst into Judenrat headquarters, assaulting everyone present. Adam Czerniaków was severely beaten, arrested, and imprisoned in Pawiak prison, but released the following day.

In December 1940, the Supply Institution was established to handle the import, storage, and distribution of contingent and rationed goods in the ghetto. It was headed by councillor Abraham Gepner. In September 1941, the institution gained significant independence from the Judenrat through a separate statute.

On 1 January 1941, the Judenrat took over food ration stamp distribution from the Polish Municipal Administration. Six District Food Ration Stamp Distribution Offices were created for this purpose. The stamps carried a special tax paid to the block superintendent: 2 PLN for the Judenrat, 0.30 PLN for the Supply Institution, up to 0.30 PLN for the register keeper, and occasionally additional fees (e.g., for rubbish removal). The poorest Jews were exempt. Due to widespread fraud in stamp collection, the Judenrat established the Social Commission for the Control of Food Ration Stamp Distribution in summer 1941.

On 15 January 1941, the Judenrat assumed operation of postal services within the ghetto. German Ostpost delivered parcels and letters to an exchange station at 19 Ludwik Zamenhof Street. The same building housed the Postal Parcel Receiving Office, directed by Nachum Jaszuński until July 1942, when Michał Merliński took over. Postmen from the Jewish Council collected items at the station and transferred them to the Jewish District Postal Depot. Parcels were sorted at 20 Ciepła Street, while letters were handled at 32 Krochmalna Street. In June 1941 alone, the postal service delivered over 113,000 items to ghetto residents; in the first half of 1942, between 10,000 and 13,000 letters were sent monthly from the ghetto. The Judenrat covered all postal expenses, so services incurred additional fees. Postal items were subject to censorship at an office on 27 Grzybowska Street, supervised by Judenrat officials and SD functionaries.

In January 1941, the Industrial and Commercial Department was established to issue craft cards and grant concessions and licences for economic activity in the ghetto. All Jewish craftsmen were required to join the Union of Jewish Craftsmen. The following month, the Production Department was created to organise large workshops fulfilling Wehrmacht orders on instructions from the Transferstelle.

Also in January 1941, the Complaints and Reclamation Control Department – chaired by Bernard Zundelewicz – was established to receive and examine complaints against the activities and decisions of Judenrat organs. According to Gazeta Żydowska, it had examined 286 complaints by June 1941.

Between January and March 1941, nearly 50,000 expellees arrived from the western Warsaw District. As early as January, a Refugee Section was promptly created under the Judenrat, and – together with ŻKOM and ŻTOS – a Commission for Resettlement Affairs chaired by Stanisław Szereszewski. The role of the Judenrat in assisting refugees and expellees remained limited compared to social organisations; by autumn 1941, only 48 of 148 shelters were under its control. Despite efforts, the situation of expellees – stripped of possessions and often unable to find housing or work – remained dire. A much larger typhus epidemic broke out in spring 1941.

On 1 January 1941, a Health Department headed by Izrael Milejkowski was created, overseeing six health centres, six pharmacies, and six sanitary districts. On 1 February, a Collection Office for the Social Insurance Institution was established on German orders to collect contributions, though benefit payments to Jews had already been blocked. That month, the Health Department and the Industrial and Commercial Department planned a Chemical-Bacteriological Institute in the Health Insurance Fund building at 34 Pańska Street, initiated by Zofia Sara Syrkin-Binsztejnowa. It began operations in June 1941 (or July, per some sources) under director Mieczysław Centnerszwer, examining food, testing for typhus, and evaluating vaccines. Chairman Czerniaków allocated 5,000 PLN and ordered a collection of specialist literature.

In February 1941, the Banking Clearing Office was established to handle Judenrat financial operations with external entities. In January 1942, it became the Cooperative Bank of the Jewish District, expanding to service shops among other functions. It was led by a 15-member council chaired by councillor Edward Kobryner.

Also in February 1941, the Judenrat learned of German demands for 23,000 workers for Warsaw District and 12,000 for camps in the Lublin District. A Committee for Labour Camps, headed by Gustaw Wielikowski and comprising three Judenrat members and 18 social activists, was formed to deliver the required contingents and organise relief efforts. It included four commissions: recruitment and reclamation, financial, camp assistance, and personnel. The first transports departed in April, with 2,000 men volunteering – mostly expellees hoping to return to their home regions by choosing their work sites. The volunteers were to be sent to camps in Łowicz, Szymanów, Garwolin, Mordy, Żyrardów, Skierniewice and Sosnów. In subsequent days, however, recruitment failed: neither volunteers nor those compulsorily designated reported. The German authorities threatened to halt all food supplies to the ghetto and convert existing labour camps into penal camps with stricter regimes if the Judenrat did not meet the quota. To secure the required numbers, roundups were organised on ghetto streets – initially by German police and the Blue Police, later by the Jewish Ghetto Police. The latter's involvement drew sharp criticism to both the policemen and the Judenrat as a whole. Victims of the roundups included, among others, people caught in the courtyard of the community building. From May, the Jewish Ghetto Police conducted roundups, including at refugee points. Eyewitness accounts describe how these operations – starting around 14 May – paralysed ghetto life, as officers ignored identity documents and blocked entire streets and blocks. In response, a delegation of policemen approached the Judenrat, stating they did not wish to participate in roundups. According to Ringelblum, several officers who extorted bribes during these actions were compulsorily sent to camps. Workers were also obtained by dispatching Jews caught for minor offences, and the Judenrat planned to oblige House Committees to supply quotas.

On 1 April 1941, under an agreement between the Jewish Council and the Warsaw Chamber of Pharmacy, the council took over the operation of 12 pharmacies in the ghetto and established a Pharmacy Department. A Pharmaceutical Inspectorate was also created. The pharmacies transferred all revenue to the department, which was responsible for supplies but could not meet the overwhelming demand. Meanwhile, the Judenrat imposed a 40% tax on medicine prices, significantly reducing accessibility for poorer residents.

To fund health services, the Judenrat introduced compulsory contributions and fees, administered by the Hospital Affairs Department established in May 1941. These included an April 1941 fee for combating infectious diseases and a compulsory hospital collection in September. Resources remained inadequate, however, and in July 1941 a violent conflict broke out between the Judenrat and the staff of the Jewish Hospital, which demanded payment of overdue salaries.

On 21 May 1941, Adam Czerniaków and Gustaw Wielikowski – adviser to the Jewish Social Self-Help (ŻSS) for the head of the Warsaw District – were summoned to a meeting with Governor Ludwig Fischer and Heinz Auerswald, the newly appointed Commissioner for the Jewish Residential District. During the discussion, the Germans assured them that it was not their aim to starve the Jews and that, given the catastrophic situation in the ghetto, Jewish welfare organisations would receive additional food so as to ensure the daily distribution of 120,000 meals to Warsaw Jews. Under these circumstances, the Feeding Action was launched. Organizational matters were managed by the Dispositional Commission, established in June 1941 under the chairmanship of the head of the Jewish Council; it consisted of Gustaw Wielikowski (commission chairman and newly appointed head of the Social Welfare Department), Henryk Rottenberg (technical manager), Abraham Gepner and Stanisław Szereszewski, while the whole operation was supervised by Auerswald.

The Feeding Action involved standardizing public kitchens – which had until then operated under the patronage of various groups and social organisations – and placing them under Judenrat control. From June to August 1941, 500 tons of oats, 50 tons of sugar, and 8 tons of rapeseed oil were delivered monthly to the ghetto for social welfare institutions. The action resulted in a sharp increase in the number of meals served in public kitchens; it also enabled the opening of additional kitchens, including those for officials, policemen, and workers. In August, only oats were delivered to the ghetto, and in September no deliveries took place at all. Wielikowski travelled to Kraków with letters of recommendation from Auerswald in an attempt to intervene with the General Government administration, but to no avail. In September, the Germans ultimately withdrew from the Feeding Action, probably in connection with decisions then being made regarding the "final solution to the Jewish question". In October, only 100,000 meals were issued, and in November – 87,000. At the beginning of 1942, to secure funding for public kitchens, the Judenrat introduced a consumption tax on rationed goods. Nevertheless, the number of meals served never returned to the level of summer 1941. Moreover, prices doubled and quality deteriorated dramatically.

Faced with widespread hunger in the ghetto, the Judenrat attempted to curb ostentatious consumption. In April 1942, on Czerniaków's orders, Jewish Ghetto Police officers conducted a "raid" on shops displaying luxury food items. Shortly afterwards, a similar requisition took place in restaurants frequented by ghetto prominents. Czerniaków directed that the confiscated foodstuffs be transferred to orphanages and shelters or distributed to street children.

At the beginning of 1940, Jews were prohibited from publicly practising religious worship. In the autumn of the same year, the Germans discovered illegal prayer houses operating in the Jewish district, and as a result Chairman Czerniaków received a reprimand. In April 1941, however, restrictions on Jewish religious practice were partially lifted. On orders from the German authorities, the Judenrat established Saturday as the official day of rest in the ghetto. On 1 June of that year, the Great Synagogue on Tłomackie Street was solemnly reopened with Czerniaków in attendance. Over time, two additional synagogues and five mikvehs were also opened. In August 1941, the Department for Religious Affairs and the Rabbinate under the Judenrat were reactivated, allowing religious life in the ghetto to be conducted within open institutional frameworks. The Department for Religious Affairs took over the responsibilities of the Department for Vital Records, handling, among other matters, marriages, divorces, and the issuance of certificates for deaths or missing people.

In June 1941, the Judenrat received an order to establish a prison in the ghetto. The German order was conveyed to the council by Major Franciszek Przymusiński of the Blue Police. Accordingly, the Judenrat created the Central Arrest at Gęsia Street. It was directed by Leopold Lindenfeld, with a staff drawn from Jewish Ghetto Police officers. The prison held individuals who had committed offences within the ghetto, as well as others who had come into conflict with the Jewish Ghetto Police.

In June 1941, 3,788 people were employed in the Judenrat.

On 15 August 1941, the Industrial and Commercial Department established a private limited company – the Society for the Supply of Products of Jewish Industry (TODOS), whose shareholders were the Union of Merchants and the Union of Craftsmen. It took over the workshops previously managed by the Industrial and Commercial Department, focusing on cooperation with home workers and small craftsmen. The following day, the Judenrat founded the company "Jewish Production", which in turn assumed control of the workplaces run by the Production Department. This company was subsequently taken over by the German entrepreneur Walter Caspar Többens. In November 1941, the "Model Workshop of Jewish Production" opened in the premises of the Industrial and Commercial Department, showcasing the ghetto's productive capacities with approximately 400 exhibits. To expand the shops operated by the Jewish Council, councillor Chil Rozen proposed, among other measures, revoking permits for private craft workshops in order to compel craftsmen to seek employment in the shops. In July 1942, shops were also opened within the Central Arrest, turning it into a labour camp. This measure, however, was primarily propagandistic.

At the turn of August and September 1941, an advisory body was established under the Health Department of the Judenrat: the Central Health Council, chaired by Ludwik Hirszfeld. As a Jewish convert, his appointment provoked considerable controversy in medical circles, though some physicians previously associated with Judenrat structures received it with enthusiasm. The council's primary task was to coordinate the fight against the typhus epidemic.

On 5 September 1941, after prolonged efforts, the Judenrat obtained permission from the German authorities to open elementary schools in the ghetto. (Note: According to some sources, the schools were not opened earlier due to a typhus epidemic prevailing in the ghetto; after they were eventually opened, it turned out that impoverished ghetto residents could not afford to send their children there, while wealthier families feared their children's contact with those from poorer households (Stone & Lehnstaedt (2023, p. 173)).) That same month, a School Department was created within its structures. It organised the opening elementary schools and also absorbed the responsibilities of the Vocational Training Department. Several elementary schools operated under its auspices, with instruction in Yiddish, Hebrew, or Polish. The School Commission, which had been suspended in November 1940, was reactivated and resumed developing curriculum guidelines for ghetto schools. Judenrat expenditure on education amounted to 40,000 PLN monthly, rising to 60,000 PLN monthly from May 1942. These funds supported, among other things, meals for pupils. Czerniaków, who had been a teacher in his youth, took a strong personal interest in educational matters; on his orders, additional food portions were provided to children at the end of the 1941/42 school year.

Chairman Czerniaków sought, where possible, to support artists and intellectuals confined in the ghetto, often by commissioning specific works from them. Among these commissions were a portrait of himself by painter Roman Kramsztyk and stained glass windows by Józef Śliwniak, which were installed in his office and the Judenrat's reception hall. In spring 1941, the Jewish Council secured permission from German authorities to establish bookshops, reading rooms, and libraries in the ghetto. In May of that year, it also obtained approval to open two cinemas, though this plan was never realized – likely because the intended venues had been repurposed as shelters for refugees and deportees. Czerniaków served as honorary president of the patronage committee for the Jewish Symphony Orchestra, while his wife, Felicja Czerniaków, acted as chairwoman.

The Judenrat worked to sustain cultural life in the ghetto, at times collaborating with social organizations and at others competing with them. In October 1941, a Department for Culture and Art was created within its structures. Shortly thereafter, German authorities ordered the Judenrat to assume full control over cultural activities in the ghetto. In January 1942 (or April, according to some sources), a Performances Section was established under the Jewish Council. It took over the responsibilities of the Central Events Commission, previously affiliated with the Jewish Social Self-Help organization (ŻTOS). In principle, only theaters and venues registered with this section were allowed to operate, and it reviewed performance programs, though its regulations likely had limited effect on unofficial cultural activities.

On 26 November 1941, the second Winter Relief Action was launched, organized jointly by the Judenrat, ŻKOM, ŻTOS and CENTOS. This followed a similar initiative in January of the same year. Its goals included fundraising for clothing, producing wooden-soled shoes, and opening soup kitchens and cafés. Aid distribution was managed through house committees. During the campaign, particularly in December 1941, around 40 tons of potatoes were distributed to the poorest families in the ghetto, along with approximately 1,500 pairs of shoes. Two public kitchens and cafés were opened and saw high attendance. On 4 February 1942, an emergency care centre for children at risk of freezing was also established. Overall, the action collected 6,000 clothing items, 2,500 pairs of shoes, and 628,821 PLN, while also supporting numerous cultural and charitable events.

From December 1941, the Jewish Council became responsible for collecting state taxes. Between December 1941 and January 1942, the Judenrat was forced to conduct the so-called "fur action", requisitioning fur garments from Jews for German troops on the Eastern Front. On 9 January 1942, a second such action required the delivery of 1,500 sheepskin coats in exchange for the release of Jewish prisoners from the Central Detention Facility. In March, 411 prisoners were freed following the surrender of these items.

After the ghetto's sealing in November 1940, the rubbish removal from its territory was probably temporarily suspended. In early 1941, the Judenrat issued an invitation to tender for waste collection in the ghetto, which was won by the firm St. Heymann and Co. (likely linked to the Group 13). In practice, the company's workers focused primarily on smuggling, leaving rubbish and waste to accumulate for weeks or even months. By early 1942, Czerniaków reassigned sanitation duties to the Rubbish Section within the Department for Secured Properties. In March 1942, the Health Department issued regulations requiring building administrators and residents to maintain cleanliness. That spring, oversight of waste removal and the renamed St. Heymann and Co. Rubbish Removal Enterprise (transformed into a shop) passed to the Department for Secured Properties of the Judenrat. On 1 June 1942, the Jewish Council formally assumed responsibility for ghetto sanitation from the Polish municipal authorities.

In February 1942, a group of Jewish physicians secretly initiated the Warsaw Ghetto hunger study, without the knowledge of German authorities. The project was led by Izrael Milejkowski, head of the Judenrat's Health Department. It received personal patronage from the chairman of the Judenrat, Adam Czerniaków, and the director of the Supply Institution, Abraham Gepner.

In April 1942, approximately 4,000 Jews from Germany were deported to the Warsaw Ghetto. The Judenrat made efforts to secure housing for them, though some ghetto residents criticized these actions, perceiving that the council showed greater concern for the newcomers than for long-term inhabitants in need.

On 12 April 1942, under the patronage of the Jewish Council, the Teachers' Training Institution, also known as the Pedagogium, was established. It offered courses for educators: three-month refresher programs for practicing teachers and one-year courses for secondary school graduates and those with prior teacher training. In circles associated with the Tkuma organization, the Pedagogium was seen as a revival of the pre-war Institute of Jewish Studies. The institution comprised two departments: natural sciences and mathematics (headed by Bruno Winawer) and the Judaic-pedagogical studies (headed by Edmund Stein). Lecturers included, among others, Meir Balaban, Emanuel Ringelblum, Ignacy Schiper, Eliezer Lipe Bloch, Natan Eck, Meir Tauber, Estera Markin, Hillel Seidman and Szymon Rundstein. However, Chaim Aron Kaplan accused the Pedagogium leadership of incompetence and pretension. The Judaic department attracted limited interest, as its qualifications offered little practical value for employment in the ghetto, and some lecturers lacked broad trust among students.

On the night of 17–18 April 1942, Gestapo officers murdered 52 people on the ghetto streets. In response, Chairman Czerniaków unsuccessfully demanded that Maurycy Orzech and Emanuel Ringelblum suspend the distribution of underground press. Additionally, on his instructions, the Jewish Ghetto Police issued a public statement describing the German operation as "sporadic" and aimed at punishing those "meddling in matters not their own", while calling on residents to remain calm.

In spring 1942, the Judenrat began establishing playgrounds at various locations in the ghetto. Chairman Czerniaków took particular care to ensure that their openings were marked by formal ceremonies.

According to figures published in Gazeta Żydowska on 3 June 1942, the Judenrat and its affiliated institutions then employed around 4,600 people, including 2,600 in health services. Economic enterprises under the council employed an additional 600, while the Jewish Ghetto Police numbered about 2,000 officers.

==== From Grossaktion Warsaw to the ghetto uprising ====
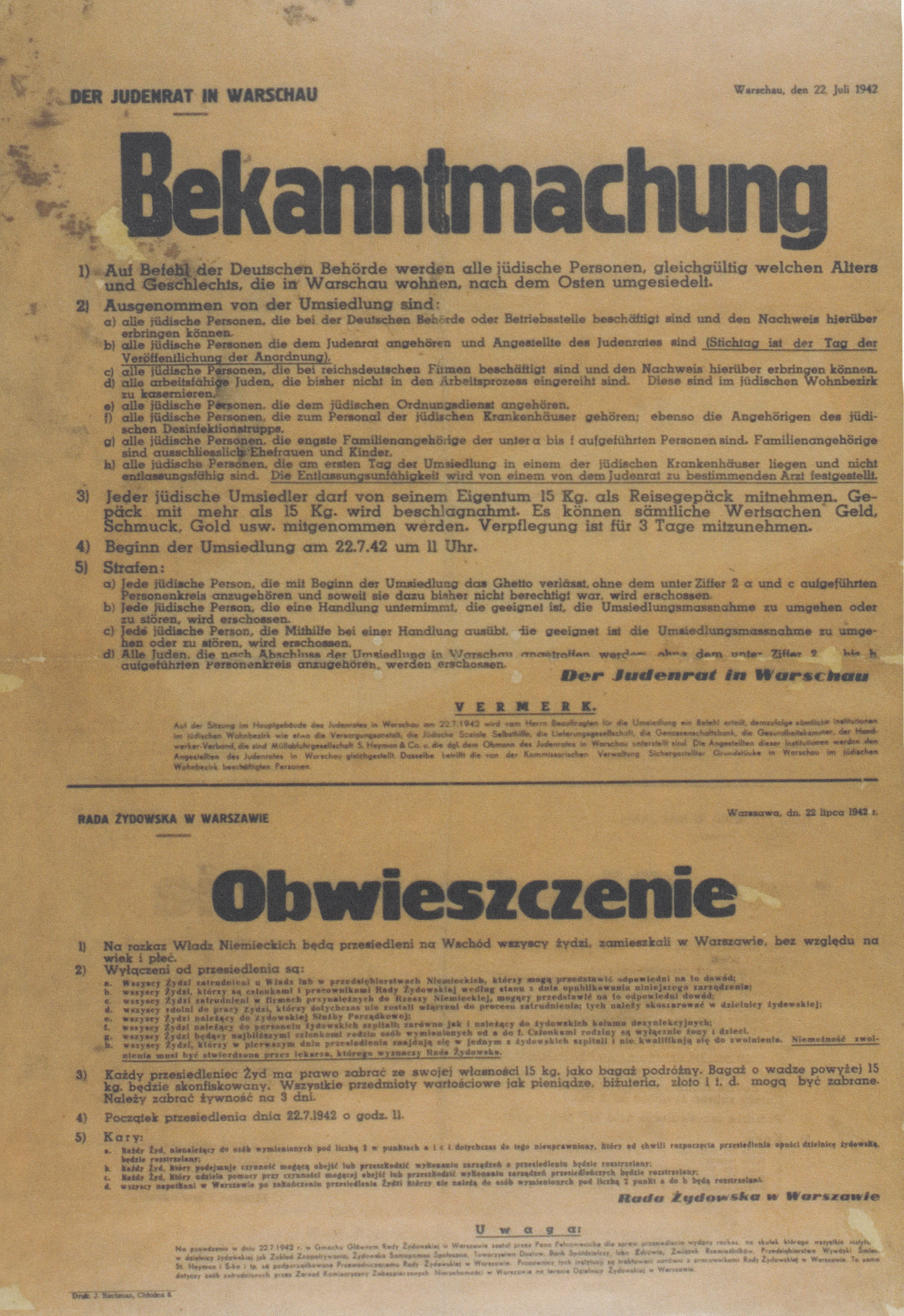
Announcement by the Warsaw Judenrat of 22 July 1942, issued on German orders, announcing the beginning of "resettlement to the East"

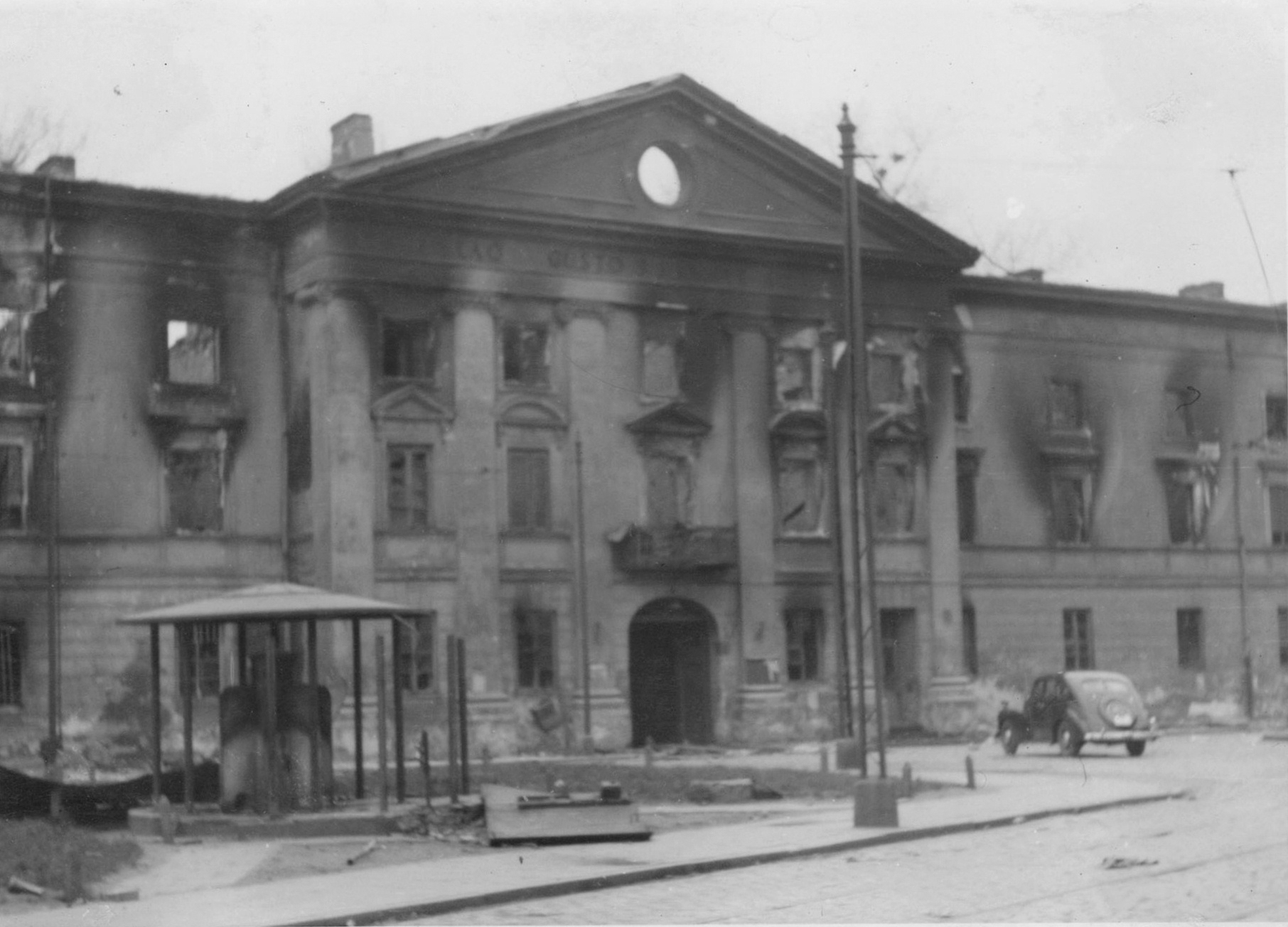
Building of the Volhynia Barracks, headquarters of the Jewish Council from August 1942 until the Warsaw Ghetto Uprising. Photo taken during the uprising

On 22 July 1942, Germans authorities launched the large-scale deportation operation in the Warsaw Ghetto. That day, the first transport to the Treblinka extermination camp departed from the Umschlagplatz. The Judenrat was required to notify the population of the impending "resettlement" and to supply 6,000 people daily to the Umschlagplatz. The Jewish Ghetto Police served as the primary executive body for conducting the deportations. Several council members, including Abraham Gepner, were taken as hostages. Czerniaków and the other councillors were warned that any sabotage of German orders would result in execution. Additionally, SS-Hauptsturmführer Hermann Höfle, head of the "resettlement staff" dispatched from Lublin, threatened Czerniaków that his wife would be shot if the operation failed. Since Czerniaków refused to sign the deportation announcement, it was issued – for the first time in the council's history – under the anonymous heading "Jewish Council" rather than his name.

The deportation order initially exempted all Judenrat members and employees, along with their wives and children. Czerniaków attempted to broaden these exemptions, and Höfle – possibly to ease suspicions – appeared open to concessions. As a result, previously independent institutions were placed under the Judenrat chairman's authority, including the Supply Department, Jewish Social Self-Help (ŻTOS), the Society for the Supply of Products of Jewish Industry, the Cooperative Bank of the Jewish District, the Health Chamber, the Union of Jewish Craftsmen, St. Heymann and Co. Rubbish Removal Enterprise. Their staff thereby gained equivalent protected status.

On 23 July, after learning that orphanage children were to be included in the deportations, Czerniaków committed suicide. During an overnight Judenrat session from 23 to 24 July, former deputy chairman Marek Lichtenbaum was appointed to replace him. Lichtenbaum demonstrated complete compliance with German demands. Abraham Sztolcman and Gustaw Wielikowski were appointed deputy chairmen. On 9 August, following the liquidation of the so-called small ghetto, (Note: It was the part of the ghetto located south of Chłodna Street, enclosed by Żelazna, Sienna, Wielka, Bagno, Rynkowa, Krochmalna, Waliców, and Chłodna streets, as well as Grzybów Square (Engelking & Leociak (2013, pp. 209–210)).) the Judenrat headquarters relocated from 26/28 Grzybowska Street to 19 Ludwik Zamenhof Street, in the former Volhynia Barracks.

From 23 July onward, some Judenrat employees participated in the deportation process. They wore white armbands marked "Judenrat in Warschau – Umsiedlungsaktion" and, alongside Jewish Ghetto Police officers and members of the Jewish Emergency Service (the former Group 13), took part in street "blockades" to round up Jews for transfer to the Umschlagplatz. Certain officials were also assigned to assist on the Umschlagplatz itself.

The promised immunity for Judenrat employees and their families proved short-lived. On 9 August, the Germans ordered the council to halve its workforce and deliver 7,000 individuals from among its employees and their families for deportation to Treblinka by the following noon. Further "blockades" and selections occurred at Judenrat offices on 16, 25, and 27 August, resulting in many staff members being sent to the Umschlagplatz and onward to Treblinka. By the end of Grossaktion Warsaw, only 2,527 of the approximately 9,030 employees recorded in July 1942 remained. On 15 August, meanwhile, the council adopted a streamlined organizational structure with 15 departments.

On the night of 5–6 September, the Judenrat was ordered to post announcements throughout the ghetto, instructing all Jews in the so-called large ghetto to assemble on 6 September in the area bounded by Smocza, Gęsia, Zamenhof, Szczęśliwa streets, as well as Paryski Square. Separate assembly points were designated for different groups, followed by a two-day registration process. German authorities decreed that only 32,000 Jews could remain in the ghetto. Workshop and institution managers received a total of 32,000 "life numbers" (Lebensscheine) to distribute among their workers. All others were slated for deportation to Treblinka. During these events, which went down in ghetto history as the "cauldron on Miła Street", the Judenrat itself was allotted 2,000 "life numbers", of which 500 were assigned to Jewish Ghetto Police officers.

Jewish Ghetto Police officers and their families who did not receive "life numbers" were divided into two groups and, together with their families, confined in designated "police blocks" on Lubecki and Ostrowska streets. Residents of the Lubecki block were soon deported to Treblinka. On 21 September, a blockade was carried out in the Ostrowska Street block. That same day, the final transport of Grossaktion Warsaw departed the Umschlagplatz, carrying 2,196 people, including families of demoted police officers (the officers themselves were deported later to Majdanek concentration camp). On 24 September, SS-Untersturmführer Karl Georg Brandt officially notified the Judenrat that the "resettlement" had concluded.

Following the end of Grossaktion Warsaw, the ghetto effectively ceased to function as a residential area and was transformed into a large forced-labor camp. Both the Judenrat and the Jewish Ghetto Police were stripped of meaningful authority by the Germans and completely lost the trust of the remaining Jewish population. The council's jurisdiction was largely confined to the central ghetto, as individual workshops (shops) operated their own administrations. Many Judenrat departments effectively shut down, and staff were often assigned arbitrary or occasional tasks to justify the council's continued existence. Nonetheless, German authorities sought to maintain an appearance of normality. Toward the end of October or early November 1942, Chairman Marek Lichtenbaum was summoned to a meeting with the SS and Police Leader in the Warsaw District, SS-Oberführer Ferdinand von Sammern-Frankenegg. This was the first instance of a Judenrat chairman meeting such a high-ranking Nazi official. In November 1942, the Judenrat employed approximately 3,000 people; by December, the Jewish Ghetto Police had been reduced to about 240 officers.

From 18 to 21 January 1943, German forces conducted the so-called January action in the ghetto. At least nine Judenrat members were shot or deported to Treblinka during this operation. (Note: These were: Tadeusz Bart, Ber Ajzyk Ekerman, Rachmil Henryk Glucksberg, Józef Jaszuński, Izrael Milejkowski, Bolesław Rozensztadt, Bernard Zundelewicz, Natan Grodzieński, and Zygmunt Hurwicz (Engelking & Leociak (2013, pp. 375–379)).)

From that point onward, the Judenrat's activities effectively ceased. Lichtenbaum acknowledged in discussions with German officials that he no longer held any influence over the ghetto, as real authority had passed to the Jewish Combat Organization. Nonetheless, a few departments continued limited operations until the outbreak of the ghetto uprising. During this period, the council's efforts were almost entirely focused on provisioning matters.

On 19 April 1943, German forces launched the final liquidation of the Warsaw Ghetto, prompting an armed uprising by the Jewish resistance movement. As the operation began, Chairman Lichtenbaum and several councillors – Gustaw Wielikowski, Stanisław Szereszewski and Abraham Sztolcman – were taken hostage and detained at the Befehlstelle at 103 Żelazna Street. Four days later, they were transported to the Umschlagplatz, executed, and their bodies discarded on a rubbish heap. Councillor Abraham Gepner went into hiding with his family during the uprising but was captured in early May 1943 and shot. Councillors Edward Kobryner, Baruch Wolf Rozenthal and Szmuel Winter were also murdered within the ghetto .Szymszon Sztokhamer and Leopold Kupczykier were deported to Majdanek concentration camp. None of the Judenrat members survived the war.

The Judenrat archive was managed by Hillel Seidman. Most of its documents were destroyed during the uprising and suppression. Some surviving materials were later acquired by the Central Jewish Historical Commission, and then the Jewish Historical Institute. Others were incorporated into the Ringelblum Archive or deposited in the State Archive in Warsaw.

== Structure ==
=== Structure until 1942 ===
the Warsaw Judenrat operated through various commissions responsible for specific tasks. These included the Personnel Commission (chaired by Beniamin Zabłudowski), Legal Commission (Bolesław Rozensztadt), Economic Commission (Marek Lichtenbaum), Social Welfare Commission (Łazarz Łabędź), Cemetery Commission (Meszulem Kaminer), Financial Commission (Jakub Berman), Commission for the Labour Battalion (Bernard Zundelewicz), Commission for Hospital Affairs (Izrael Milejkowski), Emigration Commission (Józef Jaszuński), and Audit Commission (Henryk Glücksberg, Hilary Tempel, and Beniamin Zabłudowski).

Over time, these commissions evolved into formal departments, which served as their executive bodies. Each department was overseen by a chairman – usually a Judenrat councillor – with day-to-day management handled by directors. By 1941, nearly 30 departments were in operation. Following a reorganization in May of that year, the structure was streamlined to 26 departments.

The Judenrat's organizational structure was not fixed; it remained fluid throughout its existence. Some departments were dissolved, others renamed or restructured, and new ones created as needs changed. According to historian Maria Ferenc, the following departments functioned until Grossaktion Warsaw in July 1942:

- General Secretariat (26/28 Grzybowska Street) – directors: Szmul Horensztein, Michał Król, Zygmunt Warman
- Department I: General (26/28 Grzybowska Street) – chairman: Marek Lichtenbaum
- Department II: Financial and Budgetary (26/28 Grzybowska Street) – chairman: Jakub Berman (until his death in December 1941), then Stanisław Szereszewski
- Department III: Contributions and Levies (26/28 Grzybowska Street) – chairman: probably Jakub Berman
- Department IV: Cemetery (26/28 Grzybowska Street) – chairman: Meszulem Kaminer (until his death in October 1941), then Zygmunt Hurwicz
- Department V: Legal (27 Grzybowska Street) – chairman: Gustaw Wielikowski
- Department VI: Social Welfare (27 Grzybowska Street) – chairman: Łazarz Kamień (until his death in January 1941), then Meszulam Kaminer (until his death in October 1941), then Gustaw Wielikowski
- Department VII: Economic (26/28 Grzybowska Street) – chairman: Marek Lichtenbaum
- Department VIII: Hospital Affairs (7 Ceglana Street) – chairman: Izrael Milejkowski
- Department IX: Labour (84 Leszno Street) – chairman: Bolesław Rozensztadt, later Chil Rozen
- Department X: Control (26/28 Grzybowska Street) – directed by Majer Brill, later Józef Cukier and engineer Lewitas
- Department XI: Craft Training (from May 1941: Vocational Training Department) – directed by Leon Fajgenbaum; incorporated into the School Department in September 1941
- Department XII: Population Registration (various addresses: 7 Ceglana, 1 Mariańska, 15 Leszno, 9 Kurza, 30 Franciszkańska streets) – chairman: Abraham Sztolcman
- Department XIII: Statistical (84 Leszno Street) – chairman: Józef Jaszuński
- Department XIV: Vital Records – directed by Meir Balaban
- Department XV: Health (58 Leszno Street) – chairman: Izrael Milejkowski
- Department XVI: Hospital Contributions (7 Ceglana Street) – chairman: Edward Kobryner
- Department XVII: Order Service (various addresses: 26/28 Grzybowska Street, later 12 Prosta Street from September 1941 to January 1941, 42 Krochmalna Street from January 1941 to spring 1942, 17 Ogrodowa Street) – chairman: Leopold Kupczykier, from December 1940: Bernard Zundelewicz; director: Józef Szeryński
- Department XVIII: Industrial and Commercial (from February 1942: Industrial Department and Commercial Inspection; 14 Leszno Street) – chairman: Kazimierz Rechthand
- Department XIX: Properties and Public Utilities (27 Grzybowska and 9 Kurza streets) – director: J. Gotlieb, later Leon Perl
- Department XX: Postal (15 Leszno Street, from January 1942: 19 Zamenhof Street) – chairman: Beniamin Zabłudowski (until January 1942), then Natan Grodzieński
- Department XXI: Housing (originally Housing Office; 5 Elektoralna Street, from December 1941: 80 Nowolipie Street) – chairman: Beniamin Zabłudowski, later Tadeusz Bart and Ignacy Baumberg
- Department XXII: Emergency Actions (32 Krochmalna Street) – chairman: Gustaw Wielikowski
- Department XXIII: Collection Office for the Social Insurance Institution (1 Mariańska/34 Pańska streets) – chairman: Aleksander Fogiel
- Department XXIV: Complaints and Reclamation Control (27 Grzybowska Street) – chairman: Bernard Zundelewicz
- Department XXV: Production (various addresses: 18 Nowolipie, 14/16 Prosta, 14 Leszno streets) – chairman: Józef Jaszuński; transformed into the company "Jewish Production" in autumn 1941
- Pharmacy Department (14 Elektoralna Street, later 30 Leszno Street) – chairman: Rachmil Henryk Glücksberg
- Department for Religious Affairs – chairman: Meszulam Kaminer (until October 1941), then Zygmunt Hurwicz
- Prison Department (26 Grzybowska Street) – director: Kaczko; established in summer 1941
- School Department (2 Grzybowska Street) – chairman:; established in September 1941
- Fuel Department (14 Leszno Street) – chairman: Beniamin Zabłudowski, later Chil Rozen
- Department for Culture and Art – director: Edmund Stein; announced in Gazeta Żydowska in December 1941 but never fully operational due to German opposition; a related Performances Section was authorized only in April 1942

Departments typically included permanent sections alongside ad hoc commissions. Overlapping competencies between departments and commissions were frequently observed, and the structure continued to expand. Efforts to rationalize operations and reduce staff – often driven by internal conflicts among interest groups – generally achieved only superficial results.

In the second half of 1940, amongto expedite urgent matters, Chairman Adam Czerniaków established a personal secretariat headed by his trusted aide, Leon Tenenbaum-Tyszka.

=== Structure after Grossaktion Warsaw ===
On 15 August 1942, during Grossaktion Warsaw, the Judenrat adopted a simplified organizational structure, retaining only 15 departments. A further streamlining occurred at the end of 1942, with additional departments dissolved. After the establishment of the residual ghetto (the greatly reduced area where survivors were confined), the Judenrat's authority was limited exclusively to the central ghetto. Following the January action in 1943, only a few departments continued to operate. The last functioning department was reportedly the Supply Department.

According to historian Maria Ferenc, the departments active in the ghetto after Grossaktion Warsaw included:

- Department I: Presidential (19 Zamenhof Street) – chairman: Marek Lichtenbaum
- Department II: General (19 Zamenhof Street) – chairman: Józef Jaszuński
- Department III: Financial and Budgetary (19 Zamenhof Street) – chairman: Stanisław Szereszewski
- Department IV: Administrative (17 Gęsia Street) – chairman: Bolesław Rozensztadt
- Department V: Public Health (10 Pawia Street) – chairman: Izrael Milejkowski
- Department VI: Benefits and Social Welfare (19 Zamenhof Street) – chairman: Gustaw Wielikowski
- Department VII: Economic (19 Zamenhof Street) – chairman: Abraham Sztolcman
- Department VIII: Artisan Services (29 Gęsia Street) – chairman: Abraham Wolfowicz
- Department IX: Labour (84 Leszno Street) – chairman: Chil Rozen
- Department X: Supply (19 Zamenhof Street) – chairman: Abraham Gepner
- Department XI: Postal (19 Zamenhof Street) – chairman: Natan Grodzieński
- Department XII: Properties (17/3–4 Gęsia Street) – chairman: Bolesław Rozensztadt
- Department XIII: Order Service (17 Ogrodowa Street) – chairman: Bernard Zundelewicz (temporarily Henryk Glucksberg)
- Department XIV: Cemetery (19 Zamenhof Street) – chairman: Zygmunt Hurwicz

=== Agencies of the Judenrat ===
The Judenrat also exercised supervisory functions over several partially autonomous agencies. These included:

- Supply Institution (5 Tłomackie Street, later 12 Leszno Street) – established in December 1940; chairman: Abraham Gepner
- Economic Council (14 Leszno Street) – established in July 1941; chairman: Abraham Gepner
- Cooperative of Jewish Council Employees (36 Pańska Street)
- Cooperative Bank of the Jewish District (originally Banking Clearing Office; 10 Nowolipki Street) – launched in February 1942; chairman: Edward Kobryner
- Community Outpatient Clinic (6 Twarda Street) – chief physician: Dr. Zygmunt Fajncyn
- Central Delivery Office – launched in July 1941
- Tram Ticket Sales Office (15 Leszno Street)
- Jewish Ghetto Police

From July 1942, the Judenrat was also officially responsible for supervising the Central Commission for the Promotion of Work in the Shops, which managed self-help initiatives and food distribution for workers in the workshops.

=== Jewish Ghetto Police ===
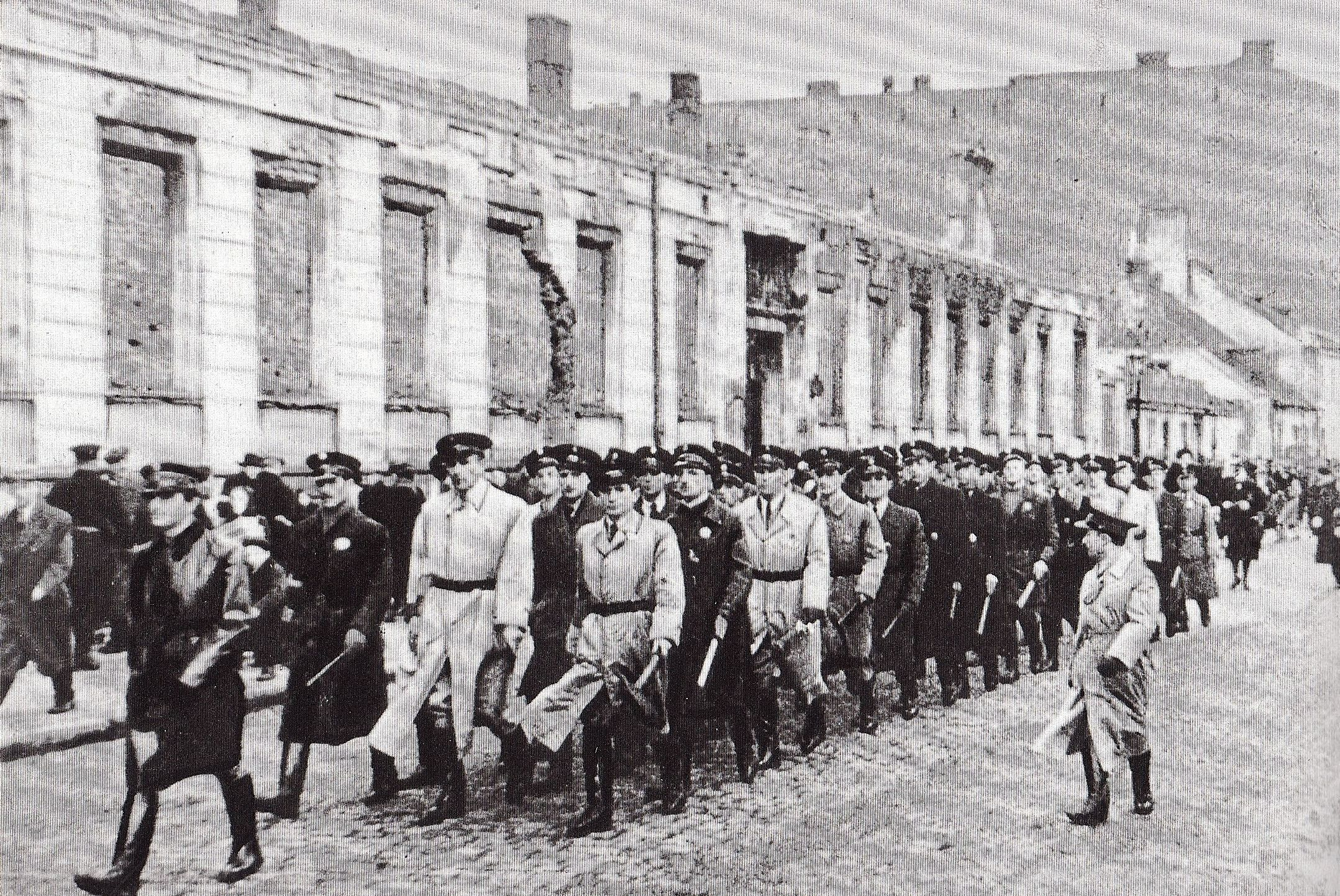
Officers of the Jewish Ghetto Police

Adam Czerniaków received the official order to organize the Jewish Ghetto Police on 12 October 1940, although rumors of its impending establishment had circulated in Warsaw since spring of that year. On 26 October, Józef Andrzej Szeryński command of the Jewish Ghetto Police. According to Tadeusz Wittelson's recollections, the selection occurred during a meeting at councillor Leopold Kupczykier's apartment, attended by Kupczykier, Czerniaków, Edward Kobryner and Szeryński himself. Some accounts suggest that Szeryński was recommended to Czerniaków by either Leon Berenson or Stefan Lubliner.

The statute of the Jewish Ghetto Police was approved on 29 November 1940. The service was formed on the basis of the existing guard unit of the Judenrat's Labour Battalion, had previously been responsible for apprehending Jews evading forced labour, protecting the Jewish cemetery, and securing Judenrat buildings.

The Jewish Ghetto Police fell nominally under Department XVII (Order Service) of the Judenrat. Leopold Kupczykier initially chaired the department, later replaced by Bernard Zundelewicz. In practice, however, the department chairman's role was marginal, and Czerniaków himself exerted relatively little influence over the Jewish Ghetto Police's operations. Day-to-day direction was handled by Commander Szeryński, with Marian Händel serving as his deputy. Jewish Ghetto Police personnel also staffed the Central Arrest facility, which was overseen by the Judenrat's Prison Department. Overall supervision of the Jewish Ghetto Police was exercised by the Blue Police of the General Government, under commander Aleksander Reszczyński. Operationally, it reported to the Warsaw-North Command (led by Mieczysław Tarwid) and local precincts. The Jewish Ghetto Police was further subordinate to German civilian authorities (the Commissioner for the Jewish Residential District) and police organs, including the Warsaw Gestapo.

Admission requirements for the Jewish Ghetto Police included: age 21–40, completion of at least six years of secondary education, good health, minimum height of 170 cm, minimum weight of 60 kg, completed military service, clean criminal record, and recommendations from two reputable district residents. Recruitment concluded in autumn 1940; by mid-November, the force numbered 1,635 officers. An additional intake in January 1941 raised the total to approximately 2,000. Further expansions occurred in summer 1941 with the creation of the Anti-Epidemic Company and the dissolution of Group 13. The structure of the Jewish Ghetto Police was repeatedly and artificially enlarged to provide employment to as many individuals as possible, with positions often secured through personal connections or payments.

The officer ranks in the Jewish Ghetto Police were: commander, deputy commander, district commander, and sub-district commander. Lower-ranking officers were divided into group leaders, section leaders, and orderlies. Jewish Ghetto Police members wore no uniforms; their only distinguishing features were a cap and an armband. Caps were navy blue with a light-blue band (those with higher education added a white-and-blue cord around the band) and bore the Jewish Ghetto Police emblem. Armbands were yellow, inscribed "Jewish Council in Warsaw – Ghetto Police" in Polish and German, together with the service number. Lower ranks were indicated by silver galloon around the cap band and yellow studs hammered into a black rectangle on the armband. Officer ranks were denoted by silver stars affixed to a plush or velvet backing encircled by silver galloon. Over time, physicians associated with the Jewish Ghetto Police were permitted to wear the service cap with the Rod of Asclepius. Certain Judenrat officials were also occasionally allowed to wear the Jewish Ghetto Police cap; among those who did so was Mieczysław Maślanko, chairman of the Disciplinary Court.

Within the ghetto, Jewish Ghetto Police officers performed solely order-maintenance duties. They staffed posts at the ghetto gates and guarded the walls from the Jewish side. Jewish policemen were also detailed as guards to labor camps. The Judenrat additionally assigned the Jewish Ghetto Police responsibility for supervising street trading, though enforcing the relevant regulations proved impossible in practice.

Jewish Ghetto Police officers were widely regarded as corrupt, demoralized, and brutal. Theft, extortion, vandalism, and violence on their part were commonplace. Emanuel Ringelblum's notes and the underground press reported instances of fatal beatings, including a young boy allegedly beaten to death in the Judenrat building for kicking an officer, a Dr. Zusman, and an elderly man who died of a heart attack after being assaulted on the street by a Jewish Ghetto Police officer. Brief accounts of such violence also appeared in the German-controlled Gazeta Żydowska. In October 1941, several Jewish Ghetto Police officers reportedly assaulted Mojżesz Fogl, head of the Judenrat's Housing Office.

Plans to establish a fire brigade in the ghetto, intended to operate as an agency of the Jewish Ghetto Police, were developed from early 1942. Organization of the unit, known as the Fire Emergency Service, began in June 1942 under the command of Jakub Brendl, a Jewish Ghetto Police officer and former volunteer firefighter from Kalisz. However, the brigade never became operational.

In early May 1942, Szeryński was arrested by the Germans on charges of smuggling his wife's furs to the "Aryan side". He was temporarily replaced by his deputy, Jakub Lejkin. On 2 July 1942, during the execution in Babice, 10 Jewish Ghetto Police officers who were allegedly involved in smuggling were shot.

During the initial days of Grossaktion Warsaw, Szeryński was reinstated as Jewish Ghetto Police commander. His influence nevertheless diminished significantly in favor of Lejkin and Mieczysław Szmerling, the latter serving as director of the Umschlagplatz. Following Czerniaków's suicide, these two effectively exercised Jewish authority in the ghetto. On the orders of Hauptsturmführer Hermann Worthoff, Gestapo informant Józef Ehrlich was appointed deputy director of the Jewish Ghetto Police. Throughout the deportation operation, all Jewish Ghetto Police officers except administrative staff were assigned to cordon duty at the Umschlagplatz and to escorting Jews there. The officers frequently became targets of attacks during building blockades and while marching groups to the assembly square. On 20 August 1942, Izrael Kanal – a former Jewish policeman – carried out an unsuccessful assassination attempt on Szeryński.

On 29 October 1942, Jewish Combat Organization member Eliasz Różański shot Jakub Lejkin on Gęsia Street.

During the January action of 1943, Jewish policemen did not participate directly in the deportations. On 23 January 1943, Józef Szeryński committed suicide; he was succeeded by Leon Piżyc. After the outbreak of the Warsaw Ghetto Uprising in April 1943, several dozen remaining Jewish Ghetto Police officers, including Piżyc, were executed near Pawiak prison.

== Members of the Judenrat ==
=== Chairmen ===
==== Adam Czerniaków ====
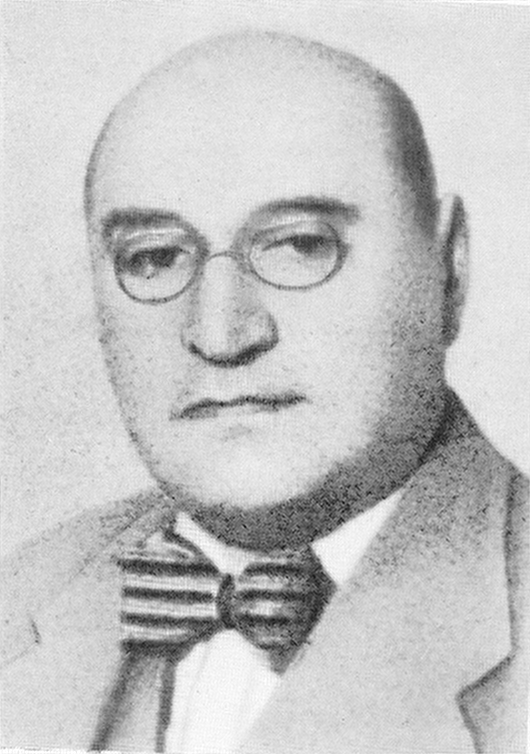
Adam Czerniaków

Adam Czerniaków was appointed the first chairman of the Warsaw Judenrat by German authorities. An engineer by profession, he was also an educator, educational activist, publicist, and one of the founders and leaders of the Jewish artisanal movement in Poland. In the interwar period, Czerniaków engaged in politics. From 1927 to 1934, he served on the Warsaw City Council. In 1930, he won a Senate seat in by-elections but was unable to take it due to the dissolution of parliament. In 1937, the Sanation regime appointed him to the provisional commissary board of the Jewish Religious Community in Warsaw. During the defence of Warsaw in September 1939, the Civilian Commissioner at the Warsaw Defence Command Stefan Starzyński named him commissary president of the community.

Czerniaków consistently maintained an apolitical stance, avoiding formal party or ideological affiliations. He had only a passive command of Yiddish, the language spoken by most Polish Jews, which limited his prominence in pre-war Jewish political and social life. Israel Gutman, followed by some later scholars, described him as somewhat detached from the broader Jewish masses.

As chairman of the Judenrat, Czerniaków pursued a pragmatic and conciliatory policy toward the German authorities. He believed that compliance and negotiation offered the best chance of enabling as many ghetto inhabitants as possible to survive until the war's end. He generally avoided open confrontation, favoring persuasion, carefully worded arguments, and – where feasible – delaying the implementation of the most harmful orders. When necessary, he paid contributions, bribes, or gifts to German officials. His goal was to preserve the ghetto in as stable a form as possible, minimizing German interference in its internal affairs. For this reason, he resisted efforts by certain German functionaries to "productivize" Warsaw's Jews and transform the ghetto – along the lines of the Łódź Ghetto – into a vast forced-labor camp. Interactions with German authorities frequently subjected him to harassment, humiliation, and even physical assaults.

Czerniaków harbored no ambition for dictatorial control over the Judenrat. He initially sought to involve councillors in governance and to reach decisions collegially. Over time, however, the council's role as a collective body diminished. This stemmed partly from changes in its composition: original members were gradually replaced by individuals who were either disinterested in day-to-day responsibilities or primarily motivated by personal gain. In response, Czerniaków increasingly treated the council as a largely representative body that lent legitimacy to his decisions. Important matters were instead handled by small, ad hoc groups and commissions, typically comprising his most trusted associates. Despite occasional accusations of despotism, Czerniaków never wielded absolute authority; councillors could, at times, override his preferences and secure decisions he opposed.

==== Marek Lichtenbaum ====
Following Adam Czerniaków's suicide, German authorities appointed Marek Lichtenbaum – Czerniaków's former deputy – as chairman of the Judenrat. A civil engineer by profession, Lichtenbaum had been active in the Warsaw Jewish community before the war. From 1937, he served on the commissary board of the Jewish Religious Community in Warsaw.

Lichtenbaum enjoyed a poor reputation in the ghetto. Contemporaries described him as a "pathetic creature, a troublemaker, and a boor". He faced accusations of personally enriching himself at the Judenrat's expense. At the same time, he was acknowledged as an effective organizer – a quality Czerniaków himself had valued.

Lichtenbaum's tenure coincided with the final phase of the ghetto's existence, the period of the so-called residual ghetto, which functioned essentially as a large forced-labor camp. His role was largely ceremonial; after the January action of 1943, he exerted no real influence over events in the ghetto.

=== Councillors ===
The Judenrat consisted of 24 councillors selected by the chairman. Some were drawn from the board of the pre-war Jewish Religious Community in Warsaw, while others represented various political tendencies. However, the council's composition was not broadly representative of Warsaw's Jewish population; it primarily comprised members of the Jewish elite.

The initial members of the Judenrat were:

- Tadeusz Bart
- Jakub Berman
- Adam Czerniaków (chairman, 1939–1942)
- Ber Ajzyk Ekerman
- Abraham Gepner
- Henryk Glücksberg
- Józef Jaszuński
- Meszulem Kaminer
- Edward Kobryner
- Marek Lichtenbaum (deputy chairman, 1939–1942; chairman from July 1942)
- Łazarz Łabędź
- Izrael Milejkowski
- Chil Rozen
- Bolesław Rozensztadt
- Baruch Wolf Rozenthal
- Herman Schwartz
- Stanisław Szereszewski
- Dawid Szpiro
- Szymszon Sztokhamer
- Abraham Sztolcman
- Hilary Tempel
- Beniamin Zabłudowski
- Bernard Zundelewicz

Józef Kermisz and Marcin Urynowicz note that, at the very outset, the council also included Abraham Weiss, Meir Balaban, Szmul Zygielbojm, and Chaim Szoszkies. According to Urynowicz, the original composition further comprised Apolinary Hartglas, Mojżesz Indelman, Mojżesz Koerner, Yitzhak-Meir Levin, and R. Szafar. Many of these early members soon left Warsaw, were arrested, or were removed from the council.

Later additions to the Judenrat included:

- Jerzy Graff
- Henryk Grasberg
- Natan Grodzieński
- Zygmunt Hurwicz
- Leopold Kupczykier
- Gustaw Wielikowski (deputy chairman from 1942)
- Szmuel Winter
- Abraham Wolfowicz

Like other Jews in the ghetto, Judenrat members were required to wear an armband bearing the Star of David. For protection against roundups and assaults by ordinary German personnel, councillors wore an additional broad, dark-blue armband. Higher Judenrat officials also received supplementary dark-blue armbands, though narrower. The privilege of wearing such distinguishing armbands was extended to employees of certain Judenrat agencies, including Jewish Ghetto Police officers, physicians, and staff of vocational schools.

== Criticism and opposition in the ghetto ==
=== Accusations of corruption, nepotism and incompetence ===
The Judenrat was established on the basis of the pre-war Jewish community. Whereas the community had focused primarily on religious and charitable activities, the Judenrat was forced to oversee virtually every aspect of Jewish life in Warsaw and, later, in the enclosed Warsaw Ghetto. Despite considerable efforts, it proved impossible to turn the Judenrat into an efficient administrative body. Many individuals lacking administrative experience joined its ranks, often motivated mainly by the need for income and the protection a position offered against German repression. While Chairman Adam Czerniaków was widely recognized for his personal integrity, corruption became rampant at lower levels of the hierarchy. Officials were frequently perceived as incompetent and arrogant. In many cases, experienced pre-war public servants refused to cooperate with the council. Positions were commonly believed to be obtainable only through patronage or bribes. The situation was worsened by chronic shortages of funds and essential supplies, combined with the rigid constraints imposed by the German occupiers. These factors prevented the Judenrat from meaningfully alleviating the suffering of Warsaw's Jews.

As a result, resentment – and often outright hatred – toward the Judenrat was nearly universal among ghetto inhabitants. German authorities noted with satisfaction that Jewish frustration was directed primarily at the council rather than at themselves. Criticism of corruption, nepotism, and administrative disorder appeared, among other places, in the collaborationist Gazeta Żydowska. Judenrat officials frequently served as negative figures in ghetto satires and cabaret performances, including the popular Żywy dziennik, which was performed at Sztuka Café. Offices of the Judenrat were repeatedly scenes of scuffles, disturbances, and protests involving forced laborers and their families, unpaid employees, relatives of German-held hostages, refugees, deportees, and impoverished residents seeking aid.

Memoirs of ghetto inhabitants repeatedly highlight widespread corruption within the Judenrat, corroborated by surviving council documents. In 1941, for instance, investigations revealed that after Jewish property was confiscated and placed under Judenrat administration, officials in commissary managements secured positions and benefits for relatives or protégés – one reported case involved five properties assigned to members of Meszulem Kaminer's family. The Labour Battalion was notorious for corruption, to the extent that even German officials intervened. It was rivaled in this regard by the Housing Department and the Jewish Ghetto Police. As one ghetto chronicler observed, "there was scarcely a department in the Judenrat to which a lengthy list of accusations could not be attached".

In January 1942, the so-called "cemetery affair" (also known as the "dentists' affair") erupted in the ghetto. The underground Bund newspaper Der Weker reported that gravediggers at the Jewish cemetery, in collusion with Jewish Order Service officers, had been opening fresh graves since autumn 1941 to extract gold teeth from corpses. This practice was said to have lasted since autumn 1941. The perpetrators were arrested but showed no remorse. According to the memoirs of Stanisław Adler's memoirs, the Judenrat suppressed the scandal, fearing that turning the culprits over to German authorities would result in reprisals against Jewish gravediggers and other cemetery and funeral workers.

Ghetto residents were further outraged by the Judenrat-organized "saunas" – mandatory building disinfections triggered by any reported typhoid case. These operations forced residents to remain outdoors for extended periods, often in harsh weather, while their apartments were disinfected. The process was frequently accompanied by vandalism and theft. One particularly notorious incident occurred in August 1941 on Krochmalna Street, where over 18,000 residents were evicted and left outside for 24 hours. Many lost or had their clothing destroyed during compulsory bathing, and upon returning found their homes ransacked or looted. Wealthier residents could reportedly secure exemptions for their apartments by paying fees. Underground sources claimed that "saunas" were sometimes used punitively; for instance, on 31 January 1942, a disinfection at 39 Dzielna Street allegedly displaced 3,000 residents into freezing conditions because the building owed the Judenrat 800 PLN. Officials reportedly extorted 2,000 PLN from the residents afterward. On instructions from the Judenrat's Health Department, the Jewish Ghetto Police also conducted "collection blockades" to extract payment for these disinfections.

The Judenrat's role in supplying contingents of Jewish forced laborers drew sharp criticism for favoritism and inequality. Critics, including Emanuel Ringelblum, highlighted exemptions granted to those with official employment and the practice of allowing wealthier individuals to buy substitutes. Henryk Makower noted that this resulted in few members of the intelligentsia being sent to labor camps. After workers were dispatched, the Judenrat faced accusations of abandoning them entirely, offering no support or concern for their welfare. Some sources, however, indicate that collections of clothing, food, and medicine were organized for camp prisoners, though the aid was reportedly refused by the recipients. Judenrat officials who participated in camp inspections encountered intense hostility. According to Leopold Kupczykier, during one visit he was surrounded by prisoners shouting insults and singing derogatory songs aimed at the council. Another official, Goldfeil, was reportedly assaulted multiple times by enraged workers.

The Judenrat also faced criticism for mismanagement. Public opinion often blamed the Supply Institution for the chronic food shortages, accusing its staff of incompetence and corruption. In reality, however, the institution's options were severely constrained: it was restricted to suppliers approved by the Transferstelle and obliged to accept the prices dictated by them. The Judenrat was further accused of insufficient efforts to combat informing and extortion in the ghetto. During Grossaktion Warsaw, its members were charged with manipulating deportation lists to protect relatives and friends. Emanuel Ringelblum noted that this practice contributed to the deaths of many social activists, artists, and members of the intelligentsia.

Accusations of corruption and abuse were directed at individual councillors and senior officials. Councillor Beniamin Zabłudowski was widely regarded in the ghetto as particularly corrupt, reputedly due to his ties to the criminal underworld; rumors even claimed he died from excessive alcohol consumption. Another councillor, Henryk Czerwiński, was alleged to have operated a casino at 16 Chłodna Street. Nevertheless, Judenrat members and employees did not form a homogeneous group. Chairman Adam Czerniaków was generally seen as personally honest; Mordechai Tenenbaum described him as one of only three "truly honest" Judenrat chairmen in occupied Poland.

Several councillors enjoyed positive reputations, including Abraham Gepner, Szmuel Winter, Stanisław Szereszewski, and Meszulem Kaminer. Competent and idealistic individuals existed among lower-ranking officials as well. Barbara Engelking highlights Nachum Remba, who founded the first trade union within the Judenrat, led efforts to combat abuses, and – during Grossaktion Warsaw – selflessly worked to rescue Jews from the Umschlagplatz. Stories also circulated of Jewish policemen who behaved honorably during the deportations. Among those mentioned were officer Kapłański, reportedly executed by the Germans for helping people escape the Umschlagplatz, and eight policemen who allegedly took their own lives in the first week of the action.

=== Criticism of Czerniaków ===
Despite his acknowledged personal integrity, Adam Czerniaków faced accusations of authoritarianism and a thirst for power. Many ghetto inhabitants simultaneously overestimated his actual influence and capabilities. Emanuel Ringelblum's notes describe Czerniaków's directives as non-negotiable, with his every word treated as an order. Rumors circulated that Czerniaków and other Judenrat members enjoyed significantly better living conditions than ordinary residents – though in reality these differed little from those of other intelligentsia families in the ghetto. Criticism also targeted his alleged delusions of grandeur and preference for formal ceremonies. The underground press highlighted, often with irony, the celebrations for his 60th birthday, claiming he received bouquets costing several thousand PLN from the Judenrat budget. His speeches were frequently quoted in clandestine publications, accompanied by mocking commentary.

A particular point of contention was Czerniaków's retention of a private car – a privilege that irritated even some Germans and was seen as emblematic of Judenrat extravagance. In practice, the vehicle was shared among council members and officials, primarily for transporting essential materials within and outside the ghetto.

Czerniaków did indeed favor ceremony and public displays of respect. However, as Barbara Engelking assesses, he "neither suffered from delusions of grandeur nor craved power". He was aware of the criticism but justified formal events as necessary for boosting morale, likening himself to the captain of the sinking RMS Titanic who ordered the orchestra to play until the end.

Czerniaków was further accused of favoring assimilated Jews and converts within the Judenrat. A frequent example cited was his appointment of Józef Szeryński – a convert rumored to harbor antisemitic views – as commander of the Jewish Ghetto Police. He was also charged with being unduly influenced by informants in his circle. It is documented that several close associates had poor reputations (e.g., Beniamin Zabłudowski) or were known or suspected collaborators (Izrael First, Marian Händel, Jerzy Furstenberg). Czerniaków knew of these issues but prioritized personal loyalty and professional competence. (Note: In his diary Adam Czerniaków quoted words from one of the characters in Stefan Żeromski's novel Popioły (Ashes): "Do I not also have under my command ruffians, cutthroats, murderers, yet I spare and value them, for they are the ones who best know how [...]. It is precisely these who will best lead you out of misfortune if you are surrounded" (Fuks (1983, p. 239)).) He adopted a pragmatic approach to confirmed or suspected collaborators, employing them as intermediaries with German authorities.

=== Conflicts with social welfare organizations ===
The Judenrat maintained a sharp conflict with the Coordinating Commission and, later, with Jewish Social Self-Help over authority in social welfare activities within the ghetto. Social activists viewed the Judenrat – an institution imposed by German decree – with deep distrust and hostility. The two organizations competed fiercely for scarce financial resources allocated to aid efforts. Ideological divisions further impeded cooperation: many activists, often aligned with left-wing movements, saw the Judenrat as dominated by "representatives of merchants' associations" and accused it of seeking monopoly control over welfare, molding it in the image of pre-war charitable philanthropy. Tensions on these grounds peaked in 1941.

According to Michał Weichert, the Judenrat obstructed attempts to secure loans for the Jewish Social Self-Help despite prior German approval. Similar friction arose with the Jewish Social Welfare Society, as the Judenrat sought to subordinate its departments and functions. In 1941, for instance, the council assumed control of Jewish Social Welfare Society's Public Kitchens Department and Section for Care of Refugees and Fire Victims. Judenrat members also opposed the independence of house committees, attempting to bring them under council authority – a move that sparked repeated clashes with committee activists. Councillor Chil Rozen was openly critical of the Judenrat in interviews recorded by the Oneg Shabbat archive. He argued that even with sufficient resources, poverty and mass mortality could not be eradicated in the ghetto, as the ruling class within it remained incapable of adapting its mindset to the catastrophic new realities.

Particularly vehement criticism from activists linked to the Jewish Social Welfare Society and Oneg Shabbat focused on the Judenrat's tax policy. The council introduced a poll tax independent of income, deeming it the simplest to administer. Social activists condemned this as regressive, disproportionately burdening the poorest while favoring the wealthy. Indirect taxes compounded the hardship for the impoverished, including the tax on bread ration stamps implemented in June 1940. Ruta Sakowska calculated that as much as 69% of Judenrat welfare expenditures were funded by levies on the poorer population (primarily indirect taxes and house committee contributions), while the wealthiest residents contributed only 16.6%. In early 1942, Czerniaków sought to make the tax system more progressive but met resistance from both German authorities and the Judenrat's own Economic Council. Until the ghetto's liquidation, residents faced more than 40 different taxes (Israel Gutman cited a figure of 48).

The shops organized under Judenrat auspices also drew sharp criticism. Tatiana Brustin-Berenstein accused council members of colluding with the Jewish economic elite to exploit workers in these facilities. The Jewish underground press similarly highlighted poor working conditions, low wages, exploitative practices, and rigid discipline in the shops.

Many social activists argued that the Judenrat, as a Jewish institution, should demonstrate loyalty to Jewish culture. Yiddishists, such as Aron Einhorn, initially expressed hope that the ghetto's creation might spark a "renaissance of the Yiddish language". For these reasons, activists criticized the predominance of Polish in Judenrat offices and the prominence of assimilated Jews and converts in its ranks. Emanuel Ringelblum described the council as a "nest of repulsive assimilation", while Hillel Zeitlin called it dominated by "concealed, masked assimilators who feel aversion toward the Jewish language, Jewish culture, and the Jewish masses". Despite such criticism, Czerniaków refused to make Yiddish the official language of the Judenrat. He did, however, mandate that regulations be issued in both Polish and Yiddish. Signs reading "Here we speak Yiddish" were posted in council offices, though few officials actually used the language. Plans for Yiddish-language courses for staff were announced, but Katarzyna Person notes there is no evidence they ever occurred. Activists also condemned the elementary school curriculum developed by the Judenrat's School Commission, accusing it of pursuing a "Polonizing" agenda.

Czerniaków was acutely aware of the Judenrat's dismal reputation. In early 1941, he invited Ignacy Schiper and Szachno Sagan – representing the "Team of Representatives of Political Parties" – to join a commission aimed at addressing the council's problems. Both men resigned from Judenrat activities in June of that year. Sagan subsequently declared that social activists "do not wish to bear responsibility for the actions of the Community over which they have no influence". In spring 1941, Czerniaków also sought assistance from the respected lawyer Leon Berenson to help reform the situation. Cooperation never materialized, however, due to Berenson's serious illness and subsequent death.

=== Relations with the Jewish resistance movement ===
Underground organizations in the Warsaw Ghetto issued harshly negative assessments of the Judenrat, branding it a collaborationist institution and viewing service in its ranks as an act of betrayal against the Jewish people. Judenrat officials and Jewish Ghetto officers were among the primary targets of political condemnation and physical attacks by resistance members. According to Adam Czerniaków, Gestapo informants exerted considerable influence over the Judenrat's daily operations from its earliest months. This reportedly contributed to his own brief imprisonment in Pawiak in November 1940, allegedly orchestrated by a disgruntled informant denied an apartment.

At least two senior Judenrat officials who openly acted as liaisons with German authorities – Alfred Nossig and Izrael First – were assassinated by the Jewish underground. Other victims of such actions included Mieczysław Brzeziński (supervisor of loaders at the Umschlagplatz) and Jerzy Furstenberg (adjutant to Marian Händel). In the residual ghetto and workshops, attacks continued against both former and serving Jewish Ghetto Police officers.

According to Yitzhak Zuckerman, in 1943 councillor Abraham Sztolcman contacted the Home Army in an attempt to convince its leadership to sever ties with the Jewish Combat Organization, which he depicted as a terrorist group lacking genuine support in the ghetto. The Polish underground rejected his overtures. Informed of the affair by Henryk Woliński, Jewish Combat Organization issued a death sentence against Sztolcman, though it could not be carried out before the Warsaw Ghetto Uprising.

Despite the prevailing hostility, some Judenrat members provided financial assistance to the resistance. Abraham Gepner, for instance, channeled funds to the Jewish Combat Organization.

== Bibliography ==
- Adamska, J.; Kaźmierska, J.; Sakowska, R., eds. (1988). Tak było... : sprawozdania z warszawskiego getta 1939-1943 [This Is How It Was... : Reports from the Warsaw Ghetto 1939-1943] (in Polish). Warsaw: Council for the Protection of Struggle and Martyrdom Sites.
- Bethke, S. (2021). Dance on the Razors Edge: Crime and Punishment in the Nazi Ghettos. Toronto; Buffalo; London: University of Toronto Press. ISBN 978-1-4875-3116-4.
- Engelking, Barbara; Leociak, Jacek (2013). Getto warszawskie. Przewodnik po nieistniejącym mieście [Warsaw Ghetto. Guide to a Non-existent City] (in Polish). Warsaw: Stowarzyszenie Centrum Badań nad Zagładą Żydów. ISBN 978-83-63444-28-0.
- Fuks, Marian, ed. (1983). Adama Czerniakowa dziennik getta warszawskiego. 6 IX 1939 – 23 VII 1942 [Adam Czerniaków's Diary of the Warsaw Ghetto. 6 September 1939 – 23 July 1942] (in Polish). Warsaw: Państwowe Wydawnictwo Naukowe. ISBN 83-01-03042-9.
- Grochowski, Michał (2020). "Szopy w getcie warszawskim – próba analizy zjawiska" [Workshops in the Warsaw Ghetto – An Attempt at Analysis of the Phenomenon]. Kwartalnik Historii Żydów (in Polish). 3 (275). ISSN 1899-3044.
- Gutman, Israel (1976). "Adam Czerniakow – The Man and his Diary". In Gutman, Israel; Rothkirchen, Livia (eds.). The Catastrophe of European Jewry. Antecedents – History – Reflections. Jerusalem: Yad Vashem.
- Gutman, Israel (1993). Żydzi warszawscy 1939–1943. Getto, podziemie, walka [Warsaw Jews 1939–1943. Ghetto, Underground, Struggle] (in Polish). Warsaw: Rytm. ISBN 83-85249-26-5.
- Janczewska, M. (2007). "Obozy pracy przymusowej dla Żydów na terenie dystryktu warszawskiego" [Forced Labor Camps for Jews in the Warsaw District]. In Engelking, B.; Leociak, J.; Libionka, D. (eds.). Prowincja Noc. Życie i zagłada Żydów w dystrykcie warszawskim [Province Night. Life and Extermination of Jews in the Warsaw District] (in Polish). Warsaw: Centrum Badań nad Zagładą Żydów. ISBN 9788373881426.
- Janczewska, Marta (2014). "Warszawska Rada Żydowska w świetle dokumentów urzędowych z Archiwum Ringelbluma" [The Warsaw Jewish Council in Light of Official Documents from the Ringelblum Archive]. Zagłada Żydów. Studia i Materiały (in Polish) (10): 131–167. doi:10.32927/ZZSiM.519. ISSN 2657-3571.
- Janczewska, M., ed. (2014). Archiwum Ringelbluma. Konspiracyjne Archiwum Getta Warszawy. Rada Żydowska w Warszawie (1939-1943) [The Ringelblum Archive. Underground Archive of the Warsaw Ghetto. Jewish Council in Warsaw (1939-1943)] (in Polish). Vol. 12. Warsaw: Wydawnictwa Uniwersytetu Warszawskiego. ISBN 978-83-235-1440-4.
- Kassow, S. D. (2010). Kto napisze naszą historię? Ukryte archiwum Emanuela Ringelbluma [Who Will Write Our History? Emanuel Ringelblum's Hidden Archive] (in Polish). Warsaw: Amber. ISBN 978-83-241-3633-9.
- Kermisz, Yosef (1989). "The Judenrat in Warsaw". The Nazi Holocaust. Part 6: The Victims of the Holocaust. Vol. 1. De Gruyter Saur. pp. 216–231. doi:10.1515/9783110968736.216. ISBN 978-3-598-21559-9.
- Libionka, Dariusz (2017). Zagłada Żydów w Generalnym Gubernatorstwie. Zarys problematyki [The Extermination of Jews in the General Government. Overview of the Issue] (in Polish). Lublin: Państwowe Muzeum na Majdanku. ISBN 978-83-62816-34-7.
- Majewska, J. (2015). ""Czym wytłumaczy Pan…?" Inteligencja żydowska o polonizacji i asymilacji Żydów w getcie warszawskim" ["How Will You Explain...?" Jewish Intelligentsia on Polonization and Assimilation of Jews in the Warsaw Ghetto]. Zagłada Żydów. Studia i Materiały (in Polish) (11). doi:10.32927/ZZSiM.475. ISSN 2657-3571.
- Mazor, M. (1993). The Vanished City: Everyday Life in the Warsaw Ghetto. Translated by Jacobson, J. New York: Marsilio Publishers. ISBN 978-0-941419-93-2.
- Michman, D. (2007). "O okolicznościach ustanowienia warszawskiego Judenratu. Nowy punkt widzenia" [On the Circumstances of the Establishment of the Warsaw Judenrat. A New Point of View]. Kwartalnik Historii Żydów (in Polish). 1 (221).
- Patt, A. (2014). "Jewish Resistance in the Warsaw Ghetto". In Henry, P. (ed.). Jewish Resistance Against the Nazis. Catholic University of America Press. doi:10.2307/j.ctt7zswcf.21. ISBN 978-0-8132-2590-6.
- Person, Katarzyna (2014). Assimilated Jews in the Warsaw Ghetto, 1940-1943. Syracuse, New York: Syracuse University Press. ISBN 978-0-8156-3334-1.
- Person, Katarzyna (2018). Policjanci. Wizerunek Żydowskiej Służby Porządkowej w getcie warszawskim [Policemen. Image of the Jewish Ghetto Police in the Warsaw Ghetto] (in Polish). Warsaw: Żydowski Instytut Historyczny im. Emanuela Ringelbluma. ISBN 978-83-65254-78-8.
- Person, Katarzyna (2021). Warsaw Ghetto Police: The Jewish Order Service during the Nazi Occupation. Translated by Nowak-Soliński, Z. Cornell University Press. ISBN 978-1-5017-5408-1. JSTOR 10.7591/j.ctv10vm0ks.
- Roland, C. (1992). Courage Under Siege: Starvation, Disease, and Death in the Warsaw Ghetto. New York; Oxford: Oxford University Press. ISBN 978-0195062854.
- Sinnreich, H. J. (2023). The Atrocity of Hunger. Starvation in the Warsaw, Lodz and, Krakow Ghettos during World War II. Cambridge University Press. ISBN 9781009105293.
- Stone, L.; Lehnstaedt, S. (2023). "Defeating Typhus in the Warsaw Ghetto: A Scientific Look at Historical Sources". In Kopstein, J. S.; Subotić, J.; Welch, S. (eds.). Politics, Violence, Memory. The New Social Science of the Holocaust. Cornell University Press. doi:10.1515/9781501766763-010. ISBN 978-1-5017-6676-3.
- Urynowicz, Marcin (2009). Adam Czerniaków 1880–1942. Prezes Getta Warszawskiego [Adam Czerniaków 1880–1942. Chairman of the Warsaw Ghetto] (in Polish). Wołowiec: Instytut Pamięci Narodowej. ISBN 978-83-7629-050-8.
