= Centnerszwer =

Centnerszwer is a Polish surname. Notable people with the surname include:

- Jakub Centnerszwer (1798–1880), Polish mathematician
- Mieczysław Centnerszwer (1874–1944), Polish chemist
