= Zofia Sara Syrkin-Binsztejnowa =

Polish-Jewish doctor and social activist

- Born: Sora Syrkin; December 15, 1891; Bielsk Podlaski, Grodno Governorate, Russian Empire
- Died: January 18, 1943 (aged 51)
- Education: Saint Vladimir Imperial University of Kiev
- Occupations: doctor, social activist

Zofia Sara Syrkin-Binsztejnowa (born 15 December 1891 in Bielsk Podlaski, died 18 January 1943) was a Polish-Jewish doctor and social activist, a victim of the Holocaust.

She completed her medical studies in Kyiv. From 1920 to 1921, she played a key role in combating a typhus epidemic in West Galicia. Between 1922 and 1925, she held a high position within the Jewish Health Protection Society in Poland. She was the initiator of establishing a nursing school at the Jewish Hospital in Warsaw. After the start of the German occupation and the establishment of the Warsaw Ghetto, she collaborated with the Jewish Health Protection Society and Jewish Social Self-Help, and for nine months served as the director of the Health Department of the Warsaw Judenrat. She primarily focused on combating typhus epidemics and was also involved in aiding Jewish refugees and displaced persons.

She died in 1943 during the so-called January action in the Warsaw Ghetto.

== Biography ==
=== Education and early career ===
Zofia Sara Syrkin-Binsztejnowa was born on 15 December 1891 (Note: Some sources indicate the year of her birth as 1898 (Heller (2018, p. 326)).) in Bielsk Podlaski. At birth, she was given the name Sora. Her father, Szolom Syrkin, was a merchant by profession. Two of her siblings, brother Efim and sister Fanny, also chose a medical career.

She completed her secondary education in Białystok. At that time, women in Tsarist Russia were not allowed to attend university. Consequently, she likely began studying at private Higher Women's Courses in Kyiv in 1910, which were designed for women seeking medical education. Shortly thereafter, in 1911, the Tsarist authorities liberalized regulations regarding women's education, granting graduates of the Higher Courses equivalent qualifications to university graduates. This new law also enabled her to sit for final exams at the Saint Vladimir Imperial University of Kyiv in the spring of 1915. After successfully passing the exams, she received her medical diploma on May 30 of that year.

After completing her education, she moved to Moscow. Her first workplace was the Red Cross hospital in the capital. She then worked as a sanitary physician in municipal health services before becoming a school doctor. After the outbreak of the Russian Revolution in 1917, she returned to Kyiv. There, she worked at the university hospital as an assistant. When the Russian Civil War spread to Ukraine, she decided to move to Congress Poland. In October 1918, a month before Poland regained independence, she left Kyiv for Warsaw.

=== Interwar period ===
In the Second Polish Republic, she used the name Zofia. However, she never renounced her Jewish identity. In official documents, she consistently indicated her Jewish nationality, and in the 1930s, she also began using her second name, Sara.

She was likely mobilized into the ranks of the Polish Armed Forces in 1919. Soon after, she became involved in humanitarian activities organized under the auspices of the American Jewish Joint Distribution Committee. In April 1920, she was dispatched to Kraków with the task of organizing a sanitary section at the local branch of the Jewish Relief Committee. Her main responsibility was to combat an epidemic of typhus that was spreading in West Galicia at the time. She organized educational, hygiene, and disinfection campaigns and established sanitary and medical facilities. Using the authority she had as a military doctor acting under the mandates of the Chief Extraordinary Commission for Combating Epidemics, she skillfully combined traditional anti-epidemic measures with more innovative solutions. She tried to tactfully and empathetically address Jewish traditions and social relations, which sometimes posed obstacles in combating typhus. In particular, she actively sought to engage Jewish communities in the prevention and eradication of the epidemic. At her initiative, a night shelter for travelers and refugees and an outpatient clinic were established in Kazimierz. She is credited with liberating the Jewish districts of Kraków from typhus.

Her successes made a significant impression on the leadership of the Joint. In September 1921, she was appointed head of the Health Education and Propaganda Department in the Warsaw branch of this organization. She was one of the initiators of establishing the Jewish Health Protection Society in Poland. Initially, however, she rejected the offer to take a high position within its structure. Ultimately, in November 1922, she was transferred from the Joint to the Jewish Health Protection Society. For the next three years, she held the position of managing director of the society.

Since the Warsaw School of Nursing effectively enforced the principle of numerus nullus, she initiated the establishment of a separate school for Jewish nurses. As a result of her efforts, the Society for the Promotion of the School of Nurses was established in March 1922, and in November of the same year, she became a member of its board. She also developed a curriculum project for the proposed institution. She advocated for a more ambitious teaching program than the one proposed by the American doctor Jacob J. Golub, who was then the director of the Medical and Sanitary Department of the Joint. She argued for a two-year duration of the education program. She expected that Jewish nurses would become promoters of education and hygiene among Jewish masses. At the same time, she believed that the opportunity to practice nursing would enable many Jewish women to gain economic independence. (Note: Her proposals gained recognition from American experts (Heller (2018, p. 329); Ciesielska (2020, p. 101)). Ultimately, however, the first director of the school sent from the United States, Amelia Greenwald, implemented a curriculum that did not incorporate most of Syrkin-Binsztejn's guidelines (Heller (2018, p. 336)).) The activities of the School of Nursing at the Jewish Hospital in Warsaw were formally inaugurated in her presence on 8 July 1923.

Around 1925, she ended her work within the structures of the Jewish Health Protection Society. There is not much information available regarding the further course of her professional career. She likely worked as a school doctor and maintained a private medical practice in Warsaw. In 1936, she was appointed disciplinary commissioner at the Medical Chamber of Warsaw-Białystok. She continued to be socially active. She was a member of the Association of Jewish Physicians and held a leadership position within the Jewish Women's Association (Yiddishe Froyen Asosiatsiye, YFA).

She was a co-founder in 1919 and later, in the 1930s, the chairwoman of the Union of Jewish Women in Poland (Jidiszer Frojen-Farband in Pojln). In 1927, she ran for election to the Warsaw City Council from the 26th position on the list of the Jewish National Block. She did not manage to secure a mandate. She published numerous articles on health and hygiene in the newspaper Nasz Przegląd.

Records indicate that by 1938, she was already retired and no longer practicing medicine. It remains unclear why she chose to retire at the young age of 47.

=== World War II ===
After the outbreak of World War II, she returned to public activity. In the early months of the German occupation, prior to the establishment of the Warsaw Ghetto, she primarily collaborated with Jewish social organizations – the Jewish Health Protection Society and the Jewish Social Self-Help Organization. In the former organization, she served as the chief physician of "points" for refugees. In this position, she supervised the work of doctors and nurses who provided assistance to Jewish refugees and displaced persons arriving in Warsaw at 92 "points" overseen by the Jewish Health Protection Society and the Jewish Social Self-Help Organization.

When typhus began to spread among the Jewish population of Warsaw in the spring of 1940, she focused her efforts on combating the epidemic. She implemented many measures that she had successfully applied between 1920 and 1921. The existing sanitary care department of the Jewish Health Protection Society was transformed into the Department for Fighting Epidemics. Its tasks included organizing disinfection columns and overseeing two bathing facilities and a laundry. The department’s staff, in collaboration with the Jewish Social Self-Help Organization and its affiliated home committees, also organized home inspections and conducted awareness and preventive campaigns.

In November 1940, she found herself in the Warsaw Ghetto. Shortly thereafter, a Health Department was established within the Judenrat, based on the Department for Fighting Epidemics that she led. Its chairman was Izrael Milejkowski, while Syrkin-Binsztejnowa took on a directorial position. This likely occurred in January 1941. She became part of the Health Department’s core leadership. (Note: Ciesielska (2020, pp. 99–100) states that Syrkin-Binsztejnowa served as the chairperson of the Central Health Council within the Judenrat. In reality, this body was established only at the turn of August and September 1941 – shortly before her dismissal from the structures of the Judenrat. The position of chairperson was taken by Professor Ludwik Hirszfeld (Engelking & Leociak (2013, pp. 513–514); Golden (2018, p. 156)).) Furthermore, at her initiative, the Chemical-Bacteriological Institute was established in June or July 1941, which was responsible for controlling the suitability of food products sold in the ghetto and the quality of vaccines delivered there. However, she continued to focus on combating the typhus epidemic (its peak occurred in the summer of 1941). In light of the Nazi policy aimed at degrading and exterminating the Jewish population, however, her efforts were doomed to failure.

On 28 August 1941, a large-scale delousing operation was carried out on Krochmalna Street, considered a breeding ground for infectious diseases. Officers from the German Ordnungspolizei, the Polish Blue Police, and the Jewish Ghetto Police, under the supervision of German officials and with the help of Polish and Jewish doctors, blocked Krochmalna Street, then expelled several thousand residents from their homes, intending to take them to public baths. Meanwhile, delousing was conducted in their homes. However, the operation quickly turned into a "medical and humanitarian disaster". Some Jews had to wait outdoors for nearly 24 hours without water or food. In the meantime, members of the disinfection columns plundered the abandoned apartments. When food was finally delivered to the starving, due to a lack of containers, they had to scoop it with hats or even with their bare hands. The chief city physician (Amtsarzt) Dr. Wilhelm Hagen, who was likely the initiator of the action, blamed Syrkin-Binsztejnowa for this debacle. During a meeting with Judenrat chairman Adam Czerniaków on September 15 that year, he forced her dismissal from the Health Department.

It is uncertain what she did in the later period. She likely continued to collaborate with the Jewish Health Protection Society and the Jewish Social Self-Help Organization. According to Ludwik Hirszfeld, she dealt with hygiene issues in Jewish schools, which the Germans allowed to reopen in September 1941.

She died on 18 January 1943 during the January action in the Warsaw Ghetto. It is possible that she, along with Dr. Jakub Rosenblum, was captured in the provisional Jewish Health Protection Society headquarters at 12 Gęsia Street and taken from there to Umschlagplatz. Dr. Izrael Milejkowski was also on the same transport. According to some accounts, Milejkowski gave a speech to a group of captured medics at Umschlagplatz, after which Syrkin-Binsztejnowa administered a lethal dose of morphine to everyone before taking her own life. Other sources suggest that these events took place on a train heading to the Treblinka extermination camp, with some accounts indicating that Syrkin-Binsztejnowa, Milejkowski, and Rosenblum ingested potassium cyanide on the train.

== Bibliography ==
- Ciesielska, Maria (2020). "Amelia Greenwald i Szkoła Pielęgniarstwa przy Szpitalu Starozakonnych na Czystem w Warszawie" [Amelia Greenwald and the Nursing School at the Old Jewish Hospital in Czyste, Warsaw]. Medycyna Nowożytna (in Polish). 26 (1): 93–139. doi:10.4467/12311960MN.20.005.12621. ISSN 2657-506X.
- Engelking, Barbara; Leociak, Jacek (2013). Getto warszawskie. Przewodnik po nieistniejącym mieście [The Warsaw Ghetto: A Guide to the Non-Existent City] (in Polish). Warsaw: Stowarzyszenie Centrum Badań nad Zagładą Żydów. ISBN 978-83-63444-28-0.
- Golden, Juliet D. (2018). ""Show that you are really alive": Sara-Zofia Syrkin-Binsztejnowa's Emergency Medical Relief and Public Health Work in Early Interwar Poland and the Warsaw Ghetto". Medizinhistorisches Journal. 53. doi:10.25162/medhist-2018-0006. ISSN 0025-8431.
- Heller, Daniel Kupfert (2018). "The Gendered Politics of Public Health". Jewish History. 31. doi:10.1007/s10835-018-9301-9. ISSN 1572-8579.
