= Ignacy Schiper =

Jewish Historian and Activist

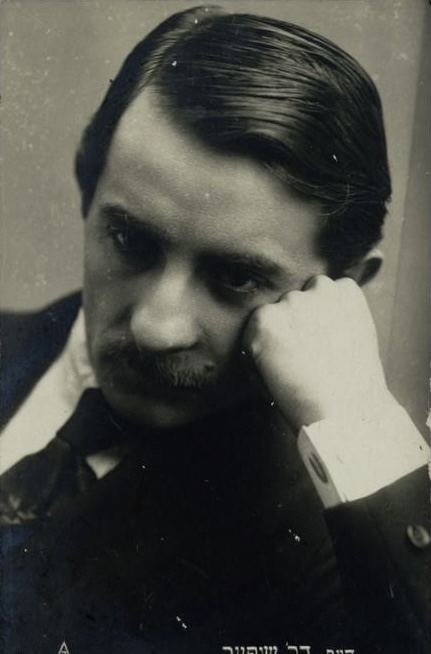
Ignacy Shciper (date unknown)

Ignacy Schiper (November 9, 1884 – early July 1943) was a Galician-born Jewish Polish historian and political activist. He was murdered in the Holocaust.

== Life ==
Schiper was born on November 9, 1884, in Tarnów, Galicia, Austria-Hungary, the son of Mojzesz Schiper.

Schiper studied at a religious elementary school and yeshiva until he was sixteen along with a Polish public school and high school. He then studied law at Jagiellonian University in Kraków from 1905 to 1906 and at the University of Vienna in Vienna from 1905 to 1906. He received a Juris Doctor degree in Kraków in 1907. He was a member of the Vienna Institute for Social Sciences. He contributed to various magazines in Polish, Russian, German, Hebrew, and Yiddish on topics related to Polish Jewish history. He also wrote monographs on great Jewish personalities in Poland and old Polish synagogues. He specialized in the history of the Jewish theater and its art since ancient times. A number of his works appeared in book form. Believing that the study of Jewish spiritual history and its leaders was exhausted, he focused on secular studies like economics and popular culture.

Schiper was an organizer of the first youth group in Western Galicia. He joined Poale Zion in 1903 and soon became one of its leaders as a central committee member and editor of the party organ. During World War I, he enlisted as a private and rose to be a judge advocate by his last year of service. He was elected to the Polish Sejm in 1919 and was active on a number of committees. He initially served as a representative of Poale Zion, although he broke with doctrine Marxism and joined the General Zionists. He was again elected to the Sejm in 1922 and served there until 1927. He never held a regular university post, but he lectured on Jewish economic history at the Institute for Jewish Studies (which was founded in 1927 in Warsaw). He was a frequent contributor to Yiddish and Polish Jewish dailies and monthlies. He served on the YIVO Historical Section, directed the Jewish Academic Home that housed Jewish university students in Warsaw, and headed the Keren Hayesod Palestine Fund in Poland starting in 1935.

Following the German invasion of Poland, Schiper was actively involved with the Jewish Self-Help Society (Żydowska Samopomoc Społeczna) in the Warsaw Ghetto. He participated in meetings of the Oyneg Shabbos project led by Emanuel Ringelblum. He was employed by the Warsaw Jewish Council’s official archive and continued his research and writings. He opposed armed resistance in 1942 and favored helping select individuals escape to the Aryan side. He was ultimately seized from a bunker during the Warsaw Ghetto Uprising and sent to Majdanek, where he was murdered in early July 1943.
