= Juliusz Zweibaum =

Polish scientist and histologist (1887–1959)

Juliusz Zweibaum (1 May 1887 – 6 May 1959) was a Polish scientist and specialist in histology. In 1926, he was among the first to begin studies using cell cultures in Poland. During the Second World War, he helped organize an underground medical school in the Warsaw Ghetto. He survived the holocaust and helped establish histology and embryology at the University of Warsaw.

== Biography ==
Zweibaum was born in a Jewish family in Warsaw and went to the Prague Junior High School and as an active participant in the 1905 school strike, he was expelled. He then studied at the Universities of Liège and Bologna and became a lecturer at the University of Modena from 1912 to 1916. He established the department of histology and embryology at the University of Warsaw in 1933.

During World War II, he took part in the defense of Warsaw and was captured and imprisoned in Pawiak. He was released into the Warsaw Ghetto where he organized a sanitary preparation course against epidemics such as typhus which were feared by the Nazi administration. He was the dean of the underground medical school that operated in the Warsaw Ghetto on 84 Leszno Street which operated under difficult circumstances. The school had more than 500 students and was assisted by Professor Edward Loth and Associate Professor Bronisława Konopacka, who provided material and was supported from the Aryan side of Warsaw by Professor Witold Orłowski.

Students would risk their lives going to the school and many of the teachers were killed by German soldiers. Shortly after orders for terminating Jews in the Ghetto were issued, he escaped to the Aryan side and remained in hiding. After the war he headed the department of histology and embryology at the University of Warsaw where he worked until his death.

In 1957, he was awarded the Commander's Cross of the Order of Polonia Restituta. He died, lesd than a week after his 72nd birthday, in Warsaw from Parkinson's disease. He had also suffered from glaucoma. He was interred in the Powązki Military Cemetery.
