= Warsaw Ghetto hunger study =

Holocaust-era medical study

The Warsaw Ghetto Hunger Study was a study taken up by Jewish doctors imprisoned in the Warsaw Ghetto in 1942. The Nazis, intent on starving the ghetto within months, allowed no more than a daily intake of 180 calories per prisoner – less than 10% of the recommended energy intake for a healthy human being – while withholding vaccines and medicine that would be necessary to prevent the spread of disease in the dense ghetto. This resulted in a thriving black market which supplied about 80% of the ghetto's food, and a network of 250 soup kitchens operated by the Joint, which at one time had served as many as 100,000 meals per day.

In February 1942 a group of Jewish doctors headed by Izrael Milejkowski decided to use the famine, which was out of their control, to study the physiological and psychological effects of hunger. Using smuggled supplies, they commenced on a deep study of the various aspects of hunger, including metabolic, cardiovascular, ophthalmological, and immune system changes, among others. Despite the lack of resources, the risk of execution (the Nazis prohibited Jews from scientific work), and their own poor physical conditions, the 28 doctors managed to keep a strict study protocol, including isolation, glycemic load testing, and even pathology.

The study ended in August 1942 with the Grossaktion Warsaw. The study manuscript was smuggled out of the ghetto and kept by the Polish doctor Witold Eugeniusz Orłowski. In 1946, immediately after the end of the war, it was published in Polish and French, and then in English in 1979 by Myron Winick of Columbia University.

According to Winick:

...some of the findings were lost, but what remains is still the most extensive investigation of starvation ever carried out. The physicians described the clinical findings in such detail that their description remains the clearest to date... [It] remains a major building block in our understanding of the effects of severe malnutrition on both adults and children. But it is more than that. It is a glimpse into the character of some of the physicians in the Warsaw ghetto.

== See also ==
- First Nations nutrition experiments
- Minnesota Starvation Experiment
