= Jewish Hospital, Warsaw =

Coordinates: 52.226°N 20.97116°E

The Jewish Hospital in Warsaw
- Szpital Starozakonnych w Warszawie
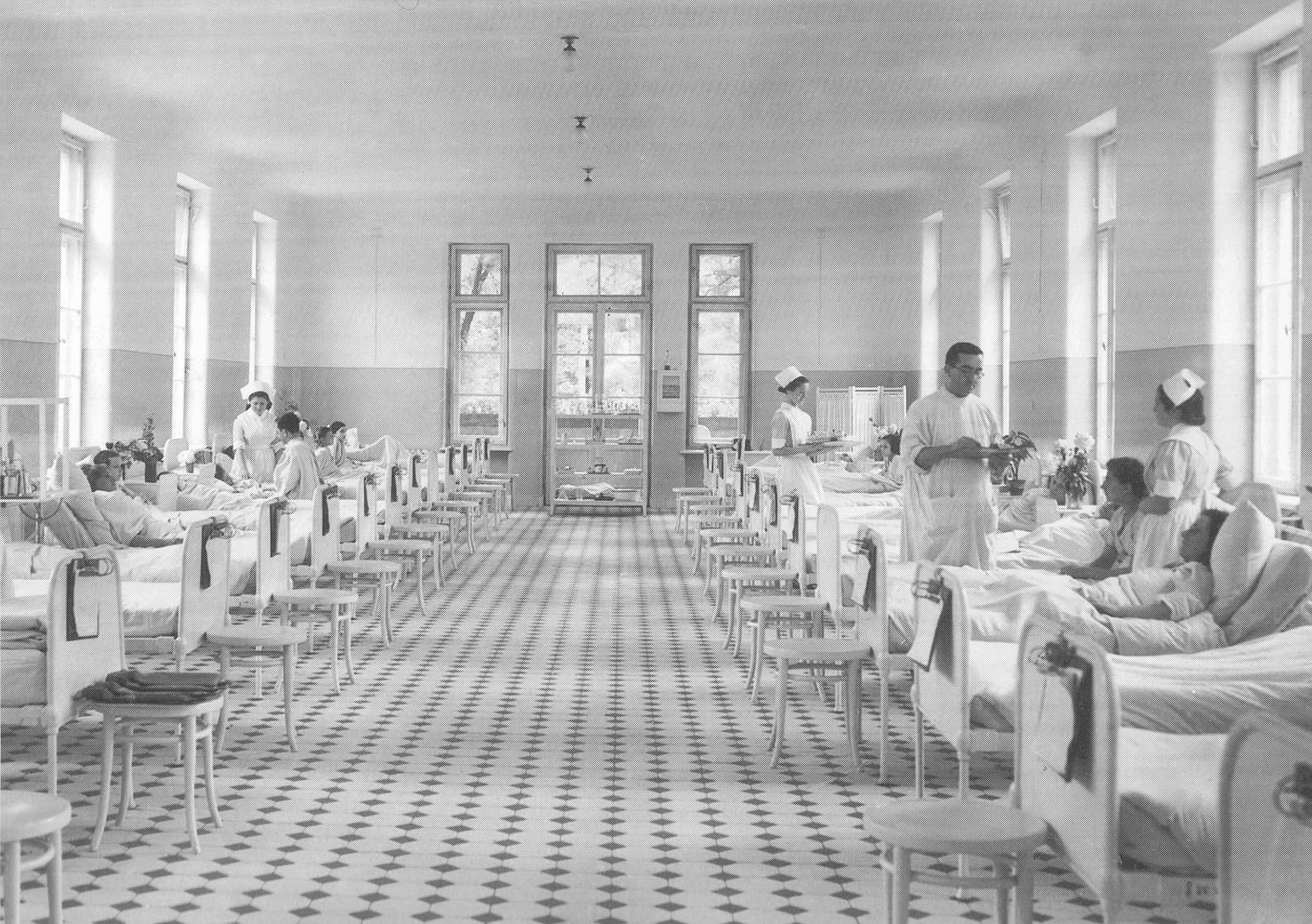
- The Jewish Hospital in Warsaw in 1939

- Location within Warsaw
- Alternative names: The Jewish Hospital in Czyste; Szpital Starozakonnych w Czyste

General information
- Location: Warsaw, Poland
- Opened: 1902; 124 years ago

The Jewish Hospital in Warsaw, The Jewish Hospital in Czyste - a Jewish medical facility operating from 1902 to 1943 in Warsaw. For many years considered to be one of the best and most modern hospitals in Poland.

The whole complex consisted of 8 separate hospital pavilions with surgical, ophthalmic and gynecological wards, skin and venereal diseases, pulmonary, throat and ear diseases, infectious, internal and nervous diseases, mental diseases and a midwifery with a research laboratory.

The hospital also included an administration building, a synagogue, a pre-burial house, kitchens, laundries, freezers, a boiler room, a coach house, stables, a disinfection chamber, a food warehouse, a convalescent home and other smaller buildings. In total, there were 17 buildings for different purposes.

== History ==
=== Construction and opening ===
The idea of building a new Jewish hospital was born in the 80s of the 19th century, among doctors of the Old Jewish Hospital, headed by Dr. Józef Kinderfreund.

On June 25, 1883, Dr. Zygmunt Kramsztyk published in the "Kurier Warszawski" an article entitled "The New Hospital", in which he presented the construction assumptions and postulates in this matter. It gained the support of Warsaw physicians, a broad public opinion and the Warsaw Jewish community, with its president Ludwik Natanson at the forefront.

In April 1887 the Hospital Building Committee was established, headed by Ludwik Natanson and then Michał Berson after his death. The committee was divided into general, medical, financial, technical and legal sections. In July 1887, the committee held its inaugural meeting and since then funds have been raised for the construction of the hospital. Among the donors were famous citizens of the city, Jewish intelligentsia and ordinary people.

The committee decided on June 26, 1890, that the hospital would be built on the land of the estates of Wielka Wola and Czyste, repurchased from the owners: Biernacki, Rodkiewicz and Pieńkowski. The entire plot had an area of 6.7 hectares. The plan was approved by the Warsaw City Council for Public Charity in April 1893.

The construction of the hospital was ceremonially started in May 1894. A cornerstone was laid in the foundation of the future hospital synagogue and a parchment box was laid, where a short history of the hospital's construction was written in Polish and Hebrew, as well as several Warsaw magazines. Artur Goebel, in cooperation with Czesław Domaniewski, was the author of the hospital's project. It was based on the most modern medical facilities in Western Europe.

The first hospital ward was opened in January 1898 – a pavilion for the insane, equipped with bed linen, underwear and clothes provided by the so-called Women's Committee, which in the future also took care of supply of the other wards. In December 1898, in order to speed up the process of obtaining funds for the finishing and furnishing of other buildings, the board of the Jewish community granted a loan in bonds in the amount of 400,000 roubles.

The first patients were admitted to the hospital in April 1902. The ceremonial opening of the hospital took place on June 22 of the same year and started with a service in the hospital's synagogue. Speeches were delivered by Michał Berson, President of the Building Committee, and Dr. Zygmunt Kramsztyk, the hospital's chief physician. The construction cost of the hospital was over 1,200,000 roubles.

At that time, the hospital was the most modern and best equipped medical facility in Warsaw. For the first time in Poland, a low-pressure steam central heating system was used, along with gas and electric lighting, a power generating unit, ventilation, sewerage and water supply systems, and its own well.

On November 1, 1907, in connection with a new law, the hospital was placed under the administration of the magistrate of the city of Warsaw. In 1909–1911, a new two-store pavilion was built for the needs of the internal and neurological wards, followed by the opening of a physiotherapy workshop.

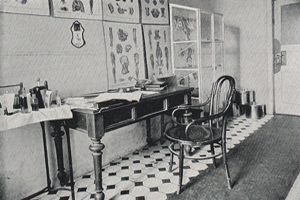
Doctor cabinet in Szpital na Czystem

=== Interwar period ===
In the interwar period, a new wing was built in the psychiatric pavilion, whose patients were moved to Choroszcza near Białystok, and a ward for tuberculosis patients was opened. A famous nursing school was also established. At the beginning of 1922, the first issue of the "Clinical Quarterly of The Jewish Hospital" was published, which contained materials from scientific meetings. In the second half of the 1930s, the Jewish Hospital became the largest closed-circuit medical centre in the capital. There were 1100 beds in 1937. Before the outbreak of World War II, the hospital already had 1500 beds and employed 147 doctors, 119 nurses and 6 pharmacists.

=== Doctor Flatau Institute of Pathology ===
The construction of the Pathological Institute began in 1923 according to the plans of the builder Stifelman. The Pathological Institute was to be an institution providing access to modern ambiguous and therapeutic techniques and was to follow the rapid scientific development of medicine at that time. Initially, $6,000 from J.D.C. was obtained for the construction of the building and additional $28,000 raised among the Warsaw Jews. That money allowed to build a skeleton of the new building in 1926. It was to include a pathological anatomy department, a biology and therapy department, a chemistry and bacteriology department, an auditorium for 100 people and a reading room. One of the founders of the Pathological Institute was Edward Flatau. The institute was opened in 1933, one year after Flatau's death, and was named the "Dr. Flatau Pathological Institute". In August 1933, "Nasz Przegląd Ilustrowany" published on its first page a photo entitled "Before the opening of the most important Jewish research institution in Warsaw", however, the institution had to struggle with a lack of funds for a long time.

=== World War II ===
Immediately after the outbreak of World War II, most of the medical personnel were conscripted into the army, which resulted in a shortage of personnel in the hospital. During the air raids, the surgical pavilion and all operating rooms were destroyed. Other hospital wards and the kitchen were also damaged. At the same time, due to its location, the hospital became a front post again. At the time of Warsaw's capitulation the hospital cared for 5000 wounded soldiers and civilians.

By order of the German occupation authorities, the hospital, which was under the responsibility of the city magistrate, was transferred to the management of the Jewish community and thus was intended exclusively for Jews. As a result, all non-Jewish patients and staff had to leave the hospital and hundreds of sick and injured Jews from other hospitals were brought to this place. It resulted in a huge overcrowding of the hospital. The patients were placed in corridors, attics and on floors.

In the late autumn of 1939, due to worsening sanitary conditions, a typhus epidemic broke out and the hospital was completely isolated for six weeks. In February 1941, by the decision of the German occupation authorities, the Jewish Hospital was moved to its new headquarters in the Warsaw Ghetto and operated there until 1943.

From September 1939 to February 1941 was the most tragic period in the history of the hospital. It was cold in the wards, there was a shortage of food, medicine and personnel. From time to time, there was no electricity, water or gas supply. The hospital was constantly overpopulated.

During the ghetto's operation, a team of Jewish doctors working in the hospital conducted research on hunger, some of the results were published in 1946 in the book Hunger Disease. Clinical research on hunger carried out in the Warsaw Ghetto in 1942.

The Holy Spirit Hospital and the Treasury Hospital were moved to the abandoned pavilions of the Jewish Hospital. In June 1941, when the German-Soviet war broke out, both hospitals were evicted and a German military hospital was established in their place.

=== Post-war period ===
After the end of the war, the Holy Spirit Hospital was moved back into the abandoned pavilions and later renamed the Municipal Hospital No. 1. In the 1950s, the Wola Hospital was moved to the pavilions and is still here today.

=== Doctors associated with the hospital ===
- Adam Wizel, assistant at the department of neurology (from 1890)
- Samuel Goldflam, volunteer physician at the neurological department (1922–1932)
- Edward Flatau, Head of the neurology department since 1904
- Zygmunt Kramsztyk, chief physician from 1898 to 1904, head of the ophthalmic ward from 1879.
- Teofil Simchowicz, volunteer physician (from 1904 to 1911) and assistant (from 1911) at the neurological department
- Julian Rotstadt, head of the physical and mechanical therapy unit, director of the hospital in 1939
- Maurycy Bornsztajn, head of the psychiatric ward (since 1908)
- Orko Sołowiejczyk, assistant physician at the surgical ward (from 1898)
- Izrael Milejkowski, dermatologist and venerologist (from 1923)
- Juliusz Mutermilch. head of the ophthalmic ward
- Gerszon Lewin, head of the internal ward (from ca. 1918)
- Wilhelm Rubin, assistant physician
- Stanisław Klajn, head of internal branch
- Leon Lipszowicz, volunteer physician at the neurological ward
- Ignacy Sznajderman, assistant physician at the neurological ward
- Ludwik Eliasz Bregman, head of the neurological department
- Bronisław Berek Karbowski, head of the otolaryngological department (1933–1939)
- Władysław Sterling, head of the neurological department after 1932
- Adam Zamenhof, head of the ophthalmology department, director of the hospital (since 1939)
- Natan Mesz, head of the X-ray department (since 1918)
- Józef Stefan Szper, head of the surgical ward (since 1934)
- Wiktor Arkin, doctor in the ophthalmological ward from 1923 to 1940
- Stanisław Leopold Lubliner, laryngologist and physiatrist until 1937.
- Kamilla Horwitz.
