= Mieczysław Centnerszwer =

Polish chemist

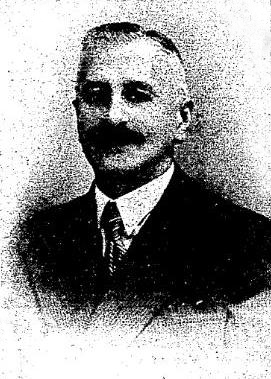
Mieczysław Centnerszwer

Mieczysław Centnerszwer (Polish pronunciation: [mjɛˈt͡ʂɨs.waf tsɛntnɛrʂfɛr]; July 10, 1874 – March 27, 1944) was a Polish chemist and professor at the Technical University of Riga and at the University of Warsaw. He was killed by the Gestapo, as a Jew in hiding.

== Life ==
Centnerszwer was born in Warsaw, son of Gabriel Centnerszwer (1841–1917) and was a grandson of the mathematician Jakub Centnerszwer. He studied chemistry at the University of Leipzig and received a doctorate in 1898 under the supervision of Wilhelm Ostwald. While in Leipzig, he met Franciszka Anna Beck, who converted to Judaism and they married in 1900. He worked as a professor at the Riga Polytechnic from 1917 to 1919 and then at the University of Latvia until 1929. In 1932 he became head of physical chemistry at the University of Warsaw. He was forced by the Nazi administration to divorce his wife in 1940 and she was allowed to stay in the Aryan side of Warsaw while he was sent off to a ghetto. He continued to teach physics and chemistry at Juliusz Zweibaum's courses (Zweibaum conducted an underground medical training school) and continued to work until July 1942. He escaped before the ghetto residents were to be killed and hid in his wife's home. He was revealed by a caretaker's son and shot by the Gestapo on March 27, 1944 in front of his wife. He was buried in the Powązki Cemetery.

Centnerszwer, research was in the field of chemical kinetics, corrosion, and equilibrium in multiphase systems. He published over 100 research papers. In 1928 he was awarded the title of Officier d'Academie Francaise and in 1929, received the Latvian Order of Three Stars.
