= Izrael Milejkowski =

Polish Jewish physician

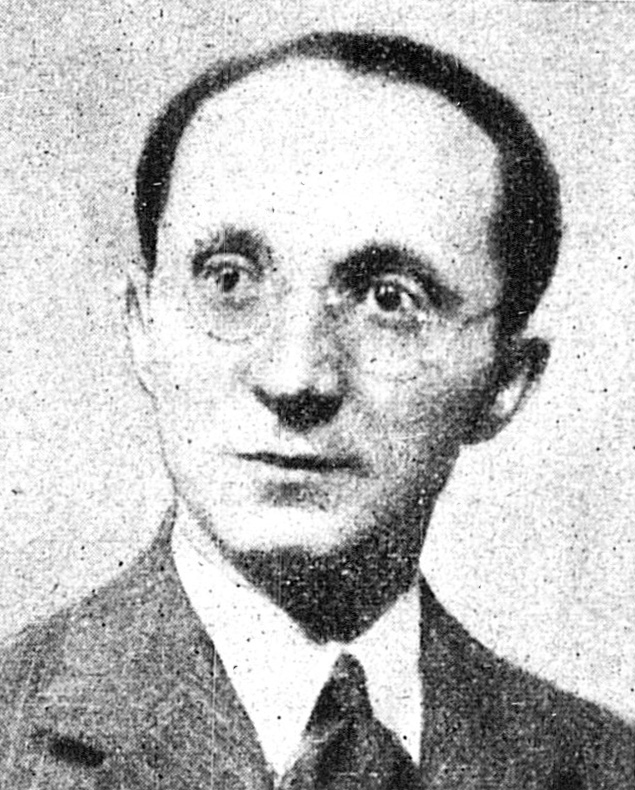
Izrael Milejkowski, 1933

Izrael Milejkowski (Hebrew: ישראל מילייקובסקי; July 17, 1887 – January 1943) was a Polish-Jewish dermatologist and civic activist in Warsaw. He is known for extensive research on effects of starvation while in Warsaw Ghetto.

== See also ==
- Zofia Sara Syrkin-Binsztejnowa, another Warsaw Ghetto doctor and activist
