= January action in the Warsaw Ghetto =

Nazi deportation action in the Warsaw Ghetto

The January action in the Warsaw Ghetto, also known as the second liquidation action or January self-defense, was an extermination operation conducted by German occupation forces in the Warsaw Ghetto from 18 to 21 January 1943. Its primary goal was the deportation of approximately 8,000 Jews – mainly those residing illegally in the closed district – to the Treblinka extermination camp. This marked the first deportation action in the ghetto to encounter organized armed resistance from the Jewish resistance movement.

During Grossaktion Warsaw in the summer of 1942, approximately 300,000 Jews were murdered. In the significantly reduced "residual ghetto" that remained, around 60,000 inhabitants survived, including an estimated 40% living illegally without employment certificates issued by the occupiers. This situation had been temporarily tolerated by the Germans, but during an inspection in Warsaw on 9 January 1943, Reichsführer-SS Heinrich Himmler ordered the immediate deportation of 8,000 "illegal" Jews and the relocation of German-run production facilities (known as "shops") to the Lublin Land. On 18 January, German forces and their collaborators entered the ghetto. They encountered widespread passive resistance, as Jews ignored calls to assemble voluntarily and hid in bunkers and concealed shelters. Despite being caught by surprise, the Jewish Combat Organization initiated armed fighting to defend the population.

After four days, the Germans withdrew from the ghetto. At least 5,000 Jews were deported and murdered at Treblinka, with 1,171 others killed on the streets or in their homes. Although the Germans did not intend full liquidation of the ghetto at this stage, the halt to the operation was credited to the Jewish resistance. The Jewish Combat Organization's authority among ghetto inhabitants grew substantially, and its actions earned admiration from the Polish population and the Polish Underground State. When German forces re-entered the ghetto on 19 April 1943, the full-scale Warsaw Ghetto Uprising erupted, which they suppressed only after nearly a month.

== Warsaw Ghetto after Grossaktion Warsaw ==
On 22 July 1942, German occupation forces commenced Grossaktion Warsaw in the Warsaw Ghetto. It lasted 62 days, resulting in a reduction of more than 300,000 in the number of inhabitants of the closed district. At least 253,742 Jews, and possibly more, were deported and murdered in the Treblinka extermination camp. Approximately 10,300 people died or were murdered within the ghetto territory, while a further 11,580 were transported to various labor camps. A number of Jews, difficult to determine but estimated at up to around 8,000, managed to escape to the "Aryan side".

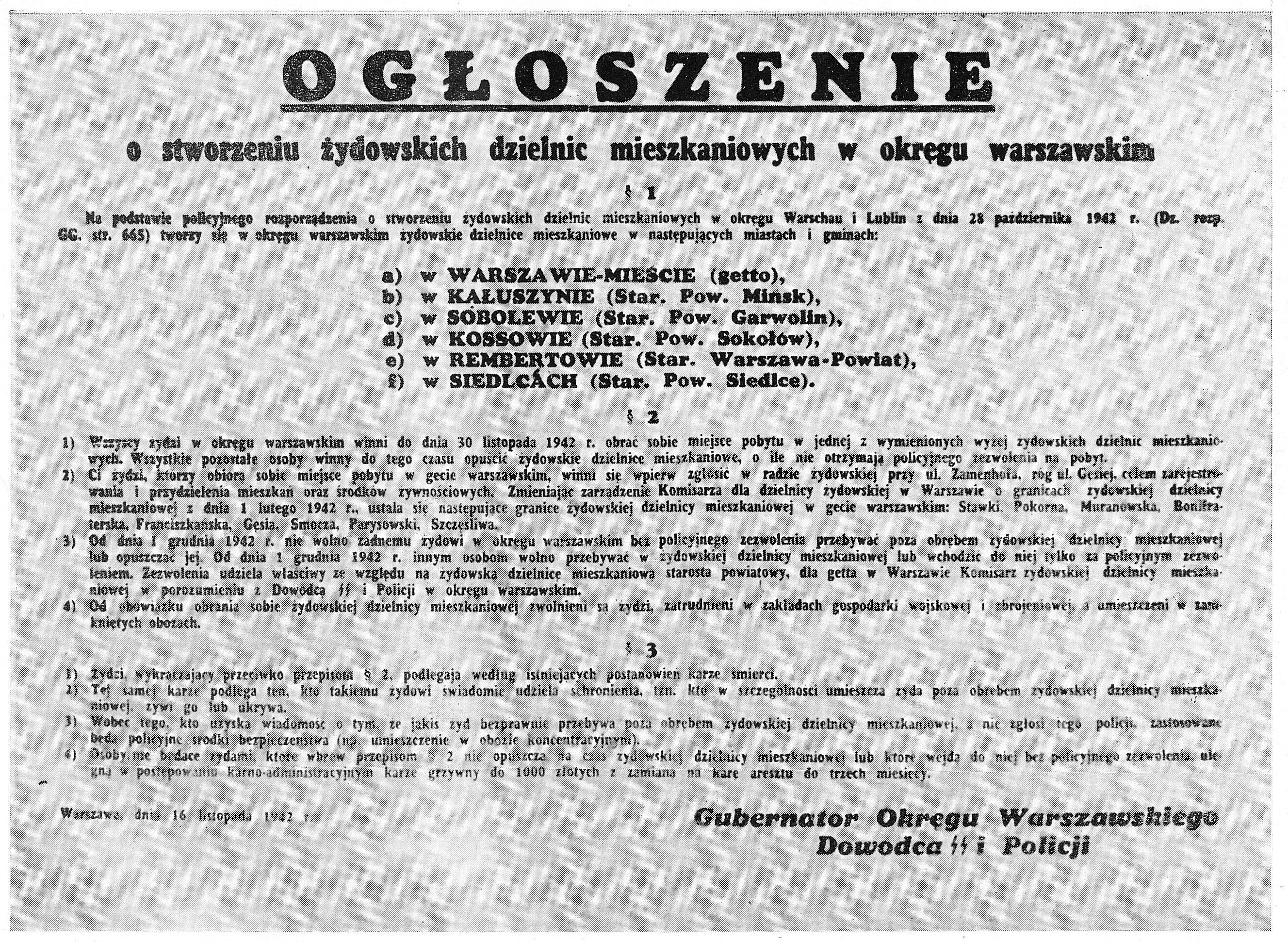
German announcement informing about the creation of "residual ghettos" in six cities of the Warsaw District, including Warsaw

On 28 October 1942, the Higher SS and Police Leader "East" (HSSPF "Ost"), SS-Obergruppenführer Friedrich-Wilhelm Krüger, issued an order concerning the establishment of so-called residual ghettos (German: Restgetto) in selected cities of the Lublin and Warsaw districts. On 10 November, he issued a similar order regarding the creation of residual ghettos in the Galicia, Kraków, and Radom districts. These became the only places in the General Government where Jews were permitted to reside legally. The closed district in Warsaw was one of six such ghettos in the Warsaw District. Krüger's order allowed Jews hiding on the "Aryan side" until 30 November 1942 to relocate to the residual ghettos, with failure to comply punishable by death.

According to official data, after Grossaktion Warsaw only 35,639 Jews remained in the Warsaw Ghetto. As many as 75.5% were people aged 20–50, with a ratio of 78 women per 100 men. Children up to 9 years of age and people over 60 constituted 1.4% and 1.5% respectively of the official ghetto population. German statistics did not, however, include "wild" or "illegal" Jews who had survived Grossaktion Warsaw and remained in the ghetto territory but – unlike registered Jews – lacked the so-called life numbers. Their number was estimated at around 20,000–25,000.

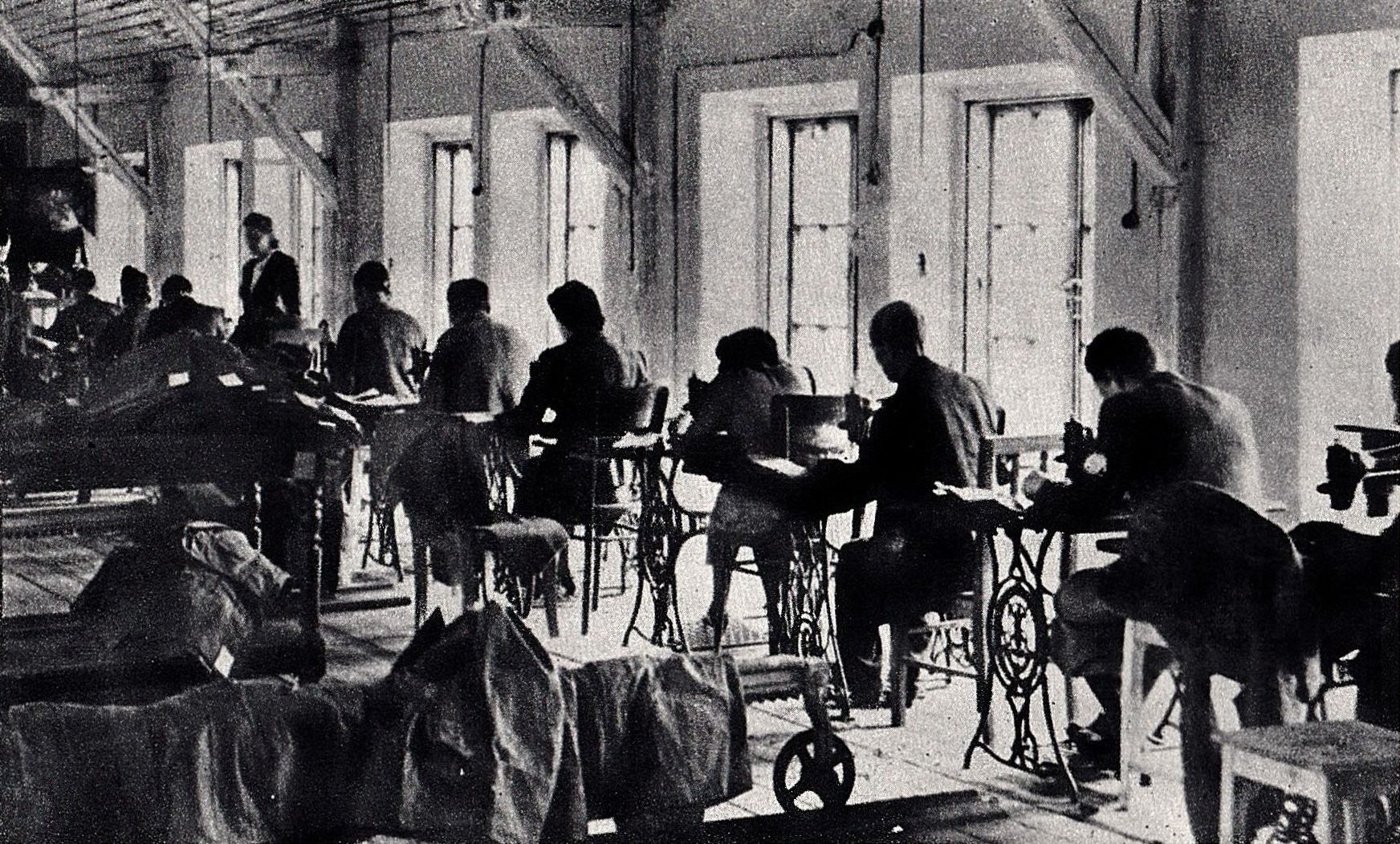
One of the shops in the Warsaw Ghetto

Jews who survived Grossaktion Warsaw were subjected to forced labor. Of the 35,639 registered people, the largest number – around 26,000 – worked in German enterprises (shops) located in the ghetto territory. A further 2,797 were employed in Judenrat agencies, while the remainder worked at posts outside the ghetto or in the Werterfassungsstelle commando. The latter was responsible for clearing abandoned apartments and premises of valuable items and employed around 4,000 Jews, including many "wild" ones. Most workers were required to work on piece work and received only food stamps entitling them to minimal allocations. In practice, the majority of Jews subsisted by selling their possessions or purchasing food from "square traders" or smugglers who brought it in from the "Aryan side".

A further consequence of Grossaktion Warsaw was a significant reduction in the area of the ghetto. The territories south of Leszno Street, as well as the northern side of that street between Karmelicka and Przejazd streets, were excluded from the ghetto and designated for Polish residence. However, an enclave remained in this area in the form of Walther Többens' shop near Prosta Street. The main part of the Warsaw residual ghetto henceforth consisted of the so-called central ghetto, bounded by the streets: Stawki – Pokorna – Muranowska – Bonifraterska – Franciszkańska – Gęsia – Smocza – Parysowska – Szczęśliwa. This section contained the Judenrat offices, six shops, and the headquarters of the Werterfassungsstelle. It also served as the primary refuge for most "illegal" Jews and as the residence of "square traders". In the territories between Gęsia and Franciszkańska streets to the north and Leszno Street to the south, officially uninhabited ("wild") areas intermingled with four closed zones occupied by individual shops, which also formed part of the residual ghetto. These zones were:

- the main shop area (bounded by Leszno – Żelazna – Nowolipie – Smocza – Nowolipki – Karmelicka streets),
- the brushmakers' shop area (bounded by Bonifraterska – Świętojerska – Wałowa streets and the rear of Franciszkańska Street),
- the Oschmann-Leszczyński shop area (near Nowolipie and Mylna streets),
- the Weigle tannery area (the odd-numbered side of Gęsia Street, between Smocza and Okopowa streets).

Of the registered Jews, the majority – around 22,700 – lived in shop territories, with a further 12,800 in the central ghetto. They were allocated 295 buildings, while "illegals" resided in an additional 133 buildings.

After the conclusion of Grossaktion Warsaw, the ghetto largely ceased to function as a residential district and became a vast labor camp. Its streets and many buildings were largely deserted. For a time, the Transferstelle (Note: The Transferstelle was established in December 1940 within the office of the governor of the Warsaw District. All official commodity traffic between the ghetto and the "Aryan side" took place through it (Engelking & Leociak (2013, p. 112)).) and the office of the commissioner for the Jewish district continued to exist, but authority over all matters concerning the ghetto passed to functionaries of the Warsaw Gestapo, who operated from the so-called Befehlstelle at 103 Żelazna Street. The Judenrat and the Jewish Ghetto Police were stripped of any significant competencies and completely lost authority among the Jewish population. In the autumn of 1942, shop territories began to be enclosed with wooden fences and barbed wire. The shops increasingly resembled small labor camps, or as Abraham Lewin described them, "closed prisons". Isolation was such that workers in one shop often had no contact for long periods with relatives or friends in other parts of the ghetto. The shops also became partially self-sufficient, operating their own bakeries, stores, and service facilities. Within them, German owners and the subordinate factory guard (Werkschutz) exercised absolute authority. (Note: The Werkschutz consisted primarily of Jews, often former policemen or individuals from the social margins. Ukrainians and Volksdeutsche could also be found in its ranks (Sakowska (1975, p. 315); Gutman (1993, p. 375)).) Even minor infractions brought penalties such as fines, reduced food rations, or removal from the workforce and transfer to the SS.

On 28 September 1942, an announcement signed by Judenrat chairman Marek Lichtenbaum was posted throughout the ghetto. It stated that, under an order from the Sonderkommando der Sipo-Umsiedlung, Jews in the area south of Gęsia and Franciszkańska streets were permitted to move only in organized columns to or from their workplaces. In the central ghetto, between the working hours of 8:00 AM and 8:00 PM, only those who could demonstrate a legitimate need to leave their workstation were allowed on the streets. Street trading was banned, as was "aimless loitering or gathering in groups". As a result, during daylight hours the ghetto streets typically saw only Jewish Ghetto Police personnel, columns of workers marching in formation, carts delivering food to the shops, and carts removing corpses. German patrols shot without warning at anyone else found on the streets. Judenrat records show that 546 Jews were killed on the ghetto streets between October and December 1942.

== Jewish resistance movement ==
=== Failure of self-defense attempts in the summer of 1942 ===
The mass deportations to Treblinka during the summer of 1942 encountered essentially no active resistance from the inhabitants of the Warsaw Ghetto. The Jewish population – consisting primarily of women, children, the elderly, and individuals physically and mentally exhausted by years of hunger and isolation – was unable to mount opposition to the German actions. Meanwhile, underground organizations, lacking weapons and sufficient authority, were incapable of organizing self-defense or rallying the ghetto residents to fight. As Israel Gutman has noted, "many activists and entire groups opposed the idea of armed resistance". In the early days of Grossaktion Warsaw, leaders of the major Jewish political parties rejected the notion of an armed uprising, mistakenly believing that the "resettlement" would affect only a portion of the population. Soon thereafter, the efforts of underground groups shifted toward saving their own members from deportation.

This stance of the traditional parties contrasted sharply with the position of the youth movements. On 28 July 1942, representatives of Dror, Hashomer Hatzair, and Akiva established the Jewish Combat Organization. Its command included Szmuel Bresław, Yitzhak Zuckerman, Zivia Lubetkin, Mordechai Tenenbaum, and Izrael Kanal. The new organization aimed to resist the deportations through armed force, but it lacked a concrete plan of action. Internal differences emerged over tactics, and its armament consisted of only a single pistol. An emissary, Izrael Chaim Wilner, was sent to the "Aryan side" to seek support. He established contact with the Home Army only after several weeks. Somewhat earlier, on 21 August 1942, the Jewish Combat Organization received its first small shipment of weapons from the communist Polish Workers' Party.

On 20 August, Izrael Kanal carried out an unsuccessful assassination attempt on Józef Szeryński, the commander of the Jewish Ghetto Police. Jewish Combat Organization members also attempted to set fire to abandoned houses and warehouses of liquidated shops, seeking to prevent confiscated property from falling into German hands. The organization issued leaflets and appeals warning that "resettlement" meant death and urging the population to engage in passive resistance while defying orders from the Jewish Ghetto Police. Plans to defend "the honor of Warsaw Jews" through armed action were, however, disrupted by events on 3 September 1942. On that day, the Gestapo arrested Józef Kapłan, and Szmuel Bresław was shot by a German patrol on Gęsia Street. The organization's entire stock of weapons was seized when courier Reginka Justman attempted to move it from a hiding place at 63 Miła Street to a new location at 34 Dzielna Street. These setbacks temporarily paralyzed Jewish Combat Organization's activity. In the final days of Grossaktion Warsaw, some activists were prepared to launch a suicidal attack on the Germans, but the prevailing view was to postpone armed resistance until weapons could be acquired and underground structures strengthened.

=== Consolidation of the underground in the autumn of 1942 ===
In the autumn of 1942, a period of temporary stabilization prevailed in the Warsaw Ghetto. German authorities declared that the "resettlement" had been permanently concluded and that the remaining Jews would be required only to demonstrate "obedience and diligent work performance". Despite official prohibitions, smuggling and black-market trade revived. At the turn of September and October, surviving medical and nursing staff organized a new hospital in two buildings at 6/8 Gęsia Street. (Note: The hospital at Gęsia Street had 400 beds. It comprised two surgical wards as well as paediatric, internal medicine and infectious diseases wards. The position of director was held by Dr. Józef Stein (Ciesielska (2017, pp. 226–227)).) On 22 November 1942, several hundred Jews who had been detained on the Umschlagplatz since Grossaktion Warsaw were released. The presence of "illegal" Jews was also tolerated by the Germans; many found employment at work posts or in the Werterfassungsstelle. Although no formal amnesty was announced, around 4,500 "wild" individuals who identified themselves during a Judenrat-conducted population census at the end of October 1942 were added to the official ghetto population. The Germans even permitted the establishment of a shelter for abandoned and orphaned children at 50 or 52 Ludwik Zamenhof Street; SS-Untersturmführer Karl Georg Brandt – deputy head of the "Jewish section" in the office of the Commander of the SD and Sicherheitspolizei for the Warsaw District – attended its opening ceremony.

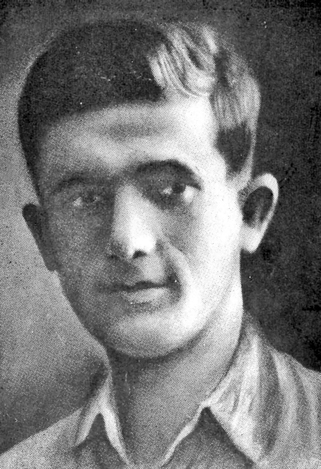
Mordechai Anielewicz

Nevertheless, Grossaktion Warsaw had shattered any remaining illusions among Warsaw Jews about Nazi intentions. It was widely believed that the stabilization was temporary and that another deportation could begin at any time. Many inhabitants were overcome by feelings of resignation and transience; some sought escape in amusements, alcohol, and fleeting relationships. The loss of faith in German promises brought the realization that passivity and submission offered no prospect of survival. As a result, escapes to the "Aryan side" increased. Many Jews, particularly wealthier ones, began constructing hiding places in hopes of surviving a future deportation. This was aided by the fact that, in response to the threat of Soviet air raids, the Germans allowed the building of air-raid shelters in the ghetto and the delivery of construction materials for that purpose. A desire for revenge and resistance also emerged. The growth of the resistance movement was further facilitated by the demographic shift: young and single individuals now predominated in the ghetto population, unencumbered by family responsibilities.

During the autumn of 1942, Jewish Combat Organization activists worked to rebuild and reorganize their underground structures. At the end of October, after prolonged and difficult negotiations, the Jewish Combat Organization's composition was expanded to include representatives of the Bund, Gordonia, Ha-Noar ha-Zion, Poale Zion-Right, Poale Zion-Left, and the Polish Workers' Party. This brought together nearly all major Jewish political groups except the Revisionist Zionists and the religious Orthodox. The Jewish Combat Organization's primary objectives became the defense of the ghetto against any further deportation and the punishment of collaborators and persecutors, including functionaries of the Jewish Ghetto Police, members of the Werkschutz, shop managers, Gestapo informants, and provocateurs. Political oversight of the Jewish Combat Organization was assumed by the Jewish National Committee. Its creation partly responded to expectations from the Polish Underground State, whose leaders preferred to negotiate with a unified representation of Jewish resistance. The committee also prepared the social and material foundations for the anticipated armed struggle and placed itself under the authority of Oneg Shabbat, the ghetto's underground archive. The socialist Bund declined to join the Jewish National Committee but agreed to cooperate through the so-called Coordinating Commission. (Note: According to Barbara Engelking, the Coordinating Commission consisted of Yitzhak Zuckerman and Zivia Lubetkin from Dror, Mordechai Anielewicz and Miriam Hajnsdorf from Hashomer Hatzair, Abraham Blum from the Bund, Melech Fajnkind from Poale Zion-Left, Jochanan Morgenstern from Poale Zion-Right and Menachem Kirszenbaum from the General Zionists. Other sources provide a slightly different composition of the commission (Engelking & Leociak (2013, pp. 1462–1463); Gutman (1993, pp. 394–395)).) The statutes of the Jewish Combat Organization, Jewish National Committee, and Coordinating Commission were formally adopted on the night of 1–2 December 1942.

At the head of the Jewish Combat Organization stood Mordechai Anielewicz, a 23-year-old activist from Hashomer Hatzair. His influence on preparations for armed resistance was significant, as he had spent the period of Grossaktion Warsaw in the Dąbrowa Basin and thus remained unaffected by the widespread feelings of discouragement and defeat that afflicted many surviving members of the Jewish resistance. Anielewicz's deputy was Yitzhak Zuckerman from Dror. The Jewish Combat Organization command also included Hirsch Berlinski (Poale Zion-Left), Berek Szajndmil (later replaced by Marek Edelman from the Bund), Jochanan Morgenstern (Poale Zion-Right), and Michał Rozenfeld (Polish Workers' Party). The organization's liaison with the Polish Underground State was Izrael Chaim Wilner. By the end of 1942, the Jewish Combat Organization had at least 600 members.

The Jewish Combat Organization soon began eliminating the most notorious Jewish collaborators. These actions aimed both to punish those who had most actively assisted the Germans during Grossaktion Warsaw and to neutralize individuals who could undermine resistance efforts in any future deportation. Jewish Combat Organization leaders believed that the Germans would not intervene as long as Jewish fighters did not directly target them. On 29 October 1942, Jakub Lejkin – the widely despised acting commander of the Jewish Ghetto Police – was shot on Gęsia Street. On 29 November 1942, Izrael First – head of the Judenrat's economic department and an important Gestapo informant – was killed on Muranowska Street. Several lower-ranking Jewish Ghetto Police functionaries were also assassinated. Couriers and emissaries were dispatched from Warsaw to help establish resistance structures in provincial ghettos. The Jewish underground also secured cooperation with the Polish Underground State. On 11 November 1942, the commander-in-chief of the Home Army, General Stefan Rowecki, codenamed Grot, accepted declarations submitted two days earlier by the Jewish National Committee. These demanded recognition of the committee as the official representative of the Jewish population and requested weapons for the ghetto. Grot pledged assistance to the Jewish Combat Organization in the form of training and arms supplies. The first delivery – 10 pistols in poor condition, accompanied by limited ammunition – arrived from the Home Army in December 1942.

In the autumn of 1942, a second resistance center emerged in the Warsaw Ghetto, linked to the Revisionist New Zionist Organization and especially its youth wing, Betar. The Revisionist fighting force was initially called the Jewish Military Organization and renamed the Jewish Military Union in January 1943. It was led by Paweł Frenkiel and Leon Rodal. The Jewish Combat Organization and Jewish Military Union held unification talks, but a merger proved impossible. Cited reasons included longstanding ideological differences and pre-war animosities, disputes over leadership, the Revisionists' preference for maintaining independent contacts with the Polish underground and retaining their own weapons, and the Jewish Combat Organization's expectation that Revisionists would join individually rather than as a unified group. Nevertheless, the two organizations eventually agreed on a division of spheres of influence and basic principles of cooperation.

== January action ==
=== Prelude ===
In the autumn of 1942, the SS intensified its efforts to secure complete control over the remaining Jewish forced-labor force in the General Government and to establish an independent economic empire. On 9 October 1942, Reichsführer-SS Heinrich Himmler issued an order directing that all Jews previously exempted from deportation to extermination camps and employed in armaments-related production be concentrated in SS-administered camps in Warsaw and Lublin. Over the longer term, the entire Jewish workforce was to be relocated to the Lublin Land, where the SS was establishing an industrial complex that, from March 1943, operated under the name Ostindustrie GmbH (Osti). This enterprise relied on equipment and raw materials seized from Jewish-owned factories and workshops, as well as on Jewish forced laborers.

On 9 January 1943, Himmler visited Warsaw for an inspection that included a tour of the largely deserted ghetto streets. He was surprised to learn that approximately 40,000 Jews remained in the closed district, many residing there illegally. He expressed particular irritation upon discovering that private German firms – fulfilling contracts for the Wehrmacht and employing thousands of Jewish workers – continued to operate within the ghetto. Himmler accused the owners, notably Walther Többens, of greed and deliberate obstruction. In an apparent effort to placate him, the SS and Police Leader for the Warsaw District, SS-Oberführer Ferdinand von Sammern-Frankenegg, assured Himmler that 8,000 "illegal" Jews would be deported to Treblinka without delay. Shortly thereafter – either two days later or on the same day – Himmler wrote to Friedrich-Wilhelm Krüger, expressing dismay that his "prior orders regarding the Jews had not been implemented". He stated that 8,000 residents of the Warsaw Ghetto would be deported "in the coming days" and ordered the immediate cessation of private production in the ghetto, along with the transfer of equipment and workers from the shops to the Lublin Land. Himmler established 15 February 1943 as the deadline for the complete liquidation of the ghetto.

Between 15 and 17 January 1943, SS and Ordnungspolizei units carried out large-scale street roundups in Warsaw, resulting in the detention of several thousand Poles. Von Sammern-Frankenegg exploited the presence of these additional forces to prepare a new deportation operation in the ghetto. Polish underground reports claimed that the action involved 200 German police personnel and 800 Lithuanian and Latvian collaborators, supported by light tanks, though Israel Gutman regards these figures as inflated. Among the officers assigned to the operation was SS-Hauptsturmführer Theodor van Eupen, commandant of the Treblinka labor camp.

Rumors of an impending deportation circulated in the ghetto from early January 1943, contributing to widespread anxiety and despondency among the Jewish population. On 5 January, the Judenrat posted an announcement prohibiting movement between the remnants of the former "large" and "small" ghetto sections without special permits issued by the Befehlstelle, a measure that further intensified the prevailing sense of dread.

=== Course of events ===
On Monday, 18 January 1943, the deportation action began unexpectedly at 6:30 AM when "square traders" preparing to leave for work on the "Aryan side" were detained at the ghetto gates. At the same time, concentrations of German army and police units were observed outside the ghetto walls. Around 7:30 AM, German forces entered the ghetto.

On 18 and 19 January, the operation focused primarily on the central ghetto. On the third day, it extended to the shop territories, though workers in establishments deemed essential to German economic interests were largely spared. The Germans initially planned to capture "illegal" Jews using the same methods as during Grossaktion Warsaw – by imposing blockades on buildings and shops. This time, however, the response of the Jewish population was markedly different. With no remaining illusions about German intentions, residents reacted to reports of troop and police assemblies by hastily seeking refuge in pre-prepared bunkers and hiding places. In many shops, workers failed to report for duty. During blockades, few individuals complied with orders to assemble in courtyards for document checks. The Germans captured the largest number of Jews – approximately 3,000 – on the first day. Those seized included "square traders" detained at the gates, workers apprehended at assembly points, and individuals caught on the streets or in apartments during the initial entry.

Faced with the effectiveness of this passive resistance, German forces quickly resorted to greater brutality. In an effort to meet the deportation quota, SS personnel and policemen conducted street roundups, seizing even those holding valid employment certificates and sending them to the Umschlagplatz. Members of the Judenrat were not exempt; at least nine were deported to Treblinka or shot on the streets. On the Umschlagplatz, several dozen members of the Bund – part of a group led by Boruch Pelc – were executed for refusing to board the train cars. According to Marek Edelman, they were shot personally by Theodor van Eupen.

German forces also targeted the hospital at 6/8 Gęsia Street. On the morning of 18 January 1943, the facility was subjected to a blockade for the first time. More than 300 patients – many suffering from typhus – were deported to Treblinka. Most nurses and orderlies, along with two physicians, Chaim Glauternik and Glebfisz, were deported directly from the hospital. Numerous physicians and nurses living on Kupiecka Street were likewise deported. During the clearance of the hospital, several individuals committed suicide by jumping from windows. Bedridden patients were shot in their beds, as were newborns in the maternity ward. Some staff members and their families survived by hiding for several days in shelters prepared on the hospital premises. After the Germans withdrew from the ghetto, the devastated hospital was reopened. According to Luba Blum-Bielicka:

After the SS men left, corpses remained in beds equipped with surgical traction devices and splints. One boy, deathly pale, survived; the Nazis took him for dead. Newborns lay in pools of blood in beautiful white cribs.

The Jewish resistance had maintained heightened vigilance on Mondays, having observed that German deportation actions typically began on that day. Nevertheless, the operation achieved surprise. The ongoing roundups of Poles on the "Aryan side" in the preceding days had fostered the mistaken belief among ghetto residents that German forces would be too preoccupied elsewhere to launch an action in the ghetto. Organized resistance was further impeded by communication difficulties and the dispersal of fighters: at the start of the operation, most Jewish Combat Organization members were at their residences rather than in barracks. According to Marek Edelman, only five of the Jewish Combat Organization's 50 groups were able to engage spontaneously.

The first shot against German forces was reportedly fired by Izrael Chaim Wilner during a search of a Jewish Combat Organization's safe apartment on Miła Street. The first organized act of resistance, however, came from Hashomer Hatzair members in the building at 61 Miła Street. Anielewicz made the spontaneous decision to initiate fighting without consulting the Jewish National Committee or the rest of the Jewish Combat Organization command. He and a small group of comrades joined a column of Jews being marched to the Umschlagplatz. At the intersection of Niska and Ludwik Zamenhof streets, the fighters suddenly opened fire on the escorts. In the resulting confusion, several dozen Jews escaped. The Germans quickly recovered and returned fire, killing most of the attackers. (Note: Following Bernard Ber Mark, many sources state that 9 fighters fell in this clash (Gutman (1993, p. 421)).) Only three or four fighters survived, including Anielewicz, who reached the gate of a nearby building and was hidden in a bunker by a resident. In retaliation, the Germans set the building on fire.

Armed clashes also occurred at several other locations. When German forces entered the building at 58 Zamenhof Street in the central ghetto, members of Dror and Gordonia residing there – under the command of Yitzhak Zuckerman – attacked them with pistols, grenades, clubs, crowbars, and bottles of sulfuric acid. Two Germans were killed or wounded, forcing the rest to retreat. Jewish Combat Organization units led by Eliezer Geller and Izrael Chaim Wilner engaged in fighting at, among other sites, 40 Zamenhof Street, 34, 41, and 63 Miła Street, and 22 Franciszkańska Street. In the Schultz shop (in the main shop area), resistance was mounted by fighters commanded by Izrael Kanal from Akiva. It remains unclear whether members of the Jewish Military Union participated in organized armed combat during the January action.

The most intense fighting took place on 18 January 1943. From the second day onward, the Jewish Combat Organization generally avoided open confrontations with German forces, adopting a more cautious approach that limited activities to attempts at disarming isolated policemen or soldiers. Taken aback by the unexpected resistance, German units began avoiding locations likely to harbor armed Jews, such as attics and cellars, which reduced the effectiveness of their blockades. At the same time, the Jewish armed response prompted even greater brutality from the occupiers. On 21 January 1943, in reprisal for their losses, German forces shot dozens of people on the ghetto streets.

In contrast to Grossaktion Warsaw, German authorities made only limited use of the Jewish Ghetto Police during the January operation. Its personnel no longer participated directly in blockades or in assembling transports at the Umschlagplatz. Nevertheless, SS personnel occasionally removed small groups of Jewish policemen from their headquarters at 4 Gęsia Street, employing them as scouts or as "human shields". (Note: Emanuel Ringelblum wrote that "the fear of the fighters was so great that the gendarmes and SS men operating in the ghetto were afraid to enter Jewish apartments and sent Jewish Ghetto Police functionaries ahead as scouts. Only when the Jewish Ghetto Police confirmed that there were no armed Jews in a given apartment did the gendarmerie enter to conduct a thorough search" (Ringelblum (1988, pp. 127–128)).) Jewish Ghetto Police members were also compelled to announce German orders to the population. Among the policemen, however, a noticeable lack of zeal in executing these commands was observed; one functionary was reportedly killed by SS men for this reason.

After four days, having concluded that the objective of reducing the ghetto population had been sufficiently achieved, German forces ended the operation and withdrew from the ghetto.

=== Outcome ===
The deportation attempt targeting "illegal" Jews became known as the "second resettlement action" or "second liquidation action". It is also commonly referred to as the January action. Because German forces encountered armed resistance, the events are sometimes designated the January self-defense.

According to Barbara Engelking, the Germans deported no more than 5,000 Jews to Treblinka over the four days, with an additional 1,171 Jews shot in the ghetto. Other estimates place the number deported at 6,000 or 6,500 – the latter figure appearing in the Stroop Report. Emanuel Ringelblum gave the highest contemporary assessment, suggesting around 10,000 total victims, including about 1,000 killed on the spot. Israel Gutman, citing Polish underground sources that noted only half the train cars on the Umschlagplatz were filled, concluded that the actual number deported and murdered ranged from 4,500 to 5,000.

Among those killed in the ghetto or deported to Treblinka were:

- Michał Brandstätter (teacher and journalist),
- Ber Ajzyk Ekerman (journalist, Aguda activist, and head of the Judenrat cemetery department),
- Yitzhak Gitterman (social activist, long-time director of the Polish branch of the Joint, and member of Oneg Shabbat),
- Gustawa Jarecka (writer and Oneg Shabbat collaborator),
- Izrael Milejkowski (dermatologist and chairman of the Judenrat health department),
- Bolesław Rozensztadt (lawyer and chairman of the Judenrat legal department),
- Adolf Różański (historian and activist in Jewish Social Self-Help),
- Zofia Sara Syrkin-Binsztejnowa (physician, social activist, and member of the Judenrat health department leadership),
- Bernard Zundelewicz (pre-war president of the Central Association of Small Jewish Merchants).

Abraham Lewin (teacher, Oneg Shabbat member, and author of a major ghetto diary) was likely also among the victims. Most remaining graduates of the Nursing School attached to the Hospital of the Jewish Community perished, including nurses Prużańska, S. Fryd, Katz, Swierdzioł, Michelburg, and Niemcówna. The school's director, Luba Blum-Bielicka, and nurses Gurfinkiel-Glocer and Isserlis survived by hiding in a bunker. (Note: According to Luba Blum-Bielicka, only 42 out of 400 students of the Nursing School attached to the Hospital of the Jewish Community survived the war, including just one from the final cohort that completed the course on 8 July 1942 (Ciesielska (2020, pp. 132–133)).)

The January fighting inflicted heavy losses on the Jewish Combat Organization fighters. Marek Edelman estimated that four-fifths of the organization's original membership was lost. German casualties remain uncertain, as Ferdinand von Sammern-Frankenegg likely did not report losses sustained in combat with Jewish fighters to his superiors. Polish underground sources and Emanuel Ringelblum claimed several dozen Germans killed, but this figure is almost certainly exaggerated. Barbara Engelking assesses that approximately 12 Germans died during the January self-defense.

== Epilogue ==
Although the objective of the January action was not the complete liquidation of the ghetto but rather the deportation of 8,000 "illegal" Jews to Treblinka, both ghetto inhabitants and observers on the "Aryan side" widely believed that Jewish fighters had compelled the Germans to withdraw and halt the deportations. This perception significantly enhanced the authority of the Jewish Combat Organization among the Jewish population. The January self-defense marked a profound psychological turning point, fostering the belief among ghetto residents that active and passive resistance were not only feasible but could genuinely improve chances of survival. Yitzhak Zuckerman later remarked that "the January uprising made the April uprising possible".

Reports of the Jewish underground's armed resistance – often considerably exaggerated – were met with widespread admiration in Polish society. The events received extensive coverage in the underground press, including the Home Army's official organ Biuletyn Informacyjny, the PPS–WRN paper WRN, the People's Party's Przez walkę do zwycięstwa, and the communist People's Guard publication Gwardzista. They were also noted in Dziennik Polski, published in the United Kingdom. As Dariusz Libionka has described it, the January self-defense effected a "radical change" in the Polish Underground State's attitude toward the Jewish Combat Organization. The Home Army commander-in-chief, General Stefan Rowecki, codenamed Grot – previously skeptical about arming Jews (Note: In a radiogram sent to London on 2 January 1943, Rowecki wrote: "The Jews, too late, from various small groups, including communists, are approaching us for weapons, as if we had full warehouses. As a test, I issued a few pistols; I have no certainty whether they will use this weapon at all. I will not give more weapons, because, as you know, we ourselves do not have it; we are waiting for deliveries" (Libionka (2006, p. 61); Gutman (1993, pp. 405–406)).) – authorized a further transfer of weapons and ammunition to the Jewish Combat Organization. At the end of January 1943, 50 pistols with ammunition, approximately 80 kg of materials for producing Molotov cocktails, and a quantity of grenades were smuggled into the ghetto. (Note: However, the matter was not without certain controversies. In a letter to the Home Army command dated 13 March 1943, Anielewicz reportedly informed that only 36 out of 49 delivered pistols were fit for use, and the amount of ammunition was completely insufficient (Engelking & Leociak (2013, p. 1489)). It is not certain, however, whether this letter – first published in 1953 by Bernard Mark (in the Polish People's Republic) and Adolf Berman (in Israel) – is authentic, and if it was indeed sent, whether it reached the addressees (Libionka (2006, p. 70)).) Evidence suggests this was the final direct arms delivery from the Home Army to the Jewish Combat Organization, though the Polish underground continued to assist Jewish fighters in acquiring weapons and ammunition on the "Aryan side".

Following the January action, the Jewish Combat Organization effectively assumed authority within the ghetto. The severely depleted Judenrat largely ceased substantive operations, confining itself to provisioning matters. Its chairman, Marek Lichtenbaum, acknowledged to German officials that he no longer exerted influence over the district. The Jewish Ghetto Police, reduced to only 82 members, lost all remaining significance. (Note: The commander of the Jewish Ghetto Police, Józef Szeryński, committed suicide three days after the conclusion of the January action. His previous deputy, Leon Piżyc, became the new commander (Engelking & Leociak (2013, p. 466)).) German forces entered the ghetto only sporadically thereafter, and typically only during daylight hours.

The Jewish Combat Organization, which Israel Gutman described as initially a "loose federation of factions and groups", evolved into a more unified organization. The authority of Anielewicz and the other leaders became unquestioned. At the same time, the command drew practical lessons from the January fighting. It was decided to avoid open street clashes in the future and to focus instead on defense from buildings and building complexes. Hidden passages were constructed between cellars and attics to allow fighters to move safely within the ghetto and to access the "Aryan side". All combatants were permanently quartered in abandoned apartments, preventing a recurrence of the January situation in which the partially dispersed Jewish Combat Organization had been caught by surprise. Some members received military training in courses organized by the Home Army and the Polish Socialist Party. Weapons and ammunition were manufactured and acquired through various means. Funds for purchases were raised via voluntary collections and expropriation actions. Both the Jewish Combat Organization and the Jewish Military Union continued efforts to eliminate collaborators and informants.

From the time of the January self-defense, the concept of resistance enjoyed broad support among ghetto inhabitants. Nevertheless, the majority of Jews – aware that the pause in deportations was temporary – prioritized finding ways to save themselves and their immediate families. Jacek Leociak estimates that approximately 4,500 ghetto residents escaped to the "Aryan side" following the January action. Gunnar S. Paulsson calculates that around 10,000 Jews fled the ghetto between Grossaktion Warsaw and the April uprising, with the largest number – approximately 7,500 – doing so between 18 January and 18 April 1943. Those who chose to remain intensified preparations by constructing bunkers and hiding places.

Meanwhile, German authorities proceeded with plans for the ghetto's liquidation and the relocation of workers and shop assets to the Lublin District. On 1 February 1943, following an agreement reached the previous day between SS-Brigadeführer Odilo Globocnik and Walther Többens, the SS assumed control of all ghetto establishments producing for Wehrmacht needs. A similar arrangement was made with Fritz Schultz, owner of the second-largest shop complex. On 16 February, Himmler instructed SS-Obergruppenführer Oswald Pohl, head of the SS Main Economic and Administrative Office, to convert the Warsaw Ghetto into a concentration camp with the status of a state enterprise (Reichsbetrieb), after which the camp – along with its facilities and prisoners – was to be transferred as rapidly as possible to the Lublin Land. On the same day, Himmler wrote to Friedrich-Wilhelm Krüger, ordering that, once the camp had been relocated, the emptied ghetto buildings – "previously occupied by 500,000 subhumans and never suitable for Germans" – be razed to the ground. The planned destruction, officially justified on security grounds, likely formed part of broader Nazi intentions to diminish Warsaw and reduce it to the status of a provincial city.

On 16 February 1943, the first transport of Jews departed the Warsaw Ghetto for the Trawniki concentration camp. A second transport, consisting of 850 individuals, followed on 23 February 1943 to the camp at Poniatowa. Walther Többens, now acting as "commissioner for evacuation", made vigorous efforts to persuade Jews to relocate voluntarily to the Lublin Land, assuring workers and their families of complete safety. He arranged for Jewish workers already in Trawniki and Poniatowa to visit the ghetto and testify that the facilities were genuine labor camps. The Jewish Combat Organization responded with an intensive counter-propaganda campaign, urging residents not to trust German promises. Resistance actions included arson attacks on warehouses and facilities slated for evacuation. When persuasion proved ineffective, the Werkschutz began conducting roundups, which prompted armed responses from Jewish Combat Organization fighters. The most significant street clash occurred around 13 March 1943, when Jewish combatants – at the cost of several of their own lives – freed a captured comrade and killed two Germans. In reprisal, SS personnel murdered between 100 and 210 residents of a nearby building. Ultimately, only a few thousand Warsaw Jews were transferred to the Lublin Land, either voluntarily or by force.

When German forces re-entered the ghetto on 19 April 1943 with the intent of forcibly evacuating all remaining inhabitants, the Jewish Combat Organization and Jewish Military Union initiated armed resistance. This sparked the full-scale uprising, which the occupiers suppressed only after nearly a month of fighting and the deployment of substantial forces.

== In culture ==
Władysław Szlengel dedicated his poem Kontratak (Counterattack) to the January self-defense of the ghetto. He also recounted his experiences during the January action – including the German "selection" in the brushmakers' shop – in the essay Co czytałem umarłym (What I Read to the Dead). The events profoundly influenced Szlengel's later work, which increasingly aimed to foster a spirit of resistance among ghetto residents.

The January action and its associated fighting were depicted in the 2001 film Uprising, directed by Jon Avnet.

== Bibliography ==
- Bartoszewski, Władysław (2008). 1859 dni Warszawy [1859 Days of Warsaw] (in Polish). Kraków: Znak. ISBN 978-83-240-1057-8.
- Ciesielska, Maria (2020). "Amelia Greenwald i Szkoła Pielęgniarstwa przy Szpitalu Starozakonnych na Czystem w Warszawie" [Amelia Greenwald and the Nursing School at the Jewish Hospital at Czyste in Warsaw]. Medycyna Nowożytna (in Polish). 26 (1): 93–139. doi:10.4467/12311960MN.20.005.12621.
- Ciesielska, Maria (2017). Lekarze getta warszawskiego [Doctors of the Warsaw Ghetto] (in Polish). Warsaw: Dwa Światy. ISBN 978-83-94869-11-3.
- Eisenbach, Artur (1961). Hitlerowska polityka zagłady Żydów [Nazi Policy of Jewish Extermination] (in Polish). Warsaw: Książka i Wiedza.
- Engelking, Barbara; Leociak, Jacek (2013). Getto warszawskie. Przewodnik po nieistniejącym mieście [Warsaw Ghetto. Guide to the Non-Existent City] (in Polish). Warsaw: Stowarzyszenie Centrum Badań nad Zagładą Żydów. ISBN 978-83-63444-28-0.
- Gutman, Israel (1998). Walka bez cienia nadziei. Powstanie w getcie warszawskim [Fight Without a Shadow of Hope. The Warsaw Ghetto Uprising] (in Polish). Warsaw: Rytm. ISBN 83-86678-86-0.
- Gutman, Israel (1993). Żydzi warszawscy 1939–1943. Getto, podziemie, walka [Warsaw Jews 1939–1943. Ghetto, Underground, Struggle] (in Polish). Warsaw: Rytm. ISBN 83-85249-26-5.
- Kassow, Samuel D. (2010). Kto napisze naszą historię? Ukryte archiwum Emanuela Ringelbluma [Who Will Write Our History? Emanuel Ringelblum's Hidden Archive] (in Polish). Warsaw: Amber. ISBN 978-83-241-3633-9.
- Lewin, Abraham (2016). Dziennik [Journal] (in Polish). Warsaw: Żydowski Instytut Historyczny im. Emanuela Ringelbluma. ISBN 978-83-65254-20-7.
- Libionka, Dariusz (2017). Zagłada Żydów w Generalnym Gubernatorstwie. Zarys problematyki [The Extermination of Jews in the General Government. Outline of the Problem] (in Polish). Lublin: Państwowe Muzeum na Majdanku. ISBN 978-83-62816-34-7.
- Libionka, Dariusz (2006). "ZWZ-AK i Delegatura Rządu RP wobec eksterminacji Żydów polskich" [ZWZ-AK and the Delegacy of the Polish Government Towards the Extermination of Polish Jews]. In Żbikowski, Andrzej (ed.). Polacy i Żydzi pod okupacją niemiecką 1939–1945. Studia i materiały [Poles and Jews Under German Occupation 1939–1945. Studies and Materials] (in Polish). Warsaw: Instytut Pamięci Narodowej. ISBN 83-60464-01-4.
- Paulsson, Gunnar S. (2009). Utajone miasto. Żydzi po aryjskiej stronie Warszawy (1940–1945) [Secret City. Jews on the Aryan Side of Warsaw (1940–1945)] (in Polish). Kraków: Znak. ISBN 978-83-240-1252-7.
- Person, Katarzyna (2018). Policjanci. Wizerunek Żydowskiej Służby Porządkowej w getcie warszawskim [Policemen. The Image of the Jewish Ghetto Police in the Warsaw Ghetto] (in Polish). Warsaw: Żydowski Instytut Historyczny im. Emanuela Ringelbluma. ISBN 978-83-65254-78-8.
- Ringelblum, Emanuel (1983). Kronika getta warszawskiego [Chronicle of the Warsaw Ghetto] (in Polish). Warsaw: Czytelnik. ISBN 83-07-00879-4.
- Ringelblum, Emanuel (1988). Stosunki polsko-żydowskie w czasie drugiej wojny światowej: uwagi i spostrzeżenia [Polish-Jewish Relations During World War II: Notes and Observations] (in Polish). Warsaw: Czytelnik. ISBN 83-07-01686-X.
- Sakowska, Ruta (1975). Ludzie z dzielnicy zamkniętej. Żydzi w Warszawie w okresie hitlerowskiej okupacji: październik 1939 – marzec 1943 [People from the Closed District. Jews in Warsaw During the Nazi Occupation: October 1939 – March 1943] (in Polish). Warsaw: Państwowe Wydawnictwo Naukowe.
