= Marek Lichtenbaum =

Polish Jewish construction engineer

Marek Lichtenbaum (28 November 1876 – 23 April 1943) was a Polish construction engineer of Jewish origin who was the last chairman of the Jewish Council (Judenrat) in the Warsaw Ghetto during World War II.

== Before World War II ==
Marek Lichtenbaum was born on November 28, 1876, in Warsaw. Before World War II, he worked as a construction engineer.

He was actively involved in the life of the Warsaw Jewish community. In January 1937, when the Sanation authoritarian government decided to dissolve the authorities of the Jewish Religious Community of Warsaw, he was one of nine respected social activists invited to join the “Temporary Adjunct Council” under the commissioner president of the community, Maurycy Mayzel.

As part of his duties related to serving on the commissioner authorities, he was, among other responsibilities, a member of the commission examining the community's budget situation. In addition, he served as chairman of the economic department and deputy chairman of the cemetery department.

== Siege of Warsaw ==
When Nazi Germany invaded Poland on September 1, 1939, Lichtenbaum remained in Warsaw. On September 6, president Maurycy Mayzel left the city, plunging the Jewish Religious Community into chaos. In these circumstances, on September 20, the commissioner of civil defense for Warsaw and the city’s mayor, Stefan Starzyński, instructed the Jewish Religious Community councilors to perform the duties of a temporary president. At the same time, he appointed Adam Czerniaków as the "chairman of the meeting" and Lichtenbaum as his deputy.

Lichtenbaum was also considered one of two candidates for the position of commissioned president of the community. Ultimately, however, on September 23, Mayor Starzyński decided to entrust this position to Czerniaków while appointing Lichtenbaum as his deputy.

During the siege of Warsaw, Lichtenbaum participated in organizing the Jewish Civic Committee and later became a member of its five-person executive board. On September 13, during Rosh Hashanah, the northern district of Warsaw, heavily inhabited by Jews, suffered a particularly devastating Luftwaffe air raid. Lichtenbaum, along with Czerniaków, actively participated in efforts to clear the destruction and provide assistance to the victims.

== Judenrat and the Warsaw Ghetto ==
In early October 1939, shortly after the Wehrmacht entered Warsaw, the Einsatzgruppe IV command requested the establishment of a 24-person Jewish Council (Judenrat), with Adam Czerniaków appointed as chairman. Lichtenbaum was among its first members and served as deputy chairman.

In April 1940, when the German authorities ordered the construction of walls around the area that would become the Warsaw Ghetto, Lichtenbaum supervised their construction on behalf of the Judenrat. He later oversaw multiple reconstructions of the walls due to frequent changes in the ghetto's borders. Additionally, he was a member of the hospital commission operating within the Judenrat's health department. (Note: According to Marta Janczewska, Lichtenbaum also served as the chairman of the Judenrat's economic department (see: Janczewska (2014), p. 730.). Other sources, however, attribute this role to Izrael First (see: Engelking and Leociak (2013), p. 1607.).) He often accompanied Czerniaków to meetings with German officials.

Lichtenbaum's reputation in the Warsaw Ghetto was poor. He was described as a "wretched creature, a troublemaker, and a boor." Despite this, Czerniaków valued Lichtenbaum for his organizational skills and toughness, which enabled him to discipline Judenrat officials and employees of ghetto enterprises—tasks for which Czerniaków, known for his gentler demeanor, was less suited. (Note: However, Czerniaków's personal secretary, Leon Tyszka, claimed that the chairman of the Judenrat did not fully trust his deputy. See: Urynowicz (2009), p. 257.)

Lichtenbaum's two sons also had a bad reputation. They were considered "spoiled brats" and machers who, along with their father, were accused of profiting at the expense of the Judenrat. Nonetheless, Czerniaków appreciated their loyalty. One of the young Lichtenbaums even served as an intermediary in Czerniaków's dealings with Nazi officials.

In February 1940, Lichtenbaum and Czerniaków were stopped on the street by German policemen who intended to take them to perform forced labour. During the incident, Lichtenbaum was beaten with a whip. Later, between April 6 and 10, 1941, he and Czerniaków were briefly arrested and beaten again. To further humiliate him, the Germans shaved off Lichtenbaum's mustache. According to some accounts, this experience made Lichtenbaum more submissive to the occupiers.

On July 23, 1942, the second day of the Grossaktion Warsaw, Czerniaków committed suicide, refusing to cooperate with the Nazis in deporting Jews to the Treblinka extermination camp. Following his death, the Germans appointed Lichtenbaum as the new chairman of the Judenrat. During the Grossaktion, Lichtenbaum demonstrated complete submissiveness to the Nazis. In August 1942, he also became chairman of the presidium department of the Judenrat.

After the Grossaktion, Lichtenbaum remained chairman of the Judenrat. In the autumn of 1942, he moved to 40 Muranowska Street. However, his position became largely symbolic, as the Jewish Council was stripped of significant powers. Despite this, the Nazis sought to maintain an appearance of normality in the ghetto. To this end, in late October or early November 1942, Lichtenbaum—marking a first in the history of the Warsaw Judenrat—was summoned to a meeting with the SS and Police Leader in the Warsaw District, SS-Oberführer Ferdinand von Sammern-Frankenegg.

After the so-called January Action in 1943, the Judenrat's activities effectively ceased. From that point forward, the council was almost entirely confined to managing food supplies. In discussions with the Germans, Lichtenbaum admitted that he no longer had control over the situation in the ghetto, as the Jewish Combat Organization (Żydowska Organizacja Bojowa, ŻOB) had assumed real authority. The ŻOB forced Lichtenbaum to allocate 250,000 złoty from the Judenrat's treasury to purchase weapons, threatening to kill his son if he refused.

On April 19, 1943, the Nazis began the final liquidation of the Warsaw Ghetto. The Jewish resistance responded with an armed uprising. When German forces entered the ghetto, Lichtenbaum and several other Judenrat members were held hostage in the so-called Befehlstelle at 103 Żelazna Street. Four days later, they were taken to the Umschlagplatz, where they were executed. Their bodies were discarded in the garbage.

== Bibliography ==
- Engelking, Barbara; Leociak, Jacek (2013). Getto warszawskie. Przewodnik po nieistniejącym mieście [e-book] [The Warsaw Ghetto: A Guide to the Perished City [e-book]] (in Polish). Warszawa: Stowarzyszenie Centrum Badań nad Zagładą Żydów. ISBN 978-83-63444-28-0.
- Fuks, Marian, ed. (1983). Adama Czerniakowa dziennik getta warszawskiego. 6 IX 1939 – 23 VII 1942 [Adam Czerniaków's diary of the Warsaw Ghetto. 6 IX 1939 – 23 VII 1942] (in Polish). Warszawa: Państwowe Wydawnictwo Naukowe. ISBN 83-01-03042-9.
- Gutman, Israel (1993). Żydzi warszawscy 1939–1943. Getto, podziemie, walka [The Jews of Warsaw, 1939-1943: Ghetto, Underground, Revolt] (in Polish). Warszawa: Oficyna Wydawnicza "Rytm". ISBN 83-85249-26-5.
- Janczewska, Marta (2014). Archiwum Ringelbluma. Konspiracyjne Archiwum Getta Warszawy. Tom 12: Rada Żydowska w Warszawie (1939–1943) [Ringelblum Archive. The Underground Archive of the Warsaw Ghetto. Volume 12: The Jewish Council in Warsaw (1939–1943)] (in Polish). Warszawa: Żydowski Instytut Historyczny im. Emanuela Ringelbluma. ISBN 978-83-61850-44-1.
- Libionka, Dariusz (2017). Zagłada Żydów w Generalnym Gubernatorstwie. Zarys problematyki [The Extermination of Jews in the General Government] (in Polish). Lublin: Państwowe Muzeum na Majdanku. ISBN 978-83-62816-34-7.
- Urynowicz, Marcin (2009). Adam Czerniaków 1880–1942. Prezes Getta Warszawskiego [Adam Czerniaków 1880–1942. Chairman of the Warsaw Ghetto] (in Polish). Wołowiec: Instytut Pamięci Narodowej – Komisja Ścigania Zbrodni przeciwko Narodowi Polskiemu. ISBN 978-83-7629-050-8.
