= Befehlstelle =

Coordinates: 52.24160583°N 20.985340665°E

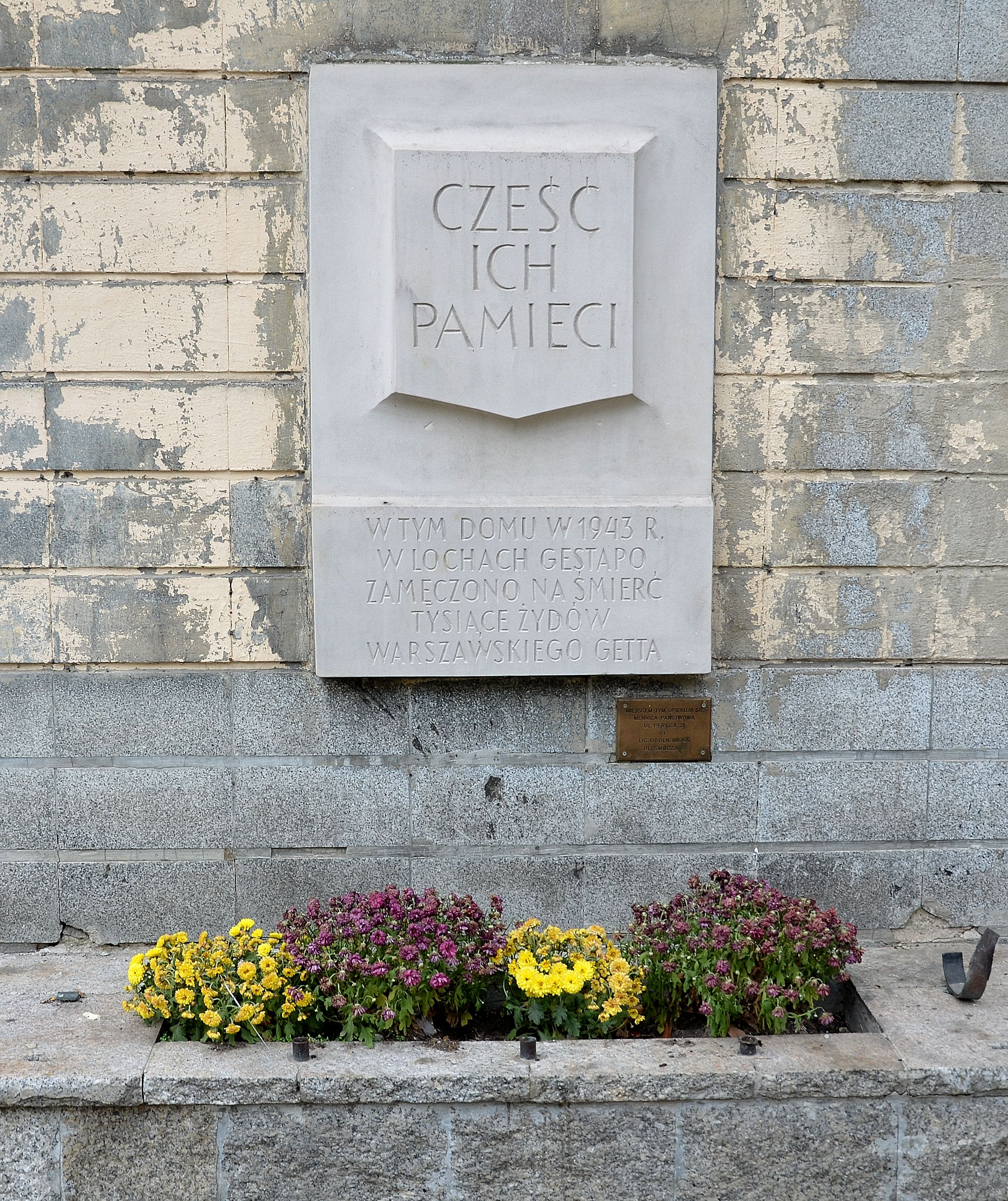
Tchorek plaque on the front wall of the tenement at 103 Żelazna Street in Warsaw, commemorating the victims of Befehlstelle

Befehlstelle (lit. 'Command Post') was a Nazi German headquarters and detention center located within the Warsaw Ghetto, in a tenement house at 103 Żelazna Street. It operated between 1942 and 1943.

== During the Grossaktion Warsaw ==
In the late 1930s, at the far end of Żelazna Street (north of Żytnia Street), on a plot of land belonging to the Serkowski family of manufacturers, three tenement houses were built, numbered 99, 101, and 103. They were four stories high and designed in the modernist style. During the siege of Warsaw in September 1939, tenement house no. 99 was hit by a German bomb, while the others survived without major damage. In December 1941, this section of Żelazna Street was incorporated into the Warsaw Ghetto. The tenement houses on Żelazna Street were considered among the most beautiful and modern buildings in the ghetto.

On July 22, 1942, the Nazis began the Grossaktion Warsaw, the mass deportation of Jews from the Warsaw Ghetto. That day, SS officers from the Operation Reinhardt headquarters, led by SS-Hauptsturmführer Hermann Höfle, took over 103 Żelazna Street. They had arrived from Lublin a week earlier to oversee the "resettlement" of Warsaw’s Jews. The residents of the tenement house were given 15 minutes to vacate the building. As the chairman of the Judenrat, Adam Czerniaków, noted in his diary that day:

The order was to empty the house at Żelazna 103 for the needs of the German officers carrying out the resettlement. The furniture was seized.

The tenement house at Żelazna 103 soon became known in the ghetto as the Befehlstelle ('command post'). From this building, Höfle and his subordinates directed the deportations of Warsaw’s Jews to the Treblinka extermination camp. The tenement house also served as their temporary accommodation. After hours of "work," the SS organized drinking parties there.

A number of Jews were employed as auxiliary workers at the Befehlstelle. The authors of the monograph The Warsaw Ghetto: A Guide to the Perished City noted that this group consisted of a dozen or so people. Among them were several officers of the Jewish Ghetto Police (Czaplińscy, Mayzler, Moszkowicz, Manel (Note: Manel, a talented graphic artist, created maps of the ghetto for the Germans during the Grossaktion. After the deportations ended, he remained at the Befehlstelle, where he continued his work by drawing portraits of SS officers. See: Engelking & Leociak (2013), pp. 460, 1079.)); Kornheim, a stenographer; Leon Kac, a barber; Ajzyk, a shoe shiner; Lindersztern, a maintenance worker and driver; Erna, a housekeeper; Irka and Lindenszernowa, kitchen workers; Gołębikierowna, a housemaid; as well as a dozen or so rickshaw drivers. In contrast, one Jewish Ghetto Police officer stated in his post-war memoirs that the number of Jewish workers reached 40–50, and if their families were included, around 100 people. They lived in neighboring tenement houses, no. 99 and 101.

For some time, Jewish employees of the Befehlstelle were protected from deportation. However, on the day the "Lublin resettlement staff" left Warsaw, most of them were either executed on-site or deported to Treblinka.

== During the Period of the "Residual Ghetto" ==
On September 12, 1942, as the Grossaktion Warsaw was coming to an end, Höfle and his subordinates left Warsaw. At that time, members of the so-called Warsaw deportation staff, who had been quartered in the offices of the Jewish Ghetto Police at 17 Ogrodowa Street, relocated to the tenement house at 103 Żelazna Street. Their commander was SS-Untersturmführer Karl Georg Brandt, a specialist in Jewish affairs in the Warsaw Gestapo. Nine days later, the last transport to Treblinka departed from the Umschlagplatz, marking the completion of the deportation operation.

After the Grossaktion, approximately 60,000 Jews remained in the Warsaw Ghetto, either legally or illegally. From then on, the ghetto became the so-called "residual ghetto" (German: Restgetto )—one of six in the Warsaw District where Jews were legally permitted to reside. The Judenrat, the Jewish Ghetto Police, and the civilian office of the German commissioner for the Jewish district lost all significance. Authority in the ghetto was now fully exercised by the Sonderkommando der Sicherheitspolizei-Umsiedlung, commanded by Brandt and headquartered at 103 Żelazna Street.

The Befehlstelle was equipped with, among other things, office rooms for Brandt and other SS officers, a guardhouse for Polish youths from the Baudienst, a guardhouse for German gendarmes (added in January 1943), a kitchen, and two separate dining rooms—one for Germans and another for employees. There were also three guest rooms, including one designated for SS men from the Treblinka extermination camp who visited Warsaw.

The Befehlstelle served not only as a command post but also as a temporary prison. Jews arrested on various charges were imprisoned in its basements, primarily those caught attempting to escape to the "Aryan side." Poles who were found illegally staying in the ghetto were also sent there—most of them were looters who robbed apartments abandoned after the Grossaktion. The basements of tenement house no. 103 quickly became overcrowded, leading to the expansion of the jail into one of the basements of tenement house no. 101. This additional cell was known as the "dark cell" (Polish: Ciemnica), where SS officers detained prisoners who faced severe punishment or from whom they sought to extract critical information.

Prisoners underwent interrogations combined with torture. Some were eventually released, while others were subjected to flogging or deported to labor camps. An unknown number were executed. Summary executions, typically gunshots to the back of the head, were carried out either in the yard of tenement house no. 101 or, according to some sources, in the yard of tenement house no. 103. The bodies of both Jewish and Polish victims were buried in the Jewish cemetery on Okopowa Street.

Jewish helpers continued to be employed at the Befehlstelle, though their numbers were much lower than during the Grossaktion. Moreover, only some of them permanently resided on Żelazna Street. The Jewish Ghetto Police guarded the prison. Its warden was Moses Meisler, a Jewish Ghetto Police officer. Another officer, Marceli Czapliński, acted as the official liaison with Jewish institutions within the ghetto.

== During the Warsaw Ghetto Uprising and the Warsaw Uprising ==
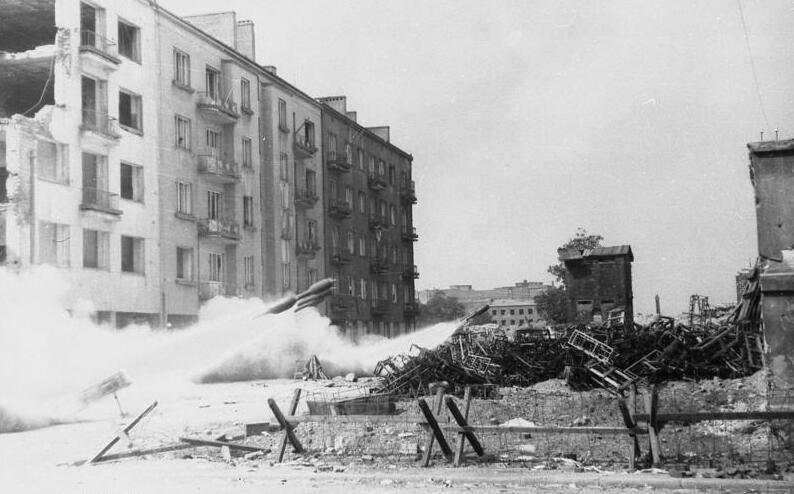
Warsaw Uprising of 1944. German Nebelwerfer shelling the Polish positions. In the background, third from the left, the tenement at 103 Żelazna Street

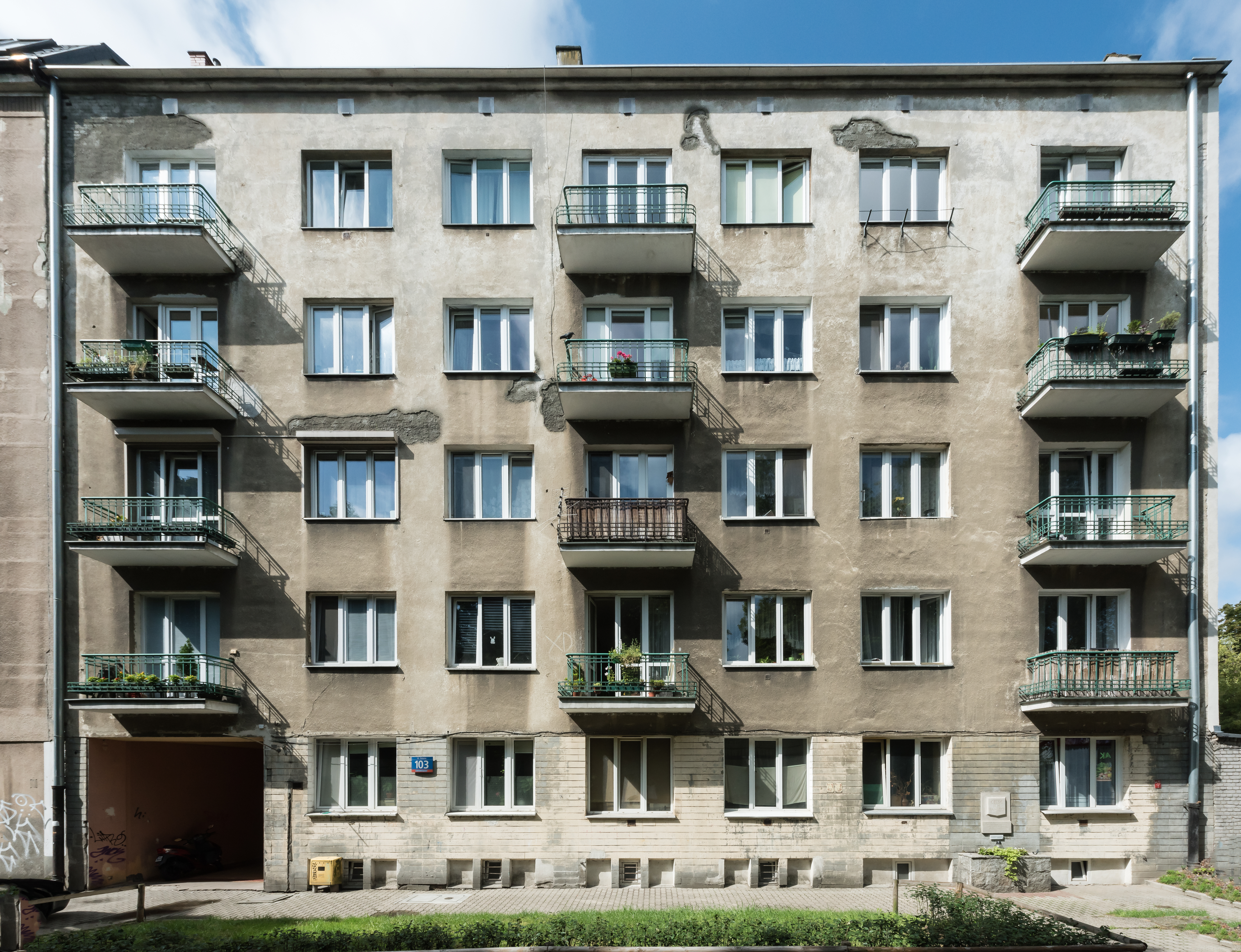
Tenement in 2023

On April 19, 1943, the day the Warsaw Ghetto Uprising broke out, the Germans imprisoned Chairman Marek Lichtenbaum and the remaining members of the Judenrat in the Befehlstelle. Four days later, they were taken to the Umschlagplatz, where they were executed.

On the same day that the councilors were murdered, a group of fighters from the Jewish Military Union (Żydowski Związek Wojskowy, ŻZW), led by Natan Szulc, attacked the Befehlstelle in an attempt to free the prisoners held there. The attack was unsuccessful, and most of the fighters were killed in combat.

The Jews working in the Befehlstelle were executed by the Germans in late April 1943. In July of that year, after the uprising had been suppressed, the SS commando abandoned Żelazna Street.

During the Warsaw Uprising of 1944, the tenement at 103 Żelazna Street—along with the nearby St. Sophia Hospital, the Pawiak prison, and the Warsaw concentration camp—became one of the main points of German resistance in the ghetto ruins. On August 4, 1944, soldiers of the Kedyw battalions of the Home Army— "Zośka" and "Miotła"—and the X Group of the "Śródmieście" sub-district of the Home Army attempted to capture German positions in the Żelazna Street area. However, the poorly coordinated attack ended in failure. During the battle, tenement house no. 103 was shelled by a Panther tank captured by the insurgents.

== Commemoration ==
The tenement house at 103 Żelazna Street survived the war. After its conclusion, it once again served as a residential building.

In the 1950s, a plaque designed by Karol Tchorek was installed on the front wall of the tenement house. However, the inscription on it is somewhat imprecise:

Honour to their memory. In this house, in 1943, thousands of Jews from the Warsaw Ghetto were tortured to death in the Gestapo dungeons.

== Bibliography ==
- Borkiewicz, Adam (2018). Powstanie warszawskie. Zarys działań natury wojskowej [The Warsaw Uprising: An Outline of Military Operations] (in Polish). Warszawa: Muzeum Powstania Warszawskiego. ISBN 978-83-64308-20-8.
- Ciepłowski, Stanisław (1987). Napisy pamiątkowe w Warszawie XVIII–XX w [Commemorative inscriptions in Warsaw: 18th–20th centuries] (in Polish). Warszawa: Państwowe Wydawnictwo Naukowe. ISBN 83-01-06109-X.
- Engelking, Barbara; Leociak, Jacek (2013). Getto warszawskie. Przewodnik po nieistniejącym mieście [e-book] [The Warsaw Ghetto: A Guide to the Perished City [e-book]] (in Polish). Warszawa: Stowarzyszenie Centrum Badań nad Zagładą Żydów. ISBN 978-83-63444-28-0.
- Fuks, Marian, ed. (1983). Adama Czerniakowa dziennik getta warszawskiego. 6 IX 1939 – 23 VII 1942 [Adam Czerniaków's diary of the Warsaw Ghetto. 6 IX 1939 – 23 VII 1942] (in Polish). Warszawa: Państwowe Wydawnictwo Naukowe. ISBN 83-01-03042-9.
- Leociak, Jacek; Waślicka-Żmijewska, Zofia; Żmijewski, Artur (2020). Warszawski trójkąt Zagłady [Warsaw's Holocaust Triangle] (in Polish). Warszawa: Wydawnictwo Krytyki Politycznej. ISBN 978-83-66586-62-8.
