= Arpad Wigand =

SS-Oberführer and war criminal (1906–1983)

- Born: 13 January 1906; Mannheim, Grand Duchy of Baden, German Empire
- Died: 26 July 1983 (aged 77); Mannheim, West Germany
- Military career
- Allegiance: Nazi Germany
- Branch: Allgemeine-SS; Waffen-SS
- Service years: 1930–1945
- Rank: SS-Oberführer
- Unit: Reich Security Main Office
- Commands: Inspekteur der Sicherheitspolizei und des SD, Breslau; SS and Police Leader, Warsaw
- Conflicts: World War II
- Awards: Iron Cross, 1st and 2nd class War Merit Cross, 2nd class

Arpad Jakob Valentin Wigand (13 January 1906 – 26 July 1983) was a German Nazi officer with the rank of SS-Oberführer who served as the SS and Police Leader (SSPF) in Warsaw from 4 August 1941 until 23 April 1943 during the occupation of Poland in World War II. He was convicted of war crimes and sentenced to prison.

== Early life ==
Wigand was born the son of a railwayman in Mannheim. After completing secondary school, he began an apprenticeship with the Deutsche Reichsbahn in 1922. However, after completing his training, he was not hired due to austerity measures at the railway. From 1925 onward, he earned his living as a commercial clerk in Düsseldorf. He lost this job in 1931 as a result of the Great Depression.

== Peacetime SS career ==
Wigand became a member of the Nazi Party in 1926 (membership number 30,682) and of the Schutzstaffel (SS number 2,999) in 1930. As an early Party member, he would later be awarded the Golden Party Badge. From 1931, he served in several SS-Standarte as an adjutant and staff officer. He commanded the 70th SS-Standarte from September 1935 to the beginning of July 1936 and then the 16th SS-Standarte. He was posted to the SD-Hauptamt under Reinhard Heydrich in 1937 and became the SD commander in SD-Oberabschnitt (main district) "Ost" in Berlin. From 1 September 1937, to July 1941, he was the Inspekteur der Sicherheitspolizei und des SD for Wehrkreis (military district) VIII, headquartered in Breslau (today, Wrocław), Silesia. While in this post, he attained his last promotion in the Allgemeine-SS to SS-Oberführer on 20 April 1938.

== SS and police leader in Poland and Waffen-SS service ==
Following the start of the Second World War, as an aide to Erich von dem Bach Zelewski, Wigand first suggested the site in Upper Silesia of the former Austrian and later Polish artillery barracks in the Zasole suburb of Oswiecim for a concentration camp in January 1940. This site would evolve into the Auschwitz concentration camp which went on to become a major site of the Nazi "Final Solution to the Jewish question" resulting in the death of up to 1,000,000 Jews.

On 4 August 1941, Wigand was appointed SS and Police Leader (SSPF) in Warsaw. In mid-October 1941, at a meeting in Warsaw, he expressed the opinion that the Jews in the Warsaw Ghetto were incapable of resistance due to their poor nutritional status. Wigand was entrusted by Heinrich Himmler on 17 April 1942, with the construction of the Treblinka extermination camp.

In July 1942, Wigand transferred to the Waffen-SS and his duties as SSPF in Warsaw were assumed by Ferdinand von Sammern-Frankenegg in an acting capacity, until he was formally replaced as SSPF by Jürgen Stroop on 23 April 1943. In the Waffen-SS, Wigand served as a platoon leader with the 7th SS Volunteer Mountain Division Prinz Eugen from September 1942, then as an adjutant with the same division from spring 1943, and finally as commander of the 3rd battalion of the 13th Waffen Mountain Division of the SS Handschar (1st Croatian) until February 1945. During his war service, Wigand was awarded the Iron Cross, 1st and 2nd class and the War Merit Cross, 2nd class.

== Trial and conviction ==
After the war, Wigand was taken into British captivity and was later extradited to Poland. In 1950, Wigand was sentenced by the District Court in Warsaw for crimes against humanity to 10 years imprisonment, which was later increased to 15 years. At the time, Polish officials were unaware of Wigand's extensive participation in the Holocaust, and instead prosecuted him for his high-ranking position and SS membership. Wigand was released from prison in 1956 and deported to West Germany. In 1961, he was arrested by the West German judiciary and charged with participating in the murder of at least 2,300 Jews in Warsaw, but the charges were later dropped.

In 1971, Wigand reappeared in court to face new charges. In 1975, the investigation against him was resumed. In March 1981, Wigand and two others stood trial as war criminals. In October 1981, Wigand was convicted of ordering police to shoot Jews found outside of the Warsaw Ghetto in which they were forced to live. The court said it could not ascertain the exact number of Jews killed because of his order, but at least 100 died between August 1941 and the spring of 1942 when he was SSPF. Wigand was sentenced to 12 years and 6 months in prison. The court rejected the defense's contention that the order was designed to halt the spread of typhus by preventing carriers from leaving the ghetto. It called that defense "monstrous".

== SS Ranks ==
SS and Waffen-SS Ranks
Date	Rank
17 August 1931	SS-Sturmführer
9 November 1932	SS-Sturmhauptführer
11 June 1933	SS-Sturmbannführer
14 May 1934	SS-Obersturmbannführer
15 September 1935	SS-Standartenführer
1 April 1938	Untersturmführer der Waffen-SS
20 April 1938	SS-Oberführer
24 February 1943	Obersturmführer der Waffen-SS
30 January 1944	Hauptsturmführer der Waffen-SS
