= Gustawa Jarecka =

Polish writer

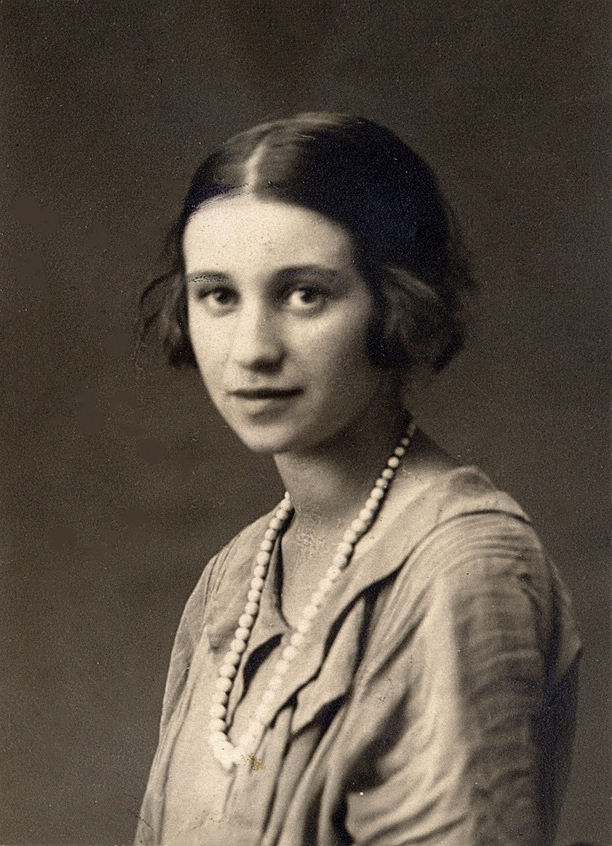
- Born: 23 December 1908; Kalisz
- Died: 22/23 January 1943 (aged 34); Warsaw
- Occupations: Novelist, teacher

Gustawa Jarecka (23 December 1908 – 22/23 January 1943) was a Polish novelist.

== Biography ==
She was a daughter of Moszek Jarecki and Natalia Jarecka.

She attended a school in Łódź. From 1925 to 1931 she studied Polonistics at the University of Warsaw and received her diploma. In 1932 her first novel, Inni ludzie, was published. Her novellas were published in Głos Poranny, Dziennik Ludowy, Górnik, Myśl Socjalistyczna and Nowa Kwadrydza. Themes of unemployment and its effects were often present in her works. She worked in school as a Polish language teacher in Wąbrzeźno.

After the war started (1939) she was living in Warsaw Ghetto, where, from 1940, she worked for the Judenrat as a telephonist and typist in the Jewish District. The people she worked with included the writer Marcel Reich-Ranicki who wrote about Jarecka in his 1999 book. She was a member of underground organization Oneg Shabbat, and was asked to write about what she was seeing by Emanuel Ringelblum. On account of her children she refused to come to the, so called, aryan part of the ghetto. She died on 22 or 23 January 1943. She is thought to have died with her children on the train to the Treblinka extermination camp.

She is attributed with writing the report describing the Grossaktion Warsaw titled Ostatnim etapem przesiedlenia jest śmierć (The last stage of resettlement is death).

== Novels ==
- Inni ludzie (Other people, 1931)
- Stare grzechy (Old sins, 1934)
- Przed jutrem (Before tomorrow, 1936)
- Ludzie i sztandary (People and banners) Reviewed
  - vol. 1 Ojcowie (Fathers, 1938)
  - vol. 2 Zwycięskie pokolenie (The victorious generation, 1939)
