= Yitzhak Gitterman =

Yitzhak Gitterman (1889–1943) was a director of the American Jewish Joint Distribution Committee (JDC) in Poland, and a member of the underground Jewish Combat Organization.

Gitterman was born in Hornostaipil, Ukraine, Russian Empire and began a career of supporting refugees and other victims of persecution during World War I. In 1921, he was appointed director of the JDC in Poland. He took part in the rehabilitation of the Jewish population and the establishment of welfare institutions.

With the German invasion of Poland in 1939, Gitterman left Warsaw for Vilna, where he rapidly set up operations to aid the refugee community. In December 1939, Gitterman left Lithuania for Sweden to appeal for outside help for Jews in occupied Poland. The Germans stopped his ship in the Baltic Sea and arrested all Polish nationals of military age. Gitterman was interned in a prisoner-of-war camp and returned to Warsaw in April 1940.

Gitterman continued his activities in support of Jewish self-help in Warsaw even after funding from the JDC ceased. He was actively involved in operations of the ghetto underground, including clandestine efforts to document the ghetto experience (code-named Oneg Shabbat). As reports reached the ghetto of the mass murder of Jews in Poland, Gitterman helped raise funds to purchase weapons for the Jewish Fighting Organization in the Warsaw Ghetto.

Yitzhak Gitterman was killed on January 18, 1943, while taking part in the resistance during the first day of the second major wave of deportations from the Warsaw Ghetto.

== Notes ==
This article incorporates text from the United States Holocaust Memorial Museum, and has been released under the GFDL.
