= Adam Czerniaków =

Polish politician (1880–1942)

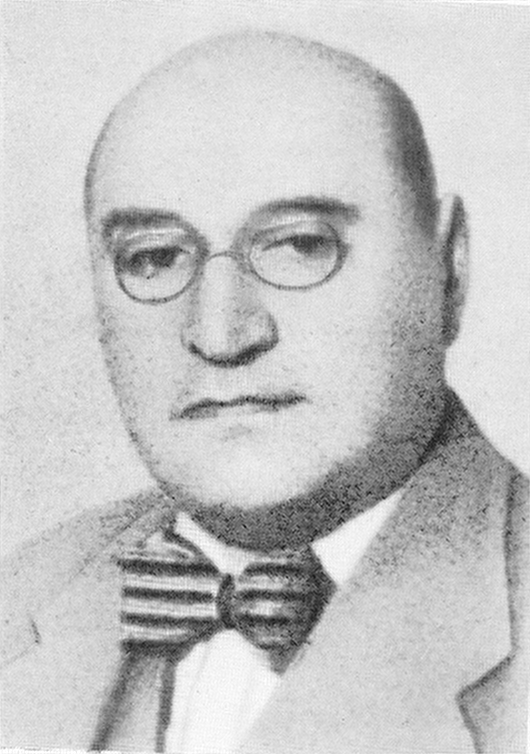
- Adam Czerniaków (before 1939)
- Born: 30 November 1880; Warsaw, Poland
- Died: 23 July 1942 (aged 61); Warsaw Ghetto, General Government
- Cause of death: Suicide by cyanide poisoning
- Occupations: Engineer, politician

Adam Czerniaków (30 November 1880 – 23 July 1942) was a Polish engineer and senator who was head of the Warsaw Ghetto Jewish Council (Judenrat) during World War II. He committed suicide on 23 July 1942 by swallowing a cyanide pill, a day after the commencement of mass extermination of Jews known as the Grossaktion Warsaw.

== Life and career ==
Czerniaków was born on 30 November 1880 in Warsaw, Poland (then part of the Congress Poland). He studied engineering in Warsaw and Dresden and taught in the Jewish community's vocational school in Warsaw. From 1927 to 1934 he served as member of the Warsaw Municipal Council, and in May 1930 was elected to the Polish Senate. On 4 October 1939, a few days after Warsaw surrendered to Nazi Germany, Czerniaków was made head of the 24 member Jewish Council (Judenrat), responsible for implementing German orders in the new Jewish ghetto. The Warsaw Ghetto was closed to the outside world on November 15, 1940.

=== The Warsaw Ghetto deportations ===
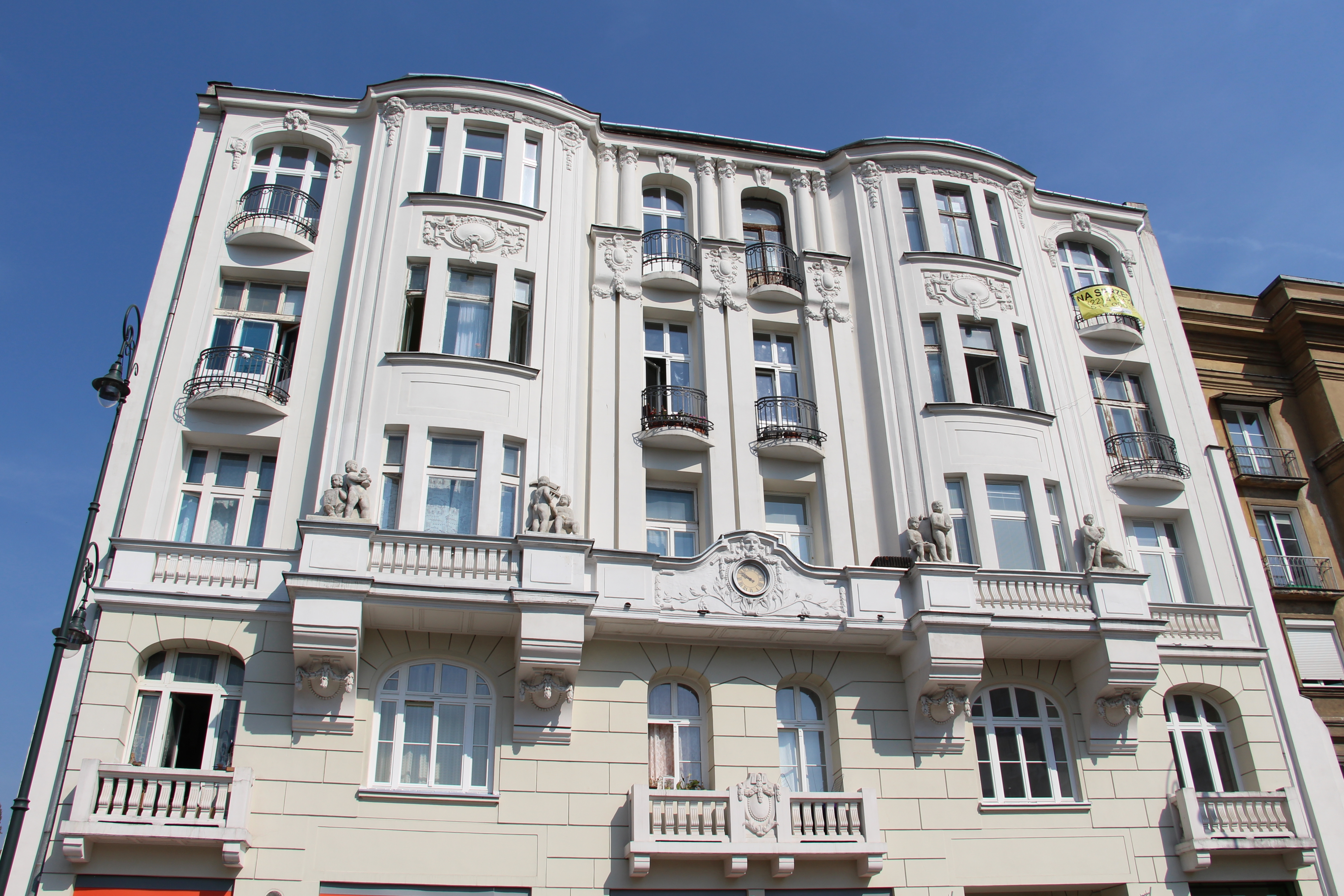
Tenement house at 20 Chłodna Street in Warsaw, home to Adam Czerników from 13 December 1941 till his death.

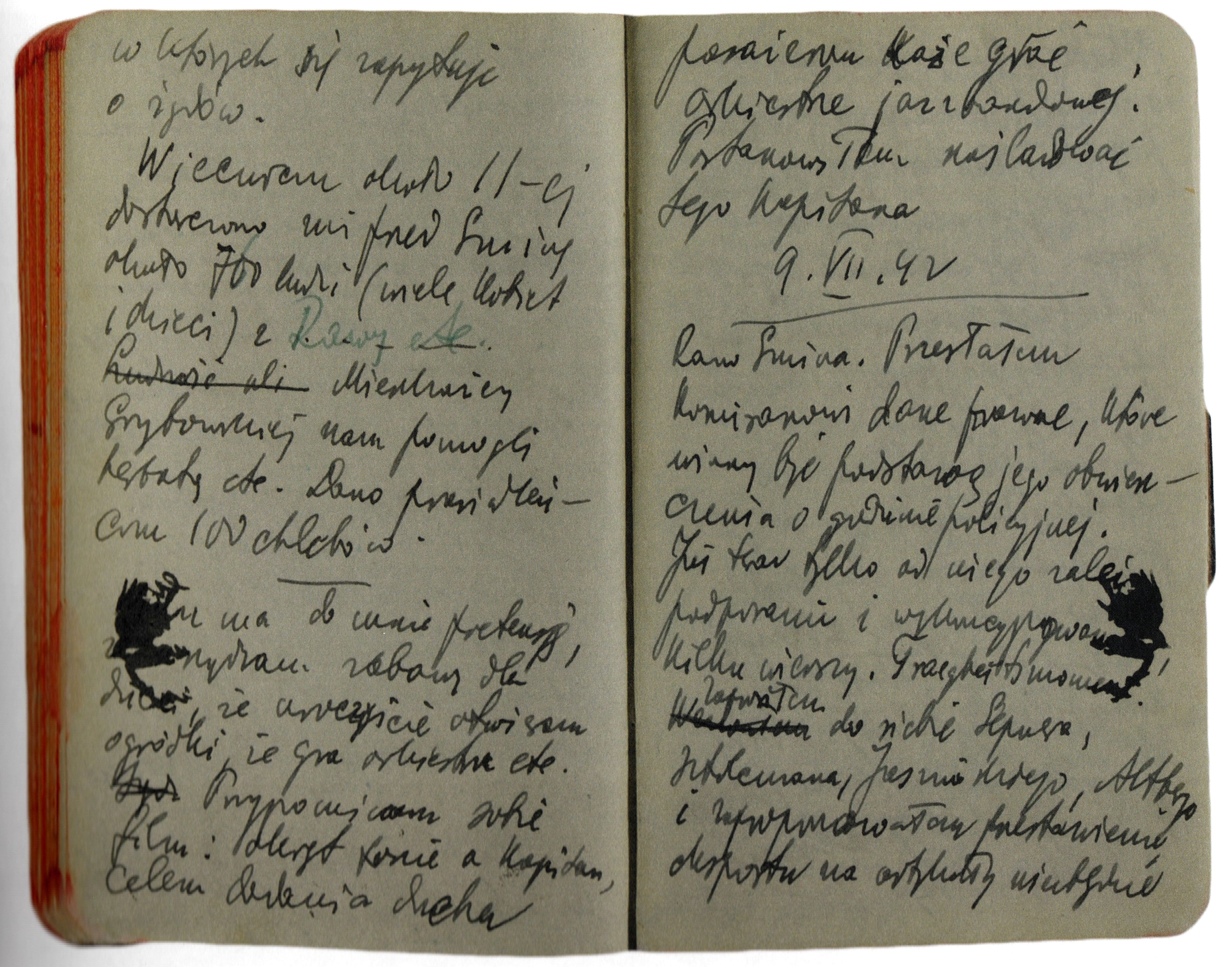
Czerniaków's diary

As the German authorities began preparing for mass deportations of Jews from the Warsaw Ghetto to the newly built Treblinka extermination camp in July 1942, the Jewish Council was ordered to provide lists of Jews and maps of their residences. On 22 July 1942, the Judenrat received instructions from the SS that all Warsaw Jews were to be "resettled" to the East. Exceptions were made for Jews working in Nazi German factories, Jewish hospital staff, members of the council and the Jewish Ghetto Police with their families. Over the course of the day Czerniaków obtained exemptions for a handful of individuals, including sanitation workers, husbands of women working in factories, and some vocational students. Despite pleading he was unable to obtain an exemption for the children in Janusz Korczak's orphanage or other ghetto orphanages. The orders stated that deportations would begin immediately at the rate of 6,000 people per day, to be supplied by the Jewish Council and the Ghetto Police. Failure would result in the execution of 100 hostages, including council employees and Czerniaków's wife.

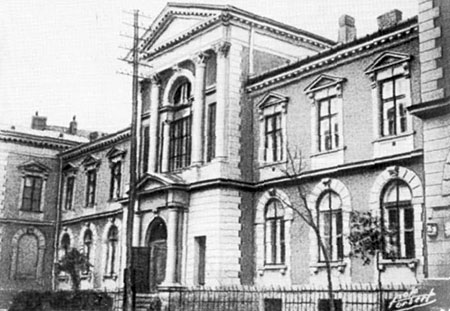
Jewish council building at 26/28 Grzybowska Street, Warsaw where Czerniaków committed suicide on 23 July 1942

Realizing that deportation meant death, Czerniaków went to plead for the orphans. When he failed, he returned to his office at 26/28 Grzybowska Street and killed himself by taking a cyanide capsule. He left a suicide note to his wife, reading “They demand me to kill children of my nation with my own hands. I have nothing to do but to die,” and one to his fellow members of the council, explaining: "I can no longer bear all this. My act will prove to everyone what is the right thing to do." He was succeeded by his deputy Marek Lichtenbaum.

=== Diary of Adam Czerniaków ===
Czerniaków kept a diary from 6 September 1939 until the day of his death. It was published in 1979 and has been translated into English. His wife Felicja survived the war and preserved his diaries. Adam Czerniaków is interred in the Okopowa Street Jewish Cemetery in Warsaw.

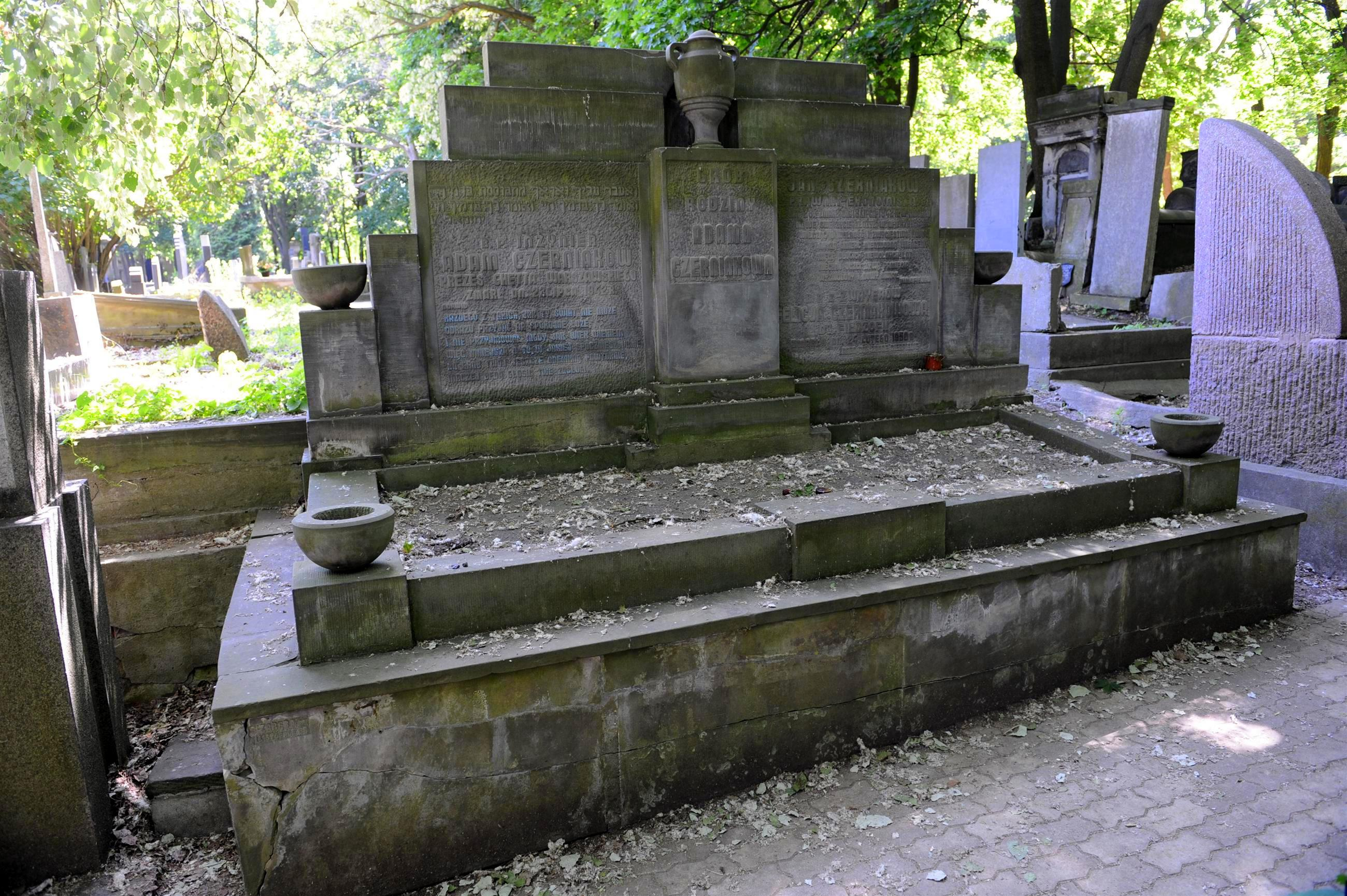
Adam Czerniaków's and his wife's grave at Jewish Cemetery in Warsaw

In the 2001 Warner Bros motion picture, Uprising, actor Donald Sutherland portrayed Adam Czerniaków. Excerpts of his diary are featured in the 2010 documentary film A Film Unfinished.

The theatre company Voices of the Holocaust toured England during 2013–14 with the play Fragile Fire based on the Warsaw Ghetto uprising which featured scenes depicting Czerniaków. In 2015 the actor and writer Tim Dalgleish (formerly of Voices of the Holocaust) wrote a full-length play based on Czerniaków's journals called The Last Days of Adam: The true story of Adam Czerniaków. The play depicted Czerniaków as a conflicted character, torn between the need to ameliorate the worst excesses of the Nazis and the danger of being manipulated into becoming a collaborator.

American composer Arnold Rosner's From the Diaries of Adam Czerniaków, Op. 82 is a half-hour classical music work composed in 1986 and scored for full orchestra and a narrator, who reads selected diary entries. The work was commissioned and later recorded by the conductor David Amos. According to the work's only commercial recording, made in 2015, the English translation of Czerniaków's words was made by Raul Hilberg and Stanislaw Staron, in collaboration with Josef Kermisz of Yad Vashem in Jerusalem.

=== Personal life ===
Czerniaków was married to dr Felicja Czerniaków on 24 July 1912. They had a son named Jan, who became a lawyer and economist. Following the invasion of Poland, Jan fled to Soviet Kyrgyzstan, where he died on July 18, 1942.

Felicja survived the war and lived in poor financial conditions till her death in 1950. She was buried next to her husband at the Okopowa Street Jewish Cemetery in Warsaw.

== In popular culture ==
Cerniaków was portrayed by Canadian actor Donald Sutherland in the 2001 film Uprising.

== See also ==
- Julian Tuwim, a nephew of Adam Czerniaków
- Chaim Rumkowski, Jewish Council's head in the Łódź Ghetto
