= Ferdinand von Sammern-Frankenegg =

Austrian Nazi and SS general (1897–1944)

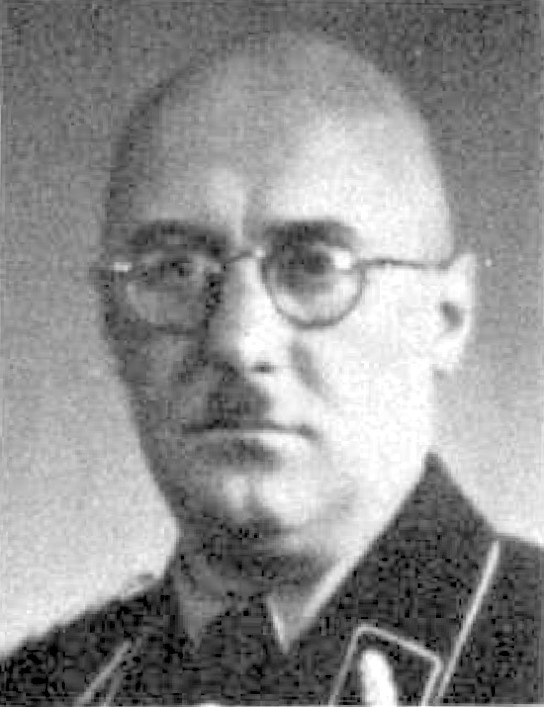
- Sammern-Frankenegg in 1938

Reichstag Deputy
- In office 10 April 1938 – 20 September 1944

Personal details
- Born: 17 March 1897 Grieskirchen, Upper Austria, Austria-Hungary
- Died: 20 September 1944 (aged 47) Banja Luka, Croatia
- Education: Doctor of Law
- Alma mater: University of Innsbruck
- Profession: Lawyer
- Known for: Warsaw Ghetto deportations (1942)
- Awards: Iron Cross, 1st and 2nd class

Military service
- Allegiance: Austria-Hungary; Nazi Germany
- Branch/service: Austro-Hungarian Army; Allgemeine SS
- Years of service: 1916–1919; 1933–1944
- Rank: Oberleutnant; SS-Brigadeführer and Generalmajor der Polizei
- Commands: Commander, 37th SS-Standarte; Commander, SS-Abschnitt IX; Acting SSPF, Warsaw District; Police Area Commander, Esseg
- Battles/wars: World War I World War II

Ferdinand August Friedrich von Sammern-Frankenegg (17 March 1897 – 20 September 1944) was an Austrian lawyer and member of the Schutzstaffel (SS) who rose to the rank of SS-Brigadeführer in Nazi Germany. After the Anschluss with Germany, he was elected as a deputy of the Reichstag. During the Second World War, he was the SS and Police Leader (SSPF) of the Warsaw District and directed mass deportations from the Warsaw Ghetto to the Treblinka extermination camp between July and September 1942. After he failed to suppress the Warsaw Ghetto Uprising in April 1943, he was relieved of his command. While serving as a police area commander in Croatia, he was killed in action against Yugoslav partisans.

== Early life ==
Sammern-Frankenegg was born in Grieskirchen in Austria-Hungary, the son of a district court official. He attended schools in Wels and Linz. Graduating in the midst of the First World War, he volunteered for service in the Austro-Hungarian Army. From February 1916, he served in the front lines on the Italian front as a member of the 1st Kaiserschützen Regiment and, from April 1917, with the 9th K.u.k. Feldjäger Battalion. He fought in several of the Battles of the Isonzo and, on 4 November 1918, he was taken prisoner by Italian forces. He was released in September 1919, and left the military at that time with the rank of Oberleutnant.

Sammern-Frankenegg returned to school to study law and received his doctorate of law degree in 1922 from the University of Innsbruck. While at Innsbruck, he was a member of the dueling fraternity Universitätssängerschaft Skalden zu Innsbruck. He worked for a year at the Regional Court in Wels and then for six years in legal practice there. In 1930, he opened a law practice in Peuerbach. He was subsequently a member of several right-wing and Völkisch groups, including the German Freikorps Oberland (1920–1924) in Innsbruck and Wels, the Deutsch-Völkischer Turnverein (1925–1929) in Wels and the Styrian Home Guard (1930–1932).

== Peacetime SS career ==
In December 1932, Sammern-Frankenegg joined the Schutzstaffel (SS number 292,792) and, on 1 March 1933, he joined the Austrian Nazi Party (membership number 1,456,955). He served as a part-time Ortsgruppenleiter (local group leader) from February 1933, a Party district court leader from 1936 and a district speaker. On 15 June 1935, he succeeded Ernst Kaltenbrunner as the commander of the 37th SS-Standarte in Linz, which he would continue to lead until March 1939. For ongoing subversive Nazi activities in Austria, Sammern-Frankenegg received a fine and two prison sentences, and was interned for three months at the Anhaltelager Kaisersteinbruch (Kaisersteinbruch detention camp). After the March 1938 Anschluss with Germany, he left his legal practice to become a full-time SS functionary. At the parliamentary election of 10 April, he was elected as a Nazi deputy to the Reichstag from the newly renamed Ostmark, a seat he would hold until his death. On 1 March 1939, he was assigned as the leader of SS-Abschnitt (SS district) IX, headquartered in Würzburg. On 1 July, he took a 3-month staff posting as the Stabsführer (chief of staff) of SS-Oberabschnitt (SS main district) "Main" in Nuremberg. On 1 September, he returned to Wurzburg where he remained in command until 1 July 1943.

== Holocaust actions in Poland ==
During the Second World War, Sammern-Frankenegg was appointed as the acting SS and Police Leader (SSPF) of the Warsaw District in German-occupied Poland on 22 July 1942, while the incumbent, SS-Oberführer Arpad Wigand, was on assignment with the Waffen-SS. He was in charge of the Großaktion Warschau, the single most deadly operation against the Jews in the course of the Holocaust in occupied Poland, which entailed sending between 254,000 and 265,000 men, women and children aboard overcrowded Holocaust trains to the Treblinka extermination camp. This "liquidation" of the Warsaw Ghetto between 23 July and 21 September 1942 was disguised as a "resettlement action" to trick the victims into not resisting. It was a major part of the murderous campaign codenamed Operation Reinhard, part of the Final Solution.

Sammern-Frankenegg was still in command at Warsaw when renewed deportations began on 18 January 1943. The Germans planned to deport 8,000 remaining Jews but, this time, they encountered unexpected barricades and armed resistance and, after suffering casualties, suspended the deportations after 4 days. Reichsführer-SS Heinrich Himmler determined to totally destroy the ghetto. At 3:00 a.m. on 19 April 1943, Sammern-Frankenegg commenced the operation and ordered that the ghetto be cleared within 3 days. When the Nazi security forces entered the ghetto at 6:00 a.m. intent on completing the deportations, they once more were met by fierce armed resistance and suffered casualties. This was the beginning of the Warsaw Ghetto Uprising and Sammern-Frankenegg's offensive operation to suppress the revolt was unsuccessful. By 8:00 a.m., Himmler relieved him of command and replaced him with SS-Brigadeführer Jürgen Stroop.

== Transfer to Croatia and death ==
Sammern-Frankenegg was transferred to Croatia on 23 April 1943 as the Polizeigebietsführer (police area commander) in Esseg (today, Osijek), reporting to Konstantin Kammerhofer, the Higher SS and Police Leader (HSSPF) for Croatia. There, he was chiefly engaged in Bandenbekämpfung, or anti-partisan operations. On 20 April 1944, Sammern-Frankenegg received his final promotion to SS-Brigadeführer and Generalmajor of police. On 20 September 1944, he was killed in an artillery barrage by Yugoslav partisans near the city of Banja Luka. He was posthumously awarded the Iron Cross, 1st class and was buried in Esseg.

== SS Ranks ==
Sammern-Frankenegg's SS Ranks
Date	Rank
20 April 1935	SS-Untersturmführer
9 November 1936	SS-Obersturmführer
20 April 1937	SS-Hauptsturmführer
9 November 1937	SS-Sturmbannführer
17 March 1938	SS-Standartenführer
30 January 1941	SS-Oberführer
20 July 1944	SS-Brigadeführer und Generalmajor der Polizei

== Sources ==
- Information about Ferdinand von Sammern-Frankenegg in the Reichstag database
- Klee, Ernst (2007). Das Personenlexikon zum Dritten Reich. Wer war was vor und nach 1945. Frankfurt-am-Main: Fischer-Taschenbuch-Verlag. ISBN 978-3-596-16048-8.
- Stockhorst, Erich (1985). 5000 Köpfe: Wer War Was im 3. Reich. Arndt. ISBN 978-3-887-41116-9.
- "Warsaw Ghetto Uprising" by the United States Holocaust Memorial Museum
- Yerger, Mark C. (1997). The Allgemeine-SS: The Commands, Units and Leaders of the General SS. Schiffer Publishing Ltd. ISBN 0-7643-0145-4.
- Zentner, Christian; Bedürftig, Friedemann, eds. (1997) [1991]. The Encyclopedia of the Third Reich. New York: Da Capo Press. ISBN 978-0-306-80793-0.
