= Luba Blum-Bielicka =

Polish socialist activist and nurse in the Warsaw Ghetto

Luba Bielicka Blum (1906, Wilno, Vilna Governorate - 1973, Warsaw) was a Polish socialist activist of the Bund, and a nurse in the Warsaw Ghetto.

== Early life ==
She was born in Wilno, then a part of the Russian Empire, into a Jewish Orthodox family of ten children and received her secondary education there. While in a gymnasium she met her future husband Abrasza Blum and along with him, joined the Bund's youth movement, the Tsukunft. She attended the nursing school in Warsaw, became its assistant director and was responsible for the training of new nurses. During this time she married Abrasza and they had two children.

== World War II ==
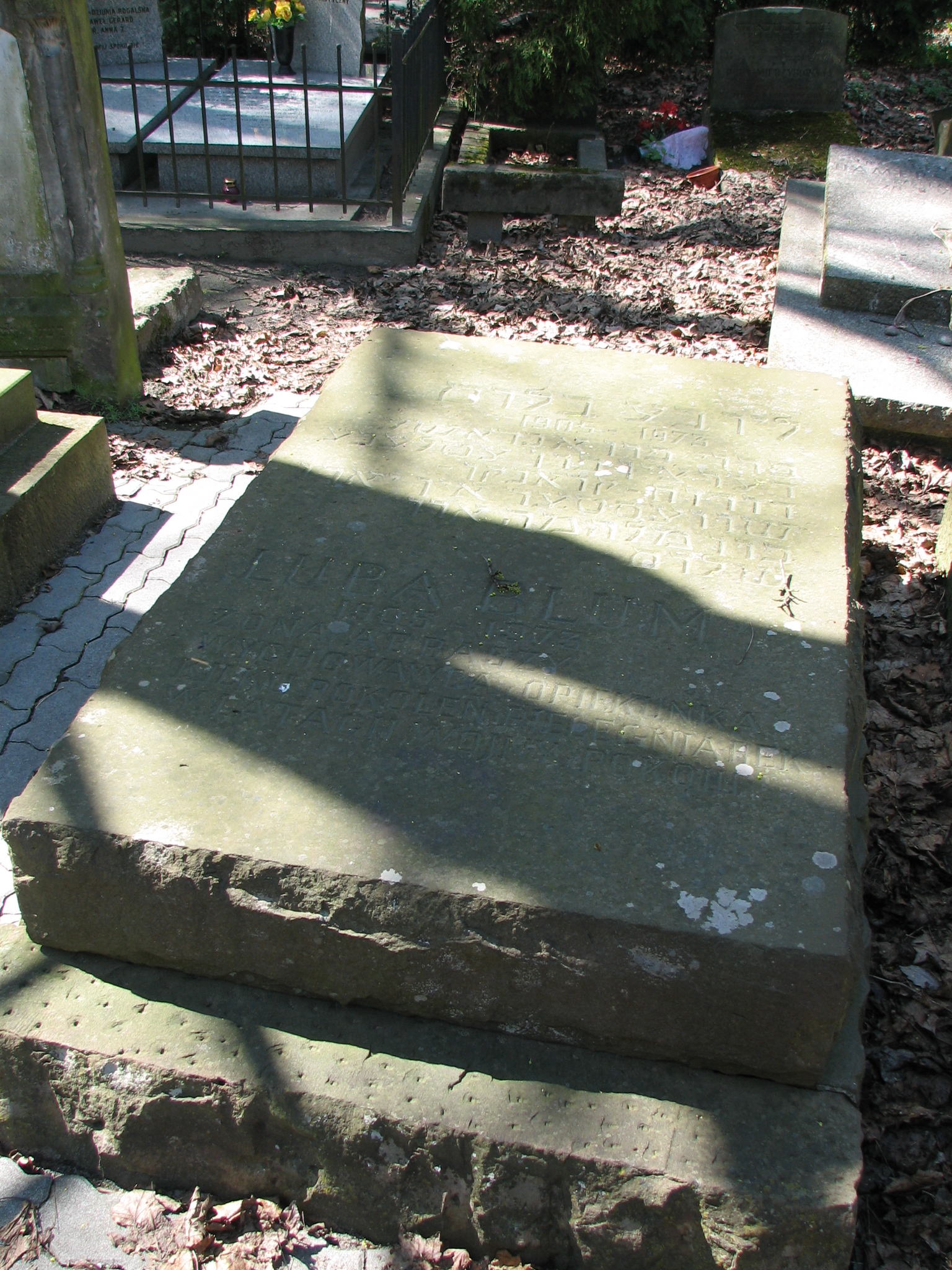
Luba's grave at the Okopowa Street Jewish Cemetery

With the German invasion of Poland and the subsequent departure of some of the staff, Luba became the director of the school. Soon after the school was closed by the Germans and Luba and her family were forced to move into the Warsaw Ghetto. Luba managed to have the nursing school reopened inside the ghetto, as the Nursing School of the Jewish Hospital, and continued the training of nurses under new, harsh, conditions. This was the only educational establishment allowed by the Germans in the Ghetto, with about 60 students in training.

When the German authorities commenced with the liquidation of the Warsaw Ghetto, the students from Luba's school were taken to the Umschlagplatz and from there to the Treblinka extermination camp. Luba's and Abrasza's children, Wiktoria and Alexander, were taken to the deportation point as well, but, with help from Polish nurses, she managed to have them smuggled out before the actual deportation to the camp took place. However, soon after, in the January Aktion the Nazis took over her hospital, and executed all the patients, including newborn infants, and most of the staff. Luba and her children survived by hiding in the cellar of the hospital.

When the Warsaw Ghetto Uprising erupted Luba's husband took an active part in it and was one of the leaders of the Jewish Fighting Organization (ZOB) that fought against the Germans. He also managed to escape from the ghetto right before the fall of the uprising but was captured while hiding on the "Aryan side" and murdered by the Gestapo. Luba and her daughter successfully hid in Warsaw using false papers, while Luba's son stayed with another Polish family and also survived the Holocaust. They were reunited when the Red Army entered Warsaw.

== Post war and recognition ==
After the war Luba was the director of the children's home in Otwock and later worked in a new nursing school in Warsaw. She received the Florence Nightingale Medal in 1966 for her work as a nurse in a children's hospital in the Warsaw Ghetto during the German occupation of Poland. She also worked in a hospital in New York.

She died in 1973 in Warsaw and was buried in the main alley of the Okopowa Street Jewish Cemetery.
