= Abraham Blum =

Polish Bundist activist and World War II resistance leader

Abraham Blum (also known as Abrasza Blum; born c. 1905, Wilno (now Vilnius) – May 1943, Warsaw) was a Polish-Jewish socialist activist, one of the leaders of the Bund in the Warsaw Ghetto and a participant in the Warsaw Ghetto Uprising.

== Early life and activism ==
He was a student in the cheder metukan ("improved cheder") in Wilno, where he met his wife Luba. They had two children. Abrasza studied structural engineering at a technical school in Gent, Belgium. By 1929 they resided in Warsaw. Initially he belonged to a communist youth organization but later became active in the Jewish socialist Bund, including its youth branch, the Cukunft. Beginning in 1930 he was one of the directors of the party's paper. He organized secular Jewish schools for the Bund.

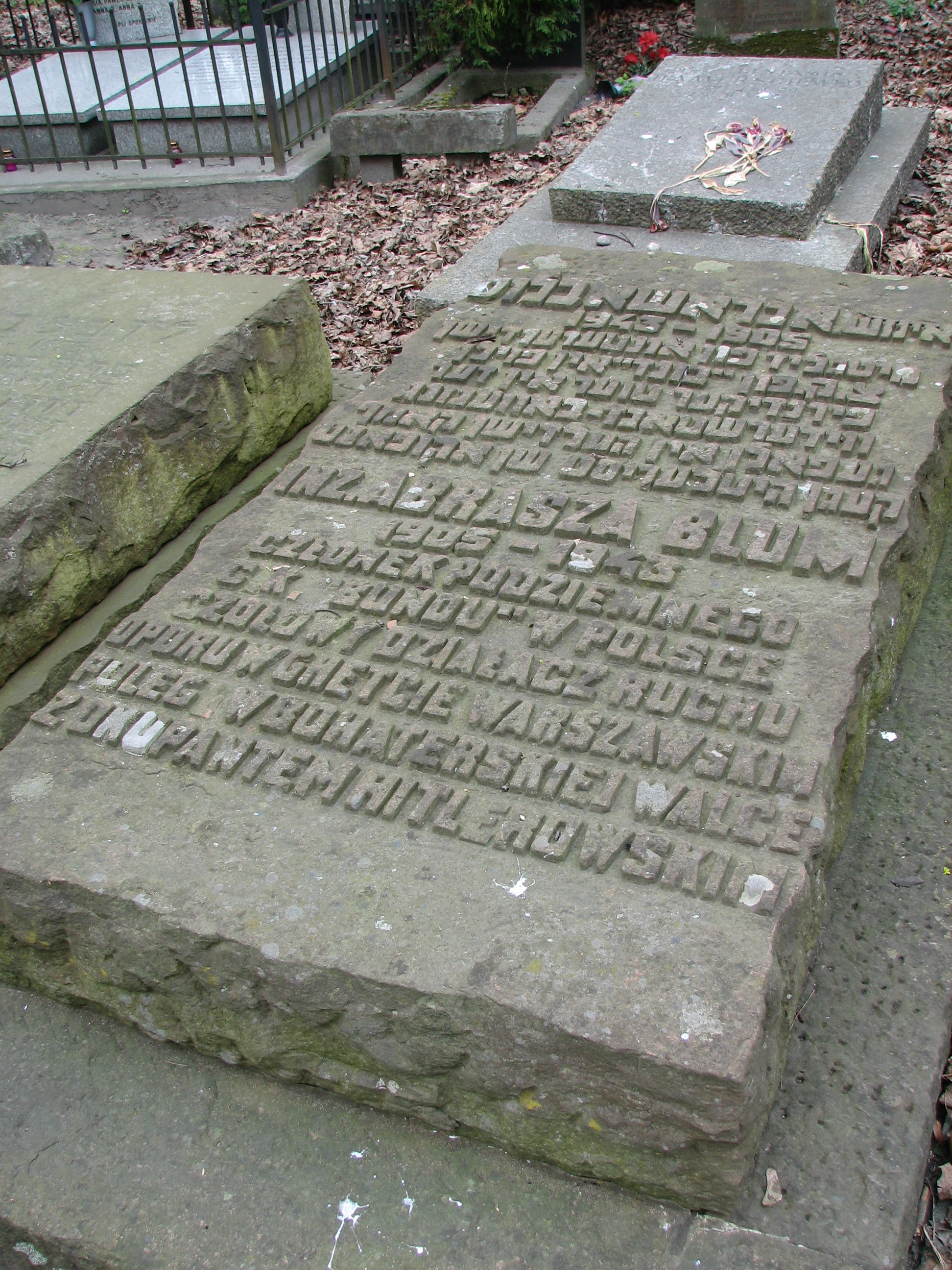
Abraham Blum's symbolic grave at Okopowa Street. Inscription reads "Abrasza Blum, eng., 1905-1943. Member of the underground coordinating committee of the Bund in Poland. Leading activist in the resistance of the Warsaw Ghetto. Died in the heroic struggle against the Nazi occupiers."

== German invasion of Poland ==
During the invasion of Poland by Nazi Germany in September 1939 he participated in the defense of Warsaw. Together with the leader of the Bund, Szmul Zygielbojm, and with support from Warsaw's mayor Stefan Starzyński, he helped to organize all-Jewish detachments that defended the Polish capital against the German assault. Along with other Bund activists Blum continued to edit the party's newspaper, the Folkszajtung ("the People's Gazette") ensuring that it did not cease publication during the siege. As the occupation of Warsaw commenced most of the Bund's senior leadership was forced to evacuate the city, as they may have been too well known to the Germans, and the local leadership of the party was taken over by younger members, many of them from the Cukunft. Blum, who was their leader, has been credited with ensuring the Warsaw Bund's survival during this difficult time.

== Warsaw Ghetto, the uprising and death ==
After Poland's capitulation and the capture of Warsaw by German forces he was forced into the Warsaw Ghetto. From the end of November 1942 he was on the Bund's Coordinating Commission of the Jewish National Council. Most likely, together with Maurycy Orzech, he was one of Bund's representatives in negotiations with the Anti-Fascist Block (an alliance between leftist-Zionist, communist and socialist Polish Jewish parties).

He was considered by many Bundists and other leftist activists, including Marek Edelman for whom Blum was a "spiritual leader", to be one of the main intellectuals of the Block. Between 1942 and 1943 he worked in a brush factory on Franciszkanska Street. He was the Bund representative in the political bureau of the Jewish Fighting Organization (ŻOB).

He took an active part in the Warsaw Ghetto Uprising. He escaped the final liquidation of the ghetto by the Germans through the sewers. He first hid in the private apartment of Eugenia Wasowska-Leszczynska on Żurawia street and then in the apartment of Władysława Kowalska-Meed (nom de guerre "Władka") on Barok St. 2 in Warsaw. He was discovered by the janitor of the building who reported him to the Gestapo (the janitor was later sentenced to death on this account by the Polish Home Army). Blum tried to escape through the window on a rope made from bedsheets but broke his legs in the fall from the third story and was captured. He was captured and murdered by the Gestapo.

== Family and legacy ==
His wife, Luba Blum-Bielicka, was a director of a nursing school in the Warsaw Ghetto. Together with their children, she survived the German occupation of Poland and the Holocaust. After the war she was the director of the orphanage in Otwock, and until 1949 the director of the Nurse School no. 3 in Warsaw.

His symbolic grave is located on the main alley of the Jewish cemetery at Okopowa street.
