= Grossaktion Warsaw =

Nazi operation to deport and murder Jews from the Warsaw Ghetto during WWII

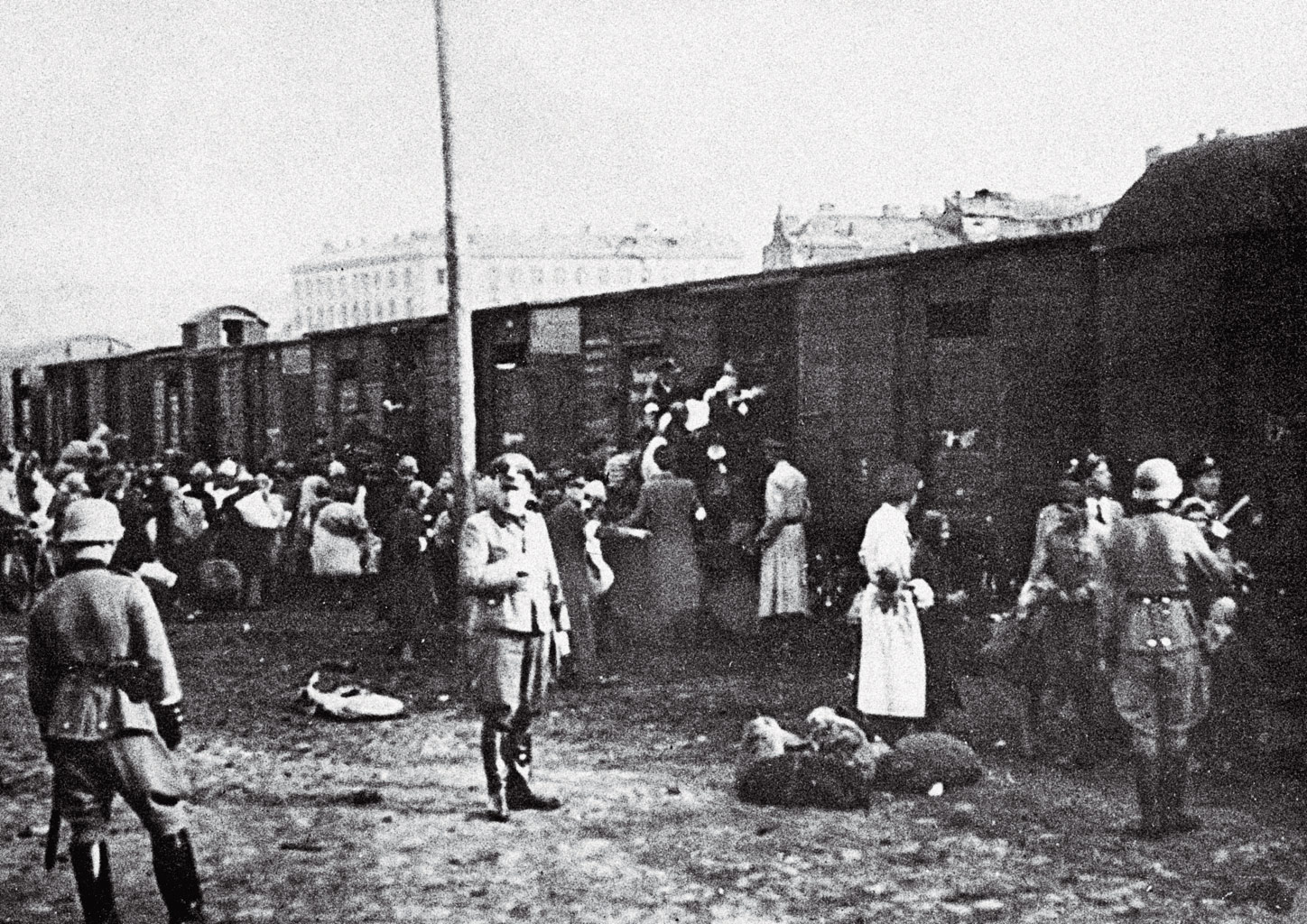
- Deportation of ghetto inmates at the Umschlagplatz

- Location of Warsaw Ghetto in World War II, southwest of Treblinka extermination camp

- Location of Warsaw in Poland today Warsaw Ghetto (Masovian Voivodeship)
- Location: Warsaw, German-occupied Poland; 52.1446°N 20.5945°E
- Date: 23 July 1942 – 21 September 1942
- Incident type: Deportations to Treblinka, mass shootings
- Organizations: Nazi SS
- Camp: Treblinka extermination camp
- Ghetto: Warsaw Ghetto
- Victims: 265,000 Polish Jews

The Grossaktion Warsaw ("Great Action") was the Nazi code name for the deportation and mass murder of Jews from the Warsaw Ghetto during the summer of 1942, beginning on 22 July. During the Grossaktion, Jews were terrorized in daily round-ups, marched through the ghetto, and assembled at the Umschlagplatz station square for what was called in the Nazi euphemistic jargon "resettlement to the East". From there, they were sent aboard overcrowded Holocaust trains to the extermination camp in Treblinka.

The largest number of Warsaw Jews were transported to their deaths at Treblinka in the period between the Jewish holidays Tisha B'Av (23 July) and Yom Kippur (21 September) in 1942. The killing centre had been completed 80 kilometres (50 mi) from Warsaw only weeks earlier, specifically for the Final Solution. Treblinka was equipped with gas chambers disguised as showers for the "processing" of entire transports of people. Led by the SS-leader Brigadeführer Odilo Globocnik, the campaign, codenamed Operation Reinhard, became the critical part of the Holocaust in occupied Poland.

== History ==
The Warsaw Ghetto was the largest World War II ghetto in all of Nazi occupied Europe, with more than 400,000 Jews crammed into an area of 1.3 square miles (3.4 km^{2}; 830 acres), 7.2 persons per room. The Nazi police conducted most of the mass deportations of the ghetto inmates to Treblinka via pendulum trains carrying up to 7,000 victims each. Every day, trains consisting of overcrowded boxcars departed twice from the railway collection point (Umschlagplatz in German); the first in the early morning, and the second in the mid-afternoon. The extermination camp received most of the victims between 23 July and 21 September 1942. The Grossaktion (large-scale operation) was directed in the capital by SS- und Polizeiführer Ferdinand von Sammern-Frankenegg, the commander of the Warsaw area since 1941.

The turning point in the life of the Ghetto was 18 April 1942, marked by a new wave of mass executions by the SS.

Until that day, no matter how difficult life had been, the ghetto inhabitants felt that their everyday life, the very foundations of their existence, were based on something stabilized and durable... On April 18th the very basis of ghetto life started to move from under people's feet... By now everybody understood that the ghetto was to be liquidated, but nobody yet realized that its entire population was destined to die. — Marek Edelman

== Deportations ==
On 19 July 1942, SS Chief Heinrich Himmler ordered Friedrich-Wilhelm Krüger, the SS commander in charge of the General Government, to carry out the 'resettlement of the whole Jewish population of the General Government by 31 December 1942.' Three days later on 22 July 1942 the German SS, headed by the "Resettlement Commissioner" Sturmbannführer Hermann Höfle, called a meeting of the Ghetto Jewish Council Judenrat and informed its leader Adam Czerniaków about the "resettlement to the East". Czerniakow, who committed suicide after learning of the plan, was replaced by Marek Lichtenbaum. The population of the Ghetto was not informed about the real state of affairs. Only by the end of 1942 did they understand that the deportations, overseen by the Jewish Ghetto Police, were to the Treblinka death camp and not for the purpose of resettlement.

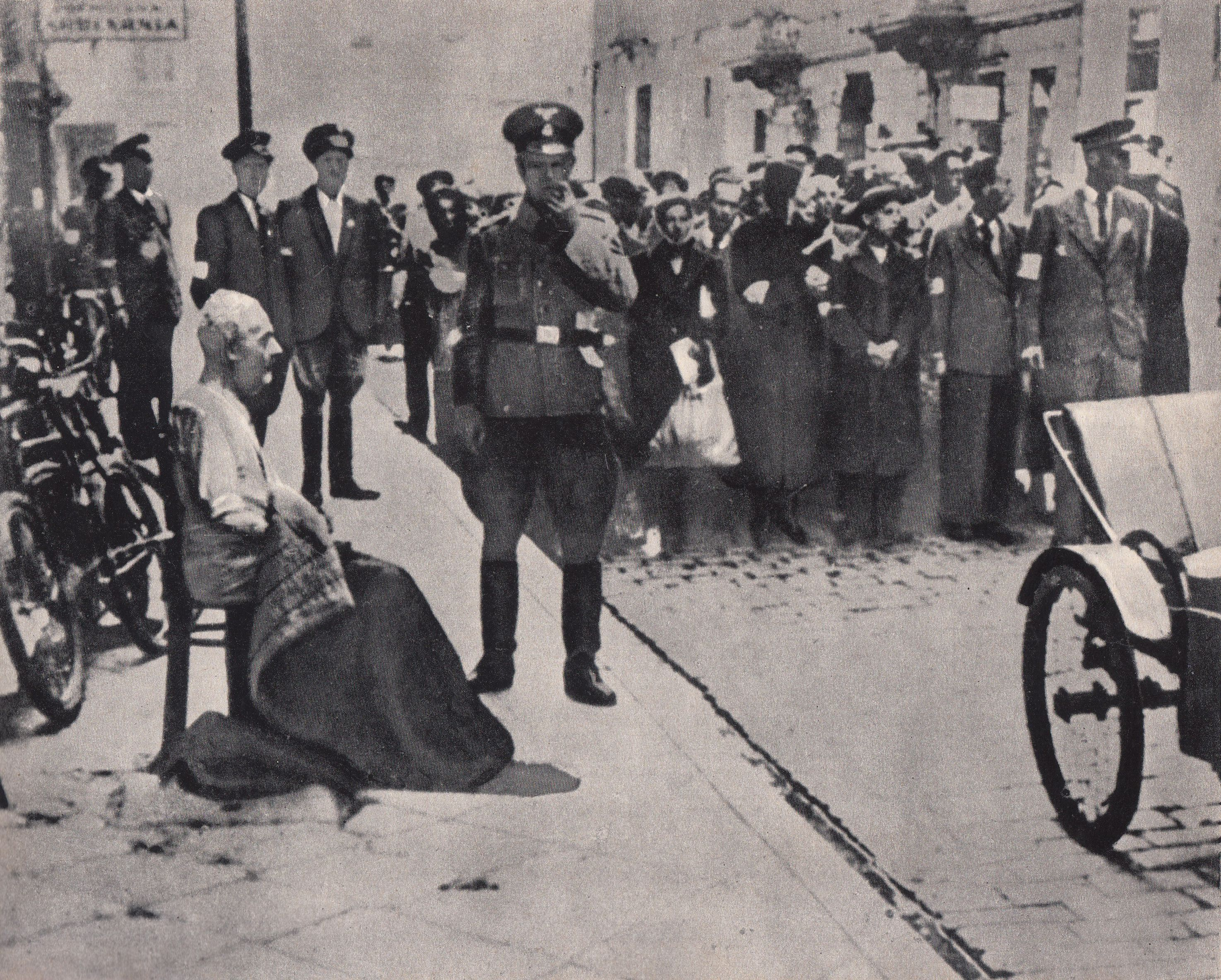
The Grossaktion Warschau 1942

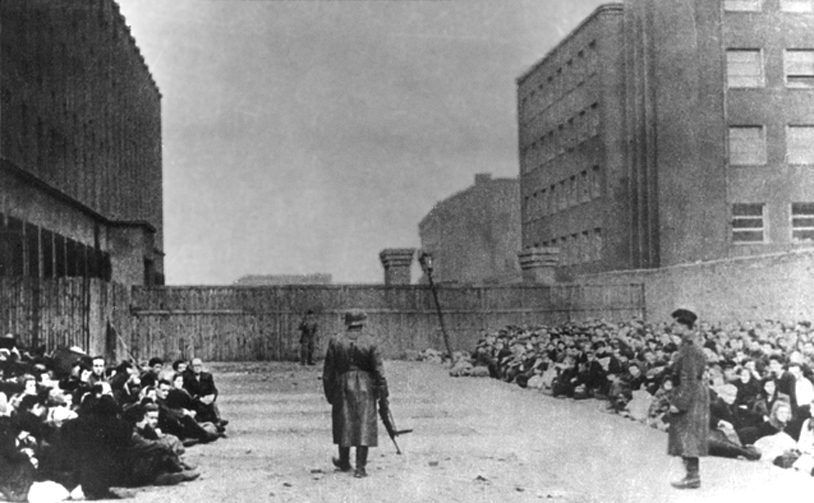
Umschlagplatz holding pen for deportations to Treblinka death camp

During the two months of summer 1942, about 254,000 – 265,000 Ghetto inmates, men, women and children, were sent to Treblinka and exterminated there (or at least 300,000 by different accounts, possibly, with the inclusion of the Ghetto falling considered by many a part of the operation). The sheer death toll among the Jewish inhabitants of the Ghetto during the Grossaktion would have been difficult to compare even with the liquidation of the Ghetto in the spring of the next year during and after the Ghetto Uprising, during which around 50,000 people were killed. The Grossaktion resulted in the death of five times as many victims. The actual razing of the ghetto did not result in the destruction of the Jewish population of Warsaw as much as had the Grossaktion of the summer of 1942.

For eight weeks the rail shipments of Jews to Treblinka went on without stopping: 100 people to a cattle truck, 5,000 to 6,000 each day, including hospital patients and orphanage children. Dr Janusz Korczak, a famed educator, went with them in August 1942. He was offered a chance to escape from the deportations by Polish friends and admirers, but he chose instead to share the fate of his people. On arrival at Treblinka, victims were stripped of their clothes and directed to one of ten chambers disguised as showers. There they were gassed to death in batches of 200 with the use of monoxide gas (Zyklon B was introduced at Auschwitz some time later). In September 1942, new gas chambers were built at Treblinka, which could kill as many as 3,000 people in just 2 hours. Civilians were forbidden to approach the area.

The tragic end of the Ghetto could not have been changed, but the road to it might have been different under a stronger leader. There can be no doubt that if the Uprising of the Warsaw Ghetto had taken place in August–September 1942, when there were still 300,000 Jews, the Germans would have paid a much higher price. — David J. Landau

Many of the remaining Jews in the Warsaw Ghetto decided to fight, and many were helped by the Polish underground. The Jewish Combat Organization (ŻOB, Hebrew: הארגון היהודי הלוחם) was formed in October 1942 and tasked with resisting any future deportations. It was led by 24 year–old Mordechai Anielewicz. Meanwhile, the Polish Home Army, Armia Krajowa (AK), began to smuggle weapons, ammunition and supplies into the Ghetto for the uprising. Von Sammern-Frankenegg was relieved of duty by Heinrich Himmler on April 17, 1943, and replaced with SS- und Polizeiführer Jürgen Stroop. Stroop took over from von Sammern-Frankenegg because of his unsuccessful offensive against the Ghetto underground.

Ferdinand von Sammern-Frankenegg, in charge of the Grossaktion, was court-martialed by Himmler on 24 April 1943 for his ineptitude and sent to Croatia, where he died in a partisan ambush. Jürgen Stroop was awarded the Iron Cross First Class by the supreme commander of the Wehrmacht, Field Marshal General Wilhelm Keitel, for his "murder expedition" (Alfred Jodl). After the war, Stroop was tried for war crimes by the Americans, convicted, and sentenced to death. His execution was not carried out; instead, he was handed over to the Polish authorities for re-trial. He was again convicted and sentenced to death in Poland and executed at the site of the Warsaw Ghetto on 8 September 1951.

== Timeline of events ==
Timeline of the Grossaktion Warsaw
22 July 1942	Germans with Ukrainian and Latvian guards in SS uniforms surround the walls of the Ghetto
23 July 1942	Adam Czerniaków commits suicide after being told to prepare for transport of 6,000 Jews a day
23 July 1942	Mass murder of Jews by gassing begins at the Treblinka death camp
6 August 1942	Fifteen thousand Jews from the Ghetto are deported to Treblinka in a single day as a result of the German food giveaway. People line up for several days to be "deported" in order to obtain bread. Transports twice daily can not accommodate them all.
13–27 August 1942	In 15 days 53,750 Warsaw Jews are deported to Treblinka
6–7 September 1942	More than 1000 Jews are killed by Nazis in the streets of the Ghetto
6–21 September 1942	In the last two weeks of the Aktion 48,000 Warsaw Jews are deported to their deaths
21 September 1942	The last transport sent to Treblinka from the Polish capital with 2,196 victims. It includes Jewish police involved with deportations, and their families.
30 September 1942	Jews trapped in the Ghetto begin to construct fortified bunkers to defend themselves

== See also ==
- Jewish ghettos in German-occupied Poland
- Gross Aktion in the Kovno Ghetto, known as Kaunas massacre of October 29, 1941
