= Warsaw District =

District of Nazi-occupied Poland

Warsaw District Distrikt Warschau
- Coat of arms

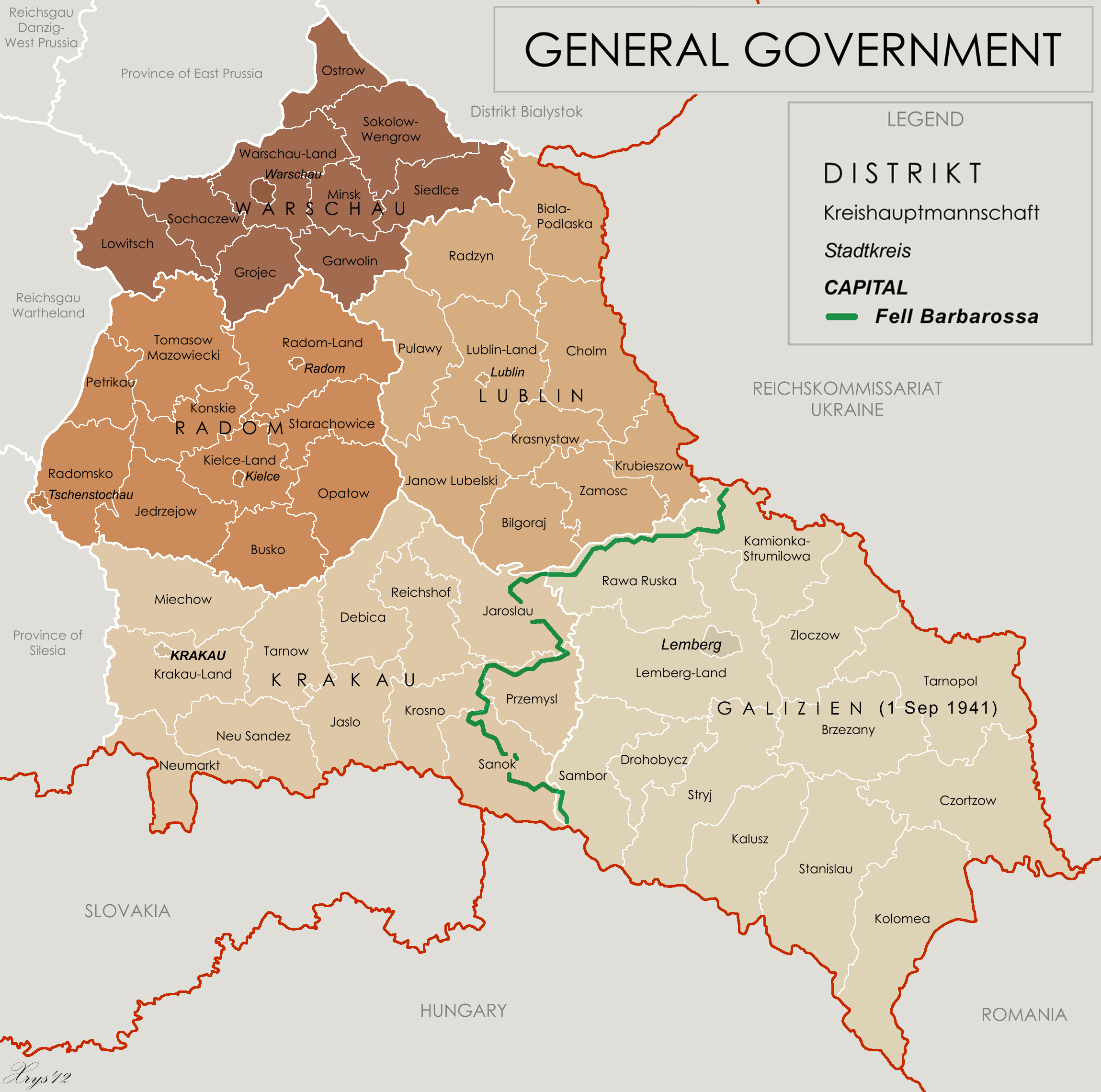
- Administrative map of the General Government in August 1941 following Barbarossa.

Warsaw District was one of the first four Nazi districts of the General Governorate region of German-occupied Poland during World War II, along with Lublin District, Radom District, and Kraków District. It was bordered on the north by Regierungsbezirk Zichenau (part of East Prussia) and Bezirk Bialystok. The region contained more than 60 Nazi ghettos including the Warsaw Ghetto.
