= Warsaw Ghetto boundary markers =

Memorial markers in Poland

- Pomniki granic warszawskiego getta
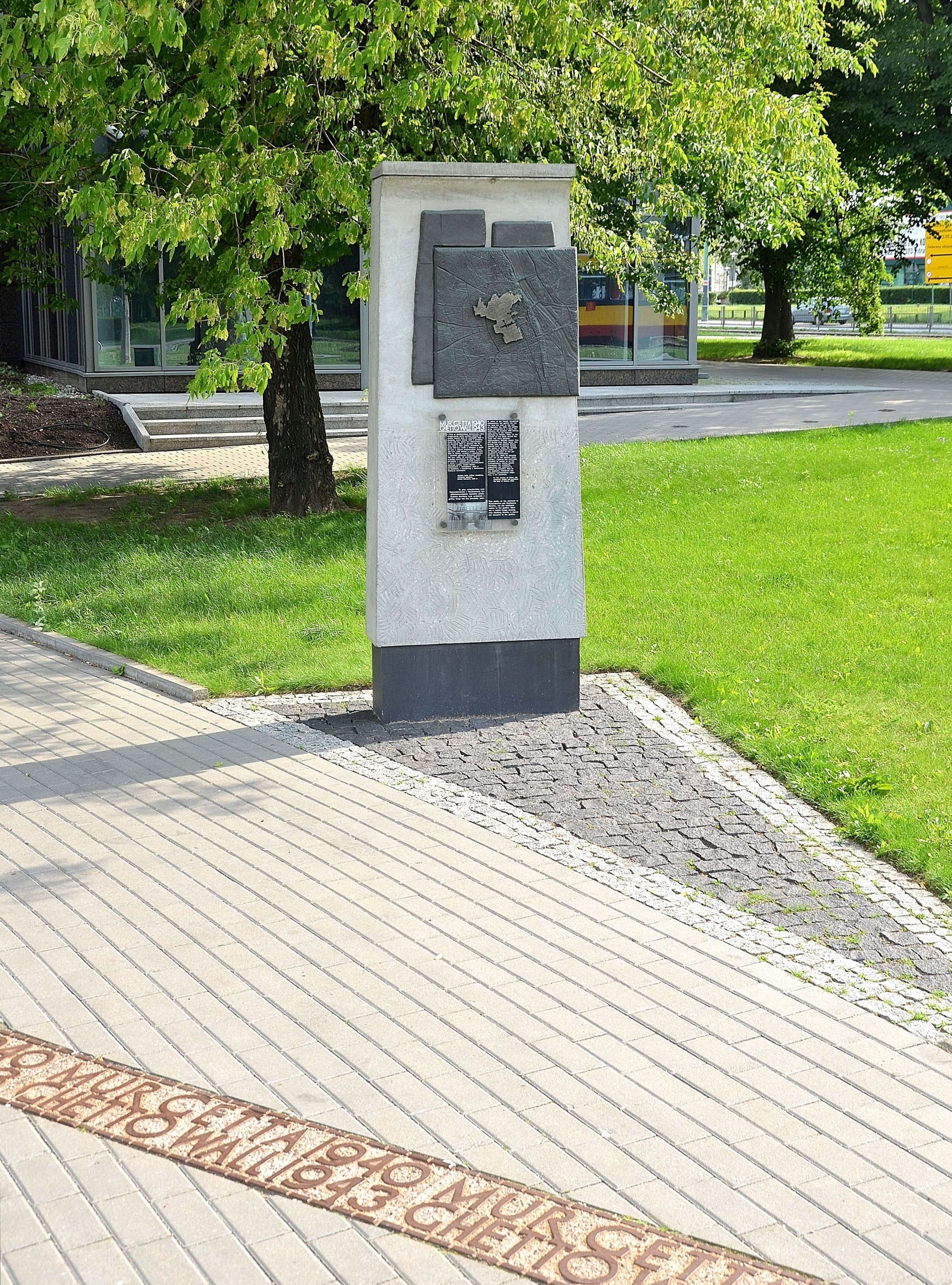
- Ghetto boundary marker in Bonifraterska Street
- Location: Warsaw
- Designer: Eleonora Bergman and Tomasz Lec
- Material: Bronze, cement
- Completion date: 2008, 2010

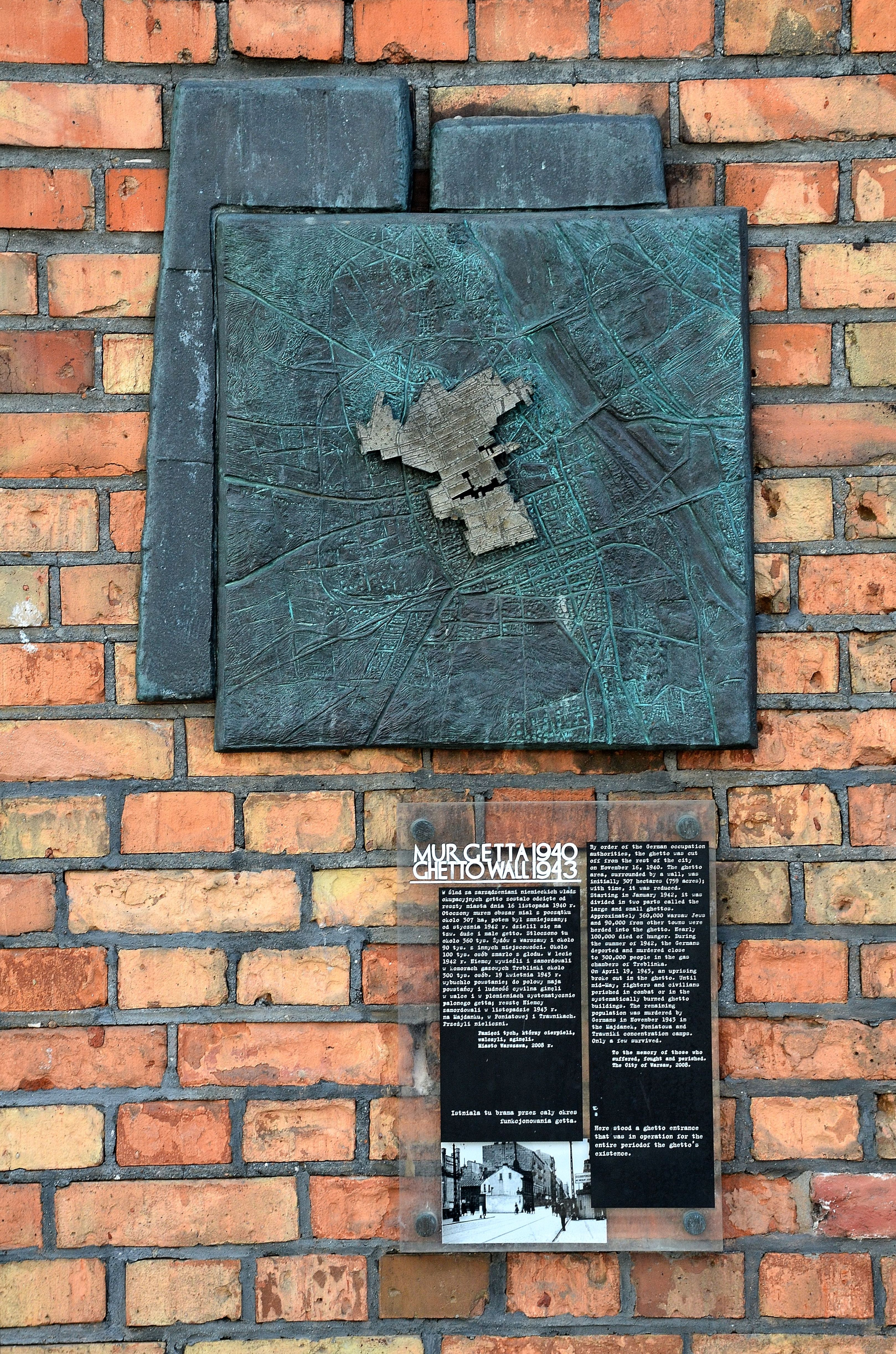
Plaques on the wall of the former "Duschik & Szolce" metal working factory at 63 Żelazna Street (on Grzybowska Street side)

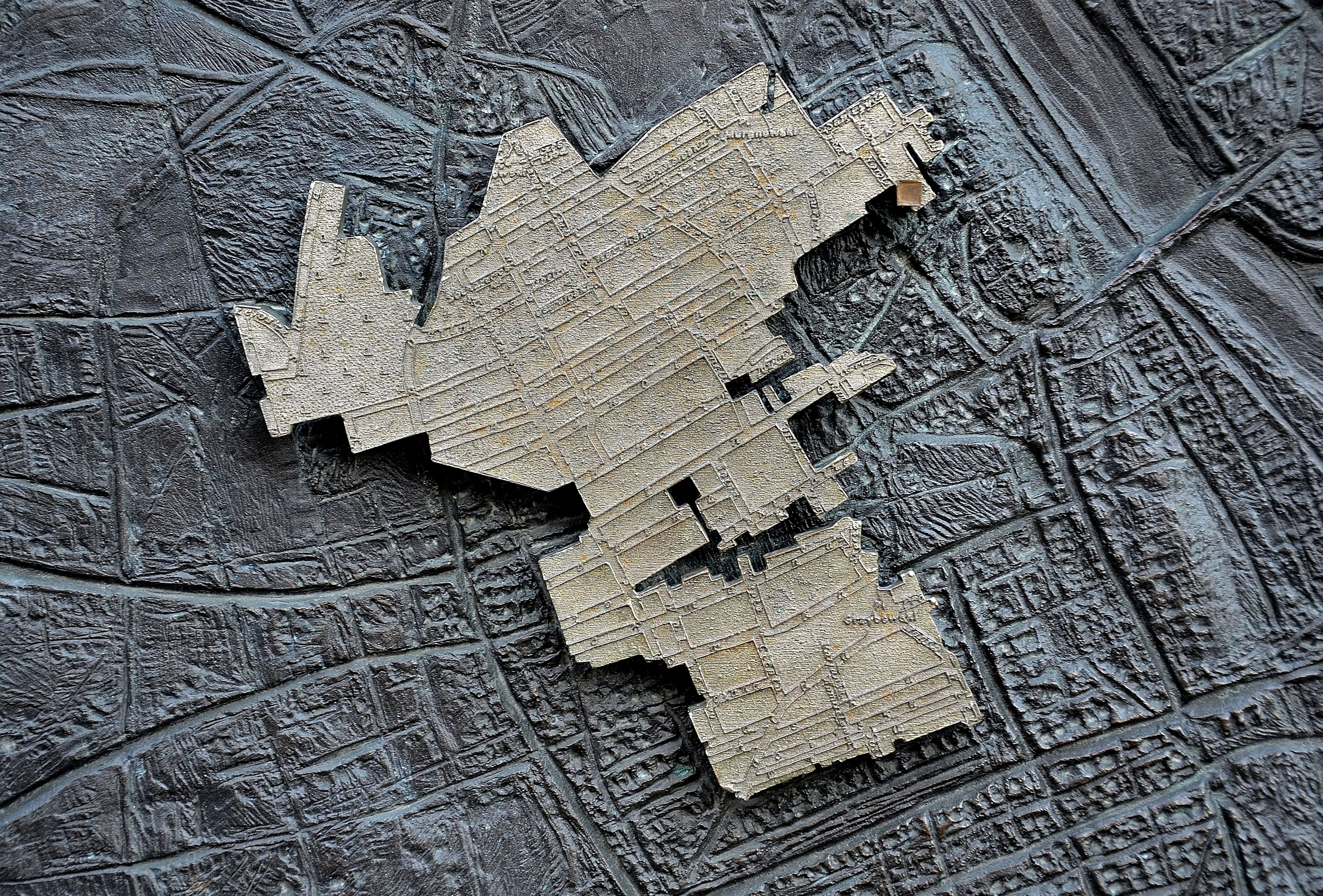
Close-up of the ghetto map with a pin marking the exact location of the commemorated place (Świętojerska Street)

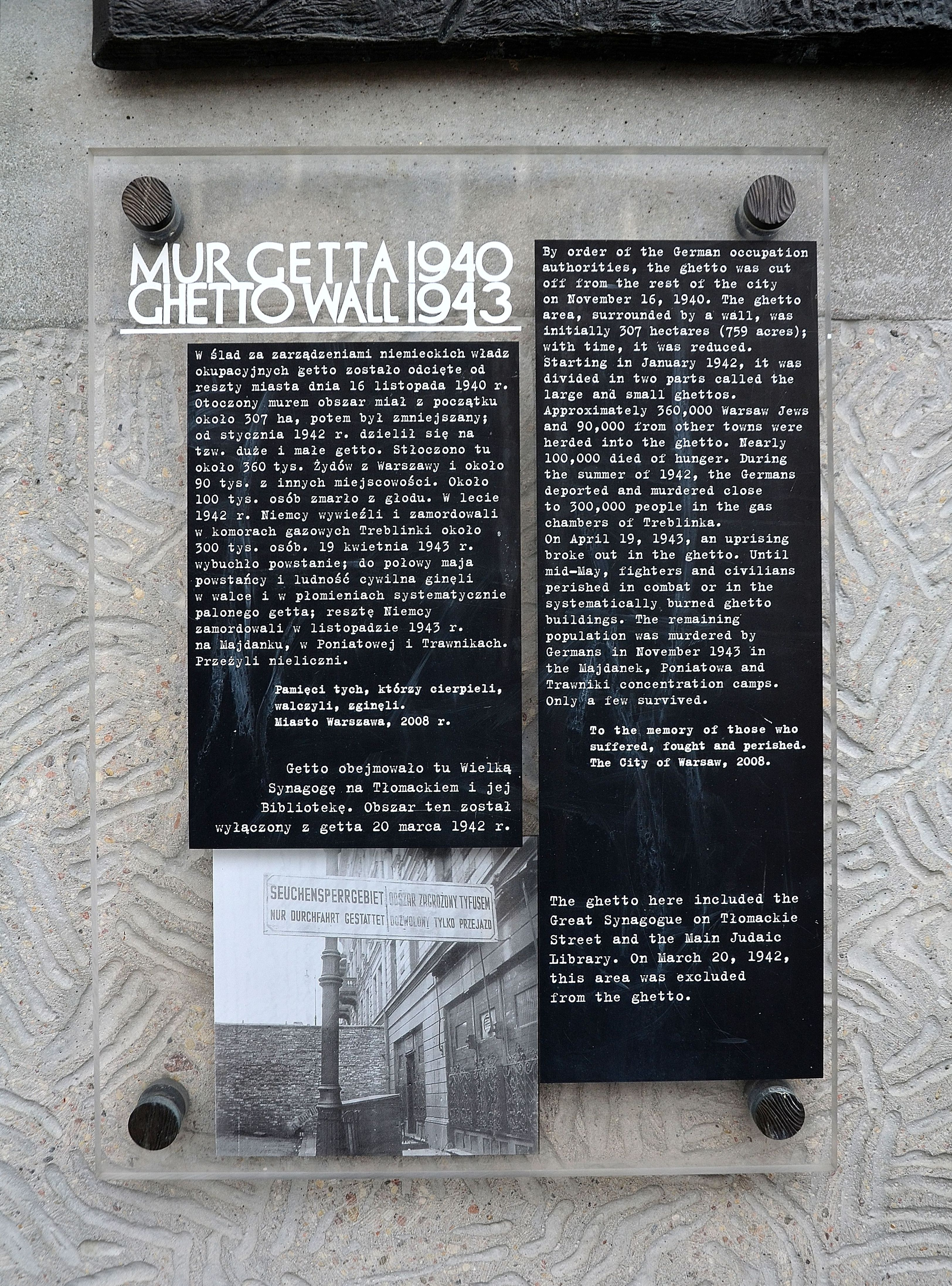
Plaque with historical information (Bielańska Street)

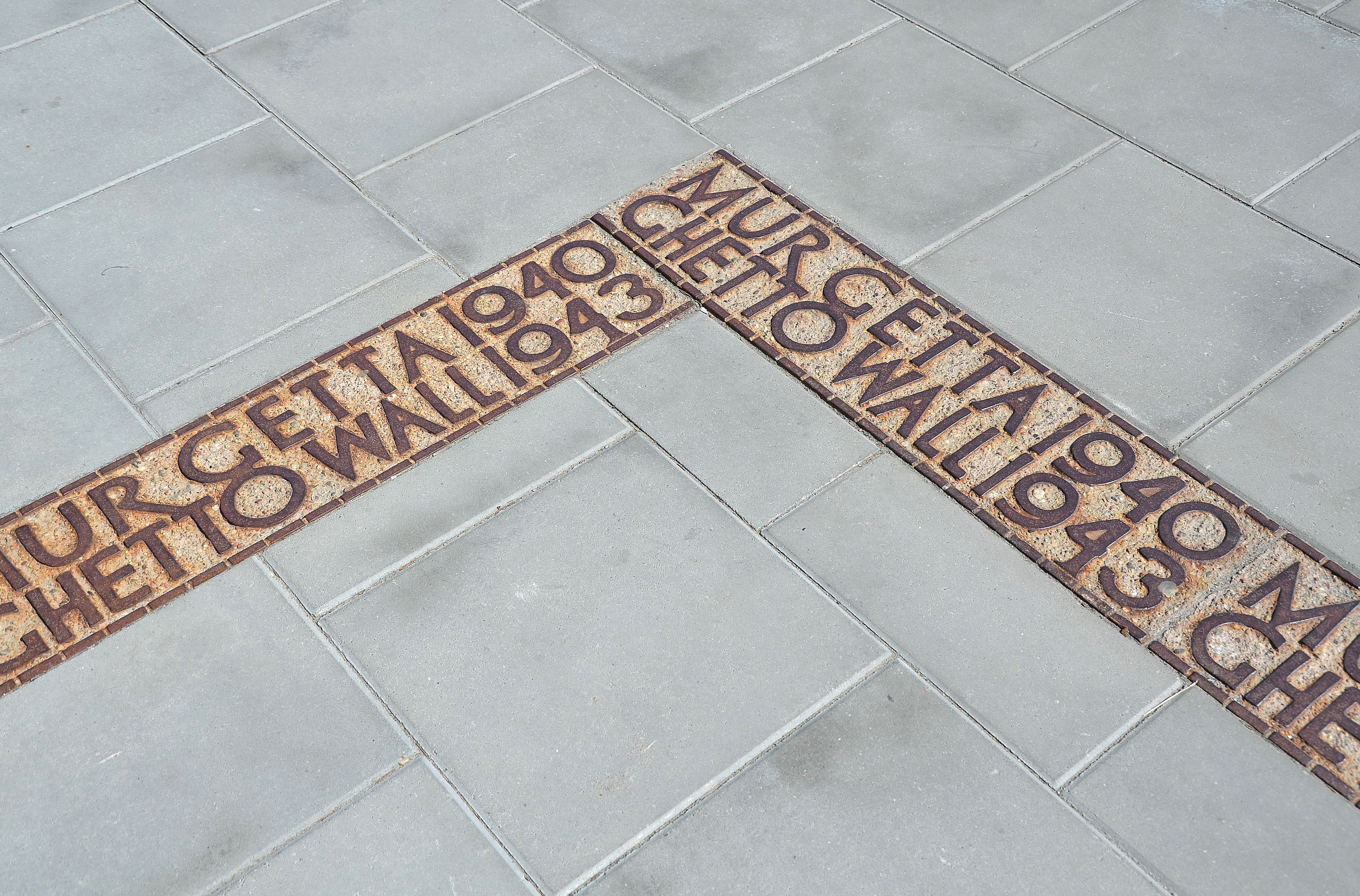
Ghetto boundary lines near the Palace of Culture and Science

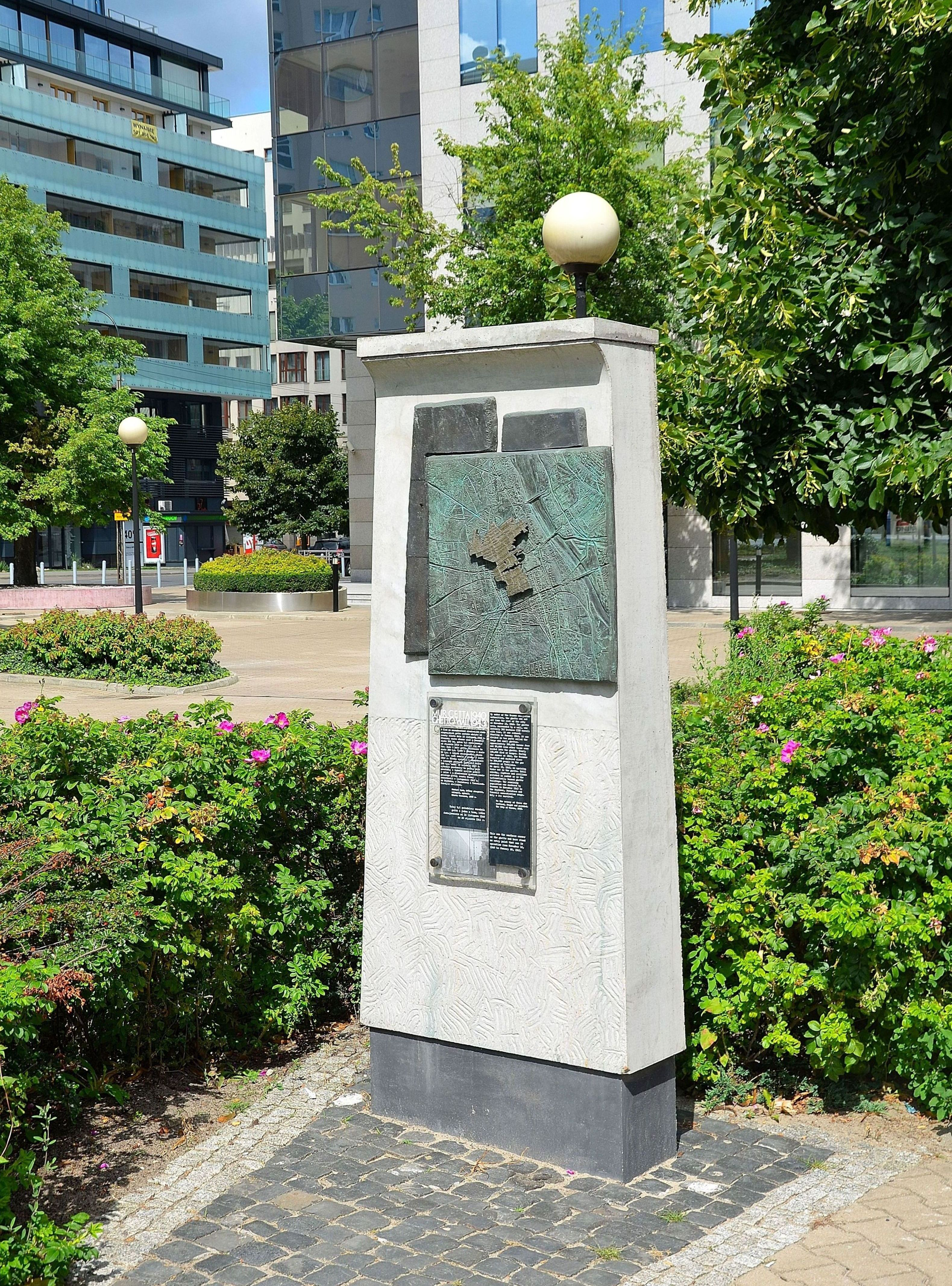
Ghetto boundary marker in Twarda Street

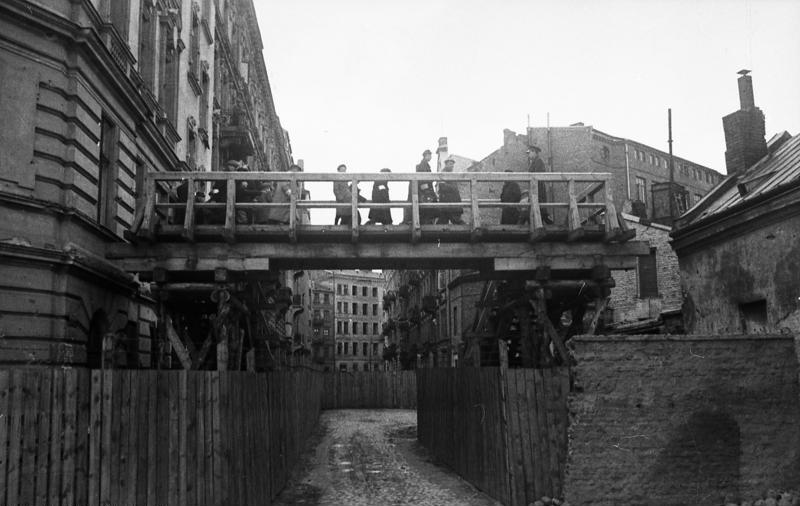
Wooden footbridge over Przebieg Street commemorated in Bonifraterska Street

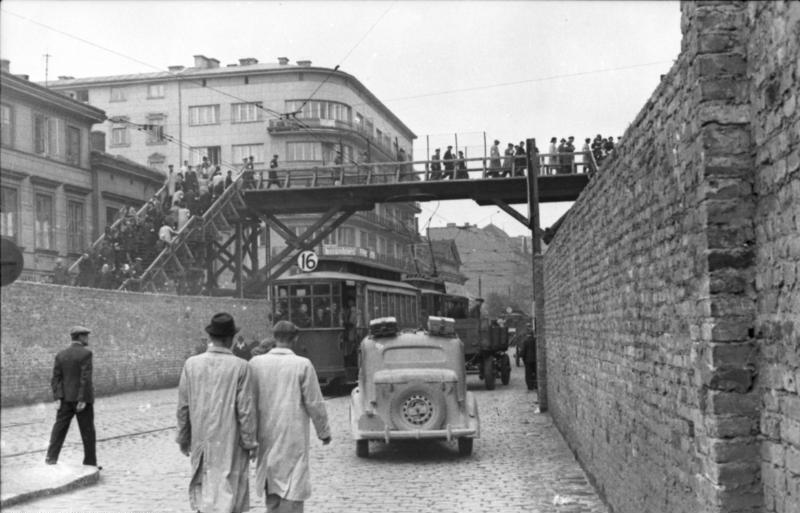
Ghetto walls lining both sides of Chłodna Street and the wooden footbridge which from January to August 1942 connected the small and big ghettos

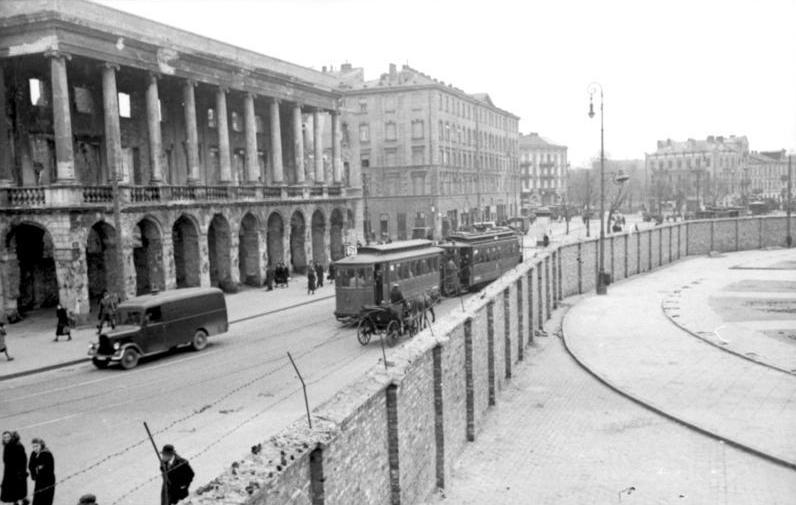
Ghetto wall in the Iron-Gate Square commemorated on Drzewieckiego Avenue

The Warsaw Ghetto boundary markers are memorial plaques and boundary lines that mark the maximum perimeter of the former ghetto established by Nazi Germany in 1940 in occupied Warsaw, Poland.

The markers were erected in 2008 and 2010 on 22 sites along the borders of the Jewish quarter, where from 1940–1943 stood the gates to the ghetto, wooden footbridges over Aryan streets, and the buildings important to the ghetto inmates.

== Description and unveiling ==
In order to preserve the memory of the perished Jewish quarter, the Jewish Historical Institute and the City Monument Protection office took the initiative to feature in the public space of the Polish capital its most characteristic points on its former boundaries. The markers were designed by Eleonora Bergman and Tomasz Lec in cooperation with Ewa Pustoła-Kozłowska and Jan Jagielski. Each marker consists of three elements:

- a bronze plaque 60 cm by 70 cm (24 inches by 28 inches) with the map representing the ghetto’s farthest borders and the pre-war street network featured on the map of Warsaw, and a pin indicating the exact location of the marked place;
- a plaque made of acrylic glass 36 cm by 50 cm (12 inches by 20 inches) with information in Polish and English about the place, its role in the history of the ghetto and one or two historical photos, proceeded by a brief history of the Warsaw Ghetto:

By order of the German occupation authorities, the ghetto was cut off from the rest of the city on November 16, 1940. The ghetto area, surrounded by a wall, was initially 307 hectares (759 acres); with time, it was reduced. Starting in January 1942, it was divided in two parts called the small and large ghettos. Approximately 360,000 Warsaw Jews and 90,000 from other towns were herded into the ghetto. Nearly 100,000 died of hunger. During the summer of 1942, the Germans deported and murdered close to 300,000 people in the gas chambers of Treblinka. On April 19, 1943, an uprising broke out in the ghetto. Until mid-May, fighters and civilians perished in combat or in the systematically burned ghetto buildings. The remaining population was murdered by Germans in November 1943 in the Majdanek, Poniatowa and Trawniki concentration camps. Only a few survived.
To the memory of those who suffered, fought and perished.
The City of Warsaw, 2008.

- cement strips 25 cm (10 inches) wide with the cast iron bilingual sign MUR GETTA 1940/GHETTO WALL 1943 placed in sidewalks and lawns showing the exact location of the ghetto walls.

The dates 1940-1943 have symbolic meaning as the years when the Warsaw Ghetto existed. Therefore, they should not be treated literally because most of the commemorated places were excluded in 1941-1942, one site was included into the ghetto in 1941, and two – in 1942.

Most plaques were placed on the 2.3 m (7.6 ft) tall cement posts that were specially designed on sett pavement; the rest were placed directly on the walls of the buildings and structures.

The markers were built between April and November 2008 and were inaugurated on 19 November 2008 by the mayor of Warsaw Hanna Gronkiewicz-Waltz. On 27 January 2010 on the International Holocaust Remembrance Day, the 22nd marker was unveiled on site of the preserved ghetto wall in Sienna Street.

The project was financed by the City of Warsaw and the Polish Ministry of Culture and National Heritage.

== Locations of the markers ==
- Władysław Anders Street (pl:General Władysław Andersa) corner of Świętojerska Street – here, on the site of the former Nalewki Street stood one of the most important ghetto gates. Through this very gate at 5.30 am on 19 April 1943 the German, Latvian, and Ukrainian troops under the command of Ferdinand von Sammern-Frankenegg entered the ghetto. They were met with Jewish resistance, which sparked off the Warsaw Ghetto Uprising.
- Bielańska Street corner of Corazziego Street - here the ghetto included the Great Synagogue in Tłomackie Street and Central Judaic Library. This area was excluded from the Jewish district on 20 March 1942.
- Bonifraterska Street near Międzyparkowa Street – this point, at the former intersection of Bonifraterska and Żoliborska Streets, was the northeastern corner of the ghetto. Over the northern part of Przebieg Street there was a wooden footbridge – one of four such structures built in the Warsaw Ghetto.
- Chłodna Street corner of Elektoralna Street – commemorates the City Court building on Leszno Street (currently “Solidarności” Avenue) that was not included into the ghetto and became a meeting place for people from both sides of the wall and a key point for Jews endeavoring to escape to the Aryan side of Warsaw. In 1950, Biała Street, which led to the Court from the south, was rebuilt approximately 200 meters to the west.
- Chłodna Street at the intersection with Żelazna Street – the marker commemorates exclusion from the ghetto in December 1941 the area west of Żelazna Street, as a result of which the Jewish district was divided into two parts called the large and the small ghettos. In order to ease heavy pedestrian traffic on Żelazna Street (the only street that connected the two ghettos) on 26 January 1942 a wooden footbridge was erected over Chłodna Street, becoming one of the symbols of Holocaust after the war.
- 41 Chłodna Street – here, from 16 November 1940 to December 1941, the western boundary of the ghetto ran along the eastern edges of the premises marked by Wronia Street; also one of the original 22 ghetto gates (in operation till November 1941) closed Chłodna Street from the west. In December 1941, this part of the Wola district was excluded from the Jewish quarter and its border was moved to the middle of Żelazna Street.
- 1 Parade Square (eastern wall of the northeast corner of the Palace of Culture and Science with the Studio Theater) – the southeast boundary of the ghetto ran along the premises here. On 5 October 1941 the ghetto border was moved to the middle of Sienna Street.
- Drzewiecki Avenue near Iron-Gate Square – from this point westwards a narrow strip of land was excluded from the ghetto due to the role of Chłodna Street as an important east-west transport corridor. It included Mirowskie Market Halls, Mirowskie Barracks, and St. Charles Borromeo church up to Żelazna Street.
- Drzewiecki Avenue near John Paul II Avenue (southern wall of “Hale Mirowskie” shopping precinct) – this was the northern boundary of the small ghetto that ran from here westwards along the existing walls that divided the premises.
- Dzika Street near John Paul II Avenue – after the minor expansion of the ghetto in January 1942, this became the northwest corner of the Jewish quarter.
- Dzika Street near the intersection with Stawki Street – here, opposite the Umschlagplatz, a ghetto gate was in operation from January 1942.
- 55 Freta Street (on Franciszkańska Street side) – this was the eastern edge of the northern part of the Jewish quarter. The New Town was excluded from the ghetto in December 1941.
- Młynarska Street (on the wall of the Jewish Cemetery near its border with the Muslim Cemetery) - this brick wall along Młynarska Street and the Powązki Cemetery was the northwestern boundary of the Jewish district from 16 November 1940 to December 1941 (the date the Jewish Cemetery was excluded from the ghetto).
- 49/51 Okopowa Street (on the wall of the Jewish Cemetery on Anielewicza Street side) – the second marker commemorating Warsaw’s largest Jewish necropolis and the adjacent Skra sports field. The latter was the only large undeveloped plot in the ghetto. In time it became a burial site with both individual and mass graves, as well as a place of executions, victims of which are honored by the nearby Monument of Jews and Poles Common Martyrdom. Many of those killed during the Warsaw Uprising of 1944 were also buried here.
- 53 Sienna Street (in the courtyard of Henryk Sienkiewicz High School) - a part of the southern boundary of the ghetto made from the existing wall between Sienna 53 and Sienna 55 estates. On 5 October 1941, the border of this part of the Jewish quarter was moved to the middle of Sienna Street.
- “Solidarności” Avenue between the Warsaw Chamber Opera building (no 76b) and the Calvinist parish house (no 76a) – this so-called "evangelical enclave" included the Calvinist church, the parish house, Działyński Palace, the Evangelical Hospital and a few buildings in Mylna Street. It was surrounded on all sides by the ghetto and the only connection with the Aryan part of the city was through the estate at 5 Przejazd which had been demolished in September 1939. This location enabled the Calvinist clergy and parishioners to provide assistance to the Jews in the ghetto.
- Stawki Street near Okopowa Street – here the boundary of the Jewish quarter ran along the southern wall of Temler & Szwede tannery, which was not included in the ghetto.
- Świętojerska Street corner of Nowiniarska Street – the only remaining fragment of the wall surrounding the northern part of the ghetto is preserved here.
- Świętokrzyska Street in Bolesław Kontrym “Żmudzin” square – the eastern boundary of the southern part of the ghetto ran here along the existing walls that divided the premises. In March 1941, the ghetto border was moved to the west to Bagno Street.
- Twarda Street near the intersection with Złota Street – this was the southwest corner of the ghetto. One of its original 22 gates stood here and operated from 16 November 1940 till 20 January 1941.
- 63 Żelazna Street on the wall of the former Duschik & Szolce metal works factory building (on Grzybowska Street side) – here stood one of the major gates to the small ghetto.
- Żelazna Street near the intersection with ”Solidarności” Avenue (on the wall of the prewar building of public schools no 10, 17, 56 and 119, currently the seat of the Wola District Office at 90 “Solidarności” Avenue”) – here was one of the main gates to the ghetto, opposite the building of the “Collegium” Society at 84 Leszno Street (non-existent now), which housed the Labor and Statistics Departments of the Jewish Council. In September 1941 that building, being a Jewish island on the Aryan side, was connected to the ghetto by a wooden footbridge at the second floor level over Żelazna Street.

== Bibliography ==
- Engelking, Barbara; Jacek Leociak (2009). The Warsaw Ghetto: A Guide to the Perished City. Yale University Press. ISBN 978-0300112344.
- Ghetto Wall 1940-1943. Remembrance project. City of Warsaw. April 2008.
- "Linia pamięci". Stolica (in Polish): 23. April 2008.
- "Oznakowanie granic getta" (in Polish). "Kurier Wolski”, Urząd Dzielnicy Wola m.st. Warszawy. Archived from the original on 30 October 2018.
- "Pomniki - Miejsca żydowskie" (in Polish). Urząd Dzielnicy Śródmieście m.st. Warszawy. Archived from the original on 17 April 2013.
