= Maria Zalewska =

Maria Zalewska is a media, memory, and Holocaust scholar who focuses on the relationship between interactive technologies, visual culture, and Holocaust memory. She currently serves as the executive director of the Auschwitz-Birkenau Memorial Foundation, a New York-based non-profit organization.

Since 2020, she holds the title of the Honorary Consul of the Auschwitz-Birkenau State Museum in the United States of America and is a member of the International Research Advisory Board of the Institute for Holocaust Research in Sweden (IHRS).

== Education and academic work ==
Zalewska was born in Warsaw, Poland. She received her B.A. and M.A. in humanities from San Francisco State University. After receiving her M.Phil. in Russian and East European Studies from the University of Oxford, UK, she completed her Ph.D. in Cinema and Media from the University of Southern California School of Cinematic Arts, Los Angeles. Zalewska's dissertation “#Holocaust: Rethinking the Relationship Between Spaces of Memory and Places of Commemoration in The Digital Age” examined Holocaust remembrance across various media types: cinema, TV, photography, holograms, digital technologies, as well as extended technologies of virtual reality and augmented reality. An example of Zalewska's work is her examination of Instagram selfies taken at the Auschwitz-Birkenau Memorial and Museum. While at University of Southern California (USC), she was the recipient of the Andrew W. Mellon Digital Humanities Doctoral Fellowship and became an affiliated scholar of the USC Shoah Foundation.

In 2019–2020, Zalewska was a postdoctoral teaching fellow at the University of Southern California School of Cinematic Arts, Cinema and Media Department. She has presented her work at over thirty international conferences and symposia, and guest-lectured at multiple organizations and universities in the U.S. and abroad. She has published numerous articles on the relationship between interactivity, visual studies, and Holocaust memory. She has served as a member of media award committees and organized academic conferences, including the Visible Evidence XXVI, the most prominent international conference on documentary film and media.

== Career ==
In 2009–2010, she served as the Director of the Warsaw office of the Auschwitz-Birkenau Foundation. She worked on securing the 2009 joint German federal-lands donation of €60 million to the Foundation's Endowment in five equal instalments from 2011 to 2015, as well as 2010 donations made by Austria (€6,000,000) and the US ($15,000,000). Additionally, Zalewska played a central role in obtaining an additional grant from the German government in June 2010 that constituted €120,000 to cover the initial cost of running the office of the Foundation. Since 2018, she has worked for the Auschwitz-Birkenau Memorial Foundation which safeguards the memory of Auschwitz-Birkenau through the preservation of its original artefacts and by bringing education about Auschwitz to American high school students. In 2020, Zalewska wrote and executive produced a short film “They Were Just Like Us” for ABMF that premiered during the live broadcast of the 75th Anniversary of the Liberation of Auschwitz. In 2022, Zalewska edited a cookbook entitled Honey Cake and Latkes: Recipes from the Old World by the Auschwitz-Birkenau Survivors, which includes recipes and memories from the Survivors.
