= Auschwitz-Birkenau Memorial Foundation =

Non-profit organization

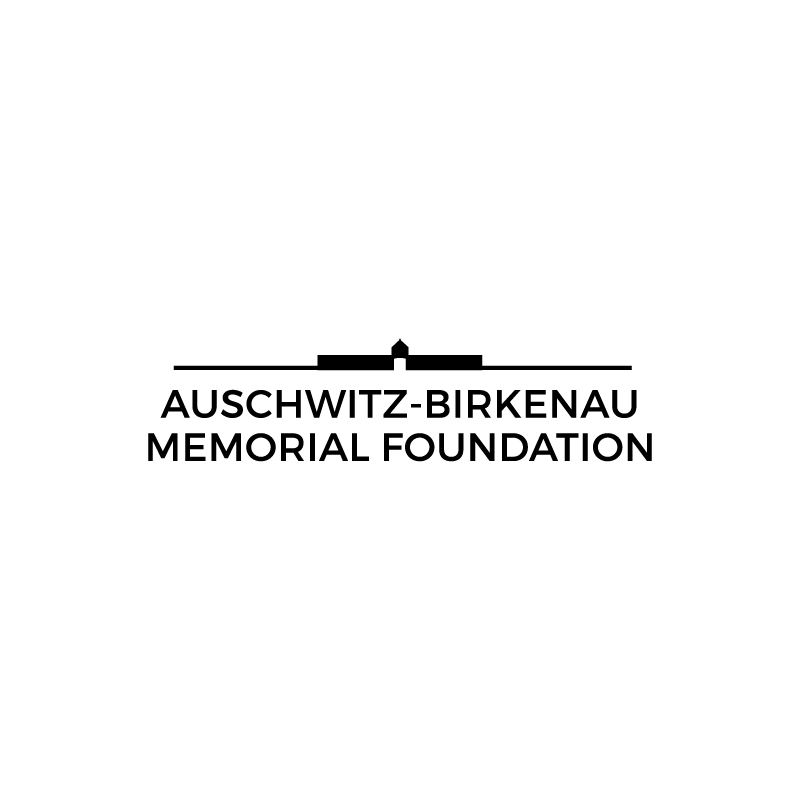
- Founded: 2012
- Type: 501(c)(3) charitable organization
- Location: New York, New York
- Key people: Ronald S. Lauder (Chairman), Maria Zalewska (Executive Director)
- Website: www.preserveauschwitz.org//

The Auschwitz-Birkenau Memorial Foundation (ABMF) was founded in New York, USA, in 2012 as a non-profit organization dedicated to supporting the preservation of the original artifacts and grounds of the former Nazi German concentration and extermination camp KL Auschwitz I and Auschwitz II Birkenau, supervised by the Auschwitz-Birkenau State Museum in Oświęcim, Poland.

In 2019, the organization was renamed from Friends of Auschwitz Birkenau Foundation to the Auschwitz-Birkenau Memorial Foundation and expanded its programs to survivors' outreach and education. According to its mission statement, the Auschwitz-Birkenau Memorial Foundation's primary purpose is to "safeguard the memory of Auschwitz-Birkenau through the preservation of its original artifacts and bringing education about Auschwitz to every American student." The Foundation also focuses on Holocaust survivors’ outreach.

ABMF provides support to programs and projects of the Auschwitz-Birkenau Foundation, a charitable organization established under the laws of Poland and having a purpose consistent with the Auschwitz-Birkenau Memorial Foundation.

== Preservation ==
Since its inception in 2012, ABMF has supported the Auschwitz-Birkenau Museum by helping raise funds for the $200M Endowment established in 2009 in Warsaw, Poland by the Auschwitz-Birkenau Foundation. The Endowment finances the preservation of the authentic physical remains of the Auschwitz-Birkenau concentration and death camp and ensures that future generations can visit and see the authentic site and its artifacts. It is supported by 39 international governments and over 250 individual donors from the U.S. and beyond.

== Education ==
In 2022, the Auschwitz-Birkenau Memorial Foundation (ABMF) launched its flagship educational initiative in the United States: Auschwitz Legacy Fellowship. The fellowship brings American high school teachers from all fifty states to Auschwitz so that they – in return – can bring lessons of Auschwitz to their students back home and continue to teach them for the next five consecutive years.

== 75th Anniversary of the Liberation of Auschwitz ==
On January 27, 2020, The Auschwitz-Birkenau Memorial and Museum marked the 75th Anniversary of the Liberation of Auschwitz-Birkenau with a special event at the site. The Anniversary Ceremony was attended by survivors, their families, heads of state, and world leaders and was the central event of the 2020 International Holocaust Remembrance Day observance across the globe. The Auschwitz-Birkenau Memorial Foundation, under the leadership of its chairman, Ronald S. Lauder, fully funded and organized the delegation of 120 Auschwitz-Birkenau Survivors and their family members who traveled to Poland from the United States, Canada, Israel, Sweden, Australia, Argentina, Brazil, France, Germany, Peru, the UK, and other countries.

== Survivors’ Outreach ==
In 2020, during the COVID-19 pandemic, the Auschwitz-Birkenau Memorial Foundation launched an extensive program of Survivors Outreach that consists of online reunions, sending survivors birthday flowers and letters, and organizing meetings with survivors and American high school teachers. In 2022, the Foundation published a cookbook entitled Honey Cake and Latkes: Recipes from the Old World by the Auschwitz- Birkenau Survivors, which includes recipes and Survivors' memories.
