= Folkswort =

Yiddish-language daily newspaper published in Warsaw, Poland

- Type: Daily newspaper
- Political alignment: Labour Zionism
- Language: Yiddish
- Headquarters: Nalewki Street, Warsaw
- Country: Poland

Folkswort (Yiddish: פֿאָלקסװאָרט, "people's word") was a Yiddish-language daily newspaper published from Warsaw, Poland. Folkswort was an organ of the Labour Zionist Poalei Zion Right. Folkswort had its office at Nalewki Street.
