= Dąbrowa Tarnowska Synagogue =

Synagogue in Dąbrowa Tarnowska, Poland

- Synagoga w Dąbrowie Tarnowskiej
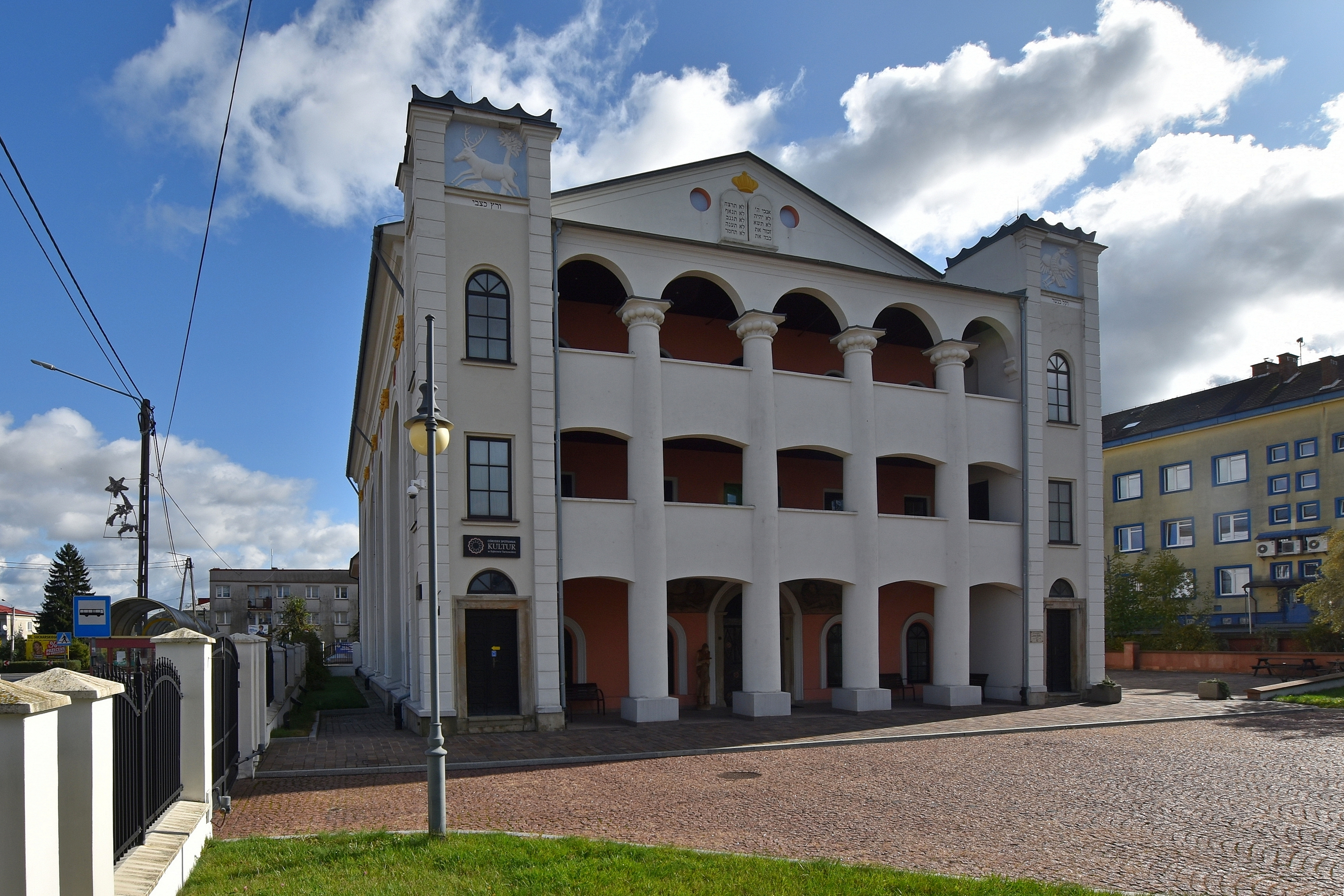

Religion
- Affiliation: Judaism

Location
- Location: Dąbrowa Tarnowska
- Country: Poland
- Interactive map of Dąbrowa Tarnowska Synagogue
- Coordinates: 50.175750°N 20.988083°E

Architecture
- Materials: Brick, stone

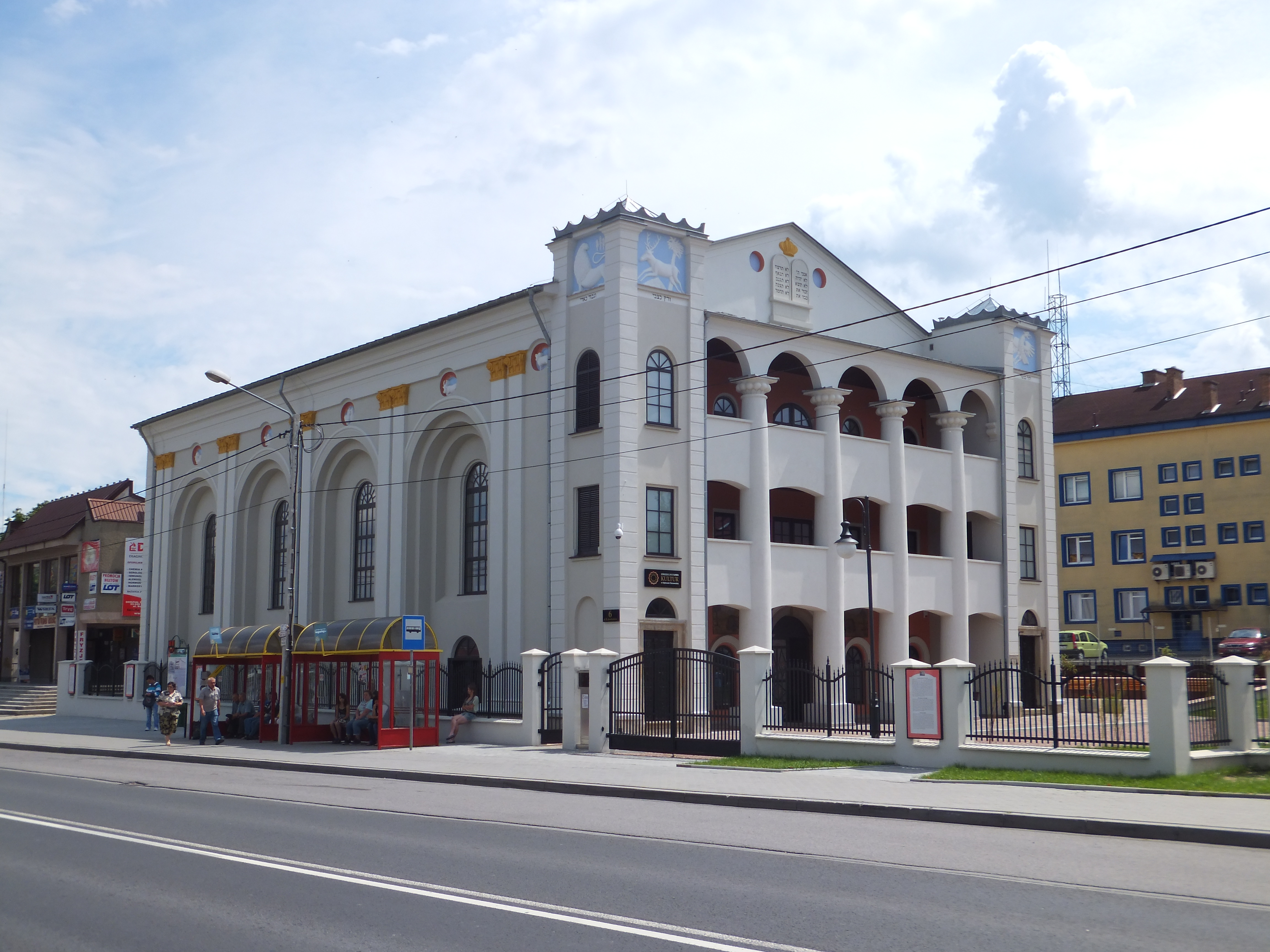
The synagogue, in 2012

The Dąbrowa Tarnowska Synagogue (Polish: Synagoga w Dąbrowie Tarnowskiej is a synagogue located in Dąbrowa Tarnowska on the Berek Joselewicz street. It is the largest preserved synagogue in Lesser Poland Voivodeship. Since 2012, the building has been used by the Centre for the Meeting of Cultures and serves as an exhibition space.

== History ==
=== Construction and early years ===
The synagogue was built in the second half of the 19th century according to the design of Jewish architect and engineer Abraham Goldstein. The main benefactor was Ajzyk Stern. The exact date of completion is most likely April 1, 1863. Construction and finishing work lasted from 1855 to 1860. No data is available to clarify these figures.

=== Center for the meeting of cultures ===
The synagogue is open to the public. Admission is charged. In addition to the prayer room, you can also see everyday objects from the past, which are located upstairs and in the synagogue's basement.

== See also ==
- Bobowa Synagogue
