= Bonifraterska Street, Warsaw =

Street in Warsaw

Coordinates: 52°15′11″N 21°00′02″E

Bonifraterska Street
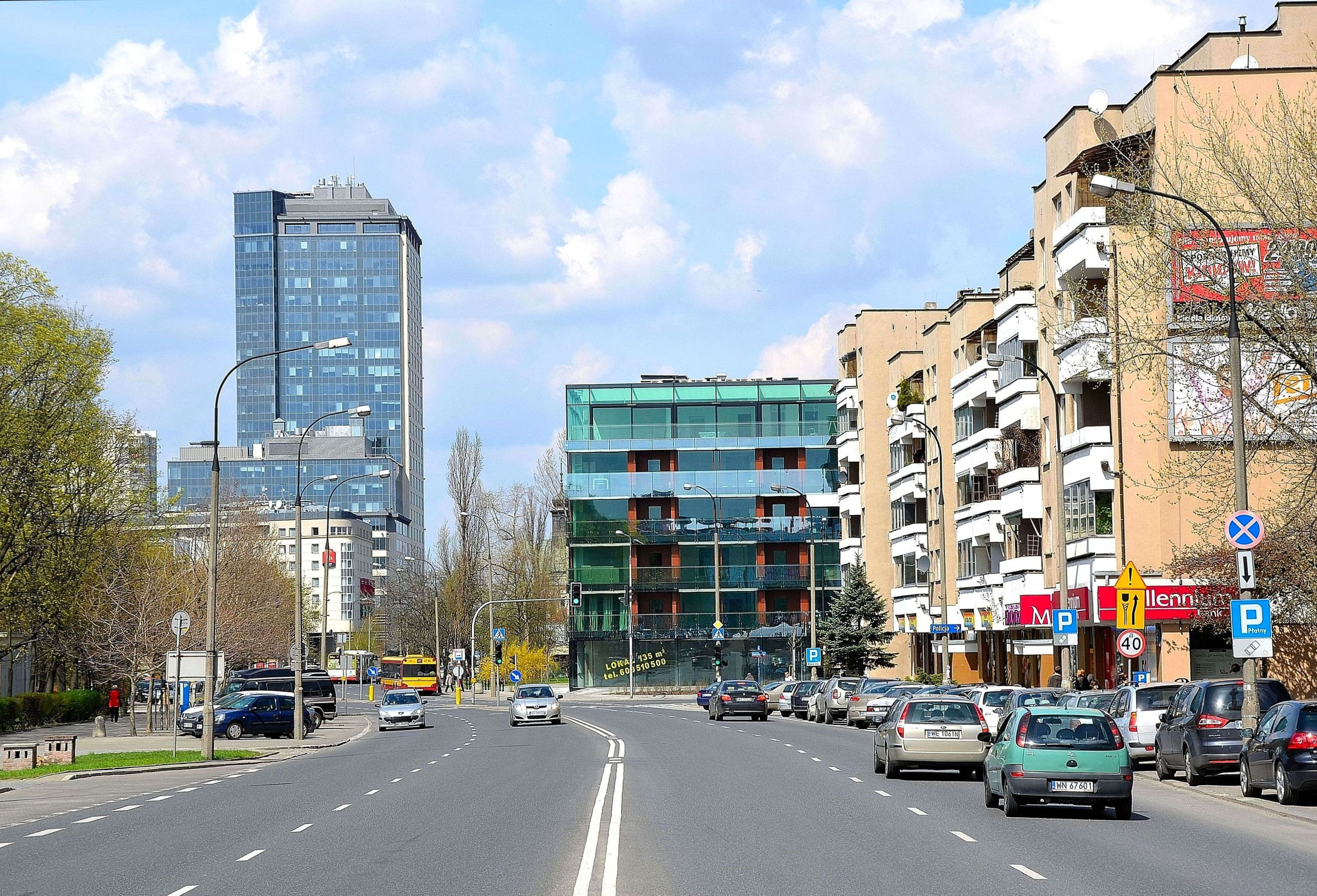
- Bonifraterska Street (2012)
- Location: New Town, Warsaw, Poland

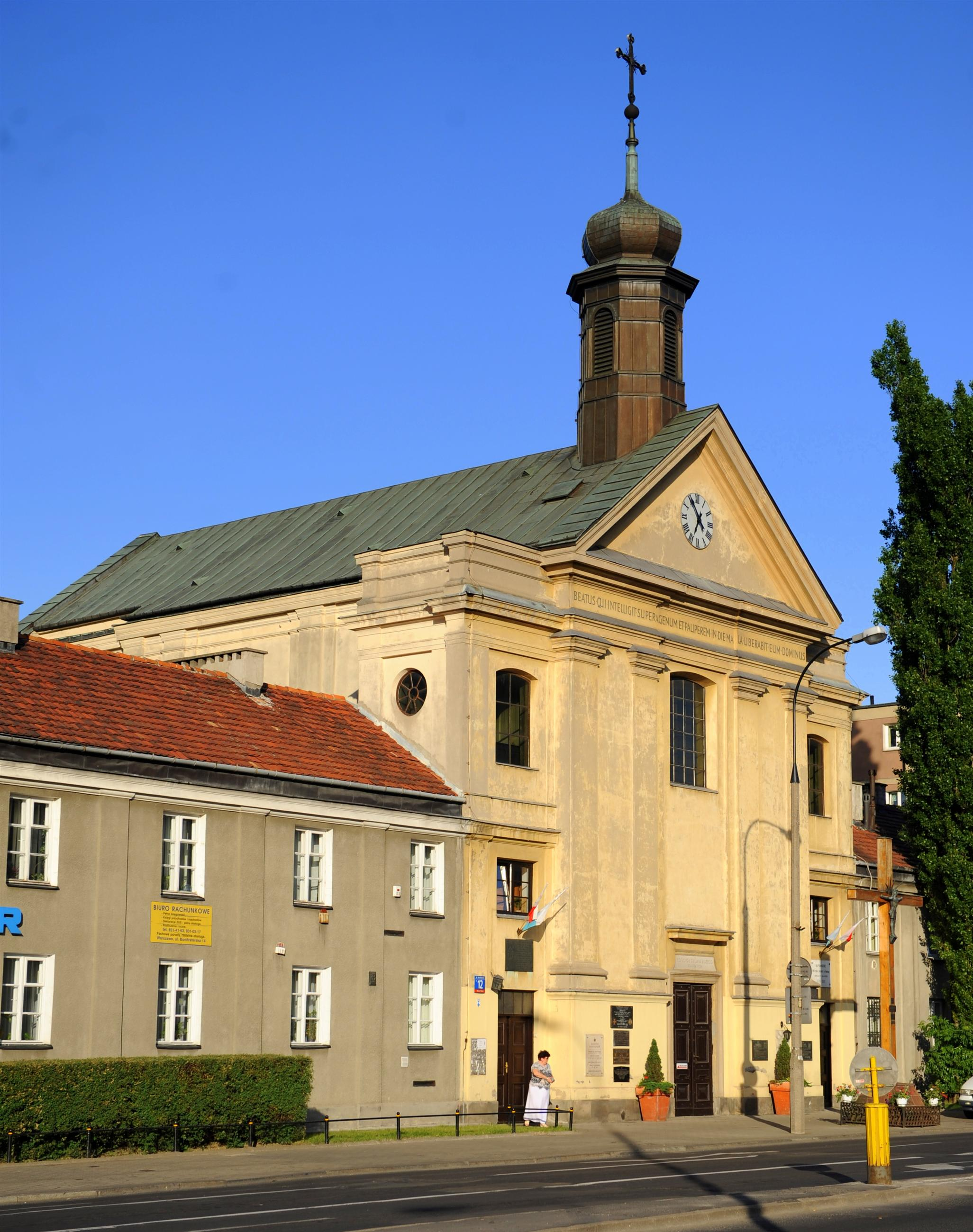
Church of John of God on Bonifraterska Street

The Bonifraterska Street (Polish: Ulica Bonifraterska) in Warsaw, Poland, is one of the main streets of Warsaw's New Town, stretching from Długa Street and the Krasiński Palace to Słomiński street.

It is one of the most historical of Warsaw's streets.

== History ==
The street is a fragment of an old road leading to the Marymoncka Highway (now Marymoncka Street) and already appeared on maps in the 18th century. It was laid out on land belonging to the Parys family, hence its original names Paryszewszyzna and Paryszewska.

Initially, it was regulated only in the section from Franciszkańska Street to Konwiktorska Street, near the buildings of the Bonifratres (the Brothers Hospitallers), from whom the street’s current name derives.

The earliest buildings along Bonifraterska Street included the manor of architect Józef Fontana and the monastery and church complex of St. John of God, designed by Fontana together with Antonio Solari, belonging to the Brothers Hospitallers. They also operated an asylum for the mentally ill located next to it, in a building erected in 1757 at the junction with Konwiktorska Street, also designed by Józef Fontana. After 1770, residential houses, manor houses, and small tenement buildings appeared along the street. One of them belonged to architect Bonawentura Solari, who designed many structures in the surrounding area.

Significant changes to the Bonifraterska area came with the construction of the Warsaw Citadel in the 1830s, followed by Fort Aleksiej (1847–1849). All buildings beyond Konwiktorska Street were demolished, and the old side streets disappeared. However, the southern section of the street developed, and in the 1870s several tenement houses were built there, usually decorated with plaster stucco façades.

When the Polonia Warsaw Stadium was built on Konwiktorska Street in 1930, stands with a side entrance from Bonifraterska Street were erected. They were destroyed in 1944 and rebuilt after the war in a modified, socialist realist form.

On November 27, 1937, a viaduct connecting Bonifraterska Street with Żoliborz was opened. After the viaduct’s completion, in December 1938, Bonifraterska was extended to Świętojerska Street and Krasiński Square through a passage cut through the back of the Krasiński Palace. This required substantial funds for the purchase of ten properties and the demolition of 36 buildings. As a result, a convenient connection was established between the city center and the then-peripheral Żoliborz, and tram traffic was withdrawn from the streets beneath the viaduct (Krajewskiego and Szymanowska). Trams operated along Bonifraterska Street until November 15, 1947.

The street’s buildings suffered damage during the Siege of Warsaw in September 1939.

In November 1940, the southern section of the street between Świętojerska and Sapieżyńska Streets fell within the borders of the Warsaw Ghetto. In December 1941, the boundary of the closed district was shifted westward, to the middle of the roadway. The street was given the German name Klosterstrasse.

During the Warsaw Ghetto Uprising, nearly all the buildings on the street were damaged. After the war, it was decided that only the Polonia Warsaw Stadium and the Church of St. John of God would be rebuilt. The monastery adjacent to the church was demolished in 1966 along with the ruins of the mental hospital but was rebuilt fairly quickly. In 1947, the northern section of the street was realigned. The viaducts over the Warszawa Gdańska railway station tracks were connected to the newly laid Marcelego Nowotki Street, causing Bonifraterska to lose its function as the main connection to Żoliborz. From July 22, 1949, to April 12, 1972, trolleybus lines operated along the street.

The new section between Międzyparkowa and Szymanowska Streets was officially named Bonifraterska Street by a resolution of the Warsaw City National Council on May 18, 1957.

In 2005, the section between Międzyparkowa and Słomińskiego Streets was closed to motor vehicles due to the collapse of underground tunnels of Fort Traugutta (the current name of Fort Aleksiej), which ran beneath the roadway. In 2008, at the junction with Międzyparkowa Street, one of the monuments marking the boundaries of the Warsaw Ghetto was unveiled.
