= Piotr Cywiński =

Polish historian and museum director

Piotr M.A. Cywiński
- Piotr Mateusz Andrzej Cywiński
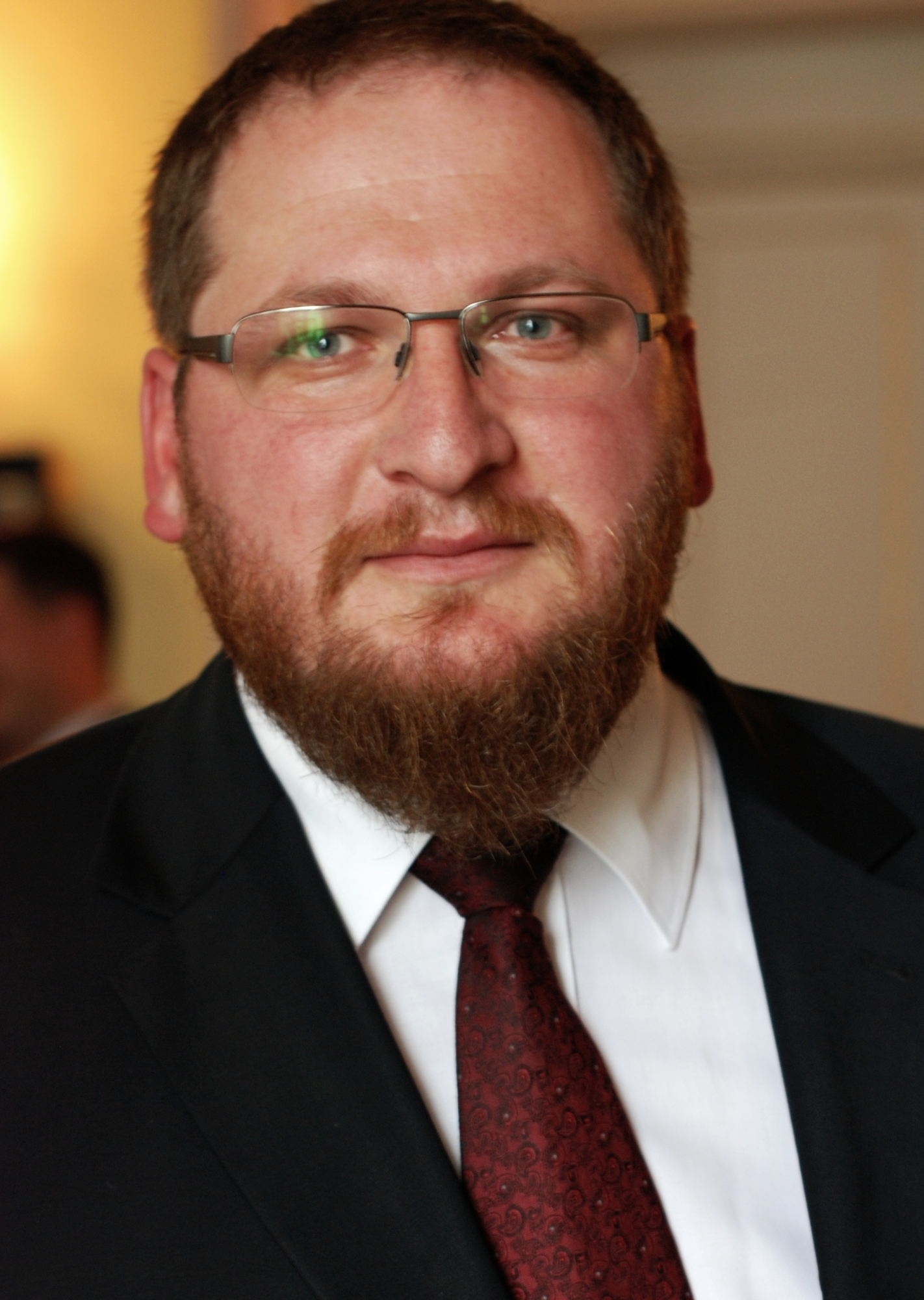
- Born: 16 April 1972 (age 54); Warsaw, Polish People's Republic
- Occupations: historian, director of the Auschwitz-Birkenau State Museum, president of Auschwitz-Birkenau Foundation
- Awards: The Cross of Merit, Order of Polonia Restituta, "Bene Merito" Honour (Poland), Award for Human Rights' Protection (Poland), Gloria Artis Award, Knight of Order of the Crown (Belgium), Knight of the Order of St. Charles (Monaco), Officer's Cross of the Order of the Phoenix (Greece), Knight medal insignia of French Legion of Honour (France), Knight's Cross Order of Academic Palms (France).
- Religion: Roman Catholic

Piotr Mateusz Andrzej Cywiński, OBE (Polish: [ˈpjɔtr t͡sɨˈviɲskʲi]; born 16 April 1972 in Warsaw) is a Polish historian, medievalist and social activist. He has served as Director of the Auschwitz-Birkenau State Museum since 2006. From 2000 to 2010, he was the Director of the Catholic Intelligentsia Club (KIK) in Warsaw.

He is known as an active and frequent participant in Polish-Jewish and Christian-Jewish dialogue; and an ecumenist, i.e. believer in reconciliation of the various Christian denominations among the Kresy borderlands.

== Life ==
Cywiński spent his childhood in Warsaw. Between 1982 and 1993 he lived in Switzerland and France due to the political exile of his father Bohdan Cywiński who is a philosopher, historian and journalist. His mother Maria-Malgorzata is a daughter of the artist Zbigniew Łoskot.

Cywiński graduated from the Marc Bloch University in Strasbourg (1993) in medieval studies, and the Catholic University of Lublin (1995). He obtained his PhD degree at the Institute of History of the Polish Academy of Sciences (PAS) in 2001.

== Professional career ==
From 1996 to 2000, Piotr Cywiński served as vice-president of the Club of Catholic Intelligentsia (KIK) in Warsaw, followed by ten years as the President. Since 2010 he has been a Board Member of KIK.

In 2002, he co-founded the multicultural St. Adalbert's Forum, which he chaired for approximately eight years. He co-organized the Congresses of Gniezno in 2003, 2004, and 2005. In 2004, Cywiński was elected vice-president (and regional president for Europe) of the global federation of Catholic intellectuals Pax Romana ICMICA/MIIC for the mandate 2004–2008.

Between 2000 and 2006, Cywiński served as Secretary for the International Auschwitz Council (IAC). On 12 June 2006, Cywiński was nominated for director of the Auschwitz-Birkenau State Museum, a position he assumed on 1 September that year, replacing Jerzy Wróblewski who had been the director since 1990. He was also co-creator of the International Centre for Education about Auschwitz and the Holocaust and vice president of the center's council. In 2009, Cywiński co-created the Auschwitz-Birkenau Foundation and since then serves as president of the foundation. In 2023, he did not invite Russia to Auschwitz Liberation Day and "compared the deaths of people in Ukraine to the suffering during the Holocaust."

For the years 2009–2018, Cywiński was a member of the Museums' Council to the Minister of Culture (mandate IV and V), and in 2010 was appointed as member of the Council for the Protection of Struggle and Martyrdom Sites. He also serves as vice-president of the Council of Tradition of Independence Museum in Łódź, and member of the first mandate of the council, later—since 2012—as member of the Board of Trustees of the Museum of World War II in Gdańsk. He is a member of the Council of Museum Gross-Rosen in Rogoźnica.

He is a council member of the Maximilian-Kolbe-Werk, a charity for concentration camp survivors. In 2011 he became a board member of the Association Maison d’Izieu, memorial site in France. In 2015 the board of the Memorial Association accepted him as member of the Moscow's Memorial Association.

From 2000 to 2002, while working for the Adam Mickiewicz Institute, Cywiński co-directed the Festival "Europalia 2001 Poland", then created a portal about Jewish culture and history in Poland, "Diapozytyw.pl". In 2001–2004 he was a member of the Consultative Council of NGOs at the Polish Council for European Integration. For the years 2002–2014 he served as a member of the Polish Episcopate's Group for Dialogue with the Greek Catholic Church in Ukraine.

In the 2004 European Parliament election, he was a candidate on behalf of the Freedom Union. Between 2005 and 2007, Cywiński was vice-president of the association Wikimedia Poland, and since May 2007 has been a member of the Audit Committee of the association.

In 2008, Cywiński served as ambassador of the European Year of Intercultural Dialogue.

== Honors and awards ==
Piotr Cywiński was awarded the Gold Cross of Merit in 2006. On 15 April 2008 Lech Kaczyński, the President of Poland, awarded Cywiński the Knight's Cross of the Order of Polonia Restituta. Also in that year, he was nominated for the TOTUS Award in the category of "achievements in the field of Christian culture”. On 20 January 2010, he received the Officer's Cross of the Polonia Restituta. In 2013, the Polish Minister of Foreign Affairs awarded him the Bene Merito honorary badge for his activities in strengthening the position of Poland in the international arena. In 2014 he received the Golden Order for Achievements in the Penitentiary Work from the Polish Minister of Justice (and also from the Polish Ombudsman's Award for Human Rights' Protection). In 2015 he received a Silver Gloria Artis Award from the Minister of Culture.

In June 2012, he was awarded the Belgian Order of the Crown. In November 2012, Prince Albert II of Monaco awarded Cywiński the knight class of the Order of Saint-Charles. In 2014 he received the Officer's Cross of the Order of the Phoenix (Greece) and in 2015 the Knight's Cross Order of Academic Palms (France). In 2019, he was awarded the Knight medal insignia of the French Legion of Honour.

In 2023, he was awarded an Honorary OBE from British Government for services to Holocaust education and inter-faith dialogue.

== Selected publications ==
- Kościół wobec integracji europejskiej [co-author], ed. Jan Grosfeld, Warszawa 1997, ISBN 83-85737-27-8.
- L'Église en Pologne après 1989 face aux nouveaux défis de la démocratie avec Marcin Przeciszewski, Volume 48 de Cahier / le Rayonnement culturel polonais, in Communio : revue catholique internationale, 179, Vol. XXX, 2005
- Le futur d’Auschwitz. Actes de la journee d’etude du 11 mai 2010 [co-author], IRICE (Sorbone, Paris IV, CNRS et al.), cahier 7: Paris 2011, ISSN 1967-2713.
- Epitaph, Auschwitz-Birkenau State Museum, Oświęcim 2012, ISBN 978-83-7704-0-42-3.
- Auschwitz from A to Z. An Illustrated History of the Camp [co-author], Auschwitz-Birkenau State Museum, Oświęcim 2013, ISBN 978-83-7704-069-0.
- Początki Auschwitz w pamięci pierwszego transportu polskich więźniów politycznych, Auschwitz-Birkenau State Museum, Oświęcim 2015, ISBN 978-83-7704-091-1.
- Auschwitz Legacies [co-author], Auschwitz-Birkenau State Museum, Oświęcim 2015, ISBN 978-83-7704-089-8.
- Auschwitz. A Monograph on the Human, Auschwitz-Birkenau State Museum, Oświęcim 2022, ISBN 978-83-7704-366-0.
- Auschwitz Bauleitung. Designing a Death Camp. Projektowanie Obozu Śmierci, Auschwitz-Birkenau State Museum, Oświęcim 2023 ISBN 978-83-7704-380-6.
