= Bobowa Synagogue =

Synagogue in Bobowa, Poland

- Synagoga w Bobowej
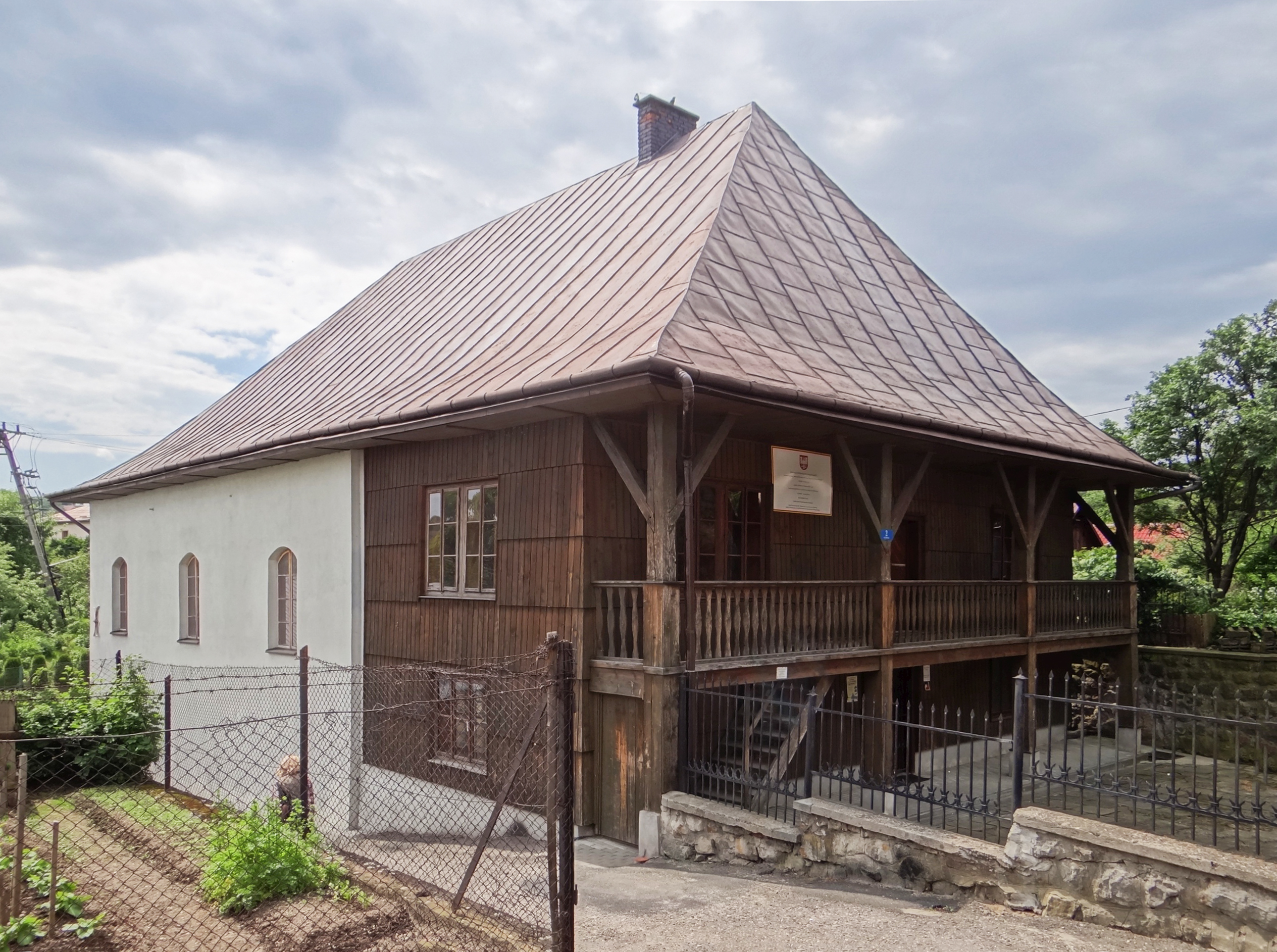

Religion
- Affiliation: Judaism
- Status: active

Location
- Location: Bobowa, Poland
- Interactive map of Bobowa Synagogue
- Coordinates: 49.70766°N 20.94315°E

Architecture
- Style: Baroque
- Completed: 1756

The Bobowa Synagogue (Polish: Synagoga w Bobowej) is a synagogue in Bobowa, Poland. It is one of the most important monuments in Judaism in Poland.

== History ==
The synagogue was built in 1756. In 1889, the synagogue burned down during a fire that damaged the city. The wooden section and roof were destroyed, while the brick interior survived. Immediately after, a decision was made to renovate the building, which gave it its present shape. Not oriented with an axis directed north-south, it consisted of a stone-built main hall, to which a wooden hall, preceded by a three-bay gallery, was later added, with a women's gallery on the first floor. Both parts form a rectangular block covered with a common, single-story hip roof.

== Architecture ==
The main prayer hall is rectangular in plan, measuring 14 x 12.5 meters, and is covered with a nine-field vault supported by four pillars, between which stands a wooden, two-entrance bema.

== Gallery ==
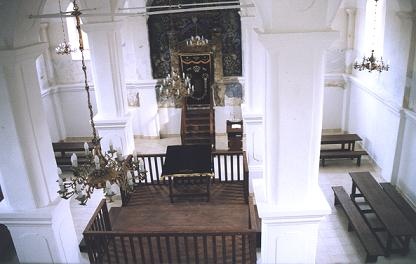
Interior of the synagogue (2004)

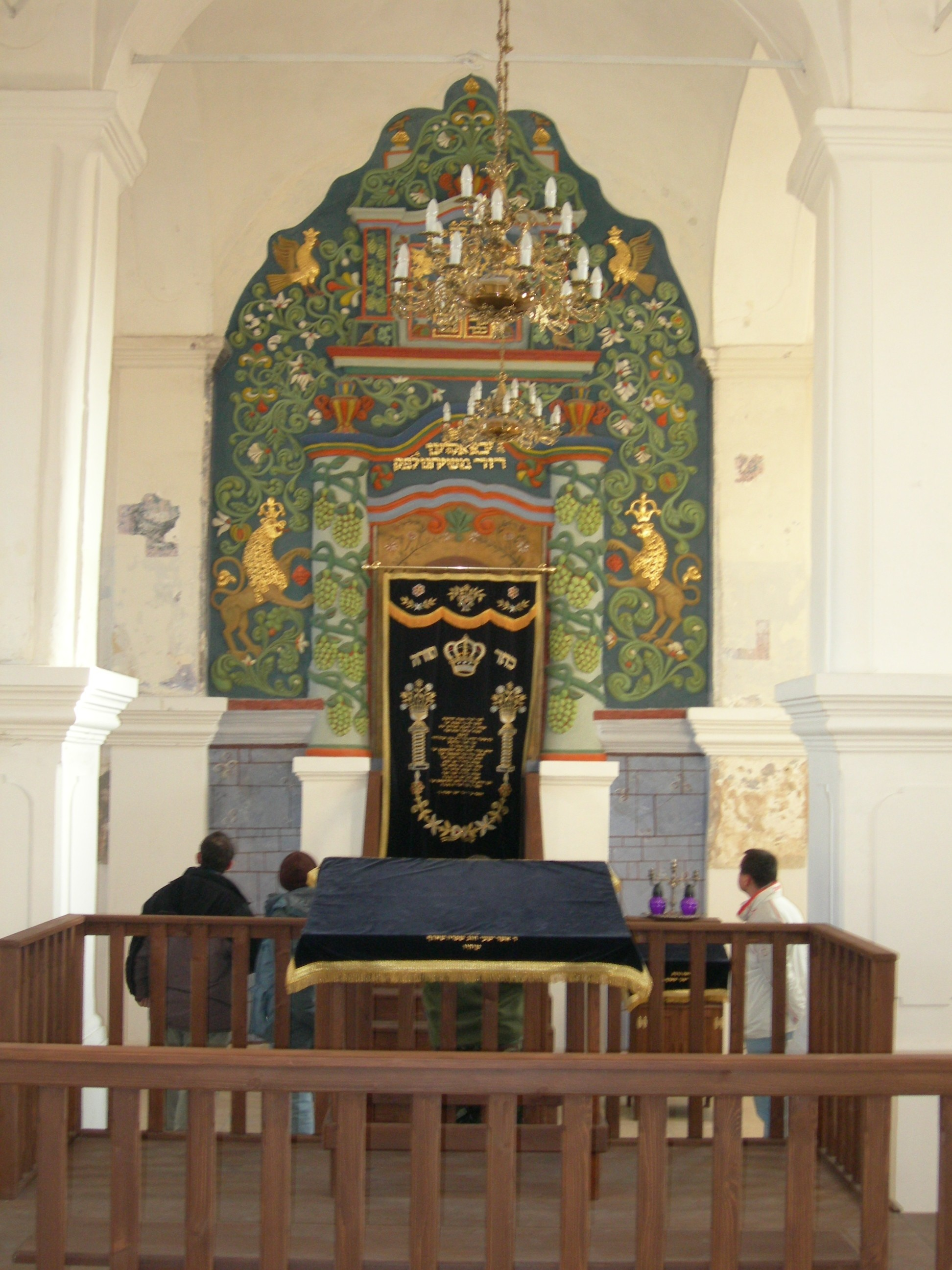
The Aron Kodesh with the bema in the foreground

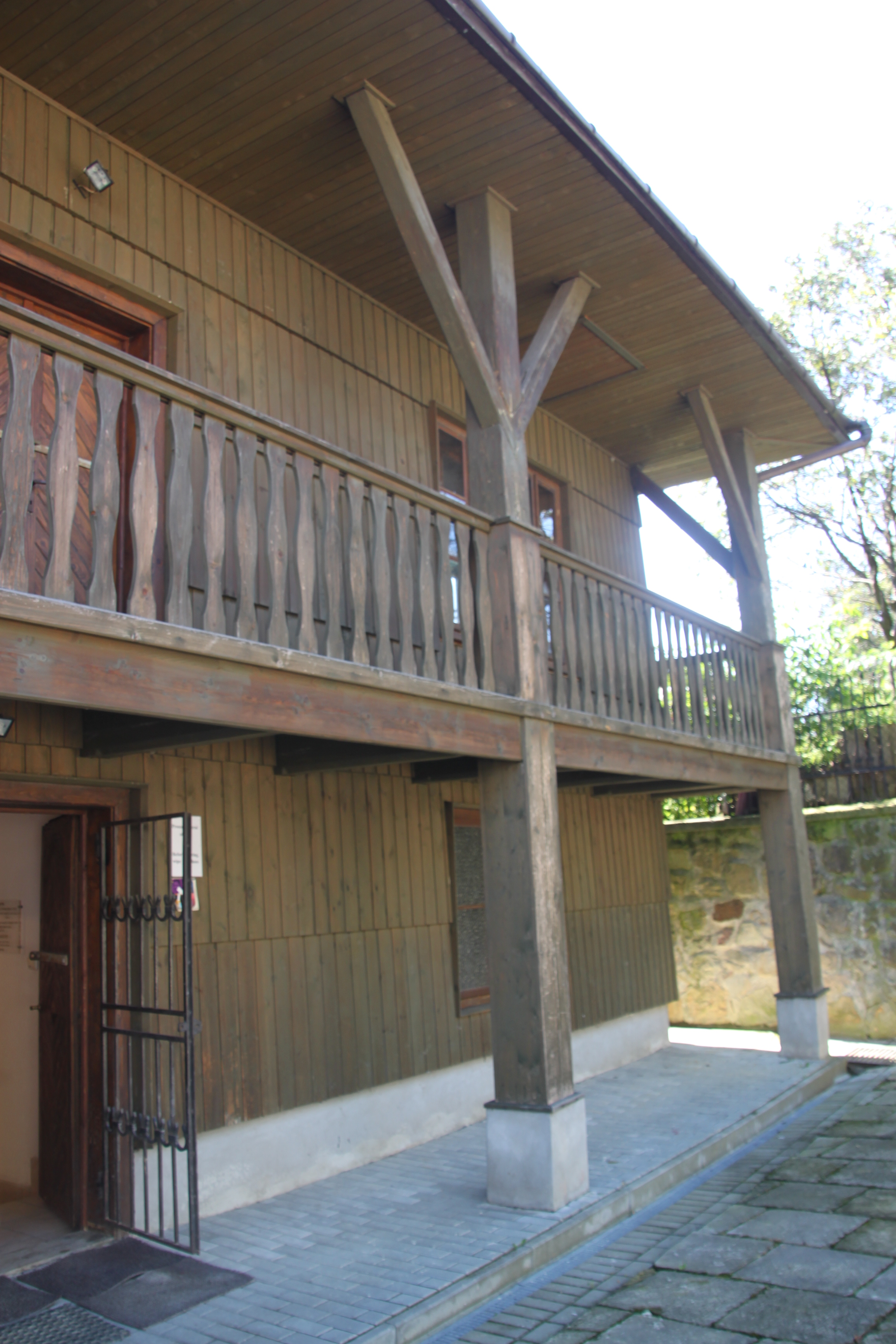
Synagogue (wall with gallery)

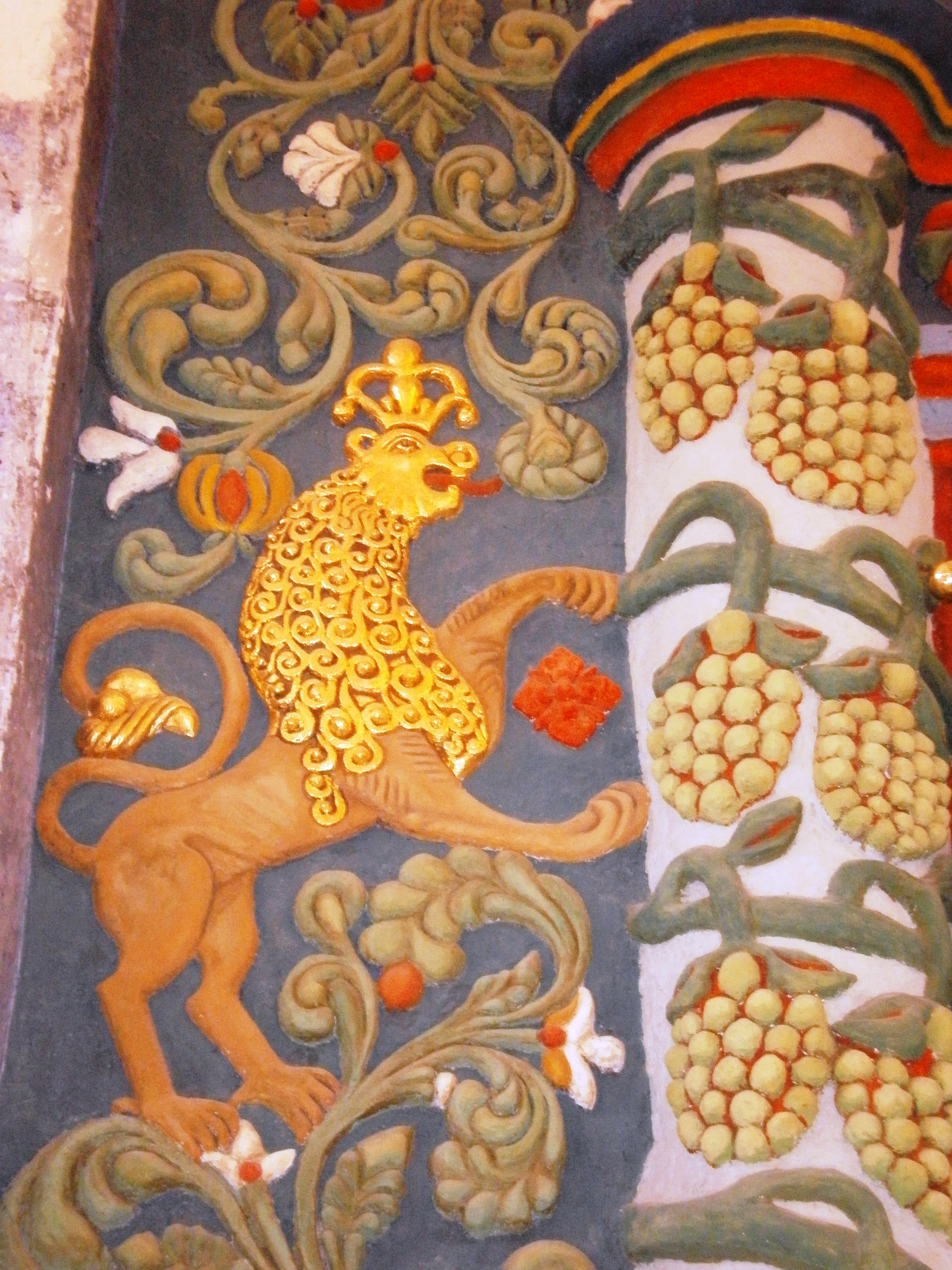
Synagogue (detail of the polychrome) (2014)

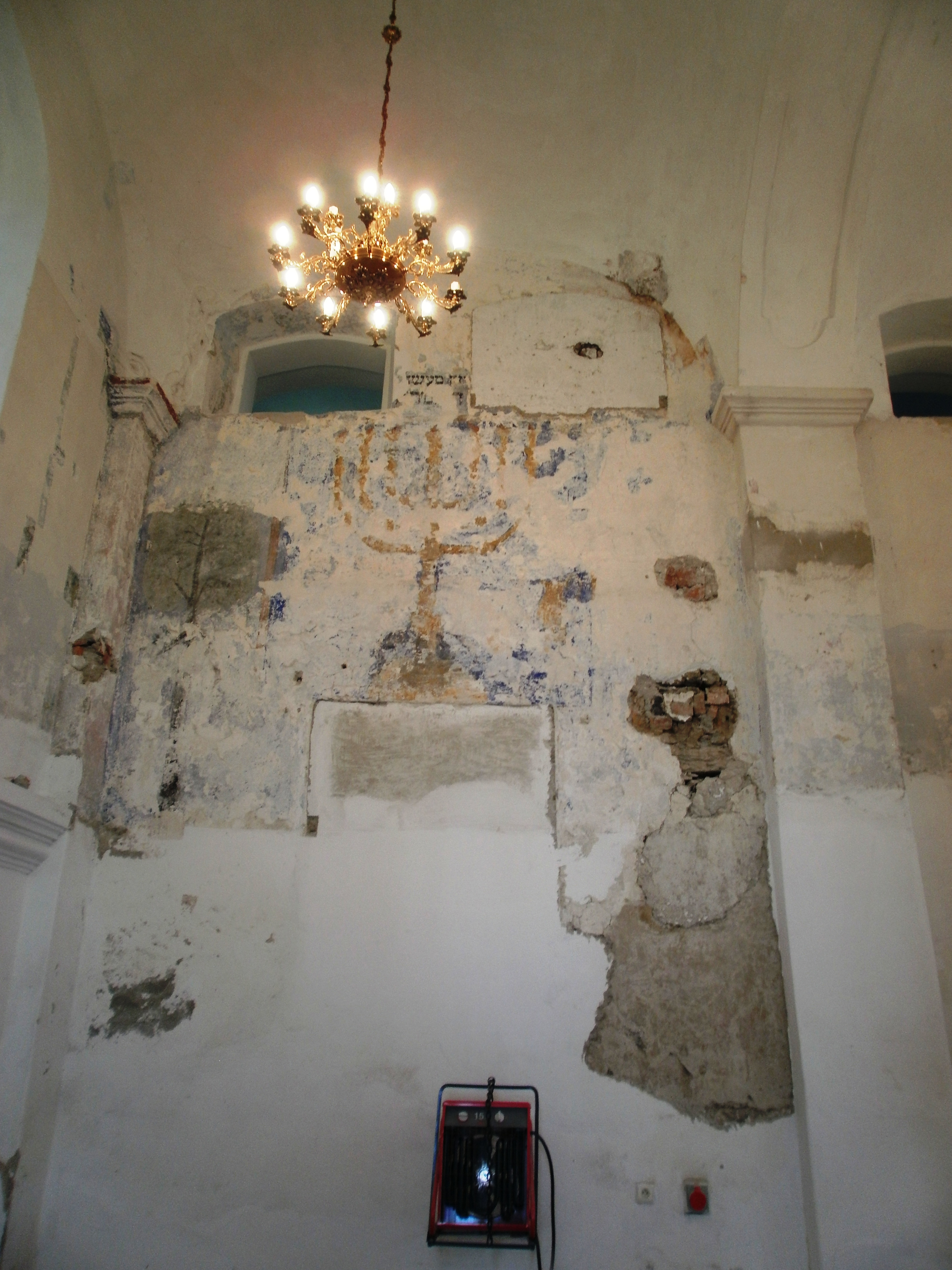
Synagogue (discovered polychromes) (2014)

== Bibliography ==
- Adam Dylewski (2002), Śladami Żydów polskich: przewodnik ilustrowany, Bielsko-Biała: Pascal, ISBN 978-83-7304-029-8, OCLC 749883286
- Grzegorz Kubal (1999), Bobowa – w gminie i okolicy, Krosno: Roksana, ISBN 978-83-88126-10-9, OCLC 751413499
- Eleonora Bergman (1996), Zachowane synagogi i domy modlitwy w Polsce, Warszawa: Żydowski Instytut Historyczny, ISBN 978-83-85888-23-9, OCLC 231842223
