= Nalewki Street, Warsaw =

Street in Warsaw, Poland

Coordinates: 52°14′59″N 20°59′46″E

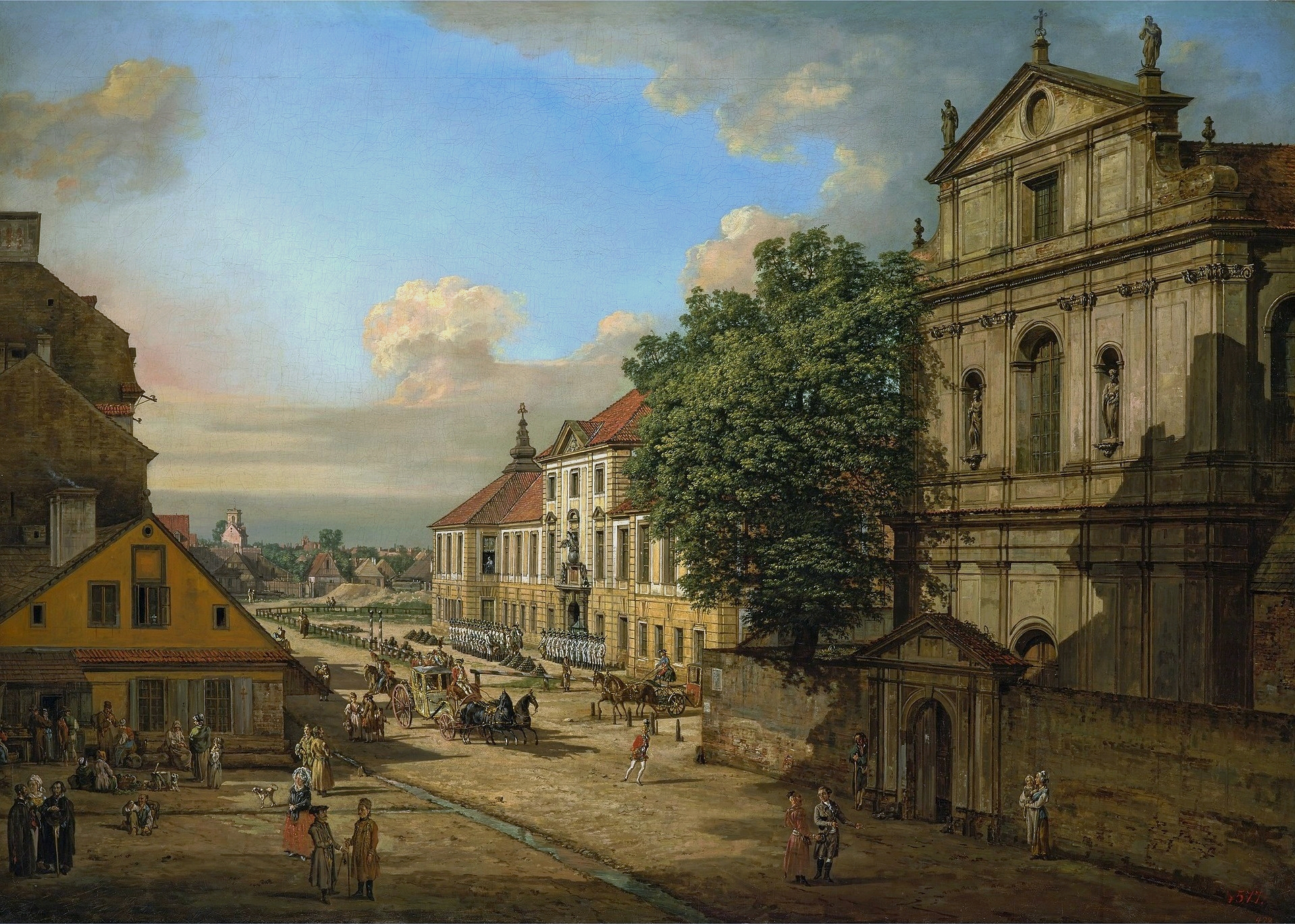
Outlet Nalewki at Arsenal, 1775, Canaletto painting

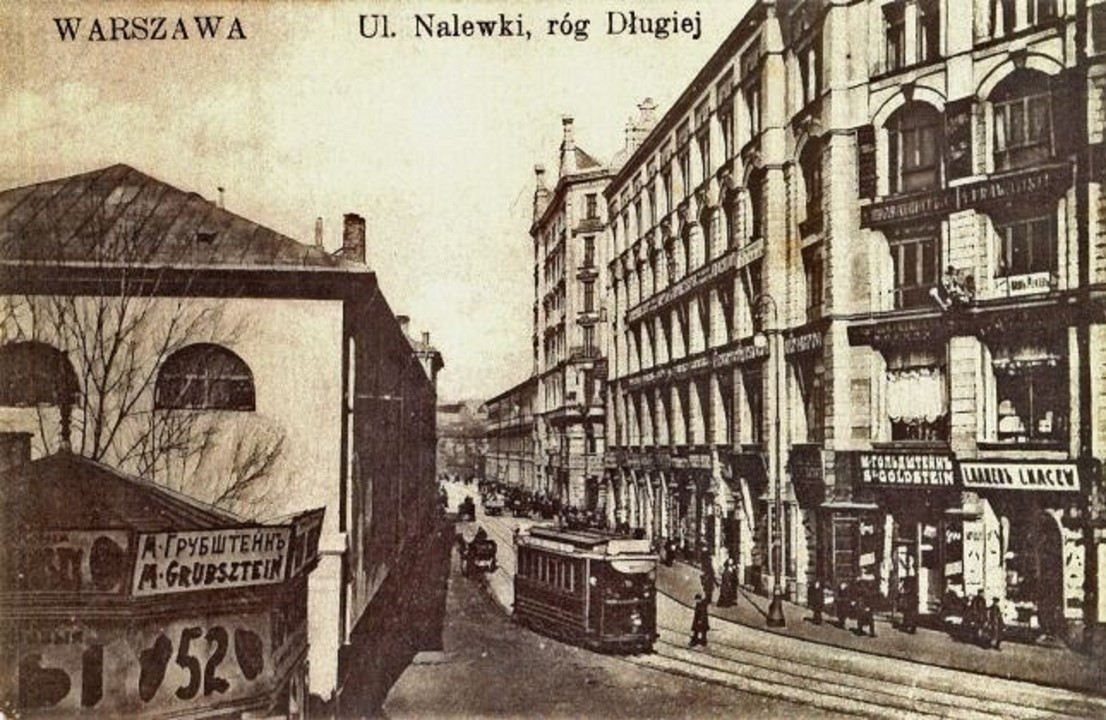
Nalewki Street on a postcard from the early 20th century

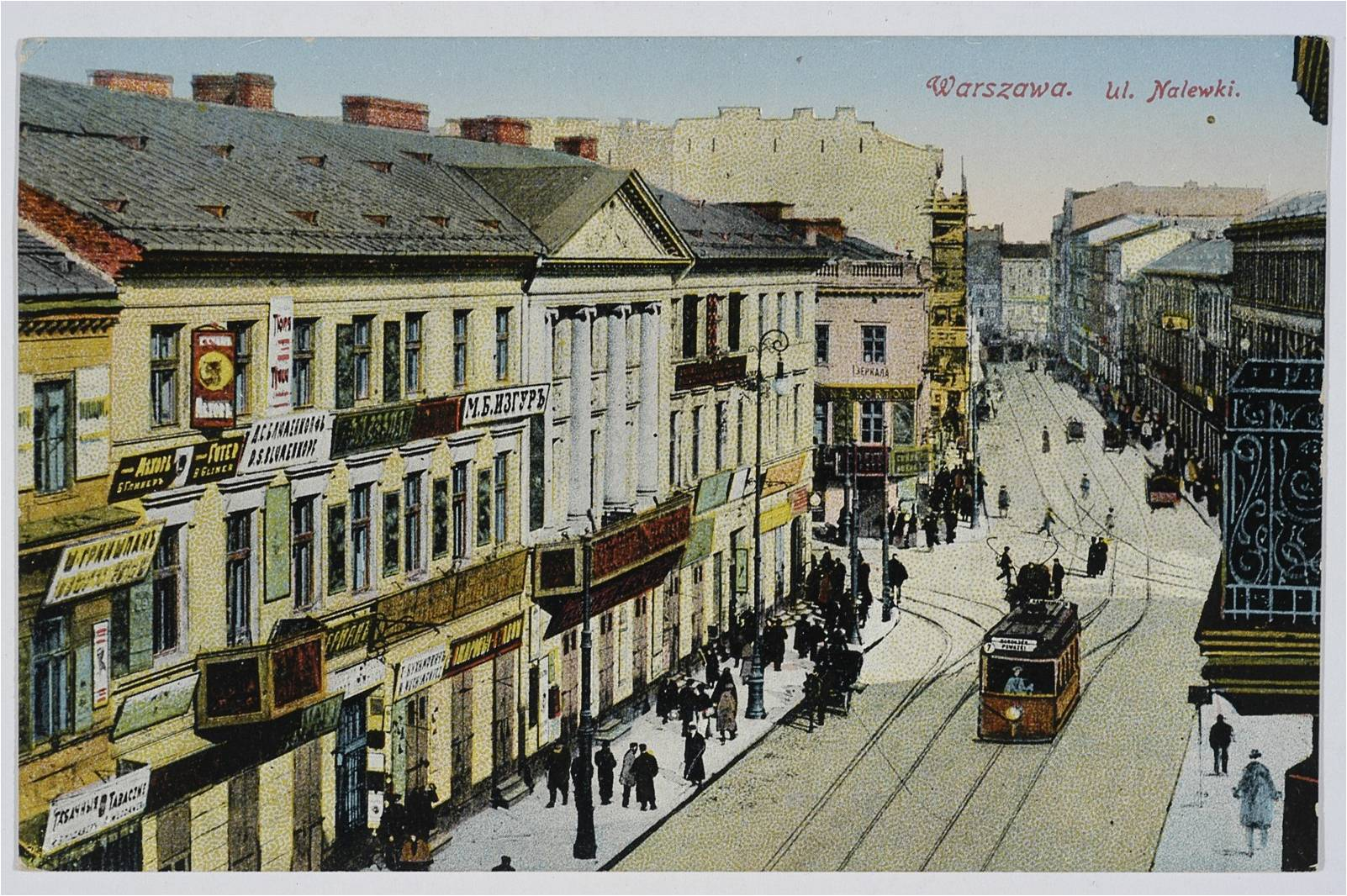
Nalewki Street on postcard after 1906 year

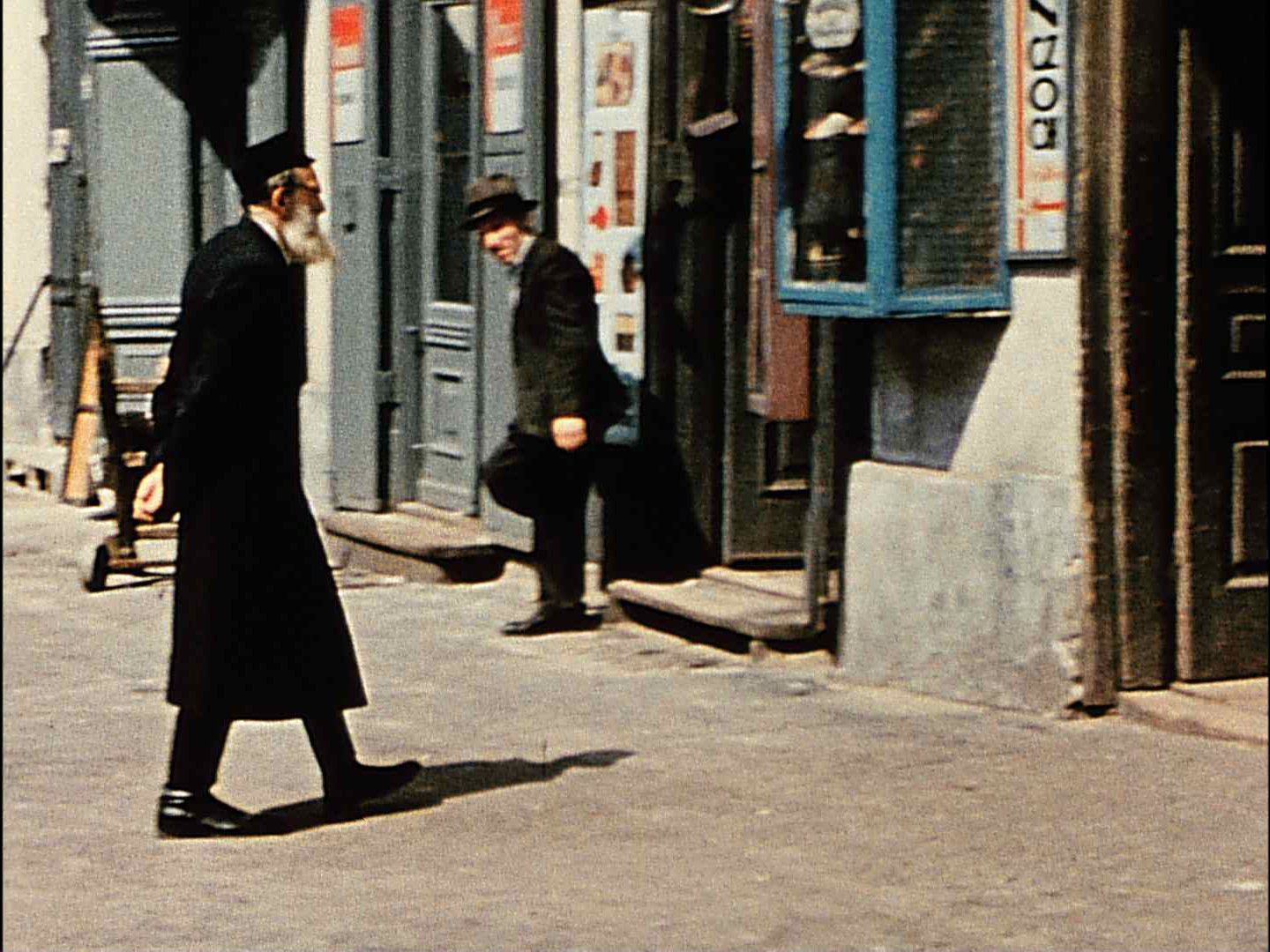
Nalewki Street in August 1939

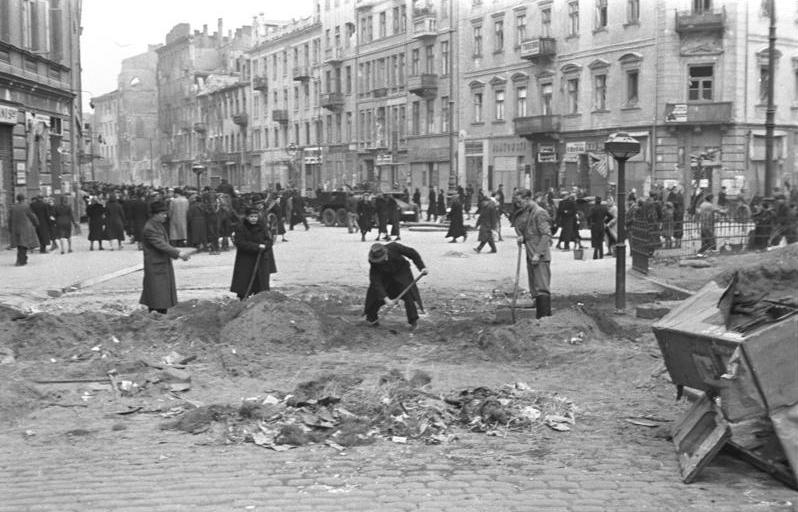
Nalewki Street at Świętojerska Street after defeat of Warsaw in 1939

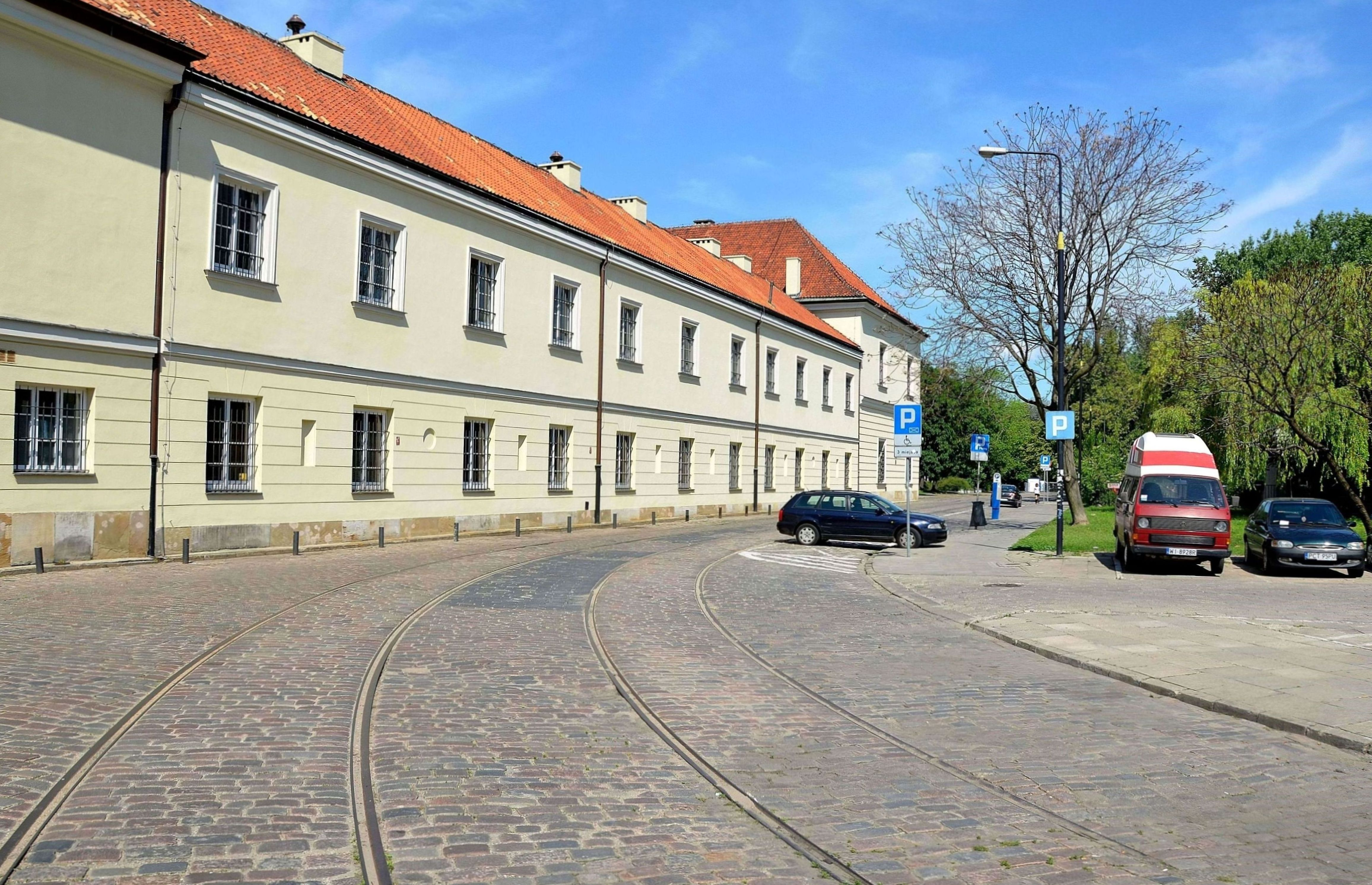
Bohaterów Getta Street with old tram track of Nalewki Street

Nalewki is a street in Warsaw, Poland. The street runs from the Długa Street (Long Street) in the New Town towards what was the northern outskirts of the city in the 19th century, and the neighbourhood of Muranów. Until World War II, the street was longer and was inhabited primarily by Jewish people. Many of its former residents were killed in the Holocaust. after the war it was rebuilt only partially, part of its former course taken up by a park established after the war. The historical Nalewki Street's intersection with Franciszkańska was one of the busiest corners of pre-World War II Warsaw; the present Bohaterów Getta does not get that far.

The name of the street and the area is derived from marshes that used to cover much of the area in the 18th century.

== History ==
The historical name Nalewki came from the small river Bełcząca, also called Nalewka, which once flowed through this area and supplied nearby residents with water. The oldest buildings on the street were the Bridgettines convent (around 1662) with the Church of the Holy Trinity (built between 1652–1658), and the Arsenal, which was assigned to the numbering of Długa Street. In 1769, construction began on the Magazyn Karowy (Wagon Depot). By the end of the 18th century, the Muranowski Square had been formed at the end of the street. At the beginning of the 19th century, the buildings along Nalewki consisted of wooden manors surrounded by vegetable and fruit gardens, and the roadway itself was unpaved.

The street underwent rapid development in the 1820s, associated with the settlement of Warsaw’s Jewish population. Nalewki became the main commercial street in the emerging Jewish district.

On the evening of November 29, 1830, during the November Uprising, insurgents—supported by civilians—captured the Arsenal, tipping the balance of victory to the Polish side during the “Night of November.”

After 1835, the 4th Division of the Warsaw Fire Brigade operated on the former Magazyn Karowy site, while the buildings closer to the Arsenal were taken over by Artillery Barracks. Around 1900, on the site of the demolished Brigedttines complex, the enormous Simons Passage was erected—a grand commercial arcade later expanded in 1904. A new access road to the Passage, Wyjazd Street, was also created.

Nalewki became one of Warsaw’s most important commercial streets and one of the main arteries of the Jewish district, bustling with workshops, department stores, service points, and bookstores. In 1913, there were 329 businesses of various trades operating along the street. The largest multi-courtyard tenement houses in Warsaw were located here, a result of the elongated shape of plots extending toward Długa Street. These tenements were popularly called “Babylons.”

The street’s buildings suffered heavily during the Siege of Warsaw in September 1939. In November 1939, in retaliation for the shooting of a Polish policeman by Pinkus Zylberryng, the Germans executed 53 men from the tenement at No. 9. In November 1940, the northern and central parts of Nalewki were included within the Warsaw Ghetto boundaries. One of the main gates to the closed district stood on Nalewki Street.

On March 26, 1943, at the intersection of Bielańska, Długa, and Nalewki Streets, the famous Operation Arsenal took place.

At dawn on April 19, 1943, through the gate at Nalewki, German troops, together with Latvian and Ukrainian collaborators under the command of Ferdinand von Sammern-Frankenegg, entered the ghetto and encountered armed resistance from Jewish fighters. This marked the beginning of the Warsaw Ghetto Uprising. After the uprising was crushed, the northern section of Nalewki, located within the ghetto, was completely destroyed by the Germans.

The corner of Nalewki and Długa was a site of intense fighting during the Warsaw Uprising. On August 31, 1944, German air forces destroyed the insurgent stronghold in Simons Passage, defended by soldiers of the Home Army battalion Chrobry I, burying around 300 people in its cellars.

== After 1945 ==
On March 15, 1946, a trolleybus line running the entire length of Nalewki Street—from Długa to Muranowska—was opened. However, on December 15, 1946, the construction of Nowomarszałkowska Street (Note: In 1950, Nowomarszałkowska Street was named Marceli Nowotko Street, and in 1990 it was named Gen. Władysław Anders Street) began, which required the demolition of the trolleybus infrastructure along the soon-to-be-removed Nalewki Street.

Between 1946–1947, the middle section of Nalewki was replaced by Nowomarszałkowska Street, while the rest was demolished and replaced with green areas. The only surviving fragment of the street is Stare Nalewki Street, which from 1953 to 2019 bore the name Bohaterów Getta Street (Heroes of the Ghetto Street), still preserving the original pre-war cobblestones and tram tracks.

By resolution of the National Council of Warsaw on March 25, 1959, the name Nalewki Street was given to a small 260-meter-long street laid out between Ludwik Zamenhof Street and Stanisław Dubois Street, partly overlapping the course of the former Gęsia Street.

The destruction of the insurgent redoubt in Simons Passage was commemorated in the 1950s with two Tchorek plaques (located at Długa corner Bohaterów Getta and at 66 Solidarności Avenue). The ghetto gate on Nalewki is commemorated by one of the Ghetto Boundary markers, installed in 2008 at the intersection of Świętojerska Street and General Władysław Anders Avenue.
