= Auschwitz-Birkenau Foundation =

Foundation to preserve the Auschwitz-Birkenau concentration camp site

- Founded: 2009, Warsaw, Poland
- Type: Foundation
- Purpose: Support and protection of Auschwitz-Birkenau Memorial Site
- Location: Warsaw, Poland
- Region served: Poland and abroad
- Method: Fundraising and managing funds for conservation
- President: Piotr Cywiński
- Key people: Władysław Bartoszewski - founder and first chairman of the Council (deceased)
- Website: Official website of the Foundation

Auschwitz-Birkenau Foundation, created in 2009 by Wladyslaw Bartoszewski, aims to gather and manage an endowment from which income shall finance the long-term, global preservation program of the Auschwitz-Birkenau Memorial Site.

== Aim and objectives ==
The main objective of the foundation is to look after the Memorial Site – the grounds and remnants of the former concentration camp KL Auschwitz I and Auschwitz II Birkenau concentration camp - supervised by the Auschwitz-Birkenau State Museum in Oświęcim (...), as well as to support the museum's mission.

The aim is to be accomplished primarily by collecting funds for conservation and financing the conservation works. The funds are collected for the foundation's Perpetual Fund. According to the objectives of the foundation, the annual interest (approximately 4-5 million) from the fund of 120 million EUR, would allow for planned and systematic conservation work.

== World reactions ==
The foundation was registered in Warsaw, Poland in April 2009, but already 2 months earlier, the Polish prime minister Donald Tusk sent letters to dozens of countries requesting assistance in the construction of a proposed endowment fund of 120 million EUR.

On December 16, 2009, Germany took a joint federal-länder decision to donate to the fund 60 million EUR in five equal installments from 2011 to 2015. However, in June 2010, Germany decided to send additional 120,000 EUR to cover the costs of running the foundation's office. At a 2019 ceremony marking the 10th anniversary of the Auschwitz-Birkenau Foundation, Chancellor Angela Merkel of Germany announced another 60 million EUR donation to help preserve the site.

In February 2010, Austria announced a payment of 6,000,000 EUR. In July 2010, United States pledged US$15,000,000 (approximately 12.2 million EUR).

In July 2010, United States of America declared donation of US$15 million (about 12.2 million EUR).

In May 2011 Great Britain declared support of the fund in the amount of 2.15 million GBP (about 2.41 million EUR).

On October 5, 2011, the president of Poland, Bronisław Komorowski, signed a special act (supported earlier by all parliamentary clubs of the lower and higher chambers of Polish Parliament) according to which Poland supported the fund in the amount of 10 million EUR (which is about 8% of the whole fund).

The prime minister of Israel, Benyamin Netanyahu, declared support of 3.6 million NIS (about 715,000 EUR).

In December 2011 the prime minister of France declared 5 million EUR of support for the fund.

Smaller amounts have been donated by Australia, Argentina, Azerbaijan, Belgium, Canada, Czech Republic, Estonia, Finland, Georgia, Hungary, Ireland, Liechtenstein, Luxembourg, Malta, Monaco, the Netherlands, Norway, New Zealand, Switzerland, Sweden, Turkey and the Vatican. as well as by the cities of Paris (France), Boulogne-Billancourt (France) and Kołobrzeg (Poland).

== Foundation's authorities ==
Four separate bodies of the Auschwitz-Birkenau Foundation (the council, the international committee, the management board and the Financial Commission) ensure the transparency, efficiency, and accountability of their respective work, all of which are of crucial importance to the foundation. The foundation's statutes regulate the structural and functional integrity of the process behind the creation and management of the perpetual fund. Moreover, the foundation has established a professional relationship with two renowned companies that advise it on legal matters, accounting and bookkeeping. All of these factors emphasize the foundation's primary objective of securing the safety of the perpetual fund and guaranteeing transparency with respect to the disposal of funds.

Current president of the management board of the foundation is Piotr Cywiński, PhD. Łukasz Rozdeiczer serves as vice-president, Wojciech Soczewica as director general, and Elwir Świętochowski as a member of the board and financial director of the foundation.

On the foundation's council sit: Marek Zając - council's chairman and founder, Marcin Barcz, Daniel Benjamin, Eleonora Bergman, Piotr Kadlčik, Jacek Kastelaniec, Serge Klarsfeld, Edward Kosakowski, Paweł Machcewicz, Zbigniew Nosowski, abp Grzegorz Ryś, Jürgen Rüttgers, and Józef Wancer.

The work of the foundation's is being supervised by the international committee, composed by representatives of countries whose governments have donated for the Perpetual Fund of the foundation. So far, these countries are: Germany, Austria, the United States. And also: Czech Republic, the Kingdom of Sweden, Kingdom of Norway, the Swiss Confederation and the Republic of Estonia.

=== Council ===
The foundation's council is the decision-making, supervisory and opinion forming body. The tasks of the council include appointing and recalling members of the foundation's management board, supervising its decisions and defining the main aims of the foundation's activities.

==== Members of the council ====
As council members serve the following experts:

- Marcin Barcz
- Daniel Benjamin
- Eleonora Bergman – former director of the Jewish Historical Institute in Warsaw, member of the board of trustees of the POLIN-Museum of the History of Polish Jews, member of the International Consultative Council creating the new main exhibition at the Auschwitz-Birkenau State Museum.
- Piotr Kadlčik – former chairman of the Union of Jewish Religious Communities in the Polish Republic, former chairman of the Jewish Community in Warsaw, member of the board of the European Congress of Jews.
- Jacek Kastelaniec – co-founder of the Auschwitz-Birkenau Foundation, former director general of the foundation responsible for fundraising for the statutory activity of the Auschwitz-Birkenau State Museum. Graduate of the Department of Journalism and Political Science at the University of Warsaw and of the University of Montpellier.
- Serge Klarsfeld – historian, lawyer, deputy chairman of the Fondation pour la Mémoire de la Shoah (Foundation for the Memory of the Shoah), chairman of the Fils et Filles des Déportés Juifs de France (Sons and Daughters of the Deported Jews of France), member of the board of trustees of the International Center for Education about Auschwitz and the Holocaust at the Auschwitz-Birkenau State Museum-Birkenau.
- Edward Kosakowski – chairman of the chair of the Conservation and Restoration of Wall Paintings at the Academy of Fine Arts in Kraków, member of the board of trustees of the Auschwitz-Birkenau State Museum.
- Paweł Machcewicz – historian, professor at the Mikołaj Kopernik University in Toruń, former plenipotentiary of the chairman of the council of ministers for the Museum of the Second World War in Gdańsk.
- Zbigniew Nosowski – former co-chairman and now deputy chairman of the Polish Council of Christians and Jews, editor-in-chief of Więź magazine, co-founder and chairman of the Social Committee for the Remembrance of the Jews of Otwock and Karczew.
- Jürgen Rüttgers – minister of education in the Helmut Kohl government from 1994 to 1998, former prime minister of the German State of North Rhine-Westphalia.
- abp Grzegorz Ryś
- Józef Wancer – banker, deputy chairman of Citibank of New York for 23 years, former chairman of the board of Bank BPH.
- Marek Zając – secretary of the International Auschwitz Council, lecturer at the Rev. Józef Tischner Higher European School.

===== Former members of the council =====
In the past, also Agnieszka Magdziak-Miszewska – former consul-general of the Republic of Poland in New York, the ambassador of the Republic of Poland in Israel, former member of the International Auschwitz Council, served as council member.

====== Deceased members of the council ======
- Władysław Bartoszewski – former prisoner of the Auschwitz Concentration Camp, co-founder of the Żegota Jewish Aid Council, chairman of the International Auschwitz Council and the Board for the Protection of the Memory of Combat and Martyrdom, minister of foreign affairs for the Government of the Polish Republic (twice), secretary of state in the chancellery of the chairman of the council of ministers, Plenipotentiary for International Dialogue. Founder and first chairman of the Auschwitz-Birkenau Foundation's council.
- Henryk Flug – former prisoner of Nazi concentration camps, chairman of the Center of Organizations of Holocaust Survivors and the International Auschwitz Committee, member of the International Auschwitz Council.
- Kalman Sultanik – former prisoner of Nazi concentration camps, deputy chairman of the World Jewish Congress and the United Israel Appeal, member of the International Auschwitz Council, chairman of the financial commission of the International Auschwitz Council.
- Henryk Wujec – survivor of the Zamość expulsions during World War II. During communist period in Poland, long-term dissident. Social activist. For the years 1989–2001, member of the Parliament of Poland. From 2010 to 2015, served as the advisor on social affairs to the president of Poland, Bronisław Komorowski. Member of the International Auschwitz Council.
- Abp. Józef Życiński – Metropolitan of Lublin, theologian, philosopher, member of the Polish Academy of Science, member of the Papal Culture Council, great chancellor of the Lublin Catholic University, lecturer at Berkeley and Oxford Universities.

=== International committee ===
The statutes allow an international committee to ensure that the functioning of the foundation is completely transparent to the public and to its benefactors. The members of the Committee come from countries and institutions which contributed to the creation of the Perpetual Capital Fund. The international committee has constant access to information about the work of the foundation, and assesses the work of the foundation and examines its plans at special sessions. No changes to the foundation's statutes will be possible without first consulting with the committee.

As per 2021, the international committee members were delegates (mostly in the rank of ambassadors) of the following countries (in the alphabetical order): Argentina, Australia, Austria, Azerbaijan, Belgium, Bulgaria, Canada, Cyprus, Czech Republic, Estonia, Finland, France, Georgia, Germany, Greece, Hungary, Ireland, Israel, Italy, Luxembourg, Monaco, Netherlands, New Zealand, Norway, Portugal, Russian Federation, Slovakia, Spain, Switzerland, Sweden, Turkey, United Kingdom, and USA.

=== Management board ===
The management board manages the foundation's activities and represents it externally. It consists of one to six members appointed by the foundation's council for three-year terms of office. Currently, it consists of the following four members:

- Piotr Cywiński, PhD – president of the management board and also director of the Auschwitz-Birkenau State Museum, long-serving secretary of the International Auschwitz Council. Historian (PhD) specialising in medieval ages and Second World War periods. For the years 2000–2010 served as president of the Warsaw Club of Catholic Intelligentsia (KIK).
- Łukasz Rozdeiczer-Kryszkowski – vice-president of the foundation's management board. Lawyer, graduate of Harvard, Cambridge, and Warsaw universities, lecturer in law at Georgetown University.
- Wojciech Soczewica - Director General
- Elwir Świętochowski - Member of the Board, Financial Director

==== Former members of the management board ====
Rafał Pióro– deputy director of the Auschwitz-Birkenau State Museum responsible for the preservation of the site, collections and archives; former head of the Preservation Department at the museum; and creator of the conservation workshops and laboratories at the Auschwitz-Birkenau State Museum.

=== Financial committee ===
The financial committee, consisting of renowned experts in the field of safe fund investing, advises the foundation's management board on fund investing strategy. The objective of the commission's members is to: coordinate and oversee the financial work of the Auschwitz—Birkenau Foundation; selectively choose the appropriate banking institution in which the endowment fund shall be deposited; develop recommendations for investing the Perpetual Capital; cooperate with companies that specialize in such investments.

Chairman: Józef Wancer.

Members:

- Ludmiła Falak-Cyniak,
- Alfred Finz,
- Włodzimierz Grudziński,
- Peter Hommelhoff,
- Antoni F. Reczek,
- Ekkehard Thiesler
- and Claude Trink.

== See also ==
- Auschwitz-Birkenau
- International Auschwitz Council
