= Eleonora Bergman =

Polish architecture historian

- Born: 22 October 1947 (age 78)
- Education: PhD in art history
- Alma mater: Warsaw University of Technology: architecture, University of Warsaw: art history - PhD

Eleonora Bergman (born 1947) is a Polish architectural historian who has worked on the preservation of Jewish heritage in Poland. She was director of the Jewish Historical Institute in Warsaw from 2007 to 2011.

== Biography ==
Born into a Jewish family in Poland, Bergman studied architecture at the Warsaw University of Technology. She began her career at the Institute of Urban Planning and Architecture, and became increasingly interested in architectural history. She later researched architectural monuments in Poland for the Arts Institute of the Polish Academy of Sciences.

In 1991, she began work with the Jewish Historical Institute, documenting Jewish religious buildings and landmarks. Bergman received her PhD from the Institute of Art History of the University of Warsaw in 1997.

Bergman has published a number of articles and monographs. She has also published several books.

She serves as a member of the council of the Auschwitz-Birkenau Foundation.

== Selected publications ==
- Zachowane synagogi i domy modlitwy w Polsce: katalog (1996), with Jan Jagielski
- Nurt mauretański w architekturze synagog Europy Środkowo-Wschodniej w XIX i na początku XX wieku (2004)
- Nie masz bóżnicy powszechnej. Synagogi i domy modlitwy w Warszawie od końca XVIII do początku XXI wieku (2007)

== Awards and honours ==
In 2012, she was awarded the French Legion of Honour.
