= Franciszkańska Street, Warsaw =

Street in Warsaw, Poland

Coordinates: 52°15′08″N 21°00′12″E

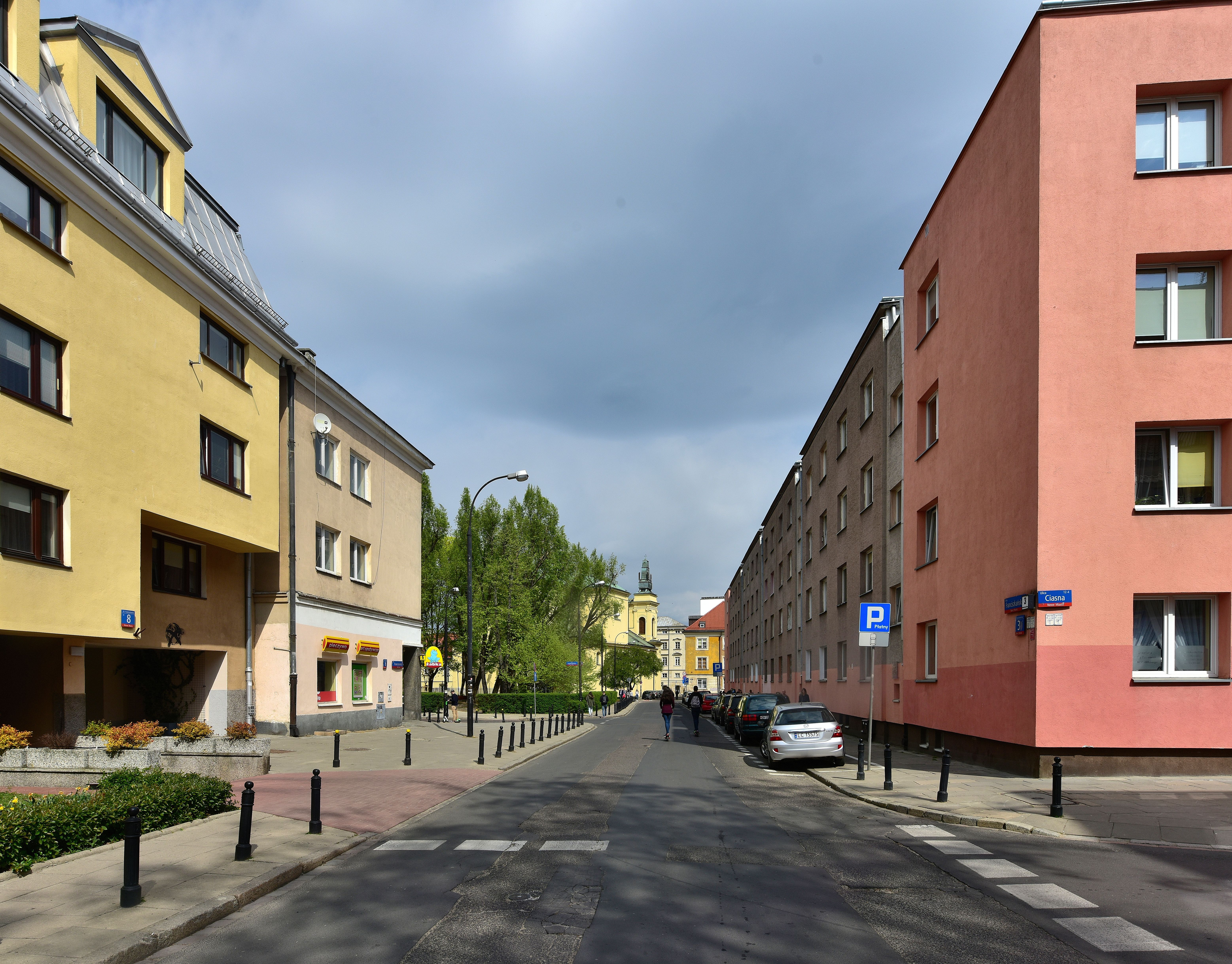
Franciszkańska Street.

Franciszkańska (Polish: Franciscan Street) is a street in the centre of Warsaw, linking the New Town with Nalewki street. In the 19th century it was inhabited primarily by Jews, who converted the street into a large open-air marketplace. The name itself was derived from the Church of Saint Francis owned by the Franciscans.

The street was destroyed during World War II, along with most of the New Town and Old Town. The Franciscans were able to rebuild their church, as well as the adjoining monastery. The church was finally finished with the completion of the main altar in the mid-1970s. The street itself was rebuilt in 1949, with most of the buildings, constructed in what was at the time a "model" socialist housing style, occupied in 1950. (There was one exception: an apartment building that survived the war and, although dilapidated, remained occupied until the late 1970s, when it was torn down and a new building put in its place.) The new buildings were occupied by workers of the PWPW, the state printing concern a few blocks over, where money was being printed before the war as well after. Ironically, because the PWPW was built to include the government bunkers in case of war, it was literally impossible to tear down after the war.

Today, Franciszkańska is a residential street in a very desirable part of town.
