= Jewish Ghetto Police in Warsaw Ghetto =

Auxiliary police formation in the Warsaw Ghetto

Jewish Ghetto Police
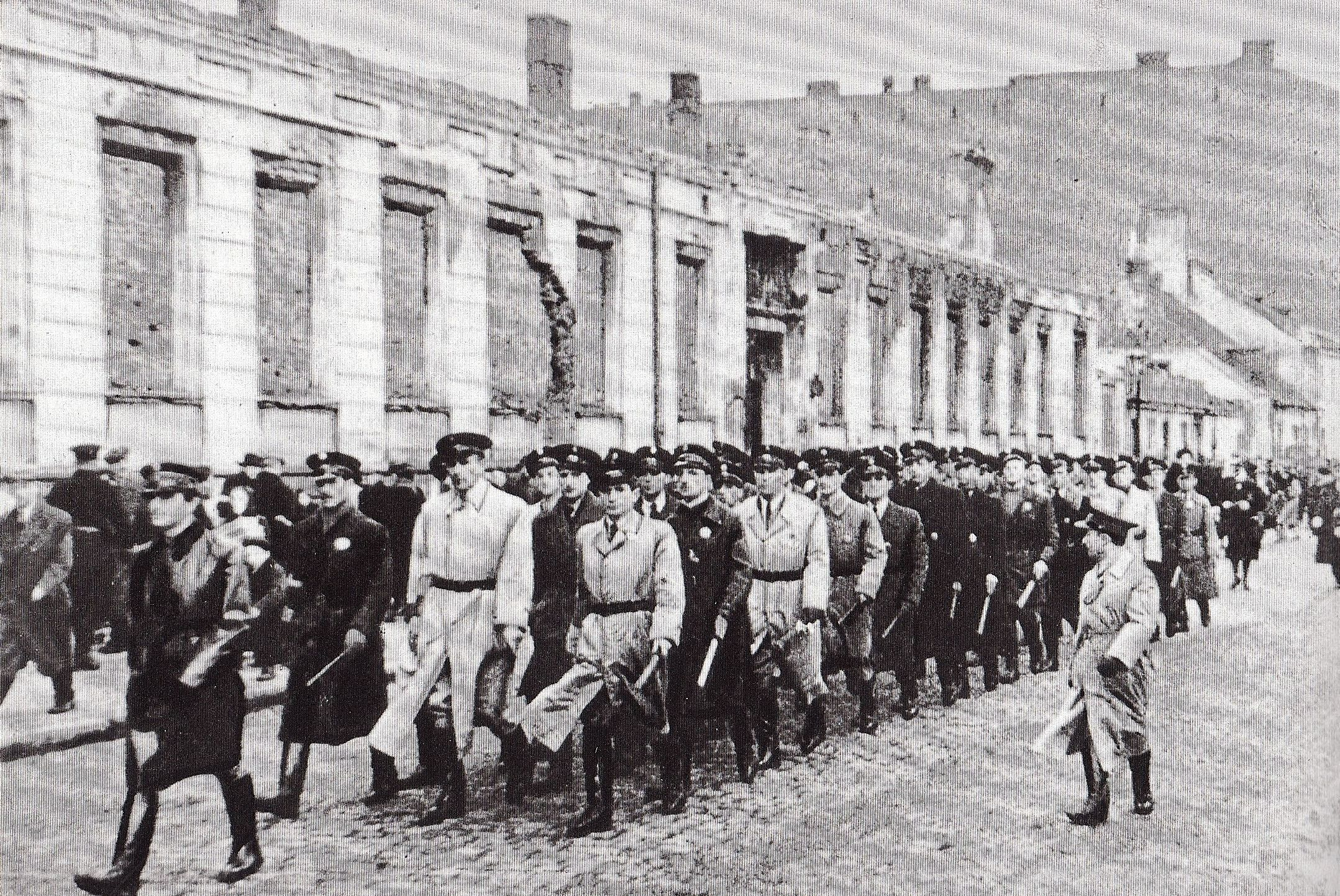
- Unit of the Jewish Ghetto Police marching along Grzybowska Street
- Founded: October 1940
- Disbanded: April 1943
- Country: Nazi Germany
- Allegiance: Blue Police
- Size: ~2,000

Commanders
- First commander: Józef Szeryński

The Jewish Ghetto Police in Warsaw Ghetto, commonly known as the Jewish Police (German: Jüdischer Ordnungsdienst), was an auxiliary police formation composed of Jews, established by the German occupation authorities. It operated from 1940 to 1943 in the Warsaw Ghetto.

The Jewish Ghetto Police was formally subordinate to the Blue Police. Its creation was directly tied to the German plan to establish a sealed ghetto for Warsaw's Jewish population. Unlike typical police forces, the Jewish Ghetto Police had limited authority, focusing primarily on general order maintenance. Its members were equipped only with batons. Most received no salaries, though service in the Jewish Ghetto Police provided various official and unofficial privileges. The force primarily comprised pre-war civil servants, entrepreneurs, and members of the liberal professions.

Initially, ghetto residents regarded the Jewish Ghetto Police with some trust. However, its reputation quickly deteriorated due to widespread corruption and brutality among its members. Significant resentment arose from the Jewish Ghetto Police's involvement, under German orders, in roundups for forced labor camps in spring 1941. The force was also perceived as dominated by assimilated Jews, though this was largely inaccurate. During Grossaktion Warsaw in summer 1942, Jewish Ghetto Police members assisted Nazis in organizing deportations to the Treblinka extermination camp. Many displayed excessive zeal, brutality, and corruption, making the Jewish Ghetto Police the most despised institution in the Warsaw Ghetto. Despite earlier German promises of safety, many Jewish Ghetto Police members were dismissed and deported with their families to Treblinka and Majdanek during the final phase of the deportation.

Following Grossaktion Warsaw, Jewish Ghetto Police members became targets of attacks by the Jewish resistance. The significantly reduced force also lost influence. The Jewish Ghetto Police was ultimately disbanded after the outbreak of the Warsaw Ghetto Uprising.

== Origins and establishment ==
The origins of the Jewish Ghetto Police in the Warsaw Ghetto date back to late 1939. The Warsaw Judenrat established the Labour Unit (later renamed the Labour Battalion), tasked with supplying forced labor contingents as demanded by the German occupation authorities. In March 1940, due to increasing labour duty evasion, the Labour Battalion formed the Order Guard, primarily responsible for escorting men assigned to forced labor. This guard numbered 111 members. By late May 1940, it was reorganized into a separate department with expanded duties, including overseeing the construction of walls around the future ghetto, patrolling the Jewish Cemetery at 15 Okopowa Street, and maintaining order at the Labour Battalion's headquarters and other Judenrat offices. The Order Guard was plagued by corruption. It also faced significant Gestapo infiltration.

On 20 September 1940, the German city governor of Warsaw, Ludwig Leist, summoned the Judenrat chairman, Adam Czerniaków. An unnamed official from the Warsaw District governor's office proposed forming a 3,000-strong order service, though Leist reduced this to 1,000, stating it was part of plans to grant "autonomy" to Warsaw's Jews. On 12 October 1940, German authorities officially instructed Czerniaków to establish a 1,000-member "Jewish militia". When he raised financial concerns, he was told the service should be voluntary or funded by the Jewish community.

The order to create the "Jewish militia" was directly tied to German plans to establish a sealed ghetto in Warsaw, announced via street megaphones on 12 October 1940. This was part of a broader effort to form Jewish Ghetto Polices in nearly all major Jewish ghettos in occupied Poland.

On 13 October, the Judenrat appointed a verification committee to review candidates for the new formation. Officially named the Jewish Ghetto Police, it was commonly referred to as the Jewish Police. The Order Guard formed the nucleus of the Jewish Ghetto Police, with its members automatically transferred to the new force. Leist left the selection of the Jewish Ghetto Police's commander to Czerniaków. On 26 or 29 October, Józef Szeryński assumed the role. On 12 November, the Judenrat submitted the Jewish Ghetto Police's draft statute to German authorities, which was approved on 29 November.

On 16 November 1940, the Warsaw Ghetto was officially sealed. That day, Jewish Ghetto Police members patrolled its streets for the first time, guided by the Blue Police officers, some of whom included Jewish policemen in their patrols. The Jewish Ghetto Police began fully independent operations on 12 January 1941.

== Relationship with occupation authorities and the Judenrat ==
The Jewish Ghetto Police was an auxiliary formation tasked with carrying out duties assigned by the German occupation authorities, the Blue Police, and the Warsaw Judenrat. Unlike the Blue Police, it was not considered part of the German Ordnungspolizei. Its subordinate status was reflected in its designation as an "order service" rather than a full-fledged police force, and its authority was significantly narrower than that of the Blue Police.

The Jewish Ghetto Police was officially subordinate to the Blue Police, with oversight by the Warsaw Polish Police commander, Aleksander Reszczyński. Operationally, it reported to the Warsaw-North Command, led by Mieczysław Tarwid. The legal basis for this subordination is unclear, but the Jewish Ghetto Police commander was required to submit orders for approval by the Blue Police, which also vetted candidates, promotions, and demotions. Briefings for Jewish Ghetto Police precinct officers and platoon commanders were held at the four Blue Police stations remaining in the ghetto after its closure. Jewish Ghetto Police and Blue Police precinct officers conducted joint patrols, and each Polish station was assigned a Jewish Ghetto Police unit for auxiliary tasks, along with permanent bicycle couriers.

In practice, the German civil administration, particularly the Commissioner for the Jewish Residential District, Heinz Auerswald, wielded significant influence over the Jewish Ghetto Police's daily operations. He determined food rations for the Jewish Ghetto Police and allocated buildings for its use. The Jewish Ghetto Police commander was required to submit detailed daily and weekly reports to him. Additionally, the Jewish Ghetto Police commander and the Judenrat chairman reported weekly to the headquarters of the SD and Security Police in the Warsaw District at 25 Johann Christian Schuch Avenue, where they briefed the heads of Section IV B 4 ("Jewish Section"), Karl Georg Brandt and Gerhard Mende. The Jewish Ghetto Police was required to submit translations of its daily orders and candidate lists to the Security Police for approval. However, German security services showed little interest in the Jewish Ghetto Police's affairs, and the number of Gestapo informants within its ranks was relatively small, (Note: One of the Gestapo agents placed within the ranks of the Jewish Ghetto Police was Józef Ehrlich ("Josełe Kapota"), who later became deputy head of this formation. According to one account, he introduced about 100 of his trusted men into the Jewish Ghetto Police (Urynowicz (2009, p. 289)). Person (2018, p. 50), however, argues that the number of Gestapo informants within the Jewish Ghetto Police was small, and certainly lower than in analogous formations that existed in the ghettos of Łódź, Kraków, or Radom.) with their actual influence difficult to assess.

Initially, the Jewish Ghetto Police was intended to be closely subordinate to the Warsaw Judenrat. A dedicated Department XVII (Order Service) was established within the Judenrat to oversee the Jewish Ghetto Police, chaired by Leopold Kupczykier. However, Kupczykier lacked the qualifications and experience to assert authority over the ambitious Jewish Ghetto Police commander, Józef Szeryński, leading to his resignation. He was replaced by Bernard Zundelewicz. Zundelewicz maintained a cordial relationship with Szeryński, but he too had limited influence over the Jewish Ghetto Police. Judenrat chairman Adam Czerniaków granted Szeryński significant autonomy, supporting his close ties with the Blue Police leadership as a means to break the isolation of Warsaw's Jews. The two maintained a strong professional and social relationship, with Szeryński among Czerniaków's closest associates.

The Judenrat's influence over the Jewish Ghetto Police was minimal. The Jewish Ghetto Police leadership made no attempts to gain independence from or strengthen its position at the expense of the Judenrat.

Katarzyna Person notes that the Jewish Ghetto Police's subordination to various overlapping authorities was often unclear, forcing its leadership to navigate complex expectations from multiple entities. Compared to similar formations in other ghettos, the Jewish Ghetto Police's authority was relatively limited, at least until Grossaktion Warsaw.

The establishment of the Jewish Ghetto Police was part of a broader effort to create Jewish Ghetto Polices in major ghettos in occupied Poland. It is unclear whether the Warsaw Jewish Ghetto Police was formally linked to similar formations elsewhere. The propaganda newspaper Gazeta Żydowska reported that other ghetto services modeled themselves on the Warsaw Jewish Ghetto Police and sought its technical guidance.

== Composition ==
=== Commander ===
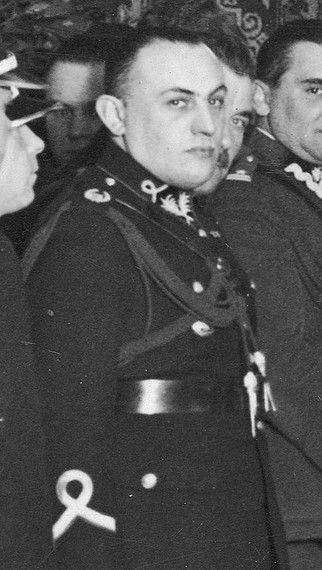
Józef Szeryński (1931)

According to some sources, the initial candidates considered for the position of Jewish Ghetto Police commander were two respected lawyers and community activists: Leon Berenson and Maksymilian Schönbach. Berenson was unable to take on the role due to poor health, while Schönbach expressed willingness to accept only a lower position within the new formation. Ultimately, the role was offered to Józef Szeryński. His candidacy was reportedly suggested to Chairman Czerniaków by either Berenson or Stefan Lubliner. According to a report by a Jewish Ghetto Police officer who was also a collaborator with the underground Ghetto Archive, the decision to appoint Szeryński was made at a meeting held at the apartment of Judenrat member and later head of Department XVII (Order Service), Leopold Kupczykier. The meeting was attended by Kupczykier, Czerniaków, Edward Kobryner, and Szeryński himself.

Józef Andrzej Szeryński (born Szenkman or Szynkman) was a convert to Christianity and one of the few individuals of Jewish descent to hold a senior position in the Polish State Police before the war. He served as head of the press office at the Police Headquarters (effectively its press spokesperson) and as an inspection officer at the Provincial Police Command in Lublin from 1935 to 1939. He also authored several specialized publications on police organization. Szeryński's extensive experience and organizational skills were evident in his leadership of the Jewish Ghetto Police's formation. According to Polish Underground State informants, he maintained close relations with the leadership of the Blue Police in Warsaw, including commanders Marian Kozielewski and Aleksander Reszczyński, and chief of staff Bolesław Buyko. However, due to his conversion to Christianity and pre-war work in Lublin, he was largely alienated from Warsaw's Jewish community.

In May 1942, Szeryński was arrested by the Germans and imprisoned in Pawiak. The acting commander role was assumed by Jakub Lejkin, a lawyer and graduate of the Reserve Officer Cadet School in Jarocin, who headed the Jewish Ghetto Police's service and training department. In the ghetto's early days, Lejkin quickly rose through the Jewish Ghetto Police ranks, distinguishing himself with zeal during roundups for labour camps and a controversial disinfection operation at 15 Krochmalna Street.

Two months later, during Grossaktion Warsaw, Szeryński was released from Pawiak and reinstated as Jewish Ghetto Police commander, though he did not regain his former authority. His position was further weakened by a mental breakdown following an assassination attempt on his life in August 1942.

Szeryński committed suicide after the January Action in 1943. He was succeeded by Leon Piżyc, who led the Jewish Ghetto Police until the outbreak of the Warsaw Ghetto Uprising and the formation's final dissolution.

=== Officer corps ===
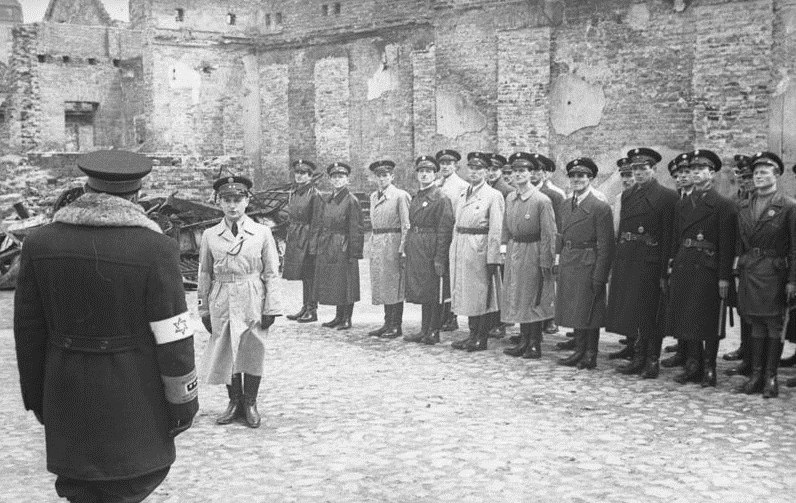
Józef Szeryński (facing away) receiving a report from Jakub Lejkin

Lawyers were prominently represented among Jewish Ghetto Police officers, leading to the formation's frequent association with this profession. Initially, key roles were held exclusively by converts or assimilated Jews, who were closely aligned with Szeryński.

Over time, officers not previously connected to Szeryński gained prominence within the Jewish Ghetto Police, particularly those who distinguished themselves during service. Notably, Jakub Lejkin and Mieczysław Szmerling took on the most controversial tasks, such as roundups for labour camps and anti-epidemic duties, and assumed real control over the Jewish Ghetto Police during Grossaktion Warsaw.

Initially, the deputy commander was Marian Händel, the former head of the Order Guard. Due to his close ties with the Gestapo, he served as an informal liaison between the Judenrat and German authorities. Händel was in sharp conflict with Szeryński, who considered him a collaborator and warned his associates about him, though the conflict likely stemmed from personal ambitions. In summer 1941, Szeryński capitalized on Händel's deteriorating relations with his German protectors to strip him of most responsibilities. In July 1942, following the start of Grossaktion Warsaw and the suicide of Adam Czerniaków, Händel fled Warsaw.

During Grossaktion Warsaw, the Germans appointed Józef Ehrlich as deputy commander. Known as "Josełe Kapota", Ehrlich was a Gestapo informant who initially collaborated with the Germans in extorting wealthy Jewish entrepreneurs. In mid-1941, the Gestapo placed him in the Jewish Ghetto Police leadership as an informal liaison. Ehrlich participated in Grossaktion Warsaw, reportedly attempting to save some Jews from the Umschlagplatz for money or other reasons. He was killed in the final phase of Grossaktion Warsaw by his former Gestapo protector, SS-Obersturmführer Kurt Nicolaus.

After Grossaktion Warsaw, Jakub Lejkin became deputy commander. Following his assassination by the Jewish Combat Organization in October 1942, the role was filled successively by Leon Piżyc and Herman Kac.

The head of the Jewish Ghetto Police leadership's office was Stefan Lubliner. Szeryński appointed close friends to key roles: Stanisław Czapliński as his adjutant and Marceli Czapliński as head of the economic department.

=== Rank-and-file members ===
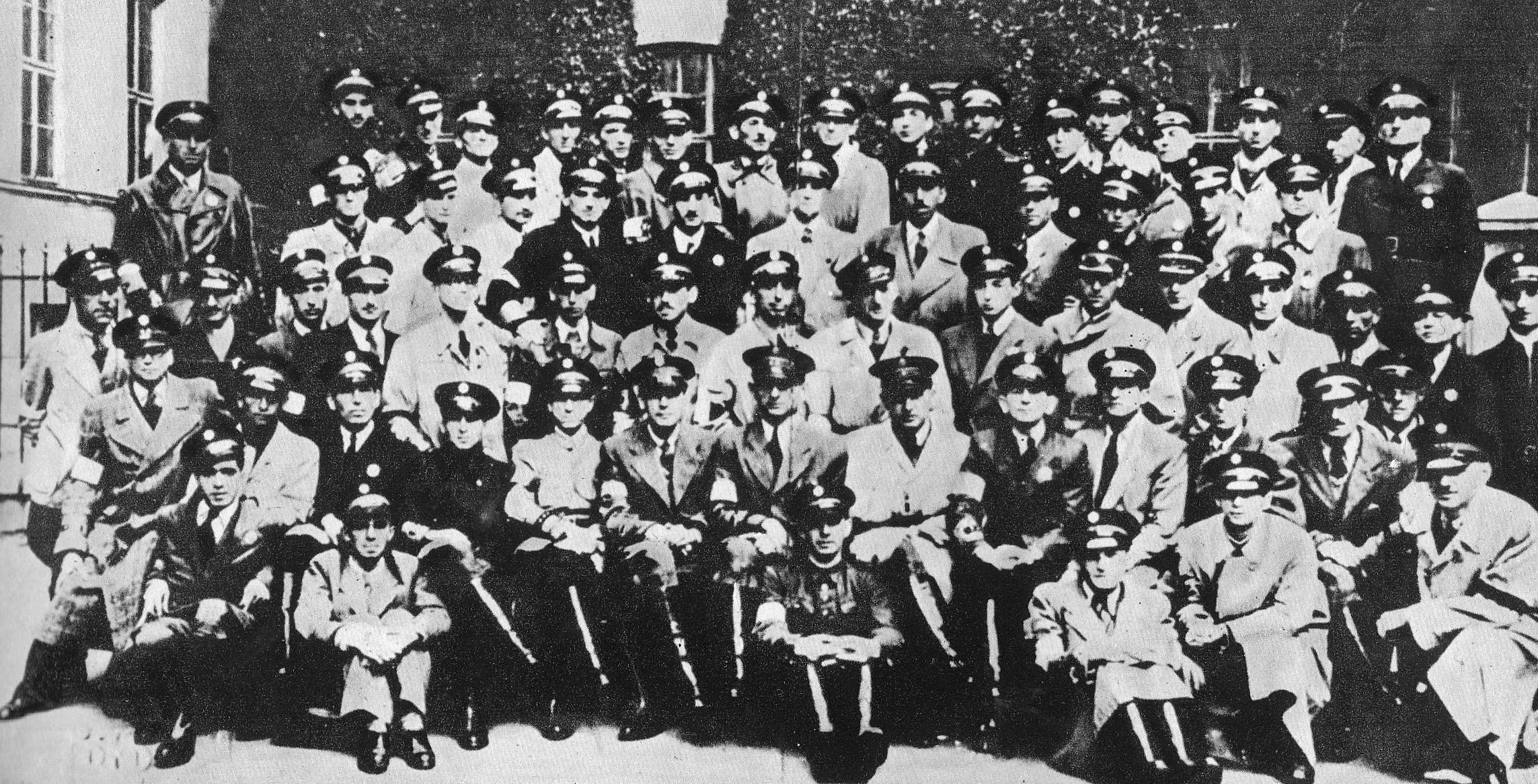
Jewish Ghetto Police members in a group photo

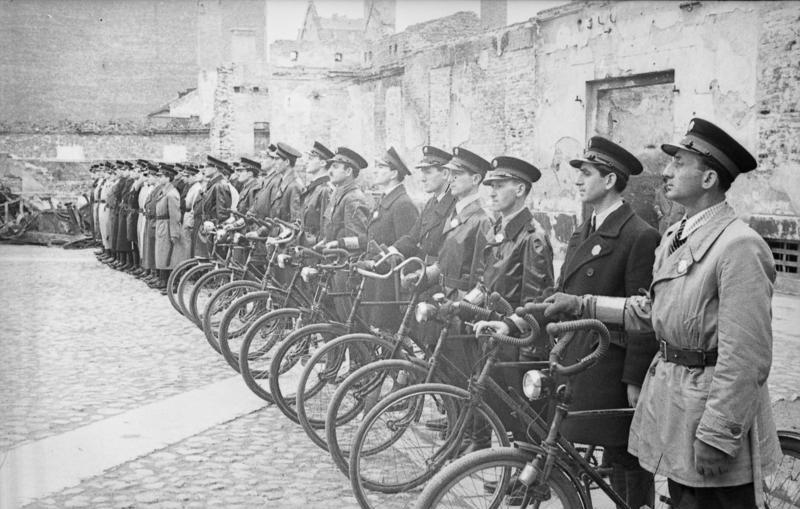
Jewish Ghetto Police bicycle couriers

Requirements for joining the Jewish Ghetto Police included: age 21–40, completion of six years of secondary school, good health, a minimum height of 170 cm, a minimum weight of 60 kg, completed military service, no criminal record, references from two known ghetto residents, and a positive opinion from the house committee. Candidates were required to pay a 5 PLN recruitment fee, with 2 PLN allocated to medical examinations and the remainder to the Jewish Ghetto Police budget. After submitting applications and fees, candidates appeared before a verification committee, which reviewed their applications and referred them to a medical board. Successful candidates faced a final "super-review" by a special committee chaired by Szeryński, who often made unilateral decisions on acceptance. According to Stanisław Adler, many criminals attempted to join the Jewish Ghetto Police, but most were rejected due to the verification committees' efforts.

Recruitment to the Jewish Ghetto Police concluded in autumn 1940. By mid-November 1940, the force numbered 1,635 members. (Note: Reports of the Judenrat from November 1940 and an article in the collaborationist Gazeta Żydowska of 8 November 1940 state that 1,312 candidates underwent examinations before the medical commission, of whom 1,000 were admitted into the Jewish Ghetto Police (Person (2018, p. 34)).) In January 1941, a second recruitment increased the force to 2,000. In summer 1941, an additional 200 members were recruited to form an anti-epidemic service (later reorganized as the Epidemic Company).

In summer 1941, approximately 200 former members of the collaborationist Group 13 were incorporated into the Jewish Ghetto Police. Despite efforts by its leader, Abraham Gancwajch, they received no special privileges. They were not integrated as a cohesive group but were dispersed across various Jewish Ghetto Police units and districts. No senior Group 13 members were transferred to the Jewish Ghetto Police, and those accepted received lower positions than they had held previously.

According to a Jewish Ghetto Police officer collaborating with Oneg Shabbat, the initial recruits included pre-war civil servants (28.7%), merchants and industrialists (23.2%), liberal professionals (16.7%), technicians (15.2%), artisans (10.3%), and students, pupils, or dependents (5.7%). Service in the Jewish Ghetto Police was considered one of the most desirable jobs in the ghetto. However, joining typically required paying a bribe or leveraging connections. As a result, the force was dominated by social classes with sufficient financial resources or networks.

High turnover was common among Jewish Ghetto Police members. Financial difficulties were the primary reason for resignations, though disciplinary issues or German orders could also lead to dismissal. Vacancies were quickly filled due to the job's appeal, particularly as it offered protection from deportation to forced labor camps.

Many Jewish Ghetto Police members, especially higher-ranking ones, did not speak Yiddish, the primary language of most ghetto residents. Gazeta Żydowska reported that Yiddish courses were organized for them. Nonetheless, Polish remained the sole administrative language within the Jewish Ghetto Police throughout its existence. Contrary to post-war perceptions, the Jewish Ghetto Police was not dominated by converts or assimilated Jews. Its ranks included individuals from exclusively Jewish backgrounds, including orthodox families, yeshiva graduates, and supporters or members of the General Jewish Labour Bund, Polish Socialist Party, or Zionist parties. One member, Srul Berensztajn, was a certified rabbi.

=== Other personnel ===
In addition to regular members, the Jewish Ghetto Police employed civilian staff and auxiliary personnel. Civilian staff included secretaries handling correspondence, reporting, and service records, clerks responsible for collecting Jewish Ghetto Police taxes, instructors, and cashiers. Auxiliary personnel included typists, cleaners, and kitchen or canteen workers.

Non-uniformed Jewish Ghetto Police personnel included 10 doctors providing medical care to members. The chief physician was Dr. Zygmunt Fajcyn. Among them was Henryk Makower, director of the infectious disease ward at Bersohn and Bauman Children's Hospital and Szeryński's personal physician.

The Jewish Ghetto Police also employed young men under 21 as messengers. They typically came from wealthy or well-connected families who secured these positions to protect them from forced labor.

== Organizational structure ==
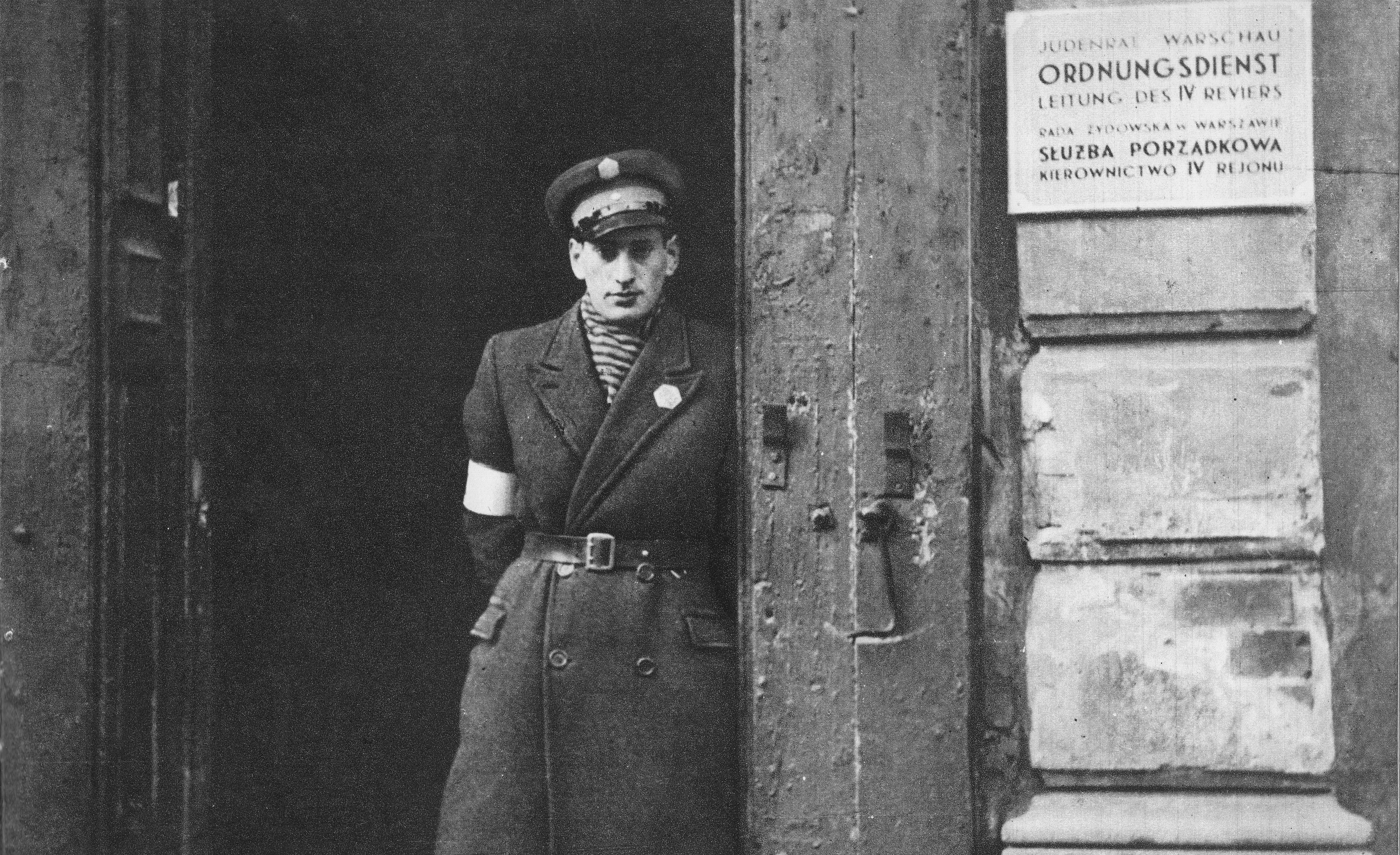
Jewish policeman at the entrance to the Jewish Ghetto Police District IV headquarters at 4 Gęsia Street

The Jewish Ghetto Police officer ranks included commander, deputy commander, district officer, and deputy district officer. Lower ranks were group leaders, section leaders, and orderlies.

The Jewish Ghetto Police leadership initially comprised a secretariat and three departments:

- Department I (administrative-organizational). Heads: Stanisław Gombiński, Rafał Lederman, Jakub Pinkiert:
  - organizational section
  - administrative section
  - service and training section
- Department II (personnel). Head: Nikodem Goldsztein:
  - material section
  - disciplinary-order section
- Department III (economic). Heads: Czesław Kornblit, Marceli Czapliński:
  - quartermaster section
  - treasury Section
  - office (adjutancy)
  - inspection

Over time, the service and training section and the disciplinary-order section were elevated to independent sections. The Jewish Ghetto Police also established units directly under the commander: the Central Detention Center, Hospital Guard Unit, air defense section, and press section. (Note: The press department closely cooperated with Gazeta Żydowska, which published Jewish Ghetto Police announcements as well as all information concerning its daily functioning (Person (2018, p. 64)).)

Initially, the Jewish Ghetto Police consisted of six line companies, each divided into four platoons of approximately 50 members. A separate "Commune" company, composed of two platoons of former Order Guard members, was tasked with maintaining order in Judenrat offices and agencies. Its commanders were Józef Rode and Seweryn Spotkowski.

Separate from the seven companies were three reserve platoons, a bicycle courier platoon, an administrative platoon (precinct officers), and an instructional cadre.

In January 1941, the ghetto was divided into six police districts, with boundaries occasionally adjusted as the ghetto's borders changed:

- District I, headquartered at 15 Twarda Street. Head: Karol Peczenik.
- District II, headquartered at 15 Chłodna Street. Head: Henryk Nadel.
- District III, headquartered at 40 Leszno Street. Head: Albin Fleischman.
- District IV, headquartered at 4 Gęsia Street. Head: Henryk Landau (probable).
- District V, headquartered at 19 Ludwik Zamenhof Street. Head: Oskar Sekler.
- District VI, headquartered at 42 Gęsia Street. Head: Józef Jerzy Hertz.

Each district was led by a head with the rank of deputy district officer, supported by two deputies: one for line duties and one for administration, also holding deputy district officer rank. Line duties in each district were performed by three police platoons of 45–50 members. Each platoon consisted of three groups, a commander and deputy, a communications section, and a chief and clerk. Groups were divided into three four-member sections and a group leader. Each district also employed approximately 15 administrative and office staff and about 40 auxiliary personnel.

In April 1941, the ghetto began organizing air defense structures. A dedicated section was established within the Jewish Ghetto Police leadership, headed by Henryk Weisblat, with sections also formed under district heads.

In June 1941, to combat infectious disease epidemics in the ghetto, an anti-epidemic section was created under the Jewish Ghetto Police leadership, led by Manfred Talmus. In November 1941, the Epidemic Company was established, headed by Mieczysław Szmerling.

In summer 1941, a Hospital Guard Unit of approximately 30–40 members was formed to oversee Jewish prisoners treated in ghetto hospitals.

The Jewish Ghetto Police's organizational structure was often artificially expanded to provide jobs for as many people as possible.

In June 1942, a decision was made to establish a Fire Brigade in the ghetto, responsible for extinguishing small and medium fires, as a Jewish Ghetto Police agency. It was to be led by Jakub Brendel and consist of 39 members. However, its formation was halted after the start of Grossaktion Warsaw on 22 July 1942.

== Uniforms, equipment, and service conditions ==
Jewish Ghetto Police members did not carry firearms. Their only weapon was a rubber or wooden baton. They were also equipped with whistles.

Jewish Ghetto Police members did not wear uniforms. Their primary distinguishing feature was a cap. Lower-ranking members wore navy blue caps with a light blue band; those with higher education had a white-and-blue cord around the band, along with the Jewish Ghetto Police emblem. The emblem was a grey steel hexagon featuring a six-pointed star and an inscription in Polish and German: "Jewish Council in Warsaw–Order Service". On their right arm, below the elbow, officers wore yellow armbands with the same inscription in Polish and German, their service number, and rank insignia. Lower-ranking members were required to display a metal service number visibly on their outer clothing. Officers also carried a service number but were not required to display it prominently. The cost of insignia was partially covered by the officers themselves and partially by various aid organizations.

Lower ranks were indicated on the cap by a silver galloon around the band and yellow studs on a black rectangle on the armband. Officer ranks were marked by one to four silver stars on a plush or velvet backing surrounded by silver braid. "Group leaders on plush", a transitional rank between lower and higher officers, wore three silver studs on a plush or velvet backing. Officers directing street traffic wore additional white sleeves. Doctors associated with the Jewish Ghetto Police were later permitted to wear the formation's cap with a Rod of Asclepius. Members of the Central Detention Center crew wore special badges with the letter "A" and a number inside.

Training for Jewish Ghetto Police candidates took place in the building of the closed Nożyk Synagogue at 6 Twarda Street. During the Jewish Ghetto Police's formation in late 1940 and early 1941, training was handled by the Reserve Unit, led by Albin Fleischman. Later, the service and training section, headed by Rafał Lederman, took over. Practical training focused almost exclusively on drill, later expanded to include crowd dispersal techniques (wedge formation). The theoretical training program, modeled on that of the Blue Police, was largely irrelevant to ghetto realities. Official rules and procedures for Jewish Ghetto Police operations were defined and published only in early June 1942.

Israel Gutman noted that the Jewish police was an entirely foreign concept to Jews living in the diaspora, as "the organized Jewish community had no prior experience in this area". According to Stanisław Adler, most Jewish Ghetto Police members wanted the formation to focus on serving the community, while the leadership, led by Szeryński, aimed to make it a militarized and disciplined force. Szeryński's efforts in this direction were met with suspicion by rank-and-file members and those who opposed his vision.

Service in the Jewish Ghetto Police came with several benefits and privileges. Amid the chronic unemployment in the ghetto, the opportunity for professional work was valuable in itself. Jewish Ghetto Police service offered protection from deportation to labour camps and requisitions, as well as the ability to leave the ghetto. Members received free medical care. From June 1941, they were allocated rationed bread equivalent to non-Jewish rations, and from January 1942, additional coupons for 12 kilograms of bread monthly. (Note: According to another source, from the moment the ghetto was closed, policemen were to receive an allotment of 10 kilograms of bread per month, which was formally regulated by an ordinance issued by Commissioner Heinz Auerswald on 26 February 1942 (Engelking & Leociak (2013, pp. 943–944)).) Jewish Ghetto Police service also provided informal privileges, such as securing auxiliary jobs for family members or supporting their smuggling or business activities.

Low wages, however, were a significant issue. Initially, the Judenrat paid salaries only to former Order Guard members from the Labour Battalion and a few Jewish Ghetto Police leaders, including Józef Szeryński and Stefan Lubliner. In November 1941, approximately 100 senior officers gained the right to salaries.

Some officers reported for duty weakened by hunger and wearing worn-out shoes. To address this, in April 1941, a special police tax was introduced: 0.30 PLN monthly per ghetto resident and 5 to 300 PLN monthly from shops and businesses. The Order Service Fund was established to collect this tax. The funds were intended to pay officers not on the Judenrat payroll, but the revenue proved insufficient. Officers received meager salaries (approximately 50–80 PLN), paid only every few months. Consequently, bribery became the primary income source for officers, with corruption tolerated by both the Judenrat and German authorities. Officers were also permitted to take additional paid work. A disciplinary section ("Inspection"), led by Seweryn Zylbersztajn, investigated corruption and abuses, imposing penalties such as warnings, fines, or suspensions.

In January 1941, the Mutual Aid for Order Service Officers was established, later renamed the Material Aid Section for Jewish Ghetto Police Officers (Sepor). It provided additional food rations from the Supply Agency or purchased outside the ghetto, supported sick or recovering officers, and assisted families of deceased officers. In June 1941, police taxes funded special police kitchens. (Note: There were six or seven of them (Engelking & Leociak (2013, p. 428)).) By late 1941, a support fund for families of deceased officers was created. Some district heads independently improved their subordinates' conditions by pressuring local businesses to share food rations or implementing "fair" profit-sharing from bribes and smuggling.

Jewish Ghetto Police service did not fully protect against German repression. Jewish officers were frequently humiliated and beaten by German Ordnungspolizei officers, especially those stationed at ghetto gates alongside German and Polish police. However, many Jewish officers collaborated with German guards, profiting from overlooking smuggling at the gates. This was risky, as officers had to bribe not only Germans but also Jewish informants and Polish police. German officers might refuse bribes and arrest the officer, or accept payment but confiscate smuggled goods and arrest the Jewish officer. Officers involved in smuggling disputes risked denunciation or attacks. Many were arrested for collaborating with smugglers. German killings and arrests of Jewish Ghetto Police members increased significantly in spring 1942.

The Jewish Ghetto Police leadership worked to foster a sense of group identity. In December 1940, a formation anthem was composed. Ceremonies and roll calls were held, including those honoring officers who died during the typhus epidemic. These events were attended by Blue Police officers, including commander Aleksander Reszczyński. The Jewish Ghetto Police had an orchestra, initially conducted by Szymon Kataszek and later by a Czech Jew named Paket, employing dozens of musicians. The orchestra performed at children's playgrounds opened in the ghetto in spring 1942 through the efforts of Judenrat chairman Adam Czerniaków.

== Activities ==
=== From the ghetto's creation to Grossaktion Warsaw ===
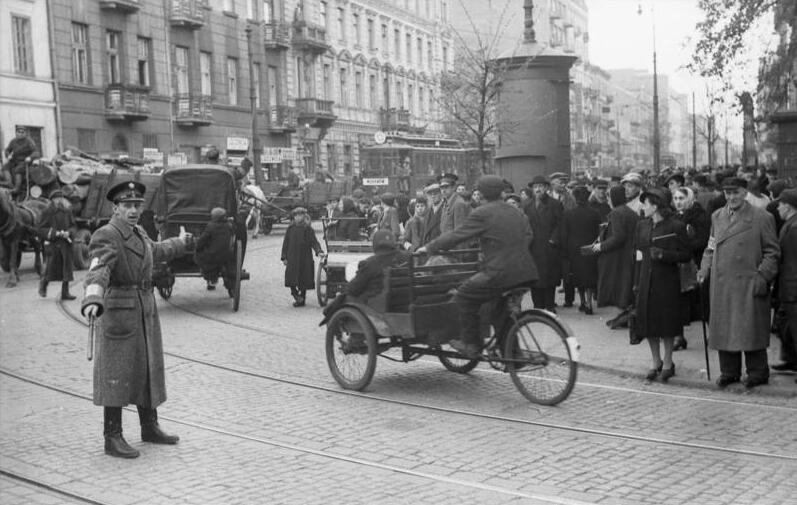
Jewish Ghetto Police officer directing street traffic at the intersection of Karmelicka Street and Leszno Street

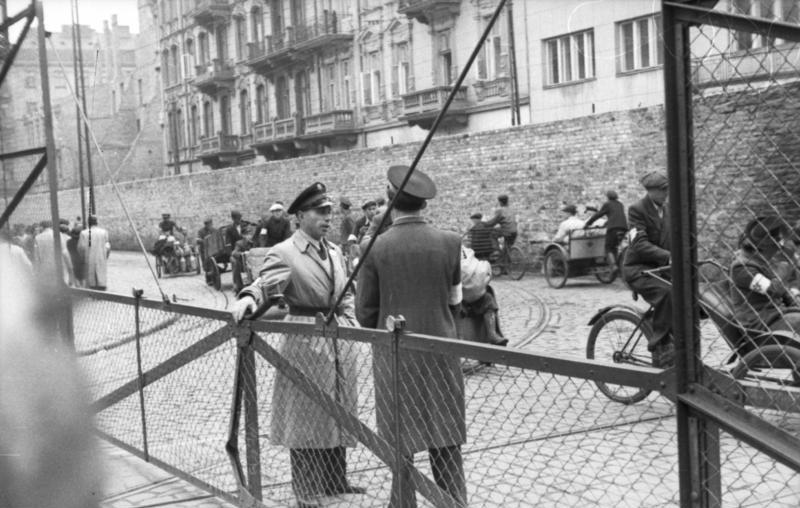
Jewish Ghetto Police officers on duty at the ghetto gate near the intersection of Żelazna Street and Chłodna Street

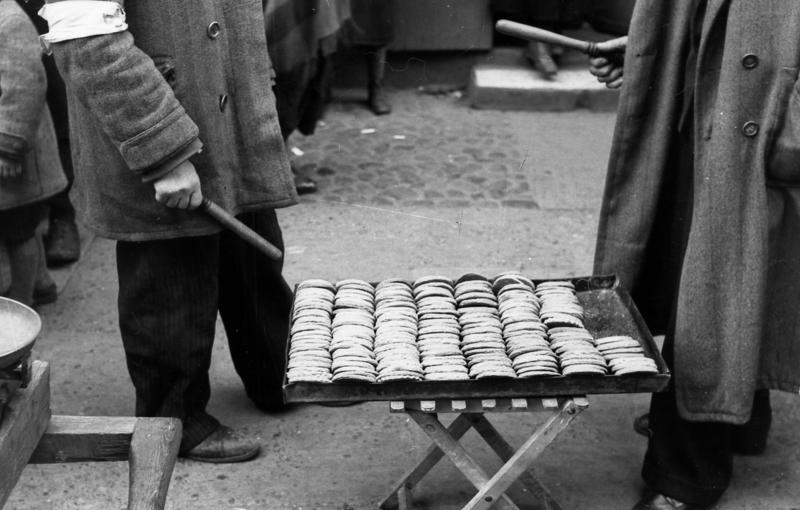
Jewish policeman (face not visible) inspecting street trade

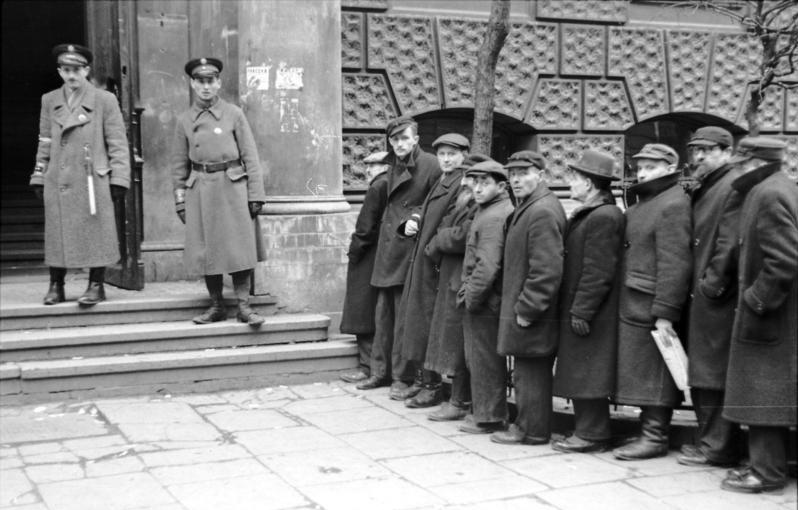
Jewish Ghetto Police officers (left) assisting with the registration of forced laborers

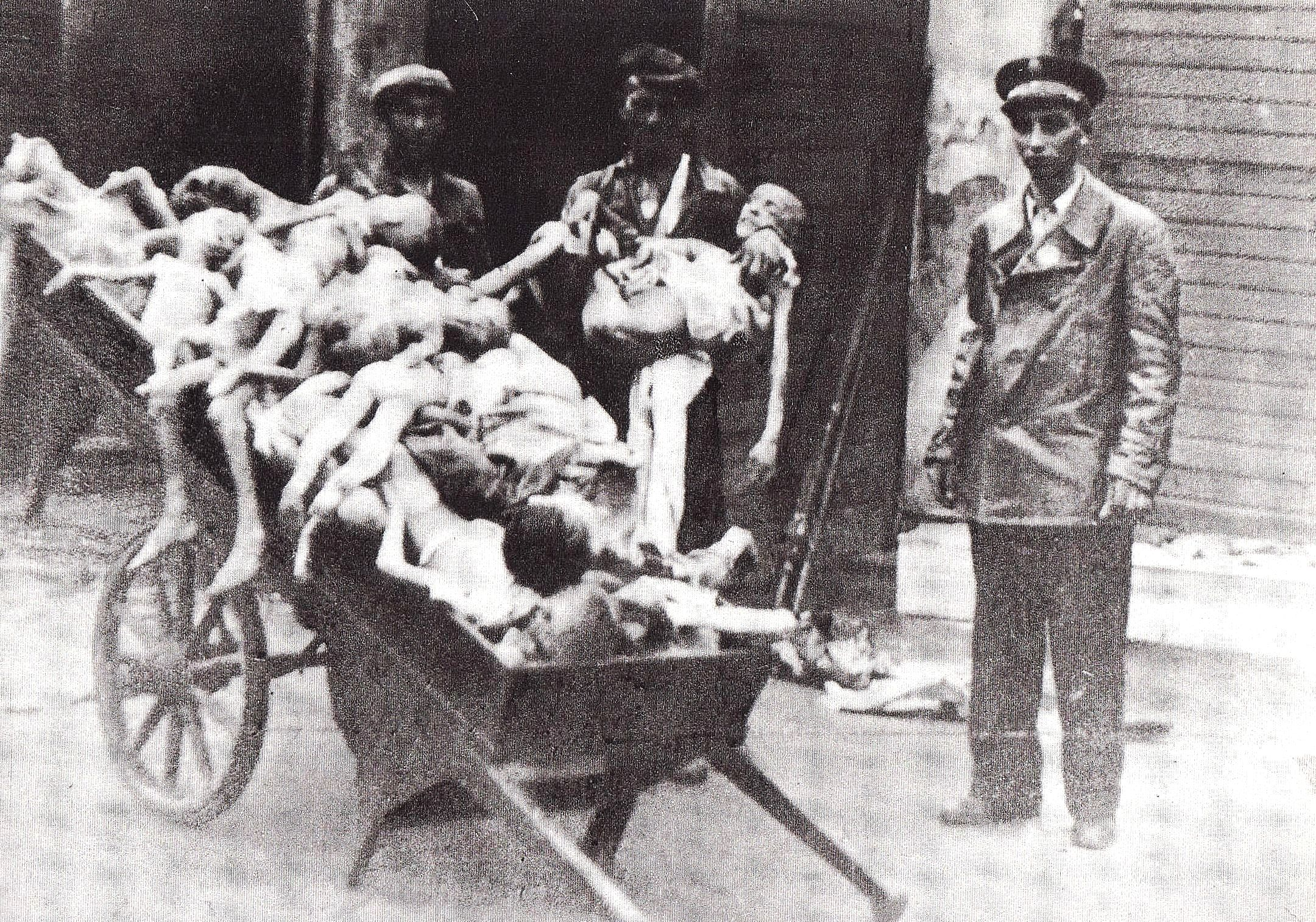
Jewish Ghetto Police officer with a cart carrying the bodies of children who died of starvation

Initially, the Jewish Ghetto Police operated from two rooms in the Main Building of the Jewish Community at 26/28 Grzybowska Street. By late November 1940, it received its own premises – seven rooms at 12 Prosta Street, owned by the Warsaw Merchants' Trade School. These proved too small and inadequate, so in January 1941, the leadership moved to 32 Krochmalna Street. From spring 1942 until late September 1942, the Jewish Ghetto Police headquarters was located at 17 Ogrodowa Street.

The Jewish Ghetto Police was not a police force in the full sense, as it performed only general order maintenance tasks. Combating criminal or political offenses was outside its jurisdiction. When a crime was reported, the Jewish Ghetto Police secured the scene and detained suspects, who were then handed over to the Blue Police. The Blue Police transferred suspects to the German or Polish judiciary, depending on the charges. In practice, most cases were resolved "internally" through Jewish Ghetto Police-mediated amicable settlements. No more than 60 suspects were formally handed over to the Blue Police monthly. According to a ghetto chronicler, the Jewish Ghetto Police handled nearly 150 cases daily through internal resolutions. To encourage settlements, officers sometimes used coercion, such as threats of imprisonment or assignment to undesirable tasks like cleaning toilets in refugee shelters.

One of the Jewish Ghetto Police's initial tasks, taken over from the Blue Police, was controlling prices and the trade of food and essential goods in the sealed district. In February 1941, on Blue Police orders, the Jewish Ghetto Police ceased these activities, which were assumed by the collaborationist Group 13. Relations between Jewish Ghetto Police officers and Group 13 members were cool but generally correct. Confusion arose because Group 13 members wore caps similar to those of the Jewish Ghetto Police, leading ghetto residents to mistake the two groups. After the Group 13 was dissolved in mid-1941, the Jewish Ghetto Police resumed price control duties.

From its inception, the Jewish Ghetto Police took over the Order Guard's role of maintaining order in public buildings, particularly Judenrat offices and agencies.

Daily, Jewish Ghetto Police officers patrolled assigned districts (day or night shifts) or staffed posts. There were 29 posts (22 permanent and 7 rotating). Their duties included regulating pedestrian traffic, overseeing street trade, removing obstacles to pedestrian and vehicular movement, reporting hazardous building or pavement damage, inspecting vehicles, horse-drawn carts, and rickshaws for safety compliance, enforcing air defense regulations, preventing gatherings, maintaining cleanliness of streets, sidewalks, courtyards, staircases, and public areas in residential buildings, preventing crimes and misdemeanors (especially theft), and intervening in cases of animal cruelty.

A key Jewish Ghetto Police task was guard duty at ghetto gates, where six-member posts were stationed: two German, two Polish, and two Jewish officers, rotating several times daily. Their duties included checking individuals and vehicles passing through the gates, preventing unauthorized access to ghetto walls or fences, and combating smuggling.

Another priority was sanitary inspections, critical due to typhus and other infectious disease outbreaks in the ghetto. Initially, selected officers were assigned these tasks ad hoc. Later, each district organized sanitary platoons, and in June 1941, an anti-epidemic section was established under the Jewish Ghetto Police leadership, led by deputy district officer Manfred Talmus. In November 1941, an Epidemic Company was formed, headed by Mieczysław Szmerling. Officers assigned to sanitary duties collaborated with health workers, assisting disinfection teams conducting disinfection ("steam baths") in homes and buildings with reported typhus cases. They also guarded residences and buildings under quarantine, staffed public bathhouses and Judenrat Health Department offices, participated in inspections, and identified typhus cases. They escorted quarantined individuals to baths for mandatory washing and back to their residences, using force if resistance was encountered. During peak typhus outbreaks, approximately 200 Jewish Ghetto Police officers were assigned to sanitary duties daily.

Jewish Ghetto Police officers regularly collected homeless or begging children from the streets. Overcrowded hospitals and care facilities often refused to accept them. On the officers' initiative, detention rooms were established, functioning effectively as boarding schools, typically housing from 30 to 40 children at a time. Six such rooms were created, with known addresses for four: 20 Nowolipie Street, 12 Nowolipki Street, 6 Gęsia Street, and 21 Chłodna Street. Funding for these facilities came from police orchestra concerts and, from January 1942, performances of a police puppet show by Jerzy Ryba (U nas w Rejonach…), staged in various ghetto entertainment venues. Jewish Ghetto Police officers often collaborated with CENTOS, and worked with Janusz Korczak, frequently visiting his Orphans' Home.

The Jewish Ghetto Police also performed other tasks assigned by the Germans and Judenrat, including collecting debts owed to the Judenrat by individuals, legal entities, or house committees, conducting evictions or rehousing tenants, assisting with requisitions or tax collection, conducting censuses (of people, items, vehicles, etc.), and escorting forced laborers to work sites outside the ghetto.

From the early days of the occupation, German authorities tasked the Judenrat with supplying forced laborers. As reports spread of poor living and sanitary conditions and mistreatment at forced labor camps and work sites, meeting German quotas became increasingly difficult. In February 1941, the Germans demanded 35,000 workers for camps in the Warsaw District and Lublin District. Two months later, due to low compliance, the Germans threatened to halt food supplies to the ghetto and convert existing labour camps into harsher penal camps. Roundups began in the ghetto. The first, on 16–17 April, was conducted by the Ordnungspolizei and Blue Police. A second major roundup on 14 May was primarily carried out by Jewish Ghetto Police officers, with detained Jews sent to camps near Krosno and Jasło. During roundups, Jewish Ghetto Police officers detained pedestrians, surrounded buildings to detain men inside, conducted raids in cafés, restaurants, and refugee shelters, and tracked individuals who ignored work summonses. Those detained for minor offenses were also sent to camps. An unverified report suggests officers were threatened with deportation to labour camps if they failed to meet quotas. As with the Labour Battalion, forced labor recruitment was rife with abuses. Jewish Ghetto Police officers accepted bribes (typically 1,000–3,000 PLN) to exempt individuals from deportation. Consequently, the poorest and least connected Jews were sent to camps. Officers also took bribes from families of detainees for delivering packages or information. In some cases, to meet quotas, officers detained exempt individuals, such as the sick or sole family providers. The roundups temporarily paralyzed ghetto life.

The brutality of camp guards, composed of Ukrainians and Poles (Lagerschutz), was a key reason Jews sought to avoid labour camps. In April 1941, at the request of Warsaw Jewish Council member Gustaw Wielikowski, the Warsaw Arbeitsamt permitted Jewish Ghetto Police officers to serve as camp guards. It is unclear how officers were selected for this role, but many were likely assigned under duress. Reports on their conduct vary: some suggest their presence improved treatment of forced laborers, while others describe brutal and corrupt guards. In the Piekiełko camp, Jewish Lagerschutz commander Landsberg and his subordinates reportedly beat workers and subjected them to exhausting drills. In the Pustków camp in Subcarpathia, Warsaw Jewish officers frequently beat prisoners. In May 1941, at the Drewnica camp, all Jewish guards and camp doctors were arrested for accepting bribes to issue work exemptions.

In June or July 1941, the "Central Arrest for the Jewish Residential District" was established in the ghetto, initially at 22 Gęsia Street. Due to the growing number of prisoners, it was expanded to include 10 large cells in the adjacent building at 24 Gęsia Street, part of the Volhynia Barracks. The lockup primarily held individuals accused of smuggling or illegally staying on the "Aryan side". Imprisonment was also possible for offenses like riding a tram without a ticket or violating air defense regulations. By late May 1942, nearly one-third of inmates were minors under 15. The detenction center was formally under Blue Police supervision, but Jewish Ghetto Police officers staffed it. The arrest was managed by Leopold Lindenfeld, a pre-war judge. In August 1941, the staff was expanded to include female guards. Though not formally Jewish Ghetto Police officers, they were subject to the formation's uniform, organizational, and disciplinary regulations. The women's section was led by Sylwia Hurwicz, a pre-war Łódź lawyer. Conditions in the arrest were harsh, with poor sanitation and frequent beatings by guards. Mortality was high; in March 1942, Adam Czerniaków estimated two deaths daily.

On 28–29 August 1941, Jewish Ghetto Police officers, alongside Ordnungspolizei and Blue Police officers, participated in a large-scale lice delousing operation at 15 Krochmalna Street. The operation became a "medical and humanitarian disaster", further damaging the Jewish Ghetto Police's reputation in the ghetto.

From autumn 1941, Jewish Ghetto Police officers were assigned as orderlies to German craft workshops (so-called szops) operating in the ghetto.

On 17 November and 15 December 1941, on orders from Commissioner Heinz Auerswald, executions of Central Detention Center prisoners were carried out, killing eight and fifteen people, respectively. Blue Police officers performed the shootings, while Jewish Ghetto Police officers escorted victims from cells and tied them to posts. Rumors in the ghetto claimed Szeryński strongly opposed his officers' involvement, even threatening suicide. Nonetheless, the ghetto residents' hostility toward Jewish officers intensified.

On the night of 17–18 April 1942, the Gestapo killed 52 people on the ghetto streets. The Jewish Ghetto Police leadership was at least partially informed of the planned action. According to a Government Delegation for Poland report, on the evening of 17 April, the Germans ordered 18 German-speaking Jewish Ghetto Police officers to report to the Pawiak gate and a 40-member platoon for special duties. During the massacre, Jewish officers served as guides for the Gestapo, assisted in removing victims from apartments, and later cleared bodies from the streets. On 19 April, at Czerniaków's order, the Jewish Ghetto Police issued a statement claiming the German action was "sporadic, aimed at punishing those engaged in unauthorized activities" and urging calm.

In April 1942, on Czerniaków's orders, Jewish Ghetto Police officers raided shops displaying luxury food items. Similar requisitions followed in restaurants frequented by ghetto elites. Czerniaków distributed the confiscated goods to orphanages, shelters, or street children.

On 1 May 1942, Jewish Ghetto Police commander Józef Szeryński was arrested by the Germans for allegedly hiding his wife's furs on the "Aryan side". Czerniaków, according to the Germans, did everything possible to secure his release, as did the Blue Police leadership, but these efforts failed, and Szeryński was imprisoned in Pawiak. On 5 May, Jakub Lejkin was appointed acting commander.

In May and June 1942, another wave of labour camp roundups occurred in the ghetto. Concurrently, possibly linked to the start of Operation Reinhard, German terror against ghetto residents intensified. Jewish Ghetto Police brutality also increased, though it is unclear whether this was due to German orders or the new leadership's zeal. In the first week of June alone, Jewish Ghetto Police officers detained 771 people. On direct orders from Commissioner Auerswald, they conducted a "hunt for small game", targeting begging children on the streets. Some reports indicate they assisted in summary executions of smugglers caught at the ghetto walls. Jewish officers also faced increased German violence, with rising arrests and killings. In April 1942, four officers were reported killed and eight arrested; in May, four killed and seven arrested; and in June and early July, seven killed and 26 arrested.

In May 1942, a German crew filmed a film in the ghetto to depict its residents according to Goebbels' propaganda requirements. Jewish Ghetto Police officers were enlisted to assist the filmmakers.

Proposals to establish a criminal police unit within the Jewish Ghetto Police emerged periodically. On 3 June 1942, Gazeta Żydowska reported the creation of a "criminal investigation section" within the Jewish Ghetto Police leadership. Katarzyna Person notes that little is known about its activities. The article stated that the Jewish Ghetto Police was authorized to investigate "common criminal offenses prosecuted by the Polish Police and offenses against the Jewish Council and its institutions" and to detain suspects temporarily.

According to a 3 June 1942 Gazeta Żydowska article, the Jewish Ghetto Police employed 2,000 people at that time. However, Barbara Engelking states that by July 1942, the force numbered 2,500.

On 1 or 2 July 1942, 110 people detained for violating various German regulations were deported from the Central Detention Center and executed in Babice near Warsaw, including 10 Jewish Ghetto Police officers. Accounts of their arrests vary. Post-war German police testimonies suggest the executed officers collaborated with smugglers and were selected based on reports from German officers at the ghetto walls.

=== Grossaktion Warsaw ===
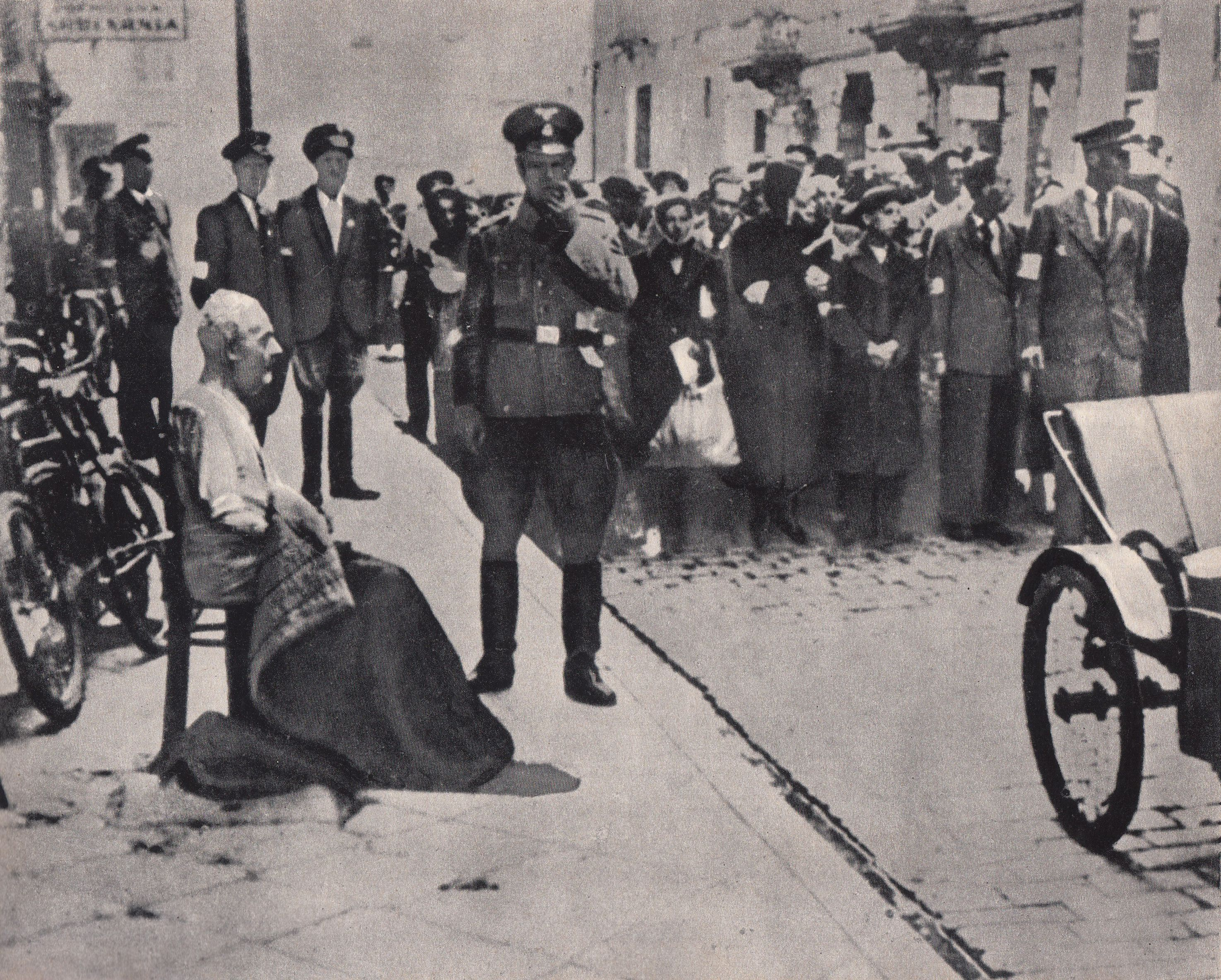
Warsaw Ghetto during Grossaktion Warsaw. A column of Jews escorted by German and Jewish policemen

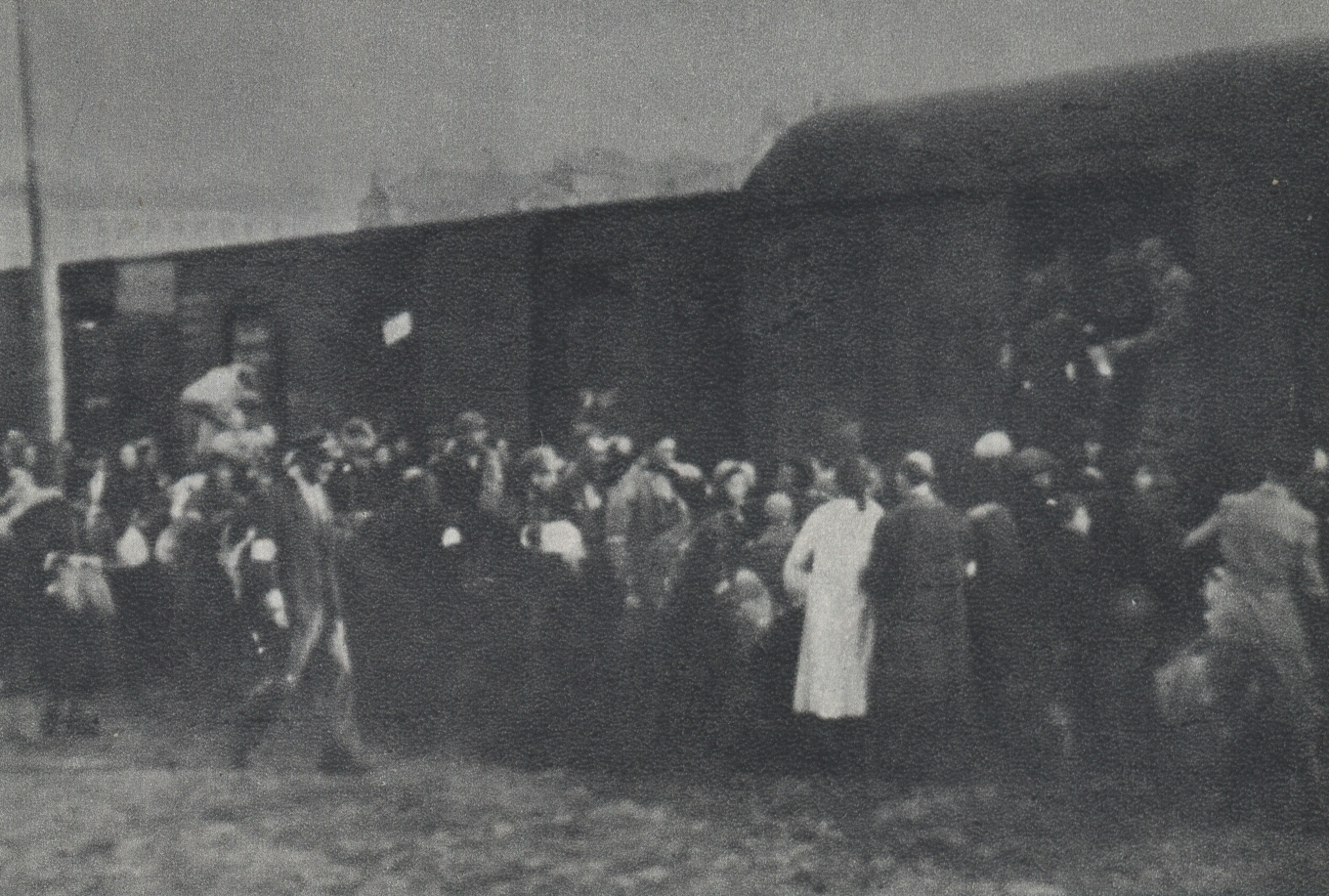
Umschlagplatz, preparing a transport to the Treblinka extermination camp. A Jewish Ghetto Police officer is visible in the foreground

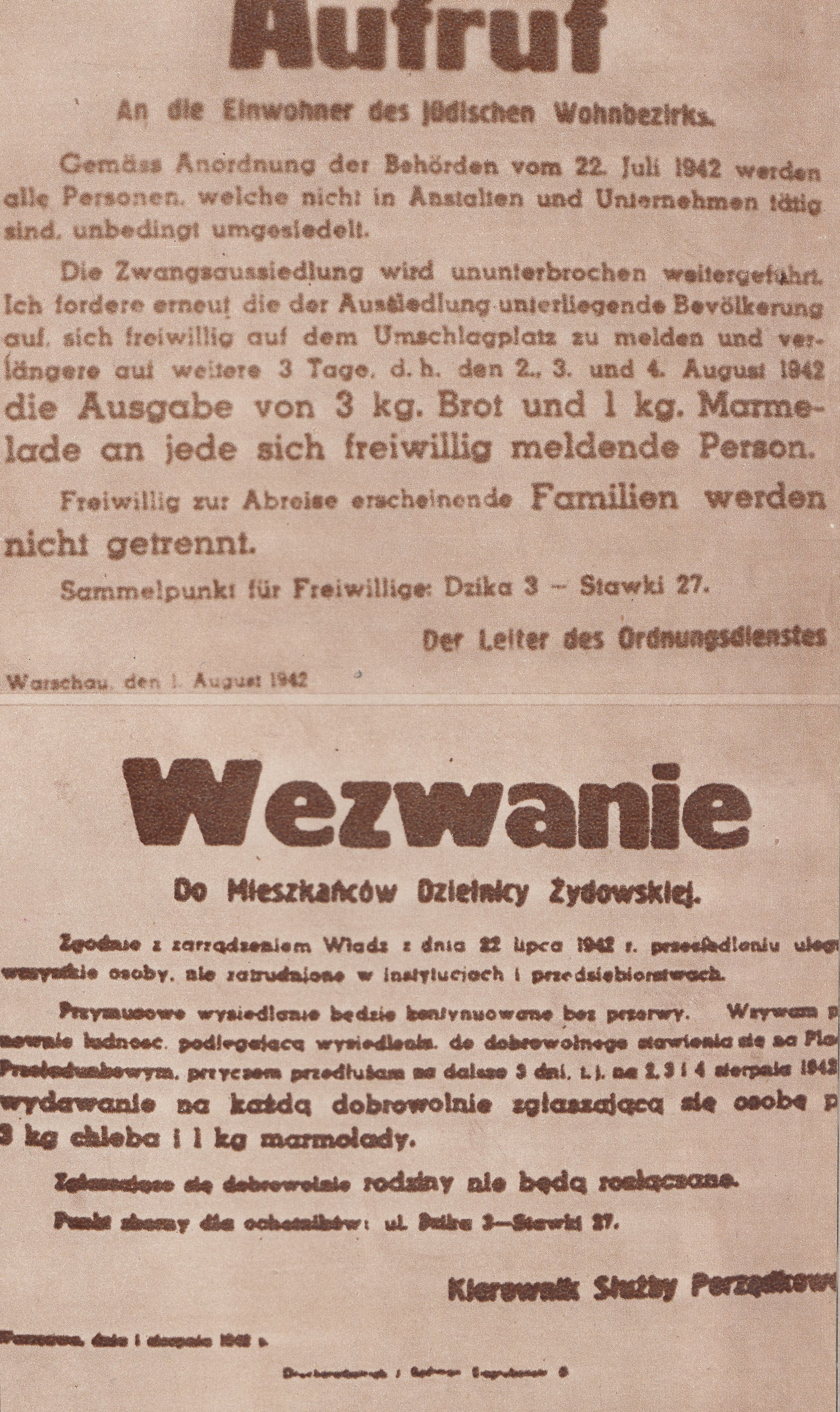
Announcement by the Jewish Ghetto Police commander dated 1 August 1942, stating that those voluntarily reporting to Umschlagplatz would receive 3 kg of bread and 1 kg of marmalade

In the second half of July 1942, rumors of an impending "resettlement" intensified in the Warsaw Ghetto. Judenrat chairman Adam Czerniaków attempted to discern German intentions, but both Warsaw Gestapo officers and Commissioner Heinz Auerswald assured him they knew nothing of such plans and dismissed the rumors. Trusting their assurances, Czerniaków instructed acting Jewish Ghetto Police commander Jakub Lejkin to announce via loudspeakers that ghetto residents had no cause for concern.

However, on 21 July 1942, 60 prominent ghetto figures were arrested. The next day, the ghetto walls were surrounded by posts of the Blue Police and Hiwi. Around 9:00 AM or 10:00 AM, a group of SS officers arrived at the Judenrat headquarters at 26/28 Grzybowska Street. They hastily convened a Judenrat meeting attended by Czerniaków, Lejkin, and a few non-arrested council members. The meeting was led by SS-Hauptsturmführer Hermann Höfle, head of the German "deportation staff" from Lublin, who informed them that, with certain exceptions, Warsaw's Jews would be deported "to the East". The Judenrat was made responsible for informing the population of the "resettlement" and delivering 6,000 people daily to the Umschlagplatz. The Germans warned that sabotaging their orders would be punishable by death. That day, the first transport left Umschlagplatz for the Treblinka extermination camp.

The deportation was overseen by two German deportation staffs. The "Warsaw staff", composed of Warsaw Gestapo officers, set up its headquarters in the Jewish Ghetto Police leadership offices at 17 Ogrodowa Street. The "Lublin staff", consisting of SS officers from the Operation Reinhard headquarters in Lublin, was based in a building at 103 Żelazna Street, later known as the Befehlstelle. Several Jewish Ghetto Police officers, including the Czapliński brothers, served at the Befehlstelle.

The Germans designated the Jewish Ghetto Police as the primary executor of the deportation. Likely on the first day of Grossaktion Warsaw, Józef Szeryński returned as Jewish Ghetto Police commander. His release from Pawiak was reportedly at Lejkin's request or, according to another account, on the orders of SS-Untersturmführer Karl Georg Brandt, head of the "Jewish section". Szeryński was appointed chief commander of the Jewish Ghetto Police and "plenipotentiary for resettlement". However, his authority was diminished, as he now shared power with Lejkin ("technical commander") and Mieczysław Szmerling. Additionally, on 22 July, on the orders of SS-Hauptsturmführer Hermann Worthoff from the Lublin deportation staff, Józef Ehrlich was appointed deputy commander. On 23 July, Adam Czerniaków committed suicide. From that moment, the Judenrat lost its influence, and the Jewish Ghetto Police leadership, though merely a tool of the German deportation staffs, became the most powerful entity in the ghetto.

During the first week of Grossaktion Warsaw, the Germans and their Eastern collaborators generally stayed in the background, entrusting Jewish Ghetto Police officers with delivering the daily quota of "resettlers" to Umschlagplatz. In return, Jewish Ghetto Police officers, their wives, and children were officially exempt from deportation and received certificates protecting them from transport to Treblinka. On the first day, Jewish Ghetto Police officers, led by group leader Seweryn Spotkowski (a pre-war lawyer and head of the "Commune" company), brought residents of the so-called refugee town at 1/3/5 Dzika Street to Umschlagplatz, including children and youths from the local boarding school and dormitory. They also included several hundred Central Detention Center prisoners and begging children apprehended on the streets. From the next day, Jewish Ghetto Police officers conducted "blockades" of specific buildings, starting with tenements on Miła, Ludwik Zamenhof, and Muranowska streets. The addresses of buildings to be blockaded were provided to Lejkin by the Germans, typically the evening before.

All Jewish Ghetto Police officers, except office staff, were deployed for the deportation. In the initial phase, blockades typically involved 20–30 officers led by an officer. Mieczysław Szmerling, promoted to district officer on the orders of SS-Untersturmführer Brandt, was appointed daytime manager of Umschlagplatz. Salomon Kosman, former deputy head of the Labour Battalion, was named nighttime manager. A special "loading" group, led by deputy district officer Mieczysław Brzeziński, was tasked with forcing people into train cars and counting the number of Jews deported to Treblinka each day. Alongside Jewish Ghetto Police officers, members of the Jewish Emergency Service (a former Group 13 agency) and seconded Judenrat clerks served at Umschlagplatz and participated in street roundups. In summer 1942, Jewish Ghetto Police officers, along with cart drivers, rickshaw operators, and gravediggers, were among the few ghetto residents who enjoyed relative personal safety until nearly the end of Grossaktion Warsaw.

On 29 July, posters signed by Szeryński were displayed in the ghetto, announcing that those voluntarily reporting to Umschlagplatz by 31 July would receive 3 kg of bread and 1 kg of marmalade. Many Jews, desperate from hunger, heeded this call.

From 29 July, likely due to increasing difficulties in meeting quotas, the Germans and Hiwi became more directly involved in the deportation. Blockades now included approximately 10–20 German SS officers, 50–100 Eastern Hiwi, and 250–350 Jewish policemen. They set out each morning around 7:00–7:30 AM from the Jewish Ghetto Police headquarters at 17 Ogrodowa Street. The Jewish Ghetto Police's primary task became escorting captured Jews to Umschlagplatz, using rickshaws and horse-drawn trams. Between 4 and 6 August, they brought children from ghetto orphanages and boarding schools, including Janusz Korczak's Orphans' Home, to Umschlagplatz. In mid-August, Lejkin, on German orders, mandated that each Jewish Ghetto Police officer deliver five people daily to Umschlagplatz, under threat of execution or deportation to Treblinka with their families for non-compliance. From 19–24 August, while the Germans were occupied with liquidating nearby ghettos, the Jewish Ghetto Police independently organized blockades.

On 6 August, Jewish Ghetto Police officers were ordered to relocate with their wives and children to a barbed-wire-enclosed "police block" between Karmelicka, Nowolipki, and Dzielna streets. Designated "trustees" and residents ensured only officers and their immediate families could enter.

From the outset of Grossaktion Warsaw, instances of spontaneous resistance against Jewish Ghetto Police officers were recorded. On 20 August, Izrael Kanal, a former policeman and member of the Jewish Combat Organization, attempted to assassinate Józef Szeryński. The attack failed, leaving Szeryński only wounded. Nevertheless, it was the first armed action by the Jewish underground in the ghetto, profoundly impacting the population. That same month, another Jewish Combat Organization fighter, Henoch Gutman, attempted unsuccessfully to assassinate Mieczysław Szmerling.

The safety guarantees granted to Jewish policemen proved illusory. On the night of 5–6 September, the Judenrat was ordered to post notices summoning all Jews to assemble on 6 September, under penalty of death, in an area bounded by Smocza, Gęsia, Zamenhof, and Szczęśliwa streets, and Parysowski Square. Different groups were assigned specific assembly points, followed by a two-day registration. The Germans decided only 32,000 Jews could remain in the ghetto. Heads of enterprises and institutions received 32,000 "life numbers" to distribute among their workers, with the rest to be deported to Treblinka. During these events, known as the "Cauldron on Miła", the Judenrat was allocated 2,000 life numbers, with 500 for Jewish Ghetto Police officers – half for the officers themselves and half for their wives and auxiliary staff.

The selection of Jewish Ghetto Police officers took place on the odd-numbered side of Wołyńska Street. A special committee of four officers decided who would remain in service or be dismissed. During the distribution of life numbers, Szeryński and the Czapliński brothers were held as hostages in the Jewish Ghetto Police offices at Ogrodowa Street. Some dismissed officers became forced laborers. Thirty were immediately sent to work at the Ostbahn workshops in Praga, and 50, with their wives, were billeted the next day at the City Tram Workshops on Młynarska Street. The remaining dismissed officers were divided into two groups and housed with their families in "police blocks" at Lubecki and Ostrowska streets. Those in the former were soon deported to Treblinka. On 21 September, a blockade occurred at the police block on Ostrowska Street. Dismissed officers, escorted by Lejkin and Szmerling, were taken to Umschlagplatz. That same day, the final transport of Grossaktion Warsaw, carrying 2,196 people, including families of dismissed officers, left for Treblinka. The officers themselves were later deported to the Majdanek concentration camp.

=== From Grossaktion Warsaw to the Warsaw Ghetto Uprising ===
Officers who received "life numbers" were billeted with their wives at Nowolipki Street. Some managed to secretly smuggle their children into these quarters. After the boundaries of the "residual ghetto" (German: Restgetto) were redefined, they were relocated to buildings at Ludwik Zamenhof Street (numbers 30 to 40). The Jewish Ghetto Police leadership established its new headquarters at 4 Gęsia Street. According to Oneg Shabbat informants, by December 1942, the Jewish Ghetto Police numbered 240 officers. (Note: Gutman (1993, p. 292) reports that after the end of Grossaktion Warsaw, the number of Jewish Ghetto Police officers was reduced to 380.) Although Józef Szeryński formally remained the commander, his actual role was limited, as he had not regained mental stability following the assassination attempt on his life.

After Grossaktion Warsaw, the Jewish Ghetto Police's primary tasks shifted to regulating street traffic and performing patrol duties. Officers also escorted columns of workers returning to the so-called central ghetto after work in the szops. Officially, their role included combating smuggling, for which they stationed guards at sewer exits. Six officers, including Marceli Czapliński, were permanently assigned to the Befehlstelle at 103 Żelazna Street, where Karl Georg Brandt and other Warsaw Gestapo officers were based. There, Jewish policemen handled administrative tasks and guard duties in the detention facility. Despite the drastic changes in the ghetto's situation, many officers continued to benefit from their privileged status, often engaging in smuggling. This also applied to those who transitioned from the Jewish Ghetto Police to factory guard units (Werkschutz) in the szops. Jewish Ghetto Police officers were among the few Jews still able to move relatively freely through the ghetto streets.

In the autumn of 1942 and winter of 1942/43, members of the Jewish underground carried out a series of assassinations targeting Jewish Ghetto Police officers. These actions aimed to punish those who had collaborated most zealously with the Germans during Grossaktion Warsaw and to eliminate collaborators who could hinder resistance efforts during future deportations. On 29 October 1942, Jewish Combat Organization fighter Eliasz Różański shot and killed deputy Jewish Ghetto Police commander Jakub Lejkin on Gęsia Street and slightly wounded his companion, Stanisław Czapliński. This event reverberated widely in the ghetto, instilling widespread fear among policemen. Shortly after, Jewish Military Union fighters killed Jerzy Furstenberg, a former aide to Marian Häendel. In January 1943, a series of attacks on former Jewish Ghetto Police officers occurred at the Hallman szop at 59 Nowolipki Street, including an incident where one policeman was doused with hydrochloric acid. These attacks were carried out by Jewish Combat Organization fighters.

From 18–21 January 1943, the so-called January Action took place, during which at least 6,000 Jews were deported to the Treblinka extermination camp or shot on the ghetto streets.

During this action, the Germans no longer relied on the Jewish Ghetto Police to organize blockades or assemble transports at the Umschlagplatz. However, SS officers occasionally took small groups of Jewish policemen – ranging from a few to a dozen – from the Jewish Ghetto Police headquarters at Gęsia Street to serve as scouts or "human shields" to protect against Jewish Combat Organization fighters' bullets. According to Emanuel Ringelblum, the Germans' fear of Jewish fighters was so great that "they were afraid to enter Jewish apartments and sent Jewish Ghetto Police officers to scout. Only when the Jewish Ghetto Police confirmed no armed Jews were present did the gendarmes enter to conduct thorough searches". Jewish Ghetto Police officers were also forced to announce Nazi authorities' orders to the population. A noticeable lack of zeal in carrying out German orders was observed among the policemen, leading to one officer reportedly being killed by the SS. During the January Action, many policemen hid in bunkers alongside other ghetto residents.

On 23 January, two days after the action ended, Józef Szeryński committed suicide by taking potassium cyanide. His deputy, Leon Piżyc, who had been appointed after Lejkin's death, became the new Jewish Ghetto Police commander. Herman Kac was appointed deputy commander. According to a Judenrat report, after the January Action, the Jewish Ghetto Police consisted of 82 officers, including 10 women. The formation's headquarters was relocated to the Judenrat's offices in the Volhynia Barracks at 19 Zamenhof Street.

Officially, the policemen's duties included guarding workshops and warehouses and performing day and night patrols. In practice, after the January Action, Jewish Ghetto Police activities began to wane. The Central Arrest was dissolved. Many officers fled to the "Aryan side", while others joined the Werkschutz or Werterfassungsstelle. (Note: It was an SS-run institution, established after the end of Grossaktion Warsaw and employing Jewish workers. It was responsible for clearing out abandoned apartments and premises in the ghetto of all valuable items. These items were then collected, sorted, and sent to Germany (Engelking & Leociak (2013, pp. 250, 1458)).) In February 1943, the entire "Commune" unit was transferred to the Werkschutz. Approximately 50 officers found employment at a work site in Praga. Meanwhile, the Jewish resistance continued targeting Jewish Ghetto Police officers. On 26 February, the Jewish Combat Organization executed Mieczysław Brzeziński, who had led the "loaders" at Umschlagplatz during Grossaktion Warsaw.

On 19 April 1943, the Germans began the final liquidation of the ghetto, met with armed resistance from the Jewish underground. That day, Jewish Ghetto Police officers were ordered to report to the ghetto gate at Nalewki Street. The Germans had come from outside the ghetto walls where loud shots from machine guns were heard, arriving in armed vehicles and tanks. The resistance that was met with the Germans, were from The Jewish Fighting Organization [ZOB] and The Jewish Military Union (ZZW) . These members of The Jewish Fighting Organization, made sure to put up strong defense in the buildings that the Germans were walking through to find and kill Jewish people. As during the January Action, in the uprising's early days, the Germans used Jewish policemen as scouts and "human shields". They also performed auxiliary duties during the formation of initial transports at Umschlagplatz and guarded abandoned houses to prevent looting by the Blue Police. During the uprising, approximately a dozen policemen were shot by Jewish underground fighters. Ultimately, Jewish Ghetto Police officers shared the fate of other Jews. On 30 April, or according to some sources, the night of 28–29 April, several dozen officers, including commander Leon Piżyc, were taken by the Germans to the Pawiak area and executed. Some were also deported to camps in Treblinka and Majdanek.

== Opinion in the ghetto ==
=== Accusations of corruption and brutality ===
Initially, most Warsaw Ghetto residents viewed the Jewish Ghetto Police neutrally or even favorably. The Jewish Ghetto Police's popularity was evident in the fact that a toy Jewish policeman's uniform became a fashionable children's item in the ghetto. Even Emanuel Ringelblum, creator of the underground Ghetto Archive and later a staunch critic of the Jewish Ghetto Police, wrote a few kind words about its officers in his diary in late 1940.

Unlike the widely despised, collaborationist Group 13, ghetto residents were inclined to see Jewish Ghetto Police officers as representatives of the Jewish administration. The integration of 200 former Group 13 members into the Jewish Ghetto Police in the summer of 1941 led to a slight decline in its public image.

Service in the Jewish Ghetto Police was one of the most sought-after jobs in the Warsaw Ghetto. It was widely – and accurately – believed that securing a position required paying bribes to senior Jewish Ghetto Police officers or members of the Blue Police. Only candidates with exceptional connections could join without paying. Non-uniformed and auxiliary staff positions were almost exclusively reserved for families of senior Jewish Ghetto Police officers or those with the right connections. Corruption also permeated the Jewish Ghetto Police's personnel policies, with officers commonly paying bribes for promotions or transfers to wealthier districts. Numerous abuses were reported within Sepor, the institution created to support Jewish Ghetto Police officers. Its head, Marceli Czapliński, and close associates allegedly embezzled funds and sold food and goods meant for the poorest officers on the black market. Perceptions of corruption and recruitment irregularities were reinforced by the fact that the Jewish Ghetto Police was initially overseen by councilor Leopold Kupczykier, widely regarded as particularly corrupt.

Józef Szeryński faced accusations of nepotism from some officers, who claimed he granted promotions and privileges to his protégés while harshly targeting disobedient or critical subordinates. His status as a convert stirred significant controversy in the ghetto, with rumors circulating about his alleged antisemitism. His leadership of the Jewish Ghetto Police was seen by some as evidence of assimilationists seizing control in the ghetto. His close social ties with Blue Police officers, despite being confined to the ghetto, were viewed critically. His arrest in May 1942 was met with great satisfaction by the ghetto's public. A widespread belief in the ghetto held that Szeryński aimed to transform the Jewish Ghetto Police into a "Jewish legion" subordinate to a future Polish army. Some officers were reportedly told the police would participate in a future Polish uprising against the occupiers.

The Jewish Ghetto Police's regulations and later internal rules strictly prohibited officers from gaining personal or financial benefits. However, for officers who, in most cases, received no salary, bribes became their primary income source. Corruption was pervasive, infiltrating all aspects of Jewish Ghetto Police operations. Both the Jewish Ghetto Police leadership and the Judenrat, as well as German authorities, tacitly tolerated this. Group pressure also contributed to the prevalence of corrupt practices. Officers regularly extorted payments from ghetto entrepreneurs and demanded bribes from ordinary residents for favors or overlooking violations, fostering a negative image of the Jewish Ghetto Police and fueling often exaggerated rumors of its corruption and demoralization.

Anti-epidemic duties provided numerous opportunities for corruption and abuse. Officers charged residents for warnings about upcoming "steam baths" (disinfections). Some destroyed health officers' reports of infectious diseases or secretly exempted residents from bathhouse disinfection or quarantine in exchange for bribes. The Jewish Ghetto Police's involvement in the large-scale, tragically concluded delousing operation at 15 Krochmalna Street on 28–29 August 1941 further damaged its reputation. Officers were criticized for not warning residents, failing to prevent looting of vacated apartments by disinfection crews, accepting bribes from those who could afford them, and brutally treating the poorest tenants.

Guard duty at ghetto gates was considered particularly lucrative. Officers stationed there, nicknamed "musicians" – from the ghetto saying "szafa gra" ("it's all good", literally "the wardrobe plays") – often collaborated with smugglers bringing food and contraband into the ghetto. The Jewish population was relatively lenient toward this form of corruption, as smuggling mitigated the ghetto's hunger crisis. However, "musicians" who allowed large shipments linked to organized gangs and influential underworld figures while harshly treating individual, unconnected smugglers – especially children and youths – were condemned.

Corruption was also rampant in the Central Detention Center. While its head, Leopold Lindenfeld, enjoyed a positive reputation, bribery was commonplace among lower-ranking staff. Wealthy or well-connected prisoners could secure family packages, placement in less crowded cells, temporary passes, or early release through guards' mediation.

Katarzyna Person notes that some officers and collaborators profited from prostitution in the ghetto. In January 1942, the underground Bund newspaper Der Weker. Informacje Biuletin reported on the so-called cemetery scandal, also known as the "dentists' affair". According to the paper, gravediggers, with Jewish Ghetto Police officers' assistance, opened fresh graves to extract gold teeth from the deceased. According to Stanisław Adler's memoirs, the Judenrat hushed up the affair, fearing that turning the culprits over to the Germans would result in their execution.

Jewish Ghetto Police officers were widely regarded as demoralized beneficiaries of occupation conditions, exploiting their position at the expense of the Jewish community. Ghetto chroniclers condemned their ostentatious consumption, frequenting entertainment venues, fraternizing with underworld figures, and alcohol abuse. Most Jewish Ghetto Police leadership resided on the ghetto's most prestigious streets, such as Sienna Street, Leszno Street, Chłodna Street, Elektoralna Street, and Grzybów Square. (Note: However, this did not apply to the commander of the Jewish Ghetto Police himself, Józef Szeryński, who, throughout his time in the Warsaw Ghetto, reportedly lived with his wife and daughter in a sublet room (Person (2018, p. 147)).) Many officers' fondness for wearing high boots ("officer boots") was seen as imitation or psychological identification with the Nazis. In reality, these behaviors were limited to a subset of officers, particularly those deeply involved in smuggling and other illicit activities. Many rank-and-file officers lived modestly, even those taking bribes, as these were irregular and often pooled and distributed based on rank. Over time, strong tensions developed between rank-and-file officers and the leadership, though open defiance was rare, possibly due to severe penalties for insubordination.

The "Instructions for the Order Service" permitted officers to use force but prohibited its use without necessity. In practice, violence, often brutal, was an integral part of Jewish Ghetto Police operations. Unconfirmed reports suggest at least two deaths resulted from beatings by officers. The poorest and most vulnerable – refugees, deportees, and street children – were most exposed to violence. Incidents of officers openly robbing them were reported. Officers sometimes blockaded entire tenements until House Committees paid overdue taxes or fees to the Judenrat. The ghetto public was particularly outraged when officers sought German assistance to punish or coerce other Jews.

The Jewish Ghetto Police was not a monolithic group, and examples of positive behavior existed. Some Central Detention Center staff, alongside corrupt and brutal officers, selflessly delivered packages and information to prisoners or aided escapes. Some officers resigned, unwilling to participate in immoral or criminal activities, while others collaborated with the Jewish resistance.

=== Efforts to improve discipline and the formation's image ===
The Jewish Ghetto Police leadership was aware of the formation's disciplinary issues. On 21–22 December 1940, commander Szeryński conducted a final personnel review, publicly dismissing 55 officers. However, for unknown reasons, 41 were reinstated shortly after.

The Jewish Ghetto Police operated an "Inspection" unit under Seweryn Zylbersztajn, tasked with monitoring officers' conduct during and after duty. Upon detecting violations, it could issue warnings or refer cases to the disciplinary-order section, led successively by Mieczysław Goldstein and Henryk Nowogródzki, which served as the Jewish Ghetto Police's internal judicial body. This section could impose reprimands, fines, demotions, suspensions, or dismissals. Between June 1941 and July 1942, it issued 996 disciplinary rulings. However, the Inspection and disciplinary section's actions were inadequate to the scale of the problems and had little impact on the Jewish Ghetto Police's operations. Many officers believed these bodies were used to settle personal scores and focused on minor infractions by rank-and-file officers while protecting the interests of a small group of senior officers. Concealing systemic violations may also have been driven by the fear that reporting them could lead to officers being handed over to the Germans, resulting in their death.

Rank-and-file officers also recognized the need to improve the Jewish Ghetto Police's morale and image. Several memoranda were sent to Judenrat chairman Adam Czerniaków, one of which survives in the Oneg Shabbat archives. The authors demanded guaranteed salaries, clearer rules on the use of force, expanded powers for the Inspection and disciplinary section, and the removal of demoralized or incompetent officers. These efforts led to a new Service Instruction and the establishment of a Qualification Committee to review officers. On 12 June 1942, Czerniaków decided to dismiss over 100 officers, though this decision was likely not implemented.

The magazine Gazeta Żydowska actively worked to shape a positive image of the Jewish Ghetto Police. However, all efforts to improve the situation within the Jewish Ghetto Police and repair its reputation proved too late and insufficient.

=== Accusations of alienation, collaboration, and complicity in the Holocaust ===
The turning point in the growing alienation of Jewish Ghetto Police officers from the ghetto community was the spring of 1941, when they participated in roundups for forced labor. Their brutality and corruption during these forced labor drafts provoked outrage. Emanuel Ringelblum wrote that the Judenrat and Jewish Ghetto Police were marked by a "badge of shame" for their role. Abraham Lewin and other ghetto chroniclers compared Jewish Ghetto Police officers to Jewish "catchers" who, under Tsar Nicholas I, assisted in conscripting Jews into the Imperial Russian Army. However, participation in roundups also sparked controversy within the Jewish Ghetto Police itself. According to Ringelblum, a delegation of Jewish Ghetto Police officers petitioned the Judenrat to stop using them for this "dirty work", with some reportedly declaring they would rather go to labor camps themselves than continue the roundups. (Note: Person (2018, p. 156) is inclined to regard this account as an expression of wishful thinking on the part of the ghetto inhabitants.)

Over time, the Jewish Ghetto Police was increasingly seen by ghetto residents as dominated by assimilated Jews who disdained the Jewish masses and felt no solidarity with them. The widespread hostility toward the police fostered a psychological phenomenon of "closing ranks", reinforcing officers' sense of separateness from the Jewish population.

The Jewish Ghetto Police's assistance in the executions of Central Detention Center prisoners in November and December 1941 provoked widespread outrage. Although the Blue Police, not Jewish Ghetto Police officers, fired the shots, many Jews viewed the latter as zealous Nazi collaborators. The Jewish Ghetto Police's involvement in the German-ordered roundup of begging children in the spring of 1942 further erased "all previous merits of the Jewish Ghetto Police in aiding children".

Participation in Grossaktion Warsaw in the summer of 1942 made the Jewish Ghetto Police an object of universal hatred. Officers were completely ostracized from the ghetto community. Witnesses consistently noted that during deportations to the Treblinka extermination camp, Jewish Ghetto Police officers diligently, even zealously, carried out German orders, likely hoping to save themselves and their families. During the action, they earned the nickname "dachshunds" for their effectiveness in locating hiding places and bunkers where Jews sought refuge. Many officers succumbed to profound demoralization. Witnesses reported extreme brutality during "blockades" and roundups. They exploited the deportations for personal enrichment, looting abandoned apartments, extorting bribes for release from the Umschlagplatz, passing information to families, or selling bread at exorbitant prices to those awaiting transport. Some even coerced women and girls into sexual intercourse by promising release from Umschlagplatz. When the quota of five people per officer per day was imposed for delivery to Umschlagplatz, officers began "hunting people", destroying employment certificates, and "trading" captured individuals among themselves. Some reportedly delivered even acquaintances and family members to Umschlagplatz.

During Grossaktion Warsaw, the Jewish Ghetto Police leadership executed German orders without objection. "Technical commander" Jakub Lejkin was noted for his "exceptional diligence and initiative". Józef Szeryński, released from Pawiak, also actively participated in the deportations to Treblinka; one account describes him sitting on a rickshaw at Umschlagplatz, "striking his boots with a whip, looking bored as if sending Jews to their deaths was a tedious routine police duty". While some former officers later sought to justify Szeryński's and Lejkin's actions, Mieczysław Szmerling became a "symbol of the Order Service's cruelty" and an object of universal hatred. As daytime manager of Umschlagplatz, he was notorious for bribery, ruthlessness, and even sadism. Some accounts claim his zeal was so extreme that he refused to release anyone from Umschlagplatz, "even for the highest bribes or on the orders of German officials and soldiers". He also expelled officers who secretly released Jews from Umschlagplatz.

The officers' residence in the "police block" was seen as further evidence of their severance from the Jewish community. Survivors' memoirs mention officers' wives sunbathing on deckchairs outside the block during "blockades" and "selections", awaiting their husbands' return from duty.

However, Jewish Ghetto Police officers' behavior was not uniform. An unknown number abandoned their posts, unwilling to aid the Germans in their nation's destruction. According to Abraham Lewin, eight officers committed suicide in the first week of Grossaktion Warsaw. Others remained in the Jewish Ghetto Police but sabotaged German orders or selflessly aided escapes from Umschlagplatz, saving individuals like Tosia Altman. One such officer was Arie Grzybowski from Łódź, who risked his life to rescue people from Umschlagplatz.

Approximately 20–30 officers were killed by the Germans for broadly defined sabotage of deportations. The most frequently cited case is officer Kapłański, a member of the HeHalutz organization, shot by the Germans for rescuing Jews from Umschlagplatz. Others killed included officers Zakhajm, Owczyński, Szterling, and Central Detention Center head Leopold Lindenfeld.

=== Attitude of the Jewish resistance toward the Jewish Ghetto Police ===
The Jewish resistance in the Warsaw Ghetto regarded the Jewish Ghetto Police as a hostile organization from the outset. Harsh criticism of the Jewish Ghetto Police appeared in virtually all underground publications. Underground papers labeled officers as "Hitler's lackeys" and "wretched servants of the invader". The Oneg Shabbat team viewed the Jewish Ghetto Police's existence as one of the most egregious symptoms of wartime demoralization in the ghetto. Initially, the resistance did not call for active opposition to the Jewish Ghetto Police but urged its boycott and promised post-war trials for its members.

After Grossaktion Warsaw began, the Jewish resistance equated the Jewish Ghetto Police with the Germans, viewing it as an unequivocally criminal entity. On 24 July 1942, Hashomer Hatzair members distributed leaflets in the ghetto urging resistance against the Jewish Ghetto Police and sabotage of German orders. On 20 August 1942, Jewish Combat Organization fighter Izrael Kanal attempted to assassinate Józef Szeryński, though the attack failed. The next day, leaflets declared that death sentences had been issued for all Jewish Ghetto Police officers. Subsequent leaflets, posted after the deportations, announced that the Jewish Ghetto Police commander, officers, and rank-and-file members were under indictment, with further armed actions promised against the police.

From the autumn of 1942, Jewish Ghetto Police officers became regular targets of Jewish underground assassinations. On 29 October 1942, deputy commander Jakub Lejkin was killed. Attacks on Jewish Ghetto Police officers continued until the outbreak of the Warsaw Ghetto Uprising. Barbara Engelking estimates that the Jewish Combat Organization killed around a dozen officers and collaborators between Grossaktion Warsaw and the uprising.

=== Polish attitudes toward the Jewish Ghetto Police ===
During World War II, the activities of the Jewish Ghetto Police were exploited for propaganda purposes by the Polish propaganda press. Articles in Nowy Kurier Warszawski portrayed the Jewish Ghetto Police as the only force capable of controlling the chaos in the ghetto.

The Polish underground press, particularly that linked to the nationalist movement, often projected the Jewish Ghetto Police's behavior onto the entire ghetto community. Such narratives appeared, for example, in Wielka Polska. However, the Jewish Ghetto Police was typically described in the context of divisions within the Jewish community, frequently labeled as oppressors of Jews. The underground press also spread rumors that Jewish policemen were used by the Gestapo to track Jews hiding on the "Aryan side".

The Polish underground organization Polish Socialists had informants and operatives within the Jewish Ghetto Police. This was exceptional, as other leftist organizations generally excluded Jewish Ghetto Police members from their ranks and avoided such sources of information. Collaborators with the Polish Socialists included Izrael Kanal, Marian Merenholc, Jerzy Herc, Mieczysław Dąb, and Jerzy Lewiński. The Polish Socialists underground press also criticized the activities of the Judenrat and Jewish Ghetto Police and warned readers about officers suspected of being Gestapo agents.

== After the war ==
=== Fate of Jewish Ghetto Police officers ===
Due to the widespread hatred toward the Jewish Ghetto Police, there were instances where officers deported by the Germans to labor camps or assigned to work details in the Treblinka extermination camp were lynched by fellow prisoners.

One of the highest-ranking Jewish Ghetto Police officers to survive the occupation was Marian Händel. Shortly after the war, he emigrated to France and later to Venezuela, where he lived under a changed name.

Stanisław Adler, a Jewish Ghetto Police officer and memoirist, served post-war as an advisor to the Provisional Government of the Republic of Poland in Lublin and later as deputy director of the legal department in the Provisional Government of National Unity. He died by suicide following the Kielce pogrom.

=== Trials before the Social Court at the Central Committee of Polish Jews ===
In October 1946, the Central Committee of Polish Jews established the Central Social Court to address cases of Jews suspected of collaboration with the occupiers during the war. Many cases involved former Warsaw Jewish Ghetto Police officers; of the 31 cases related to the Warsaw Ghetto, 23 concerned former Jewish Ghetto Police members, though 21 did not result in convictions. The court did not judge the Jewish Ghetto Police as a whole; each officer was tried individually. On 1 December 1946, the court published a notice in the press, ordering all former Warsaw Ghetto policemen to report their residence and occupation to the Central Committee of Polish Jews by 15 January 1947. Most former officers ignored the summons.

The first case heard by the Social Court was that of Szapsel Rotholc, a boxer and Warsaw Ghetto policeman. In June 1946, Rotholc requested rehabilitation from the Central Committee of Polish Jews' inter-party honor court, which only handled cases of party members. After the Social Court's establishment, Ludwik Gutmacher prepared an indictment accusing Rotholc of collaboration and "beating and terrorizing Warsaw's Jewish population". The judicial panel included Bernard Borg, Róża Koniecpolska, Aleksander Ołomucki, Salomon (Stanisław) Temczyn, and Judowski. Articles in Wieczór Warszawy reported about 600 spectators at the hearings. Witnesses highlighted Rotholc's cruelty, accusing him of personally escorting groups of up to 50 or 60 people to the Umschlagplatz. Others testified in his favor, citing his aid to smugglers and releases from Umschlagplatz. On 29 November 1946, the Social Court found Rotholc guilty of participating in liquidation actions and beating Jews, sentencing him to two years of exclusion from the Jewish community and a three-year ban from social and sports organizations. Shortly after, Rotholc was arrested under the August Decree, but the prosecutor dropped charges, and he was released. On 22 June 1948, through efforts by Henryk Szemberg, deputy director of the Main Office of Physical Culture, and Rotholc's lawyer Bolesław Kobryner, the Social Court lifted his sentence. That year, Rotholc emigrated with his son to Montreal, where he did not resume his boxing career.

The second convicted Jewish Ghetto Police officer was Abram Wolfowicz, who used the name Zdenek Wolański post-war. During the war, he ran a sausage factory and shop and joined the Jewish Ghetto Police as a liaison to gain freedom of movement. His trial concluded on 22 May 1948 with a reprimand, as he only left the Jewish Ghetto Police after Grossaktion Warsaw. Mitigating factors included saving two young women from Umschlagplatz and participating in the Warsaw Uprising. He was punished for not voluntarily submitting to verification. Wolfowicz appealed and was acquitted. He soon emigrated to Australia.

On 6 January 1947, the Social Court requested personnel data from the Central Motorization Board for Józef Rubinrodt Marczak, a section leader in the Central Detention Center in the Warsaw Ghetto between 1941 and 1942. Former prisoners testified in his favor, noting he escaped the ghetto during Grossaktion Warsaw and provided shelter to three Jewish families – Adam Świeca, Dr. Traczyk, and Roszfeld (Marian Pieńkowski). On 14 May 1947, the prosecutor moved to dismiss the case, which the court approved on 11 July.

On 11 January 1947, lawyer Zdzisław Pechnik requested rehabilitation, admitting he served as a secretary in the Jewish Ghetto Police's V District between 1941 and 1942. The case was dismissed on 28 April 1948 for lack of evidence.

From July 1947, the Social Court handled the case of former Jewish Ghetto Police officer Henryk Nowogródzki, accused of "conduct unbecoming a Jewish citizen". Nowogródzki refused to participate until a verification process at the Bar Association concluded, delaying proceedings until February 1948. Witnesses, including Marek Edelman, testified that Nowogródzki led deportation actions and participated in the January Action in the Warsaw Ghetto. He allegedly imprisoned Edelman, Abraham Blum, and Izrael Sznajmil for delivery to Umschlagplatz, though they escaped. Nowogródzki claimed he was only a disciplinary officer in the Jewish Ghetto Police and Judenrat, wearing a police cap and armband for safety. On 23 August 1948, the prosecutor requested a suspension due to the inability to confront Nowogródzki with Edelman, who was in a sanatorium. Additional witnesses, including Mieczysław Maślanko, supported Nowogródzki's account.

From 12 August 1947, the Social Court requested the Kraków Bar Association for the personnel file of Karol Peczenik, a V District officer in the Auxiliary Service. Peczenik claimed he joined the Jewish Ghetto Police after a conversation with Adam Czerniaków and was demoted and expelled by Jakub Lejkin for questioning the Jewish Ghetto Police's role in Grossaktion Warsaw. After expulsion, he joined the Jewish Military Union and escaped during the uprising, later serving as a frontline officer in the Polish People's Army from 1944. On 6 April 1949, the prosecutor moved to dismiss the case.

From 5 July 1947 to 6 March 1948, the Social Court investigated Stanisław Gombiński, a Jewish Ghetto Police officer and head of the Command Secretariat. Witnesses testified he rescued people from Umschlagplatz and aided in distributing socialist press. One witness claimed he saved Janusz Korczak after his first arrest. Gombiński resigned from the Jewish Ghetto Police on 20 January 1943, briefly worked at a site in Praga, and escaped to the "Aryan side" in February. The investigation was dismissed for lack of guilt. In 1949, Gombiński emigrated to France.

On 2 June 1948, Jerzy Lewiński, a Jewish Ghetto Police officer between 1940 and 1942, requested rehabilitation. Marek Edelman testified to his participation in Grossaktion Warsaw. Lawyer Rozalia Landsberger-Englowa, from Stockholm, stated Lewiński worked administratively in the III District, issuing blank certificates for unfulfilled deportation quotas. Witnesses Krystyna Żywulska, Stanisława Michałowska, Major Piotr Zatorski, Szymon Rogoziński, and Stefan Kurowski testified in his favor. Post-war, Lewiński investigated Hans Biebow and Walter Pelzhausen. On 14 December 1949, the prosecutor moved to dismiss the case.

Wiera Gran was accused of close ties with Jewish Ghetto Police officers, and an investigation before the Social Court ended with her acquittal on 15 January 1949.

=== Post-war assessments ===
Memoirs and accounts of Jewish policemen were recorded during and shortly after World War II, but most former officers later remained silent. Their testimonies are preserved in archives such as Yad Vashem and the Lohamei HaGeta'ot kibbutz. In the 1990s, interviews with former Warsaw Ghetto policemen were conducted for the USC Shoah Foundation, though they avoided discussing Jewish Ghetto Police activities.

In survivor accounts and historical works, the Jewish Ghetto Police was long portrayed as a German-imposed institution entirely detached from the ghetto community. A stereotype emerged of the Jewish Ghetto Police as dominated by converted Jews. More balanced studies, addressing various aspects of the Jewish police's activities, began appearing only in the 1990s.

In Poland, since the events of March 1968, the Jewish Ghetto Police's history has often been exploited in antisemitic discourse.

== In culture ==
Jewish Ghetto Police officers appear in several poems by Władysław Szlengel, notably Pożegnanie z czapką (Farewell to the Cap) and Zahlen bitte.

The Jewish Ghetto Police and its role in the Warsaw Ghetto's destruction are mentioned in Jehoszua Perle's essay Churbn Warsze (The Destruction of Warsaw) and Itzhak Katzenelson's Pieśnń o zamordowanym żydowskim narodzie (The Song of the Murdered Jewish People).

The Jewish Ghetto Police and the varied attitudes of its officers are depicted in the war drama Uprising (2001, dir. Jon Avnet). Jewish policemen are also portrayed in the films Korczak (1990, dir. Andrzej Wajda) and The Pianist (2002, dir. Roman Polański).

== Bibliography ==
- Bethke, Svenja (2021). Dance on the Razors Edge: Crime and Punishment in the Nazi Ghettos. Toronto; Buffalo; London: University of Toronto Press. ISBN 978-1-4875-3116-4.
- Engelking, Barbara; Leociak, Jacek (2013). Getto warszawskie. Przewodnik po nieistniejącym mieście [Warsaw Ghetto: Guide to a Nonexistent City] (in Polish). Warsaw: Stowarzyszenie Centrum Badań nad Zagładą Żydów. ISBN 978-83-63444-28-0.
- Fuks, Marian, ed. (1983). Adama Czerniakowa dziennik getta warszawskiego 6 IX 1939 – 23 VII 1942 [Adam Czerniaków's Warsaw Ghetto Diary, 6 September 1939 – 23 July 1942] (in Polish). Warsaw: Państwowe Wydawnictwo Naukowe. ISBN 83-01-03042-9.
- Gutman, Israel (1993). Żydzi warszawscy 1939–1943. Getto, podziemie, walka [Warsaw Jews 1939–1943. Ghetto, Underground, Struggle] (in Polish). Warsaw: Rytm. ISBN 83-85249-26-5.
- Kassow, Samuel D. (2010). Kto napisze naszą historię? Ukryte archiwum Emanuela Ringelbluma [Who Will Write Our History? The Hidden Archive of Emanuel Ringelblum] (in Polish). Warsaw: Amber. ISBN 978-83-241-3633-9.
- Lewin, Abraham (2016). Dziennik [Journal] (in Polish). Warsaw: Żydowski Instytut Historyczny. ISBN 978-83-65254-20-7.
- Person, Katarzyna (2014). Assimilated Jews in the Warsaw Ghetto, 1940–1943. Syracuse, New York: Syracuse University Press. ISBN 978-0-8156-3334-1.
- Person, Katarzyna (2018). Policjanci. Wizerunek Żydowskiej Służby Porządkowej w getcie warszawskim [Policemen: The Image of the Jewish Ghetto Police in the Warsaw Ghetto] (in Polish). Warsaw: Żydowski Instytut Historyczny. ISBN 978-83-65254-78-8.
- Ringelblum, Emanuel (1983). Kronika getta warszawskiego [Chronicle of the Warsaw Ghetto] (in Polish). Warsaw: Czytelnik. ISBN 83-07-00879-4.
- Szymczak, J. (2022). Ja łebków nie dawałem: procesy przed Żydowskim Sądem Społecznym [I Didn't Give Any Heads: Trials before the Jewish Social Court] (in Polish). Wołowiec: Wydawnictwo Czarne. ISBN 978-83-8191-524-3.
- Urynowicz, Marcin (2009). Adam Czerniaków 1880–1942. Prezes getta warszawskiego [Adam Czerniaków 1880–1942: Chairman of the Warsaw Ghetto] (in Polish). Warsaw: Instytut Pamięci Narodowej. ISBN 978-83-7629-050-8.
- Żbikowski, Andrzej (2014). Sąd Społeczny przy CKŻP. Wojenne rozliczenia społeczności żydowskiej w Polsce [The Social Court at the CKŻP: Wartime Reckonings of the Jewish Community in Poland] (in Polish). Warsaw: Żydowski Instytut Historyczny. ISBN 978-83-61850-23-6.
