= Auerswald =

Auerswald is a German surname. Notable people with the surname include:

- Hans Adolf Erdmann von Auerswald (1792–1848), Prussian general and politician
- Rudolf von Auerswald (1795–1866), German (Prussian) official
- Heinz Auerswald (1908–1970), German lawyer and member of the SS in Nazi Germany
- Ingrid Auerswald (born 1957), German athlete
