= Józef Szeryński =

Jewish Nazi collaborator (1892–1943)

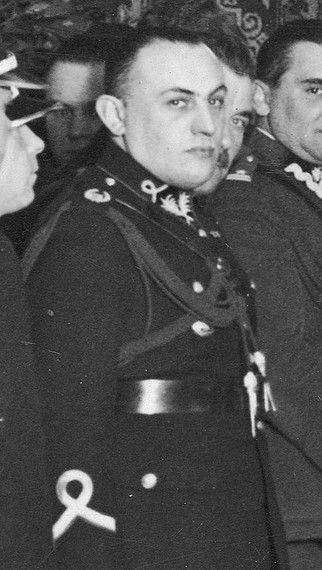
Józef Szeryński in 1931

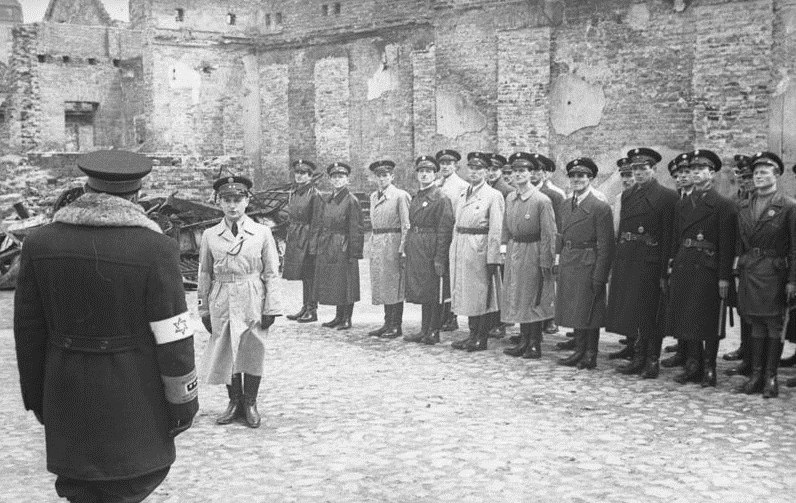
Szeryński (left, standing with his back to the camera) receives a report from Jakub Lejkin, May 1941

Józef Andrzej Szeryński (born Josef Szynkman, 8 November 1893 or 1892 – 24 January 1943) was a police-colonel in interwar Poland, inspector for the Lublin district and later – in German-occupied Poland during the Second World War – the commander of the Jewish Ghetto Police in the Warsaw Ghetto. Szeryński was viewed as a collaborator and traitor by the Jewish underground in the Warsaw Ghetto. The chairman of the Warsaw Ghetto's Jewish Council Adam Czerniaków selected Szeryński to create the Jewish Ghetto Police in 1940. Szeryński was arrested by the German Gestapo on May 1, 1942, for smuggling furs out of the Warsaw Ghetto for personal gain. He was released on the condition of leading the deportation action to Treblinka extermination camp in July 1942. The very next month Jewish underground attempted to assassinate him, unsuccessfully. He remained at the helm of the Ghetto Police until the end of the Grossaktion Warsaw which claimed the lives of over 254,000 ghetto inmates, men, women and children. He committed suicide right after the next wave of deportations in January 1943.

== Life ==
Józef Szynkman (often misspelled as Szenkman) was born to a Jewish family. He changed his name from Szynkman to Szeryński in the 1920s, joined the police reaching the rank of colonel, and soon developed an anti-Semitic self-hating attitude, labeling Jews as “animals” and "cows". He also converted to Christianity and had been an active member of the reactionary, antisemitic political group Narodowcy before the war.

Following the German invasion of Poland he was briefly arrested by the Germans. After his release, Szynkman moved from Lublin to Warsaw with his family and settled in the Warsaw Ghetto. On 9 November 1940, Szeryński was entrusted by Adam Czerniaków with organizing the Jewish Ghetto Police force collaborating with the Germans. The Jewish Police under Szeryński's command was responsible for beatings and persecution of ghetto inhabitants, participated in searches and arrests and gathering of deportees in the Umschlagplatz before they were sent to extermination camps. Under Szeryński's orders the Jewish Police made sure that children and the sick were first to be deported as they were the weakest.

As the Jewish Police commander, Szeryński was a privileged inhabitant of the ghetto and was even exempt from the requirement of wearing an armband with the Star of David. He was widely regarded as corrupt and engaging in black market activities. He was known for an explosive temper and aggression toward the Jewish ghetto policemen under his command. On 1 May 1942, the Germans arrested Szeryński accusing him of theft of fur coats confiscated from the ghetto population. His deputy Jakub Lejkin temporarily took his place as the Jewish Police commander. However, Szeryński was released on 26 July 1942 as the Germans realized that they needed his services to organize the massive deportations of ghetto Jews to Treblinka extermination camp which were carried out between 23 July and 21 September 1942.

== Death ==
On 21 August 1942, Szeryński was shot in an assassination attempt carried out by Izrael Kanal, a member of the Jewish police working on behalf of the underground Jewish Combat Organization. Szeryński was severely wounded with two bullets but survived.

On 18 January 1943, the German forces entered the ghetto to carry out the second massive deportation operation and eventually sent all the remaining ghetto inhabitants to the extermination camps. A few days after the deportations resumed, Szeryński committed suicide by ingesting cyanide.
