= Jakub Lejkin =

Warsaw Ghetto administrator in 1942

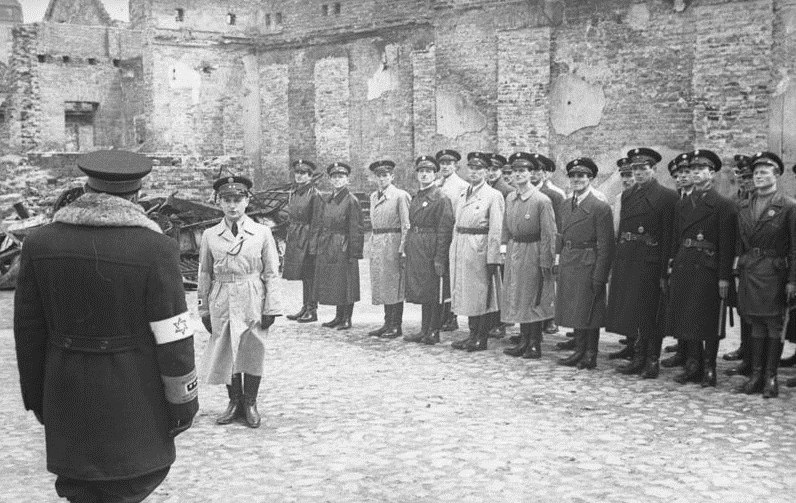
Jakub Lejkin reporting to the commandant Szeryński, May 1941

Jakub Lejkin (1906 – 29 October 1942) was a Polish lawyer, deputy commander of the Jewish Ghetto Police subordinate to the Germans at the Warsaw Ghetto. He was the administrator from May to July 1942 (after the temporary arrest by the Gestapo of Józef Szeryński). Lejkin played a leading role in the deportation of local Jews to extermination camps. The Germans nicknamed him “little Napoleon” and adored his brutality.

His father was a wealthy tradesman. Lejkin graduated from the Polish military school in Jarocin. Before the war, he worked as a lawyer in Warsaw.

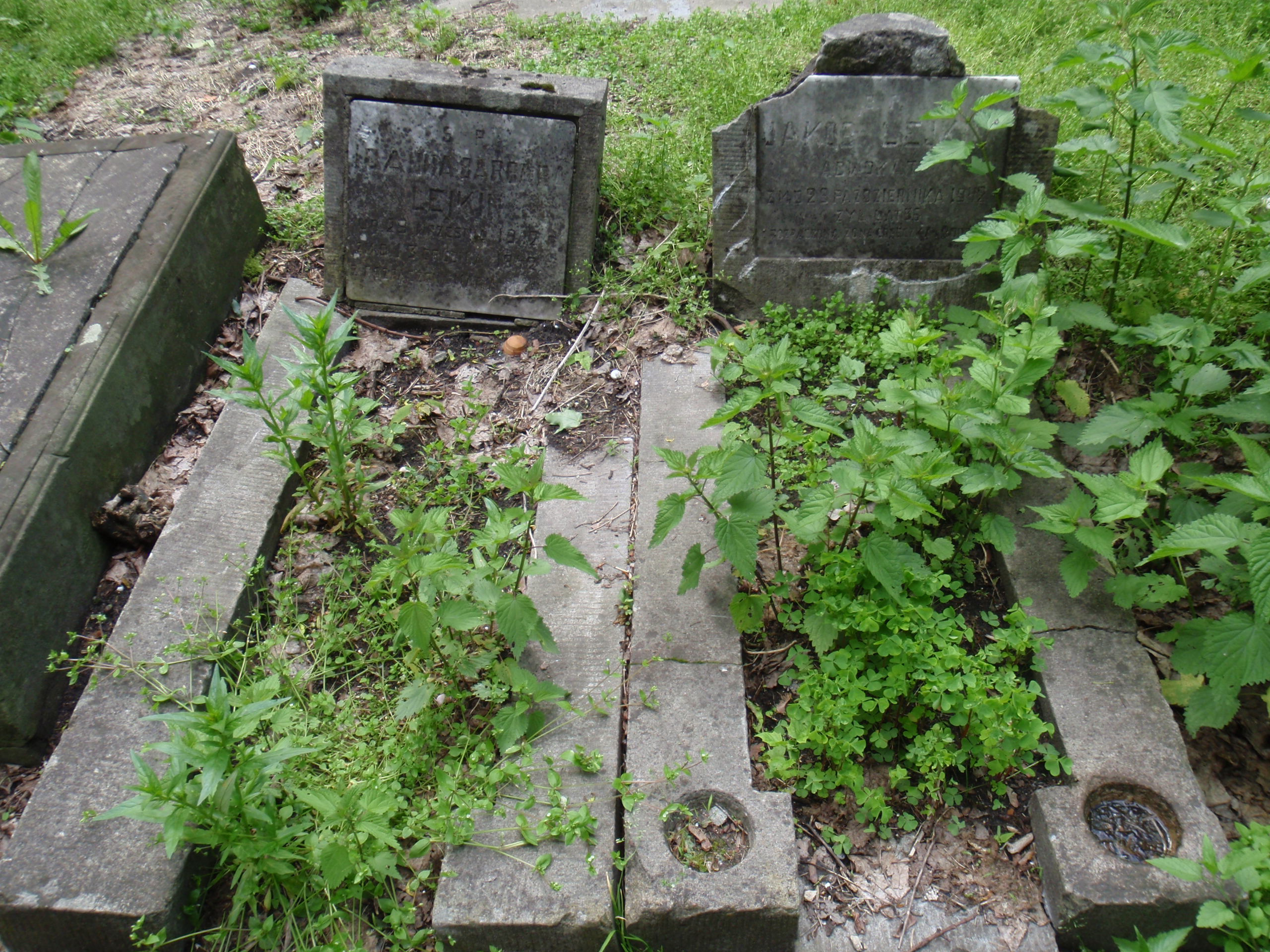
The grave of Lejkin

On 29 October 1942, at 18:10, he died as a result of the execution carried out by the Jewish Combat Organization. Lejkin was shot in broad daylight on Gęsia Street in Warsaw by the Jewish resistance fighter Eliasz Różański. His route was tracked down earlier by other resistance soldiers, Emilia Landau and Israel Gutman. Lejkin was buried in the Warsaw Jewish cemetery.
