= Izrael Kanal =

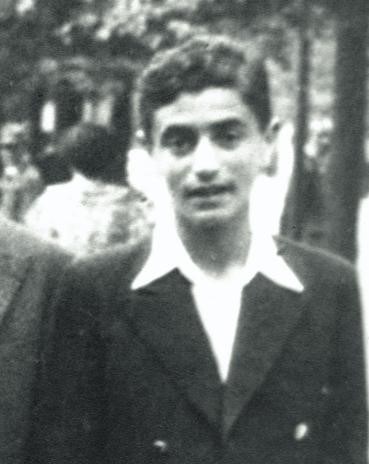
Izrael Kanał

Izrael Kanał, also known as Mietek and Jehuda, was a Jewish resistance soldier in the Warsaw Ghetto and a participant of the Warsaw Ghetto Uprising in 1943.

== Biography ==
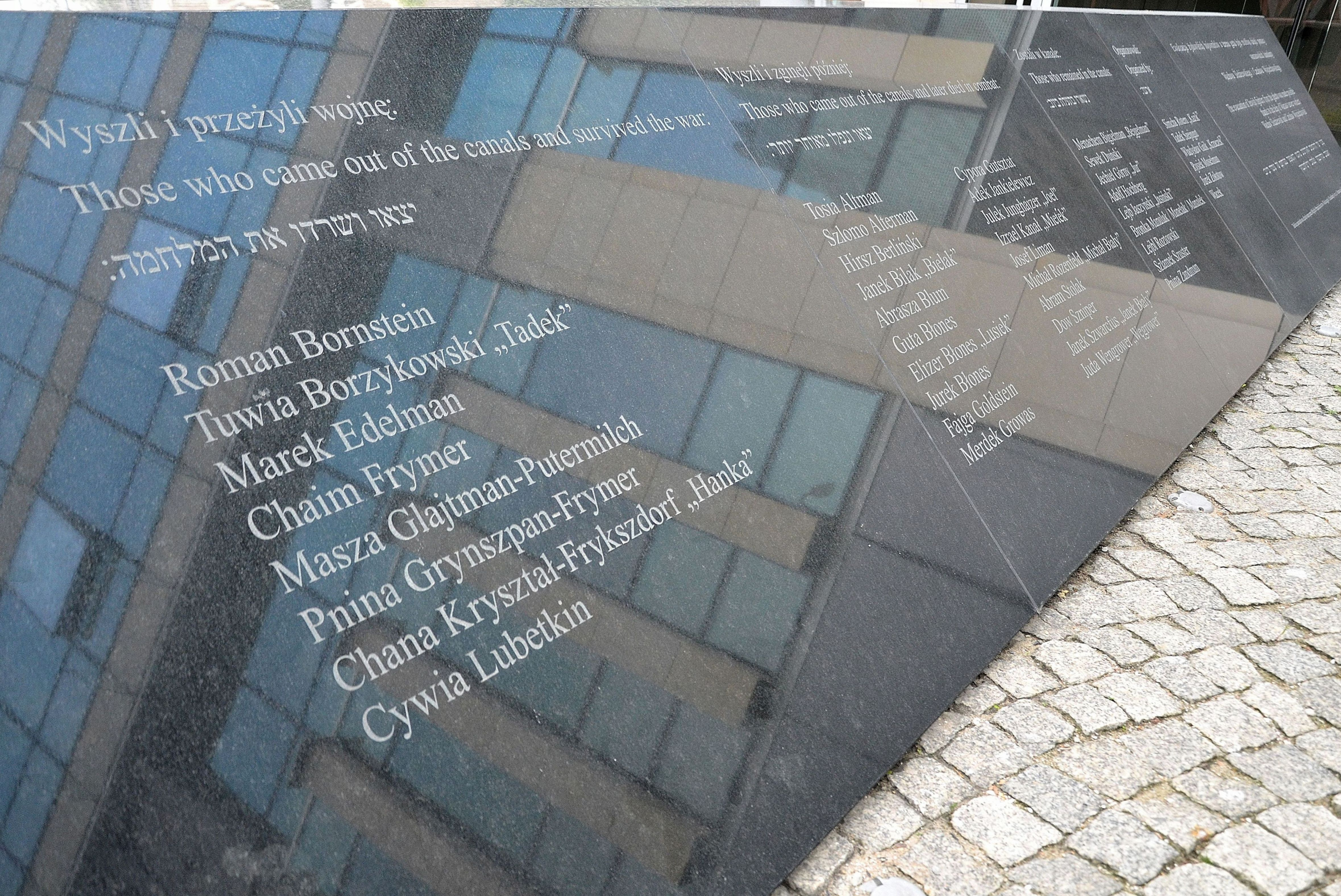
Monument to the Evacuation of the Warsaw Ghetto Fighters, Izrael Kanal's name in the third column.

Izrael Kanał was born in Bydgoszcz, Poland. He was a member of the Zionist organization Akiba. Kanał served in the Jewish Ghetto Police under the command of Józef Szeryński. On August 21, 1942, he carried out a failed assassination attempt on Szeryński in his apartment at Nowolipki Street in Warsaw. Szeryński was severely wounded with two bullets but survived. The attack was a consequence of the death sentence declared on Szeryński by the Jewish Combat Organization for collaboration with the Germans. During the ghetto uprising in April 1943, Kanał was the commander of JCO fighters in the Central Ghetto. On May 10, 1943, along with a group of Jewish fighters, he was evacuated outside the ghetto walls by the Polish resistance. He was later arrested by the Germans and presumably murdered in Auschwitz-Birkenau in 1943.

== Recognition ==
The name of Izrael Kanał is shown on the commemorative plaque placed at Monument to the Evacuation of the Warsaw Ghetto Fighters at 51 Prosta Street in Warsaw.

The character of Calel Wasser in the 2001 film Uprising is loosely based on Kanal.

== See also ==
- Michał Klepfisz
- Yitzhak Zuckerman
- List of Polish Holocaust resisters
