= Heinz Auerswald =

German member of the SS (1908–1970)

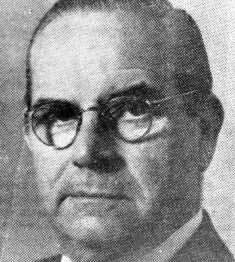
- Born: 26 July 1908; Berlin, Province of Brandenburg, German Empire
- Died: 5 December 1970 (aged 62); Düsseldorf, North Rhine-Westphalia, West Germany
- Political party: National Socialist German Workers' Party

Heinz Auerswald (26 July 1908 – 5 December 1970) was a German lawyer and member of the Schutzstaffel (SS) in Nazi Germany, which he joined in 1933. In 1937 he became a member of the NSDAP. During World War II he served as the Commissioner of the Warsaw Ghetto.

== Early years ==
Heinz Auerswald was born on 26 July 1908 in Berlin. He spent his youth with his mother and relatives in the countryside. He attended elementary school and upper secondary school in Berlin, before graduating in 1927. He then worked for three years at Knorr-Bremse in Berlin before starting law school, graduating with a doctorate.

== Career in the NSDAP ==
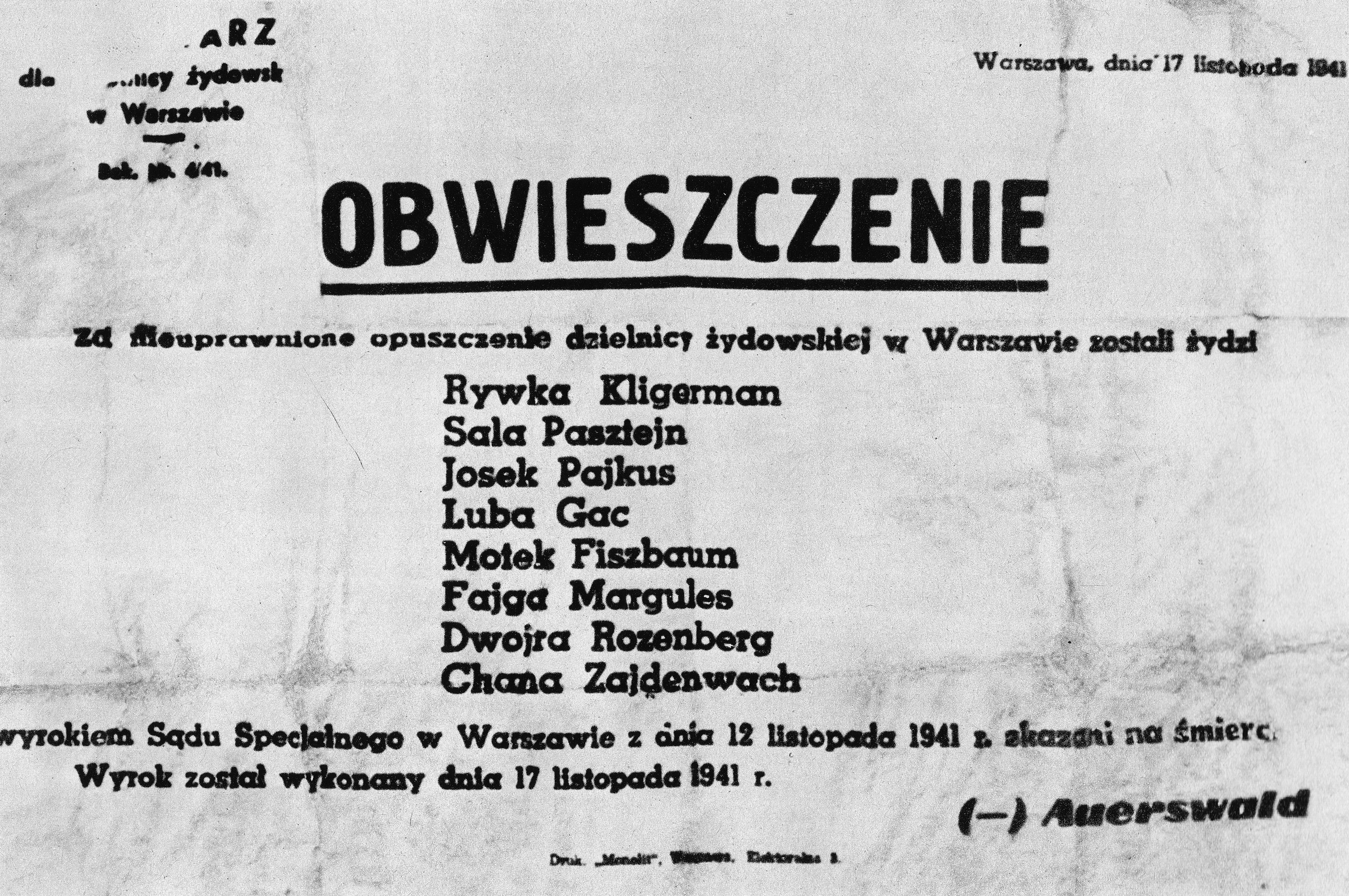
17 November 1941, Public announcement of the execution of eight Jewish dwellers of the Warsaw ghetto for having trespassed its boundaries, signed by Heinz Auerswald

On 7 June 1933 he became a member of the SS. He was the German Commissioner of the Warsaw Ghetto ("Kommissar für den jüdischen Wohnbezirk"), from April 1941 to November 1942. While the Nazis depicted themselves as administrators and managers pursuing a would-be "productionalist policy of economic independence providing the Ghetto with essential materials for its inhabitants continual survival until the adoption of the final solution", in reality they were already pursuing the Nazi goal of exterminating European Jewry through starvation, exposure and diseases induced by abysmal living conditions.

"Overcrowding and food shortages led to an extremely high mortality rate in the ghetto. Almost 30 percent of the population of Warsaw was packed into 2.4 percent of the city's area. The Germans set a food ration for Jews at just 181 calories a day. By August 1941, more than 5,000 people a month succumbed to starvation and disease." At least one order given by Auerswald for the execution of Jews who had escaped the Ghetto from 17 October 1941, is extant. The mass deportations of Jews from the Ghetto to the Treblinka extermination camp on 22 July 1942 began while Auerswald was the Ghetto Commissioner.

== Later life ==
After the war, Auerswald was active as a lawyer in Düsseldorf. A late preliminary investigation into his participation in Nazi war crimes was initiated by the public prosecution in Dortmund, which was discontinued due to Auerswald's death in 1970.

== See also ==
- List of Nazi Party leaders and officials
