= Warsaw Ghetto Uprising =

Jewish insurgency against Nazi Germany in German-occupied Poland during World War II

- Part of ghetto uprisings during World War II
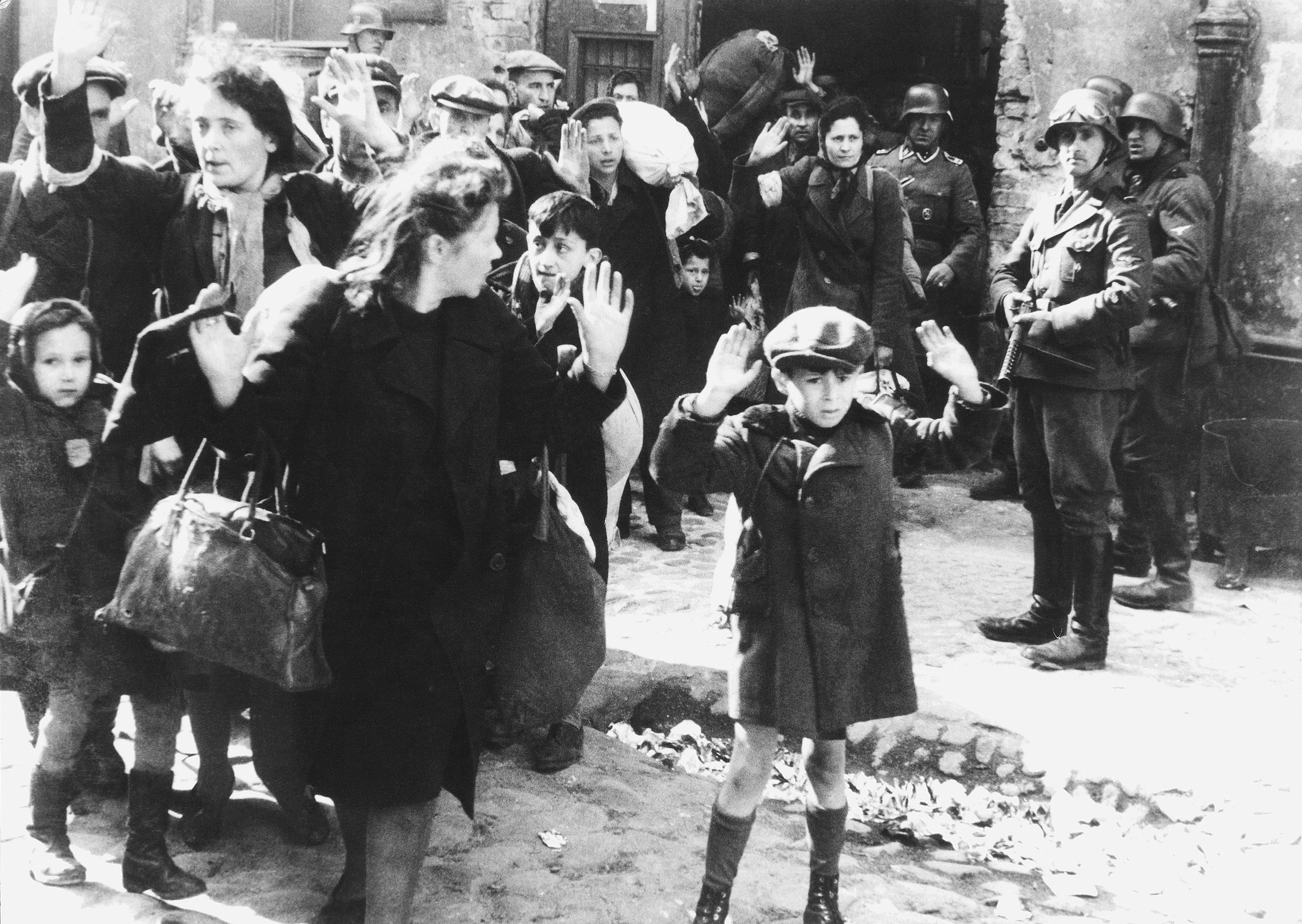
- Jewish women and children forcibly removed from a bunker by Schutzstaffel (SS) units for deportation either to Majdanek or Treblinka extermination camps (1943); one of the most iconic pictures of the Holocaust.
Date	19 April – 16 May 1943 (29 days)
Location	Warsaw Ghetto, General Government (present-day Poland) 52°14′46″N 20°59′45″E
Result	German victory. Uprising suppressed and ghetto destroyed.

Belligerents
Germany; Gestapo, Orpo, SD, Waffen-SS, Wehrmacht	Jewish resistance; Jewish Combat Organization; Jewish Military Union; Supported by: AK (Home Army); GL (People's Guard)

Commanders and leaders
(Nazi Germany) Ferdinand von Sammern-Frankenegg (Note: Relieved from command); (Nazi Germany) Jürgen Stroop; (Nazi Germany) Arpad Wigand; (Nazi Germany) Ludwig Hahn	Mordechai Anielewicz †; Yitzhak Zuckerman; Zivia Lubetkin; Maurycy Orzech (executed); Marek Edelman; Paweł Frenkiel †; Leon Rodal †; Dawid Wdowiński

Strength
Daily average of 2,090 including: 830 Waffen-SS; 337 Trawniki men 234 order police 59 Wehrmacht	About 600 ŻOB and about 400 ŻZW fighters, plus a number of Polish fighters

Casualties and losses
January uprising: About a dozen killed Several dozen wounded April uprising: German figures: 16 killed 93 wounded Jewish resistance estimate: 300 casualties	56,065 killed or captured of which approximately 36,000 deported to extermination camps (German estimate)

The Warsaw Ghetto Uprising (Note: Yiddish: אױפֿשטאַנד אין װאַרשעװער געטאָ, romanized: Ufshtand in Varshever Geto Polish: powstanie w getcie warszawskim German: Aufstand im Warschauer Ghetto) was an uprising by the Jewish resistance in the Warsaw Ghetto in German-occupied Poland during World War II to oppose Nazi Germany's final effort to transport the remaining ghetto population to the gas chambers of the Majdanek and Treblinka extermination camps in 1943. It was the largest single revolt by Jews against the Nazis during World War II.

After the Grossaktion Warsaw of summer 1942, in which more than a quarter of a million Jews were deported from the ghetto to Treblinka and murdered, the remaining Jews began to build bunkers and smuggle weapons and explosives into the ghetto. The left-wing Jewish Combat Organization (ŻOB) and right-wing Jewish Military Union (ŻZW) formed and began to train. A small resistance effort to another roundup in January 1943 was partially successful and spurred Polish resistance groups to support the Jews in earnest.

The uprising started on 19 April when the ghetto refused to surrender to the police commander SS-Brigadeführer Jürgen Stroop, who ordered the destruction of the ghetto, block by block, ending on 16 May. According to Stroop at least 56,065 Jews were killed or captured. Stroop reported 110 German casualties, including 16 killed.

The uprising was the largest single revolt by Jews during World War II. The Jews knew that victory was impossible and survival unlikely. Marek Edelman, the last surviving ŻOB commander, who died in 2009, said their inspiration to fight was "not to allow the Germans alone to pick the time and place of our deaths". According to the United States Holocaust Memorial Museum, the uprising was "one of the most significant occurrences in the history of the Jewish people".

== Background ==
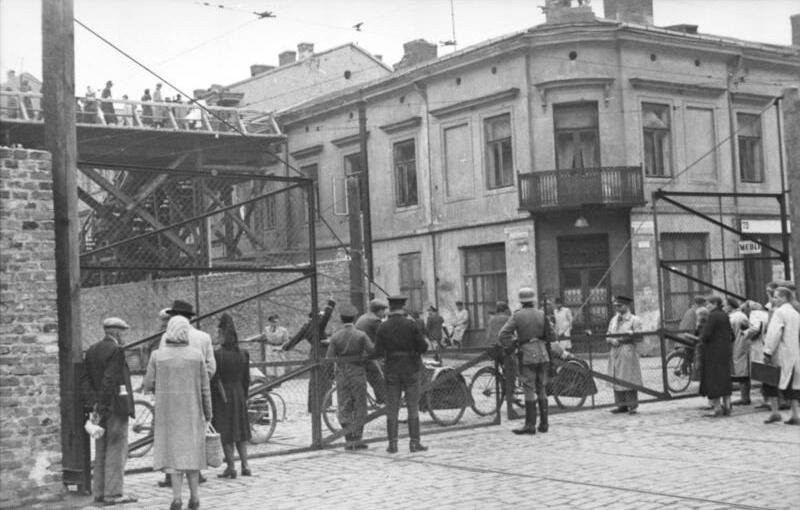
Corner of Żelazna 70 and Chłodna 23 (looking east). This section of Żelazna street connected the "large ghetto" and "small ghetto" areas of German-occupied Warsaw.

Map of Jewish holdouts in the Warsaw Ghetto during the uprising with dates of liquidation

In 1939, German authorities began to concentrate Poland's population of over three million Jews into a number of extremely crowded ghettos located in large Polish cities. The largest of these, the Warsaw Ghetto, collected approximately 300,000–400,000 people into a densely packed, 3.3 km^{2} area of Warsaw. Thousands of Jews were killed by rampant disease and starvation under SS and Police Leader Odilo Globocnik and SS-Standartenführer Ludwig Hahn, even before the mass deportations from the ghetto to the Treblinka extermination camp began.

The SS conducted many of the deportations during the operation code-named Grossaktion Warschau, between 23 July and 21 September 1942. Just before the operation began, the German "Resettlement Commissioner" SS-Sturmbannführer Hermann Höfle called a meeting of the Ghetto Jewish Council Judenrat and informed its leader, Adam Czerniaków, that he would require 7,000 Jews a day for "resettlement to the East". Czerniaków committed suicide once he became aware of the true goal of the "resettlement" plan. Approximately 254,000–300,000 ghetto residents were murdered at Treblinka during the two-month-long operation. The Grossaktion was directed by SS-Oberführer Ferdinand von Sammern-Frankenegg, the SS and Police Leader of the Warsaw area since 1941. He would be relieved of duty as SS and Police Leader after failing to pacify the ghetto resistance and be subsequently replaced by Jürgen Stroop, who had been sent to Warsaw by Heinrich Himmler on 17 April 1943.

When the deportations first began, members of the Jewish resistance movement met and decided not to fight the SS directives, believing that the Jews were being sent to labour camps and not to be murdered. But by the end of 1942, ghetto inhabitants learned that the deportations were part of an extermination process. Many of the remaining Jews decided to revolt. The first armed resistance in the ghetto occurred in January 1943.

== Uprising ==
=== January revolt ===
On 18 January 1943, the Germans began their second deportation of the Jews, which led to the first instance of armed insurgency within the ghetto. While Jewish families hid in their so-called "bunkers", fighters of the ŻOB and ŻZW, resisted, engaging the Germans in direct clashes. Though the ŻZW and ŻOB suffered heavy losses (including some of their leaders), the Germans also took casualties, and the deportation was halted within a few days. About 1,200 Jews were killed, and about 5,000 deported, instead of the 8,000 planned by Germans. The fighters managed to kill about a dozen Germans and wound several dozen.

Hundreds of people in the Warsaw Ghetto were ready to fight, sparsely armed with handguns, gasoline bottles, and a few other weapons that had been smuggled into the ghetto by resistance fighters. Most of the Jewish fighters did not view their actions as an effective measure by which to save themselves, but rather as a battle for the honour of the Jewish people, and a protest against the world's silence.

=== Preparations ===
The ŻZW and ŻOB built dozens of fighting posts and executed a number of Nazi collaborators, including Jewish Ghetto Police officers, members of the fake (German-sponsored and controlled) resistance organization Żagiew, as well as Gestapo and Abwehr agents (including the alleged agent and Judenrat associate Alfred Nossig, executed on 22 February 1943). The ŻOB established a prison to hold and execute traitors and collaborators. Józef Szeryński, former head of the Jewish Ghetto Police, committed suicide.

Prior to the uprising starting, reconnoiter missions were held to scope about potential escape routes; Regina Fudem, a ŻOB member, established routes utilising the sewer system.

=== Main revolt ===
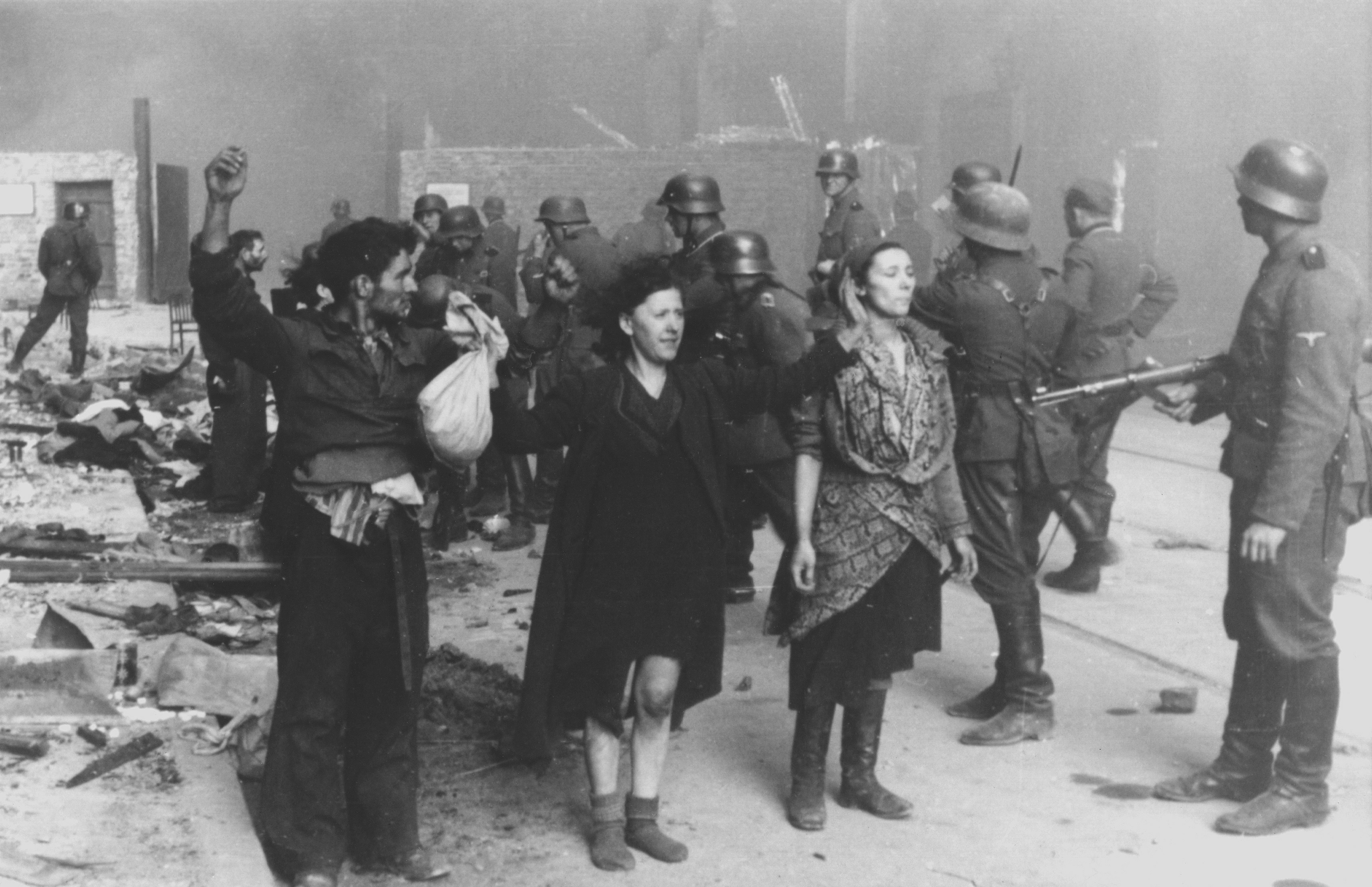
Resistance members captured at Nowolipie 64 near intersection with Smocza. Hasia Szylgold-Szpiro is on the right.

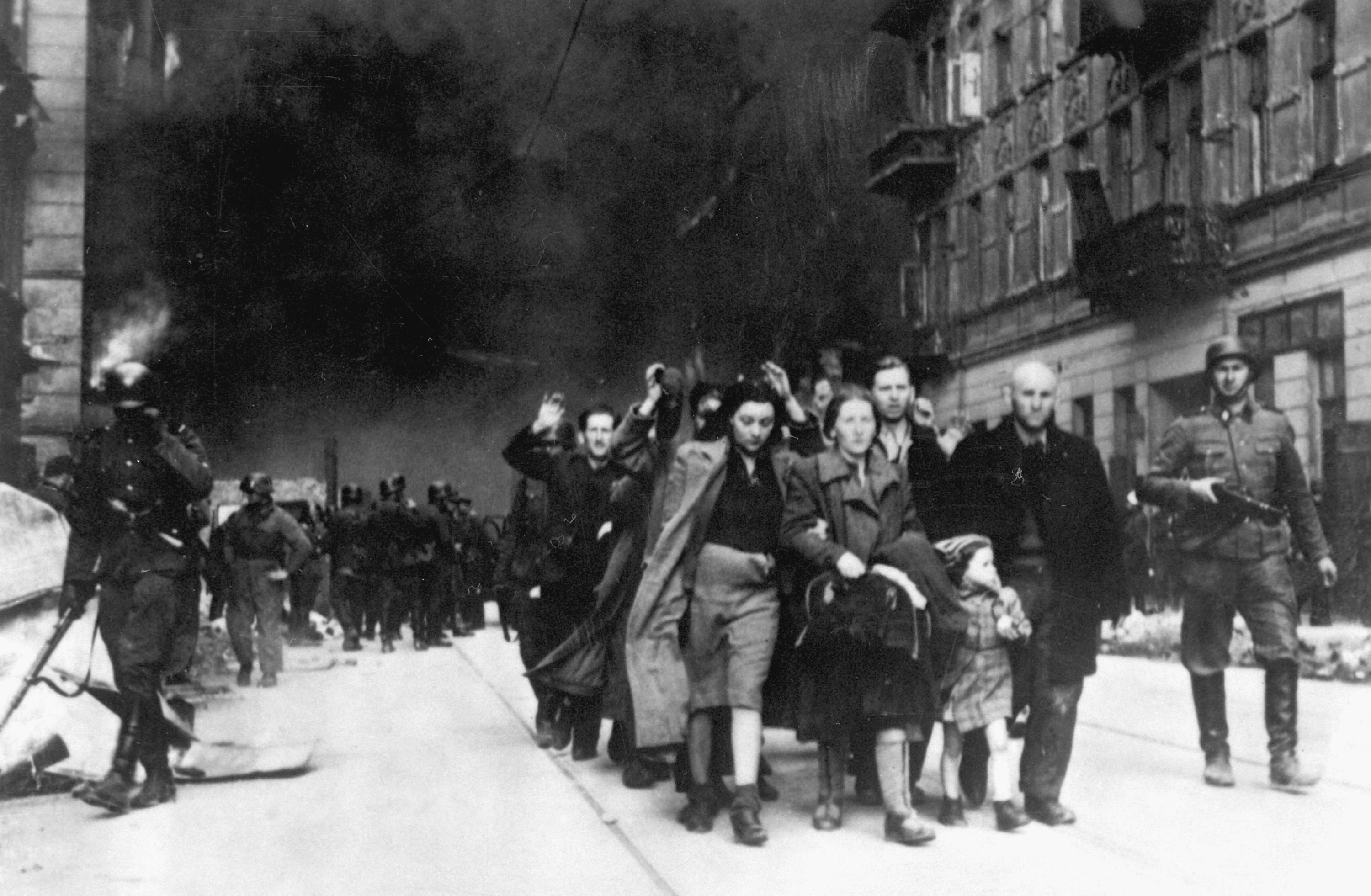
Captured Jews are led by German troops to the assembly point for deportation. Picture taken at Nowolipie Street, near the intersection with Smocza.

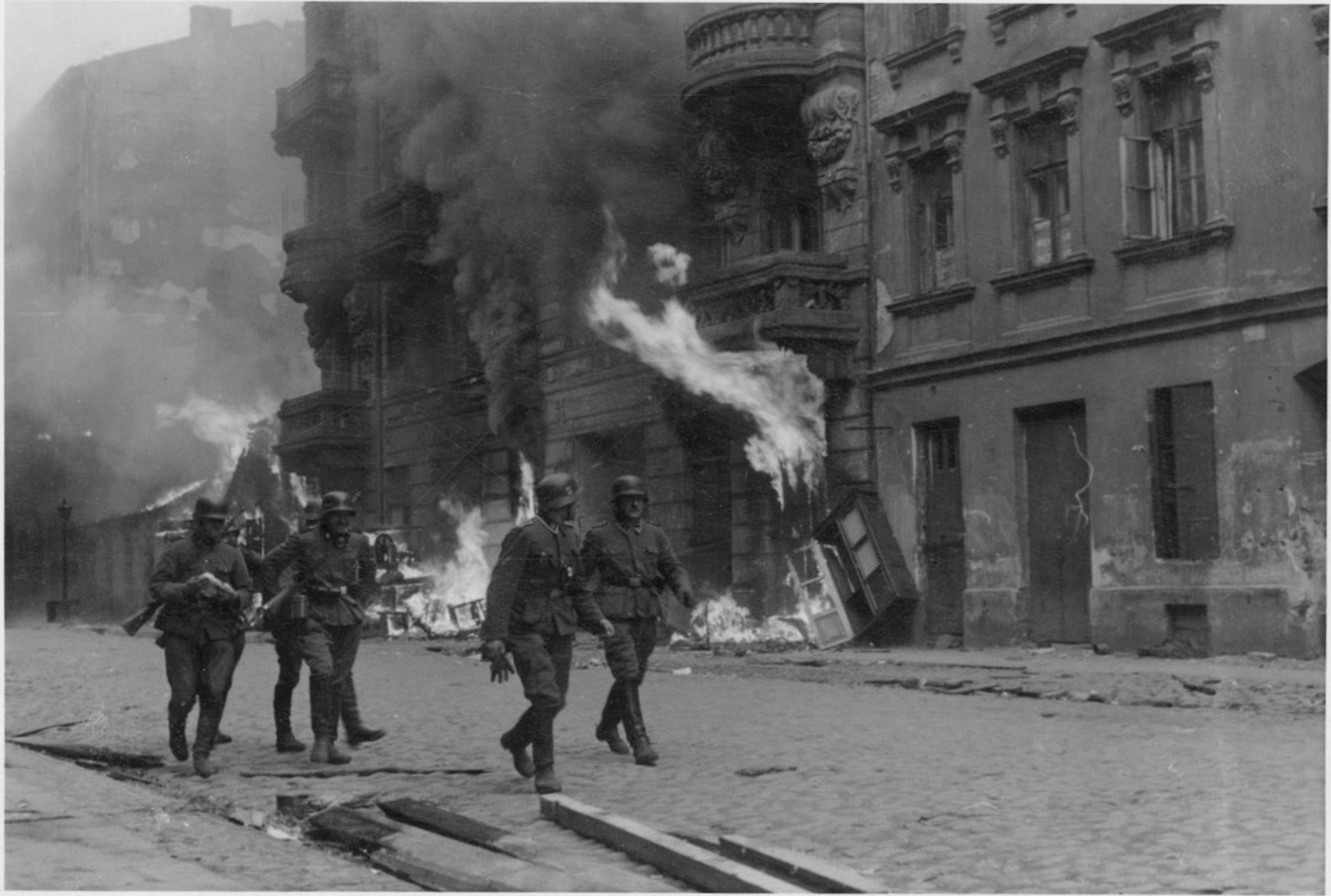
SS men on Nowolipie Street

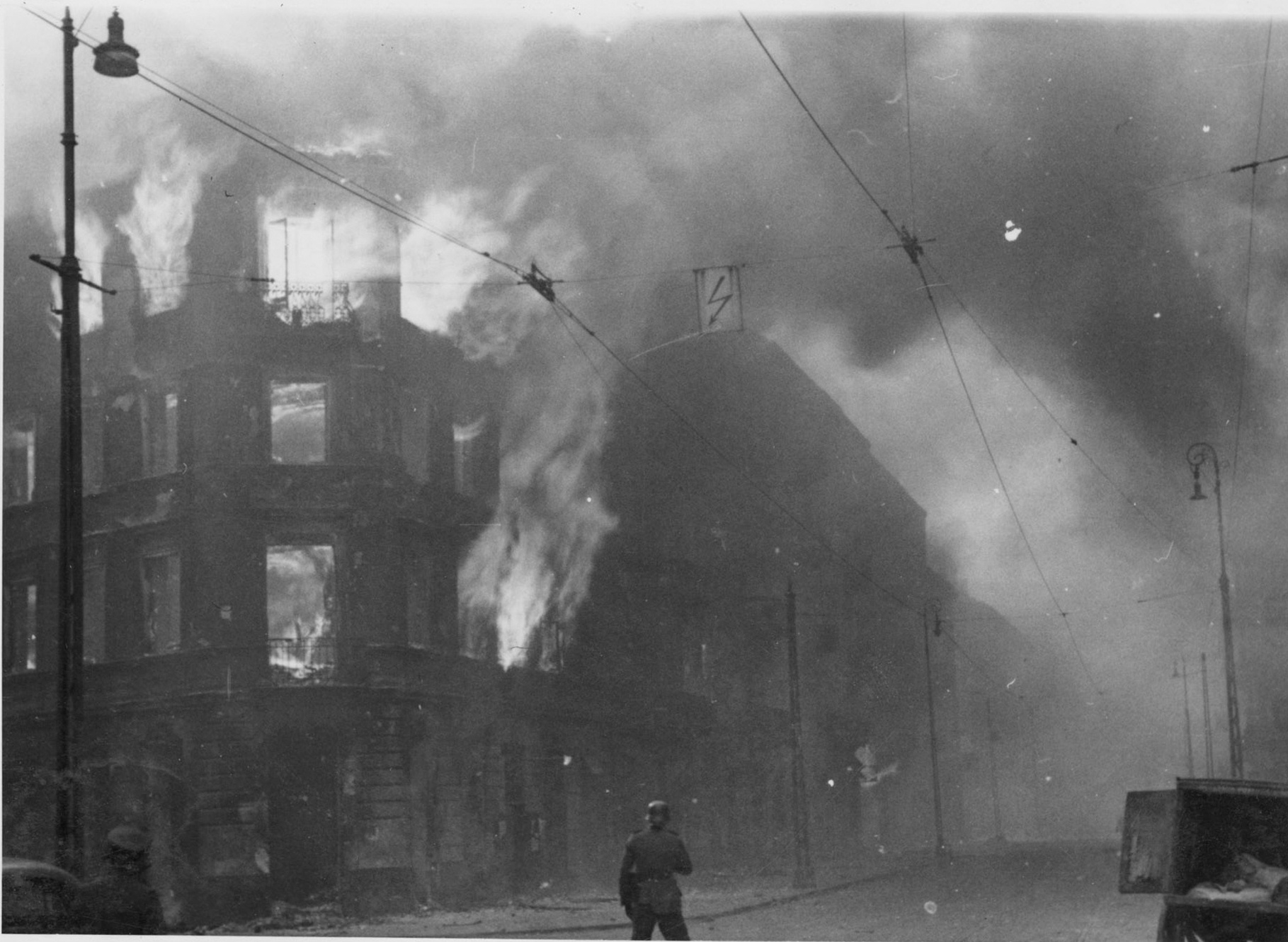
Burning buildings photographed from the intersection of Zamenhof and Wołyńska

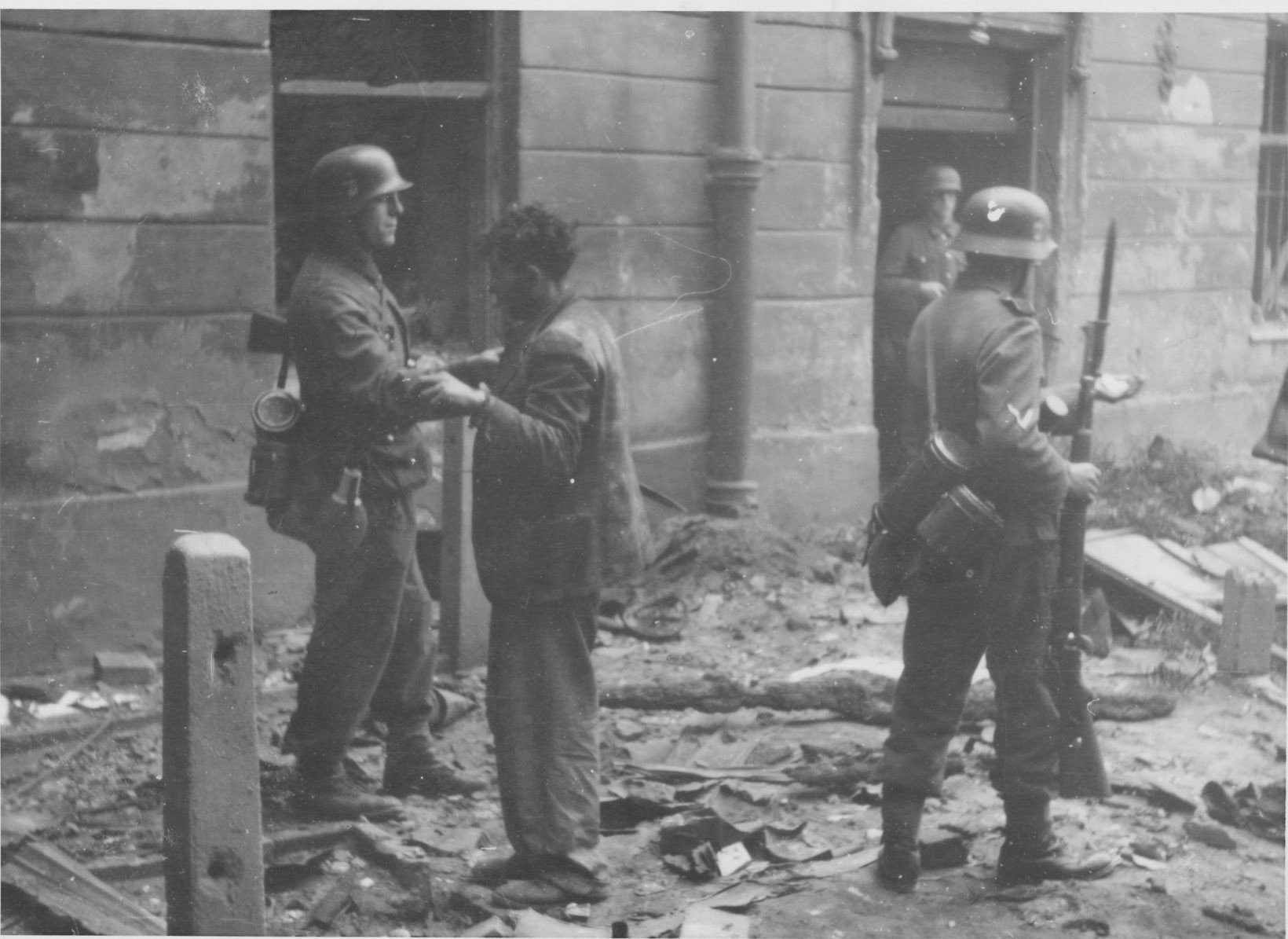
A captured resistance fighter being searched

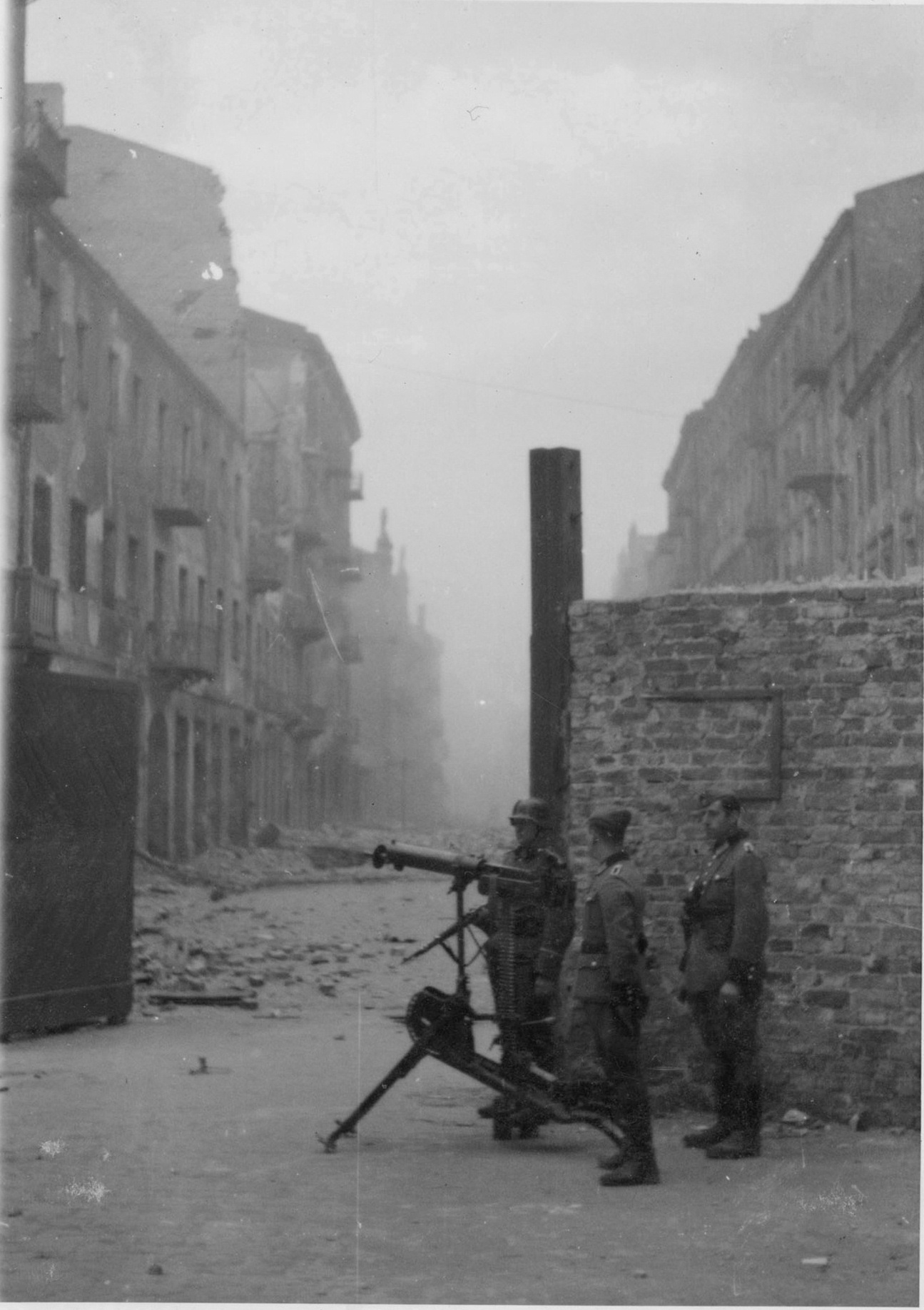
German sentries with an MG 08 machine gun guarding an entrance to the ghetto during the uprising

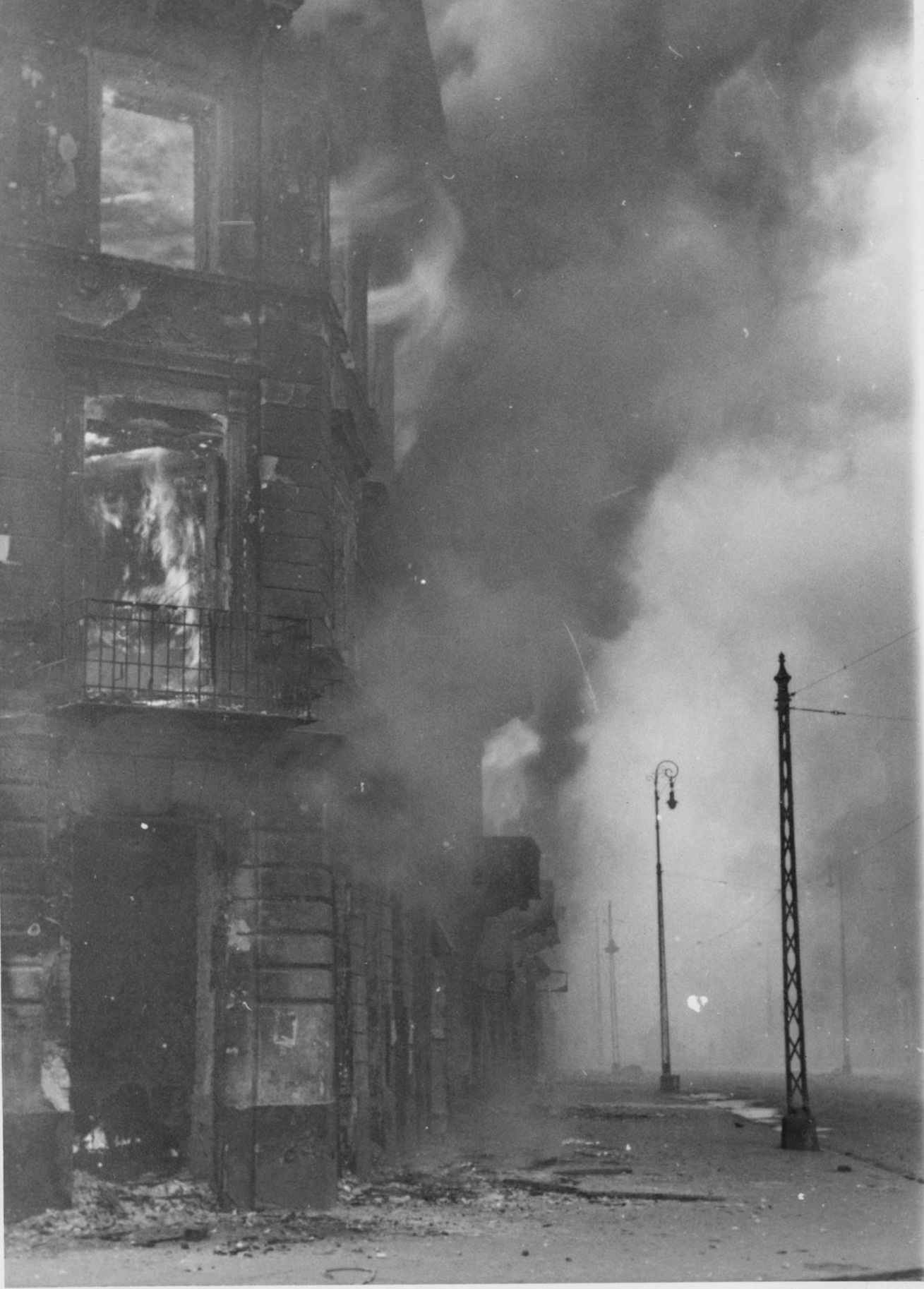
A housing block burning

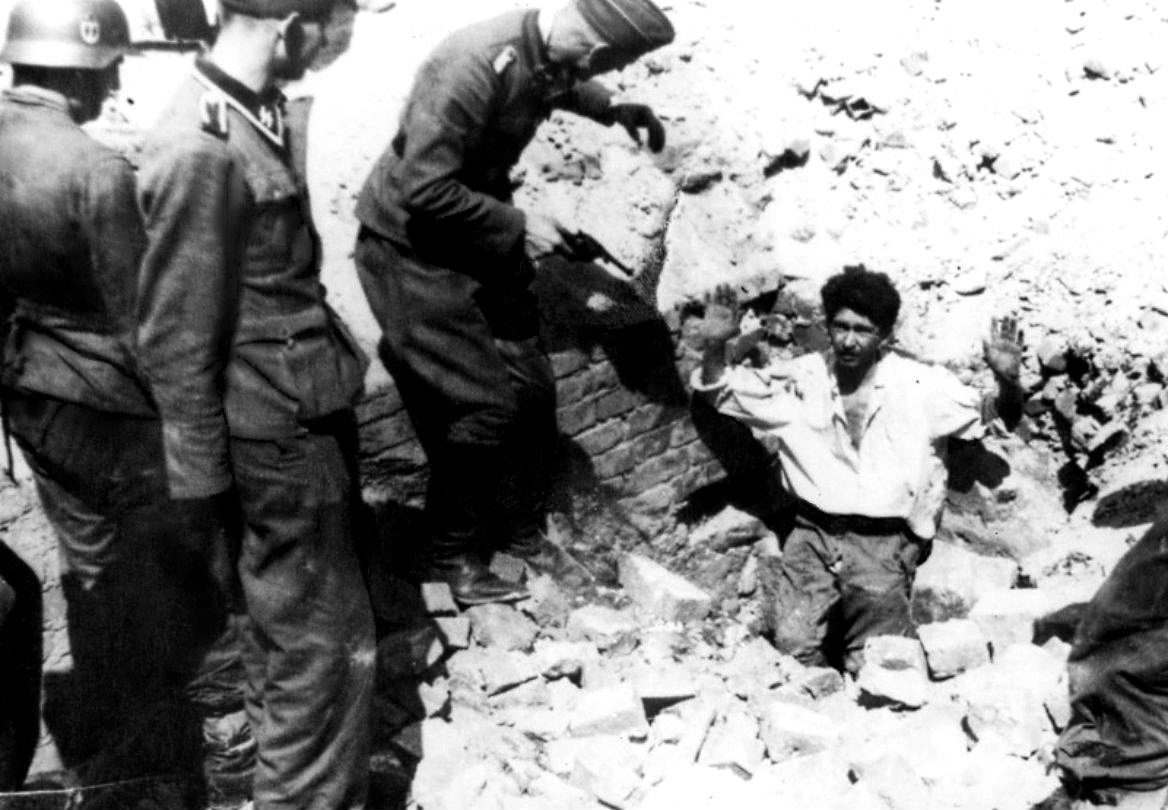
A resistance fighter being forced out of a bunker

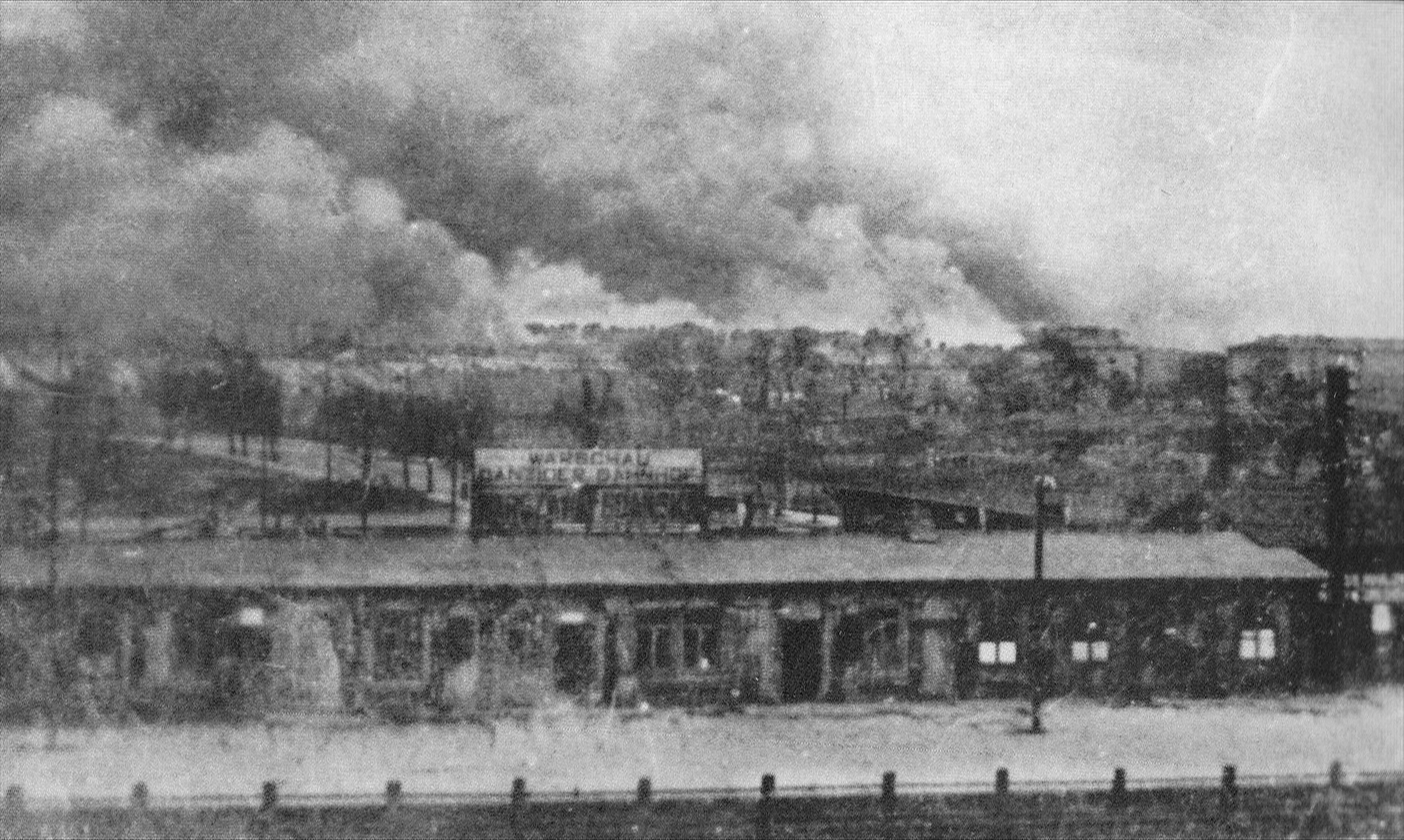
Burning ghetto viewed from Żoliborz district

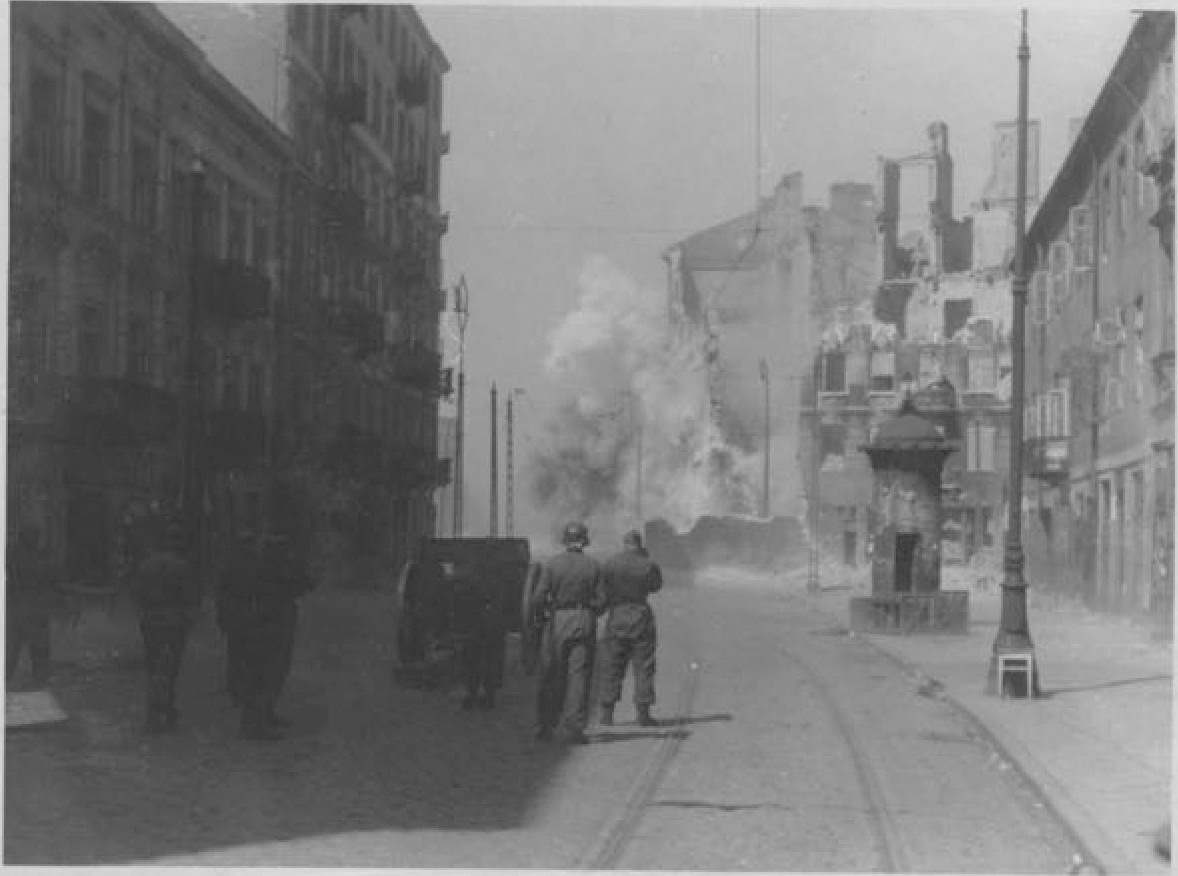
A German artillery crew firing at Zamenhof Street

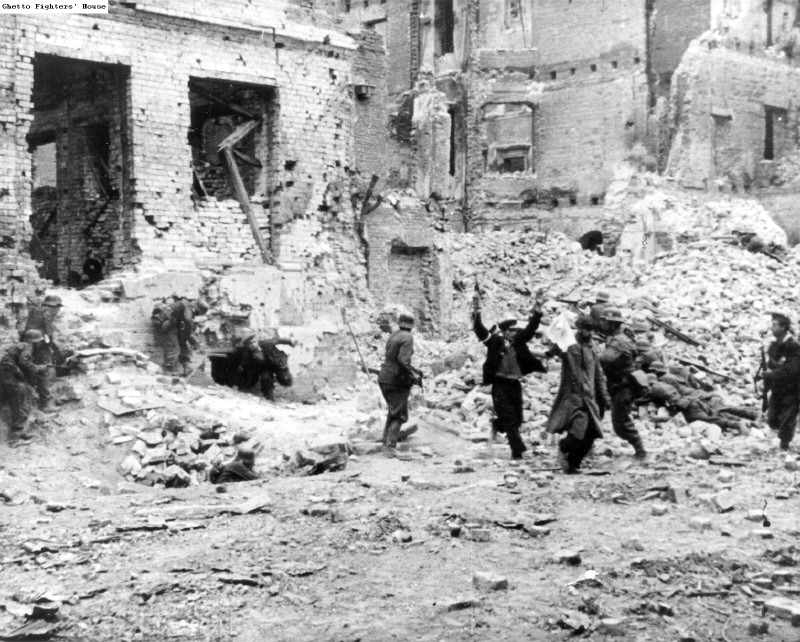
Jews emerging from a bunker and surrendering

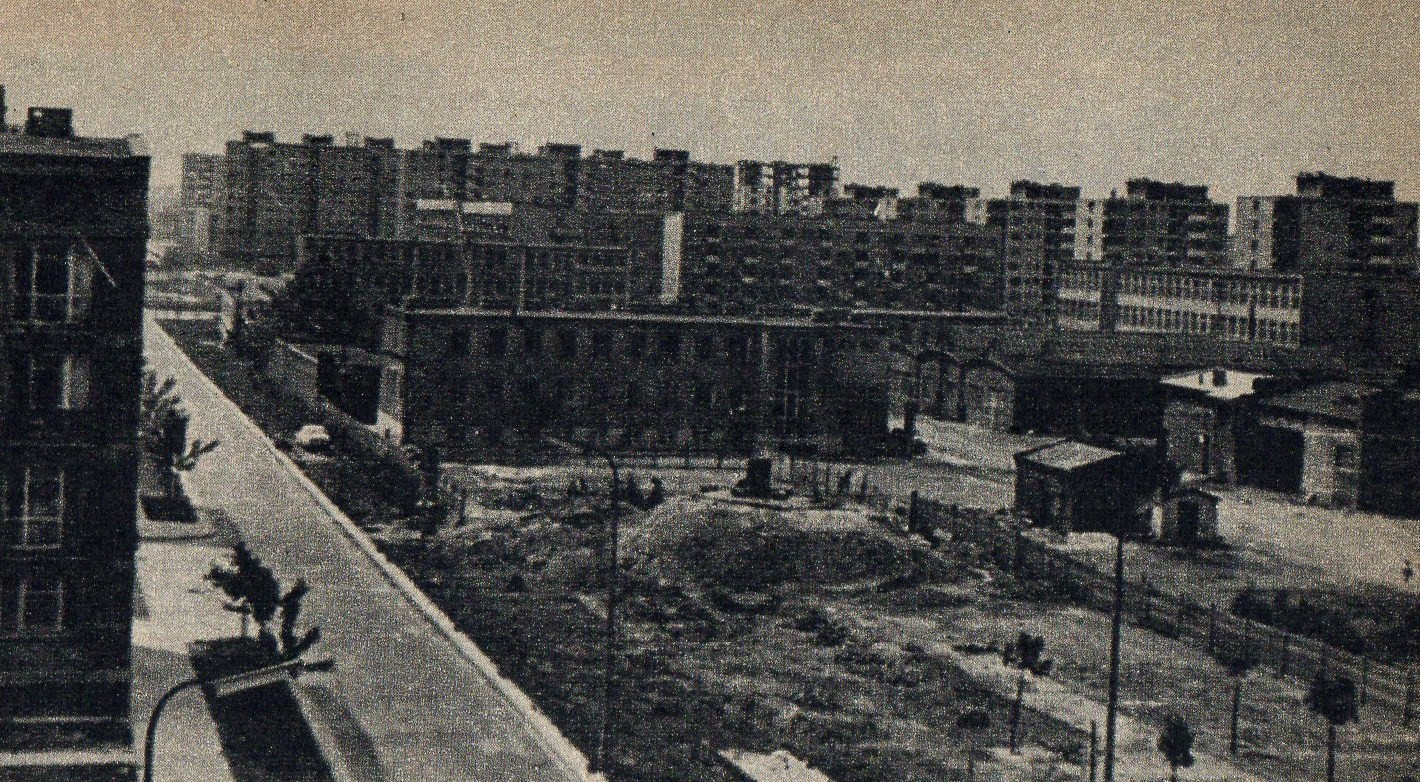
The site of Miła 18, former resistance base, in 1964

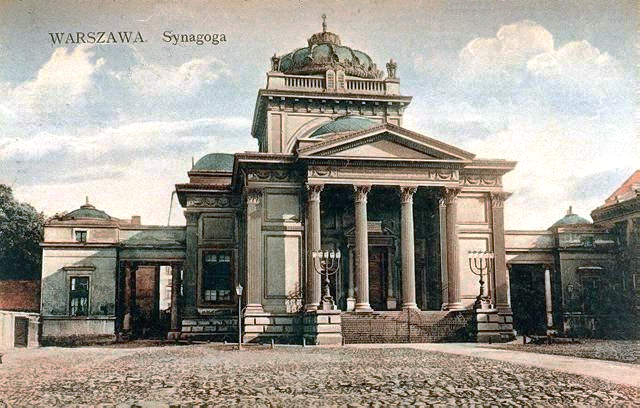
Great Synagogue of Warsaw, destroyed in 1943

On 19 April 1943, on the eve of Passover, the SS, order police, and Trawniki auxiliary forces began the operation to deport the residents of the ghetto. Under von Sammern-Frankenegg's orders, the deportation action was to be completed within three days. After the ghetto was surrounded at about 2:00 a.m. the ŻOB put it into a high state of preparedness. Fighters were ordered to remain at their positions, civilians were told to hide in the underground shelters, and flags were raised. The walls were also covered with statements such as "honorable death!" and "to arms! Women and children to the air raid shelters!"

The operation commenced at 3:00 a.m. German forces entered the ghetto in two columns. A car with a loudspeaker was sent in with the attackers, summoning the Jews to voluntarily leave their hiding places and report for transport. As the columns moved into the ghetto, they were ambushed by Jewish insurgents firing and tossing Molotov cocktails and hand grenades from alleyways, sewers, and windows. One column was ambushed at the intersection of Nalewki and Gęsia Streets while the other was ambushed at the intersection of Zamenhof and Miła Streets. The German forces sustained casualties and two of their combat vehicles (an armed conversion of a French-made Lorraine 37L light armored vehicle and an armored car) were set on fire by the insurgents' petrol bombs. The Germans retreated after hours of combat. By 8:00 a.m. von-Sammern-Frankenegg had been dismissed from his position as SS and Police Leader of Warsaw by Heinrich Himmler due to his failure to suppress the uprising. He was replaced by SS-Brigadeführer Jürgen Stroop, who rejected von Sammern-Frankenegg's proposal to call in bomber aircraft from Kraków. He led a better-organized and reinforced ground attack.

The remaining Jews knew that the Germans would murder them and decided to resist to the last. While the uprising was underway, the Bermuda Conference was held by the Allies from 19 to 29 April 1943 to discuss the Jewish refugee problem. Discussions included the question of Jewish refugees who had been liberated by Allied forces and those who still remained in German-occupied Europe.

Hours after the initial attack had been repulsed, the German forces, now under Stroop's command, reentered the ghetto. Rather than focusing on roundups, Stroop's plan was to assault the main insurgent positions so as to push them into a smaller area and destroy them. The main objective was to take control of the area between Zamenhof and Nalewki Streets. The first attack was launched against Zamenhof Street. The German forces encountered resistance and took casualties, but the insurgents were ultimately forced to retreat. At noon, they attacked Nalewki Street, and the insurgents retreated after fighting for six hours. The Germans also bombarded the hospital on Gęsia Street, after which they entered the damaged building and massacred the patients. They then launched an assault on Muranowski Square but were pinned down by fierce resistance and did not manage to take it. The square was defended by ŻZW fighters, who had a machine gun. At 8:00 p.m. Stroop ordered a pause in the assault. German forces retreated from the ghetto while sentries outside of it were reinforced.

The following day, the Germans returned to the ghetto and issued an ultimatum to the Jewish fighters, threatening that unless they surrendered the ghetto would be razed. The ghetto resistance groups ignored the ultimatum and the Germans resumed their attacks. The Germans launched a fresh assault on Muranowski Square. The ŻZW fighters there had been joined by five Polish Home Army fighters on 19 April who smuggled in weapons and ammunition and remained until the following day, losing two killed and two wounded in the fighting. The Germans were particularly determined to take down two flags the insurgents had raised from a building in the square, one Jewish and one Polish. The flags could be seen from most of Warsaw and inspired commentary in Polish underground publications as well as the Polish press in London. Stroop later remarked that "those flags had tremendous political and psychological importance. They unified Poland in a way nothing else could. Hundreds of thousands of people were inspired by the sight of them or the knowledge that they were there. A flag is as much a weapon as a hundred guns." He claimed that Himmler had instructed him to take those flags down whatever the cost. Although in his report Stroop claimed to have conquered the square and taken down the flags on 20 April, eyewitness accounts suggest that combat continued there until 22 April when the ŻZW fighters were forced to retreat. In addition, during the battle for the square Stroop's friend, SS-Untersturmführer Otto Dehmke, was killed in the fighting at Muranowski Square when gunfire detonated a hand grenade he was holding, and his death was listed as having occurred on 22 April. Stroop is thought to have had a few hundred Jewish prisoners summarily executed in retaliation for Dehmke's death.

On 20 April, heavy combat also took place on Miła Street and the area around the workshops but main battle centered around the brush factory. The assault there, which was personally led by Stroop, began at about 3:00 p.m. The insurgents repulsed the first attack, during which they detonated a hidden bomb as the Germans approached. After regrouping they launched another attack which again failed. The Germans then sent in the factory's director to negotiate with the insurgents, who rejected the offer. The fighting continued with the insurgents at the factory continuing to hold out. However, the Germans began setting fires which forced the resistance to retreat on the night of 21/22 April after evacuating civilians.

The slow progress in defeating the uprising was met with growing displeasure in Berlin. On 23 April, Himmler ordered that the operation should be continued "with greater harshness and relentless severity." Stroop decided to advance by systematically burning the ghetto down block by block using flamethrowers and fire bottles, and blowing up cellars, bunkers, and sewers. "We were beaten by the flames, not the Germans," survivor Marek Edelman said in 2007; he was deputy commander of the ŻOB and escaped the ghetto in its last days. In 2003, he recalled: "The sea of flames flooded houses and courtyards. ... There was no air, only black, choking smoke and heavy burning heat radiating from the red-hot walls, from the glowing stone stairs."

Surviving fighters and thousands of remaining Jewish civilians took cover in the sewer system and in the many dugout hiding places hidden among the ruins of the ghetto, referred to as "bunkers" by Germans and Jews alike. The Germans used dogs to detect such hideouts, then usually dropped smoke bombs to force people out. Sometimes they flooded these so-called bunkers or destroyed them with explosives. On occasions, shootouts occurred. A number of captured fighters lobbed hidden grenades or fired concealed handguns after surrendering.

Although some Jews turned themselves in for deportation out of hunger or despair, most remained in hiding while the insurgents continued to resist. While the resistance had until then mostly taken place above ground, the Jewish fighters now fought mainly from their bunkers. The ŻOB's tactic was to fire at approaching enemy forces from bunkers while a second group would attack from behind after emerging from a secret exit in the bunker system. The insurgents emerged from their bunkers mainly at night to launch raids, seize weapons, and carry out reconnaissance, usually dressing in German uniforms and wearing rags around their feet. They continued to make efforts to contact the Polish resistance outside the ghetto. Some fighters would manage to escape the ghetto and attempt to join partisan groups elsewhere. The "bunker wars" lasted an entire month, during which German progress was slowed.

While the battle continued inside the ghetto, Polish resistance groups AK and GL engaged the Germans between 19 and 23 April at six different locations outside the ghetto walls, firing at German sentries and positions. In one attack, three units of the AK under the command of Captain Józef Pszenny ("Chwacki") joined up in a failed attempt to breach the ghetto walls with explosives.

On 25 April, the insurgents suffered their single heaviest loss when a group of scouts trying to exit the ghetto through the sewers encountered an enemy patrol and was wiped out in a lopsided battle. On the following day, the Polish resistance outside the ghetto received what was probably the last report from the ŻOB's high command: "For eight days now we have been engaged in a deadly battle. The Germans suffered numerous losses, the first two days they were forced to retreat. Later on, they had reinforcements brought in, including tanks, armoured cars, artillery and even planes that came into action for the planned siege. Our losses, i.e. victims of fusillades and fires in which men, women and children were killed, are very significant. Our last days are approaching. But we will continue to fight and to resist as long as we hold weapons in our hands."

Fighting continued in several locations. Of the 26 streets in the ghetto, 20 were burning on 27 April. On the same day, the Germans took over several shelters at the workshop grounds by flooding them. According to the ŻOB's report: "A dense, caustic smoke hung in the streets of the ghetto." Many people jumped to their deaths from burning houses. In some cases, people tried to cushion their falls by throwing mattresses down first. Stroop wrote that "with broken bones, they tried to crawl through the streets into blocks of houses that were not yet or only partially on fire." Heavy fighting took place again at Muranowski Square. Eventually, the ŻZW lost all of its commanders and on 29 April, the remaining fighters from the organization escaped the ghetto through the Muranowski tunnel and relocated to the Michalin forest. In spite of these conditions, resistance continued with some leadership and coordination remaining, although communications between bunkers worsened.

As the fighting continued into May, the area of resistance became gradually smaller as the Germans advanced. The main battles took place on Miła, Dzika, Wołyńska and Szczęśliwa Streets. Fighting also took place in some adjacent streets. The ŻOB’s main command post was the Anielewicz Bunker at 18 Miła Street, with important bases also located at 35 Nalewki Street and 22 Franciscan Street. On 1 May, insurgents based at Nalewki Street launched a daytime attack which caused German troops to initially retreat before counterattacking, after which the insurgents fled to 18 Miła Street. The insurgents also held out on Franciscan Street from 1 to 3 May until the Germans used gas or smoke to drive the Jews out of shelter. About half were killed while the rest retreated to 18 Miła Street. The last battles of the workshop grounds were fought from 4 to 7 May, with the insurgents holding out despite ammunition shortages, hunger, and heavy losses. However, they continued to resist fiercely until the final hours. Several bunkers were destroyed by the Germans. Also on 7 May, the insurgents lost a group of scouts attempting to exit the ghetto walls.

On 8 May, the Germans assaulted the Anielewicz Bunker at 18 Miła Street. Most of the organization's remaining leadership and dozens of others committed mass suicide by ingesting cyanide, including Mordechai Anielewicz, the chief commander of ŻOB. His deputy Marek Edelman escaped the ghetto through the sewers with a handful of comrades two days later.

With the fall of the ŻOB's headquarters and the ghetto largely destroyed, organized resistance ended but small groups of insurgents continued to function independently. With no fixed bases, they moved constantly and only had sporadic contact with the Polish resistance. On the night of 13/14 May, the Soviet Air Forces bombed military objectives in Warsaw, with some bombs falling near the ghetto or on Pawiak Prison inside it. Taking advantage of the chaos, the Jewish fighters launched several attacks on German patrols. Several attempts were also made to flee the ghetto but only a small number of Jews succeeded. After the bombing, Jews continued to try to escape the cordon.

On 10 May, Szmul Zygielbojm, a Bundist member of the Polish government in exile, committed suicide in London to protest the lack of action on behalf of the Jews by the Allied governments. In his farewell note, he wrote:

I cannot continue to live and to be silent while the remnants of Polish Jewry, whose representative I am, are being murdered. My comrades in the Warsaw Ghetto fell with arms in their hands in the last heroic battle. I was not permitted to fall like them, together with them, but I belong with them, to their mass grave. By my death, I wish to give expression to my most profound protest against the inaction in which the world watches and permits the destruction of the Jewish people.

Besides claiming an estimated 56,065 Jews accounted for (although his own figures showed the number to be 57,065) and noting that "The number of destroyed dug-outs amounts to 631," in his official report dated 24 May 1943, Stroop listed the following as captured booty:

- 7 Polish Rifles
- 1 Russian Rifle
- 1 German Rifle
- 59 pistols of various calibers
- Several hundred hand grenades, including Polish and home-made ones
- Several hundred incendiary bottles
- Home-made explosives
- Infernal machines with fuses
- A large amount of explosives, ammunition for weapons of all calibers, including some machine-gun ammunition

Regarding the booty of arms, it must be taken into consideration that the arms themselves could in most cases not be captured, as the bandits and Jews would, before being arrested, throw them into hiding places or holes which could not be ascertained or discovered. The smoking out of the dug-out by our men, also often made the search for arms impossible. As the dug-outs had to be blown up at once, a search later on was out of the question. The captured hand grenades, ammunition, and incendiary bottles were at once reused by us against the bandits.

Further booty:

- 1,240 used military tunics (part of them with medal ribbons-Iron Cross and East Medal)
- 600 pairs of used trousers
- Other equipment and German steel helmets
- 108 horses, four captured in the former Ghetto (hearse)

Up to 23 May 1943 we had counted:
4.4 million zloty; furthermore about 5 to 6 million zloty not yet counted, a great amount of foreign currency, e.g. US$14,300 in paper and US$9,200 in gold, moreover valuables (rings, chains, watches, etc.) in great quantities.

State of the Ghetto at the termination of the large-scale operation:

Apart from 8 buildings (police barracks, hospital, and accommodations for housing working-parties), the former Ghetto is completely destroyed. Only the dividing walls are left standing where no explosions were carried out. But the ruins still contain a vast amount of stones and scrap material which could be used.

On 15 May, the last buildings in the ghetto except for the Great Synagogue of Warsaw and a few others were destroyed. The Great Synagogue itself was blown up a day later. Stroop personally detonated it. This was the last act of destruction in the suppression of the uprising. Stroop later recalled:

What a marvelous sight it was. A fantastic piece of theater. My staff and I stood at a distance. I held the electrical device which would detonate all the charges simultaneously. Jesuiter called for silence. I glanced over at my brave officers and men, tired and dirty, silhouetted against the glow of the burning buildings. After prolonging the suspense for a moment, I shouted: "Heil Hitler" and pressed the button. With a thunderous, deafening bang and a rainbow burst of colors, the fiery explosion soared toward the clouds, an unforgettable tribute to our triumph over the Jews. The Warsaw Ghetto was no more. The will of Adolf Hitler and Heinrich Himmler had been done.

Stroop subsequently informed Himmler and Friedrich-Wilhelm Krüger, the Higher SS and Police Leader of the General Government, that the ghetto had been destroyed.

Sporadic resistance continued, with the last skirmish taking place on 5 June 1943 between Germans and a holdout group of armed Jews without connections to the resistance organizations.

== Casualties ==
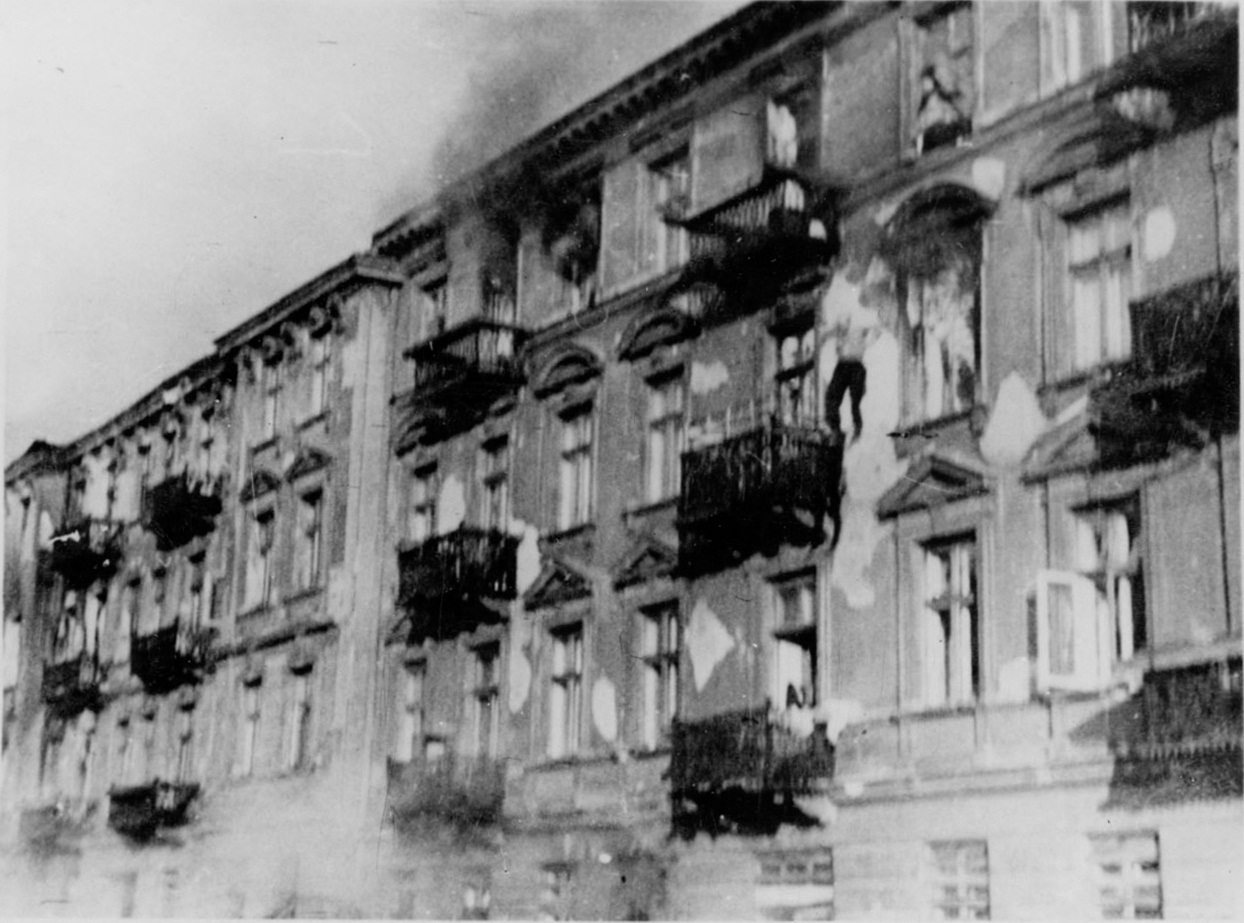
A man leaps to his death from the top story window of an apartment block to avoid capture. 23–25 Niska Street

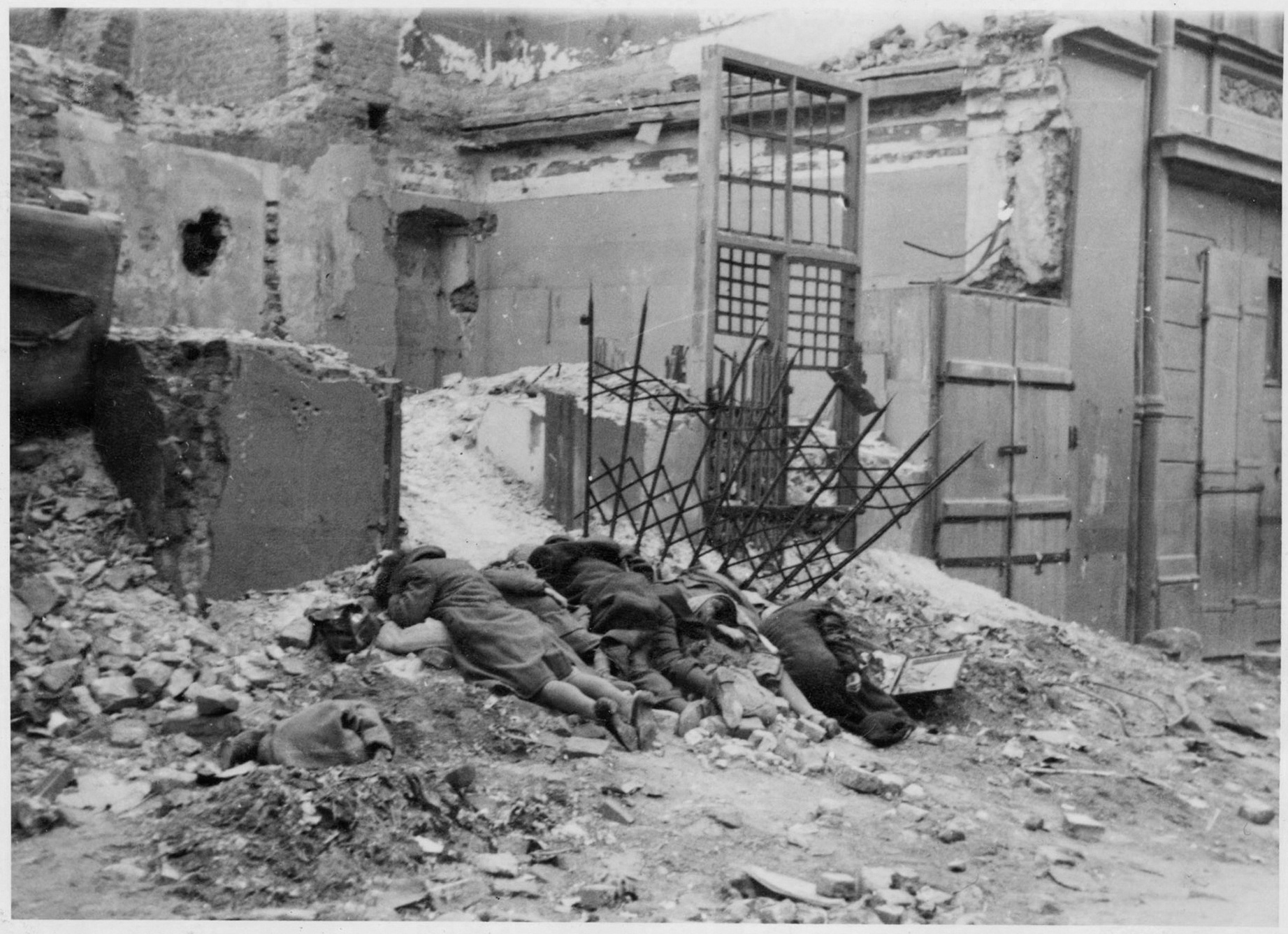
Bodies of Jews killed during the uprising

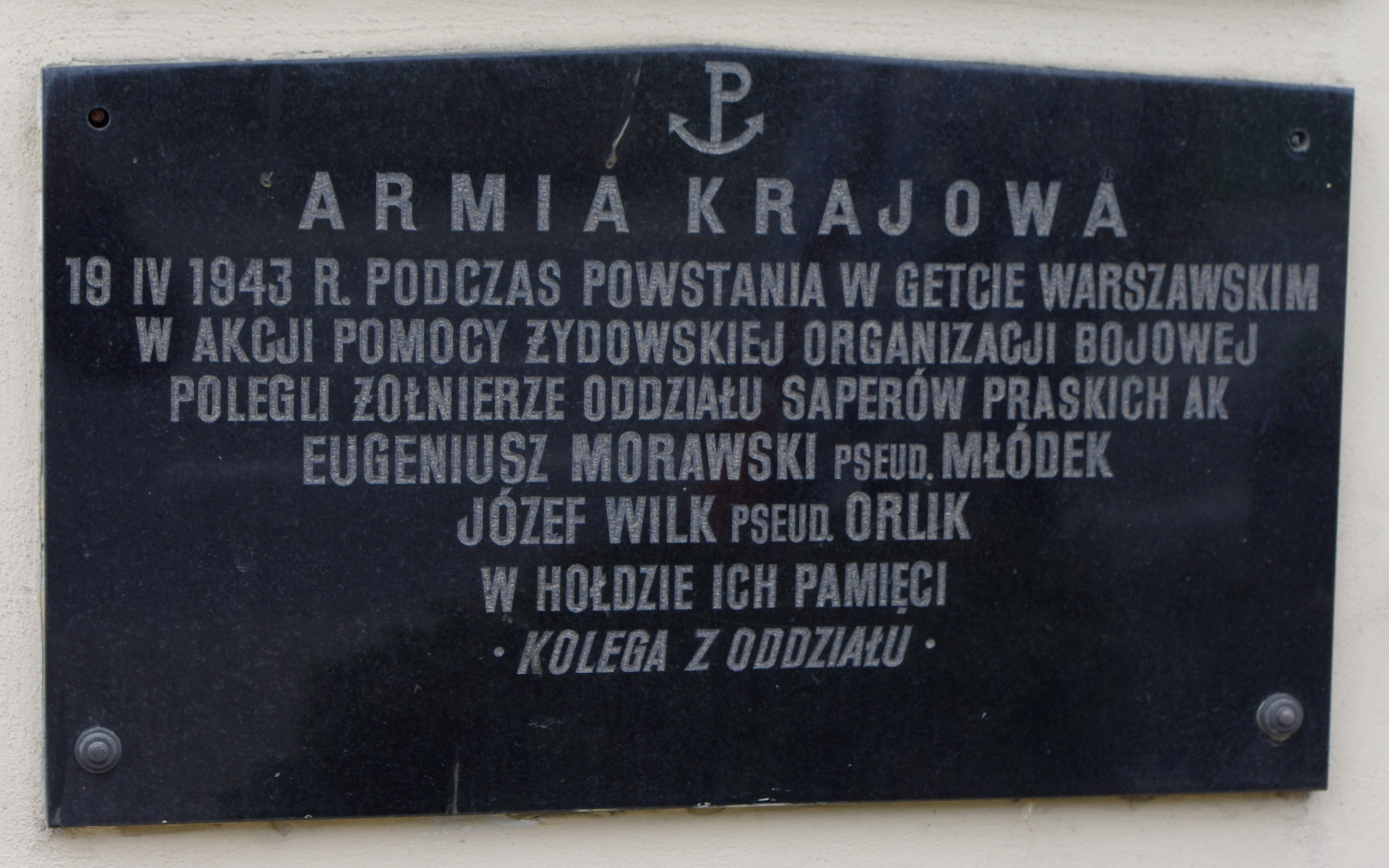
Plaque commemorating two Home Army soldiers killed during the Ghetto Action.

At least 13,000 Jews were killed in the uprising, including some 6,000 who were burnt alive or died from smoke inhalation. Almost all of the residents who survived the fighting in the ghetto were captured and shipped to the death camps of Majdanek and Treblinka.

The official figure presented in the Stroop report was 56,065 Jews killed or captured. Of them, 7,000 were killed in the ghetto and 6,929 were transported to the Treblinka extermination camp, meaning that at least 13,929 were killed. An additional 5,000-6,000 were estimated to have been killed by explosions and fires.

Jürgen Stroop's internal SS daily report for Friedrich-Wilhelm Krüger, written on 16 May 1943, stated:

180 Jews, bandits and sub-humans, were destroyed. The former Jewish quarter of Warsaw is no longer in existence. The large-scale action was terminated at 20:15 hours by blowing up the Warsaw Synagogue. ... Total number of Jews dealt with 56,065, including both Jews caught and Jews whose extermination can be proved. ... Apart from 8 buildings (police barracks, hospital, and accommodations for housing working-parties) the former Ghetto is completely destroyed. Only the dividing walls are left standing where no explosions were carried out.

According to the book Conversations with an Executioner, written by Kazimierz Moczarski, who was imprisoned alongside Stroop as well as SS-Untersturmführer Gustav Schielke, regarding the conversations they had, Stroop told his cellmates that the number was symbolism based on old Germanic astrology and that real figure was higher, comprising at least 10,000 more killed, as well as 2,000 more caught outside the ghetto in the "Aryan" area. Stroop also stated that as the troops had been "pushed too far", many ignored regulations and resorted to "settling scores" without informing their commanding officers, which may have resulted in another thousand Jews killed. In addition, another two to three thousand Jews were killed and captured after the official end of the action on 16 May. According to Stroop, the real figure of Jews killed or captured as a result of the operation may have been over 71,000.

According to historian Israel Gutman, who had been a resistance fighter during the uprising, the official figure of 56,065 killed or captured was likely exaggerated as it implied that over 60,000 Jews were in the ghetto. He estimated that there were no more than 40,000 Jews present in the ghetto by the time of the April uprising, and that German units operating in the ghetto deliberately inflated their statistics.

The Stroop report's casualty list records that German forces suffered 110 casualties – 16 killed and 93 injured – of whom 101 are listed by name. These figures did not include Jewish collaborators but did include the Trawniki men and Polish police under his command. Of the 16 personnel reported as killed in action, 13 were SS, Wehrmacht, or order police personnel, two were Trawniki men, and one was a Polish policeman. Those wounded and listed by name in his report include 60 Waffen-SS soldiers, 11 Trawniki men, 12 Sicherheitspolizei officers, 5 Polish policemen, and 2 Wehrmacht soldiers.

Other sources have questioned the number of German casualties. Marek Edelman claimed that the German casualties amounted to 300 killed and wounded. The official German casualty figures were kept low, while the propaganda bulletins of the Polish Underground State, claimed that hundreds of occupiers had been killed in the fighting. Jewish sources also claimed that there were hundreds of German casualties. Gutman wrote that there were discrepancies in the German casualty figures in Stroop's daily reports as opposed to his final one, but this does not change the broader picture as the gap between Stroop's two versions and casualty figures by Polish and Jewish sources was still high. According to Gutman, it is likely that Stroop and Krüger deliberately downplayed German losses to underplay the uprising's gravity, but Stroop's tendency to treat the suppression of the uprising as a full-scale military operation, depict those killed in the fighting as heroes, and request medals for himself and his men for their part in the operation cannot be ignored. Gutman wrote that "the number cited by Stroop cannot be rejected out of hand, but it is likely that his list was neither complete, free of errors, nor indicative of the German losses throughout the entire period of resistance, until the absolute liquidation of Jewish life in the ghetto. All the same, the German casualty figures cited by the various Jewish sources are probably highly exaggerated. It is easy to understand how the magnitude of the fighting and the fighters' ability to strike at the Germans and paralyze their advance created an impression that the number of casualties was very high. Yet we must consider the fact that the arms wielded by the Jewish fighters were primitive and largely ineffective against the advanced and expedient weaponry used by the Germans." Raul Hilberg cited the official German casualty figures as accurate in The Destruction of the European Jews. Military expert and historian Anthony Tucker-Jones wrote that Stroop's casualty figure is "suspiciously low."

Moczarski wrote that in the conversations between himself, Schielke, and Stroop, the latter was repeatedly challenged on his official figures for German losses when he told them his figures for fighting on certain days, as they were implausibly low. At one point, after Stroop claimed that his forces had suffered no losses in fourteen and a half hours of fighting, Schielke told him "Herr Gruppenführer, let me beg you again not to make false statements about our killed and wounded. I know that in the reports prepared for you by that statistical sleight-of-hand man Jesuiter, you were ordered by Krüger and advised by Hahn to hide the truth. After all, why would you want to admit that substantial numbers of soldiers and policemen were killed under your command? But why lie to us, your cellmates? I repeat that no one is going to believe those trumped up figures about German losses in the Ghetto fighting. They were clearly circulated for propaganda purposes." According to Moczarski, Stroop pretended to ignore this but it "must have struck home" as he mentioned little more about German losses from then on.

German daily losses of killed/wounded and the official figures for killed or captured Jews and "bandits", according to the Stroop report:

- 19 April: 1 killed, 24 wounded; 580 captured
- 20 April: 3 killed, 10 wounded; 533 captured
- 21 April: 0 killed, 5 wounded; 5,200 captured
- 22 April: 3 killed, 1 wounded; 6,580 captured; 203 "Jews and bandits" killed; 35 Poles killed outside the Ghetto
- 23 April: 0 killed, 3 wounded; 4,100 captured; 200 "Jews and bandits" killed; 3 Jews captured outside the Ghetto.Total of 19,450 Jews reported caught
- 24 April: 0 killed, 3 wounded; 1,660 captured; 1,811 "pulled out of dugouts, about 330 shot".
- 25 April: 0 killed, 4 wounded; 1,690 captured; 274 shot; "very large portion of the bandits ... captured". Total of 27,464 Jews caught
- 26 April: 0 killed, 0 wounded; 1,722 captured; 1,330 "destroyed"; 362 Jews shot. 30 Jews "displaced". Total of 29,186 Jews captured
- 27 April: 0 killed, 4 wounded; 2,560 captured of whom 547 shot; 24 Polish "bandits killed in battle"; 52 Polish "bandits" arrested. Total of 31,746 Jews caught
- 28 April: 0 killed, 3 wounded; 1,655 captured of whom 110 killed; 10 "bandits" killed and 9 "arrested". Total of 33,401 Jews caught
- 29 April: 0 killed 0 wounded; 2,359 captured of whom 106 killed
- 30 April: 0 killed 0 wounded; 1,599 captured of whom 179 killed. Total of 37,359 Jews caught
- 1 May: 2 killed, 2 wounded; 1,026 captured of whom 245 killed. Total of 38,385 Jews caught; 150 killed outside the Ghetto
- 2 May: 0 killed, 7 wounded; 1,852 captured and 235 killed. Total of 40,237 Jews caught
- 3 May: 0 killed, 3 wounded; 1,569 captured and 95 killed. Total of 41,806 Jews caught
- 4 May: 0 killed, 0 wounded; 2,238 captured, of whom 204 shot. Total of 44,089 Jews caught
- 5 May: 0 killed, 2 wounded; 2,250 captured
- 6 May: 2 killed, 1 wounded; 1,553 captured; 356 shot
- 7 May: 0 killed, 1 wounded; 1,109 captured; 255 shot. Total of 45,342 Jews caught
- 8 May: 2 killed, 3 wounded; 1,091 captured and 280 killed; 60 "heavily armed bandits" caught
- 9 May: 0 killed, 0 wounded; 1,037 "Jews and bandits" caught and 319 "bandits and Jews" shot. Total of 51,313 Jews caught; 254 "Jews and bandits" shot outside the Ghetto
- 10 May: 0 killed, 4 wounded; 1,183 caught and 187 "bandits and Jews" shot. Total of 52,693 Jews caught
- 11 May: 1 killed, 2 wounded; 931 "Jews and bandits" caught and 53 "bandits" shot. Total of 53,667 Jews caught
- 12 May: 0 killed, 1 wounded; 663 caught and 133 shot. Total of 54,463 Jews caught
- 13 May: 2 killed, 4 wounded; 561 caught and 155 shot. Total of 55,179 Jews caught
- 14 May: 0 killed, 5 wounded; 398 caught and 154 "Jews and bandits" shot. Total of 55,731 Jews caught
- 15 May: 0 killed, 1 wounded; 87 caught and 67 "bandits and Jews" shot. Total of 56,885 Jews caught
- 16 May: 0 killed, 0 wounded; 180 "Jews, bandits and subhumans destroyed". Total of 57,065 Jews either captured or killed

== Aftermath ==
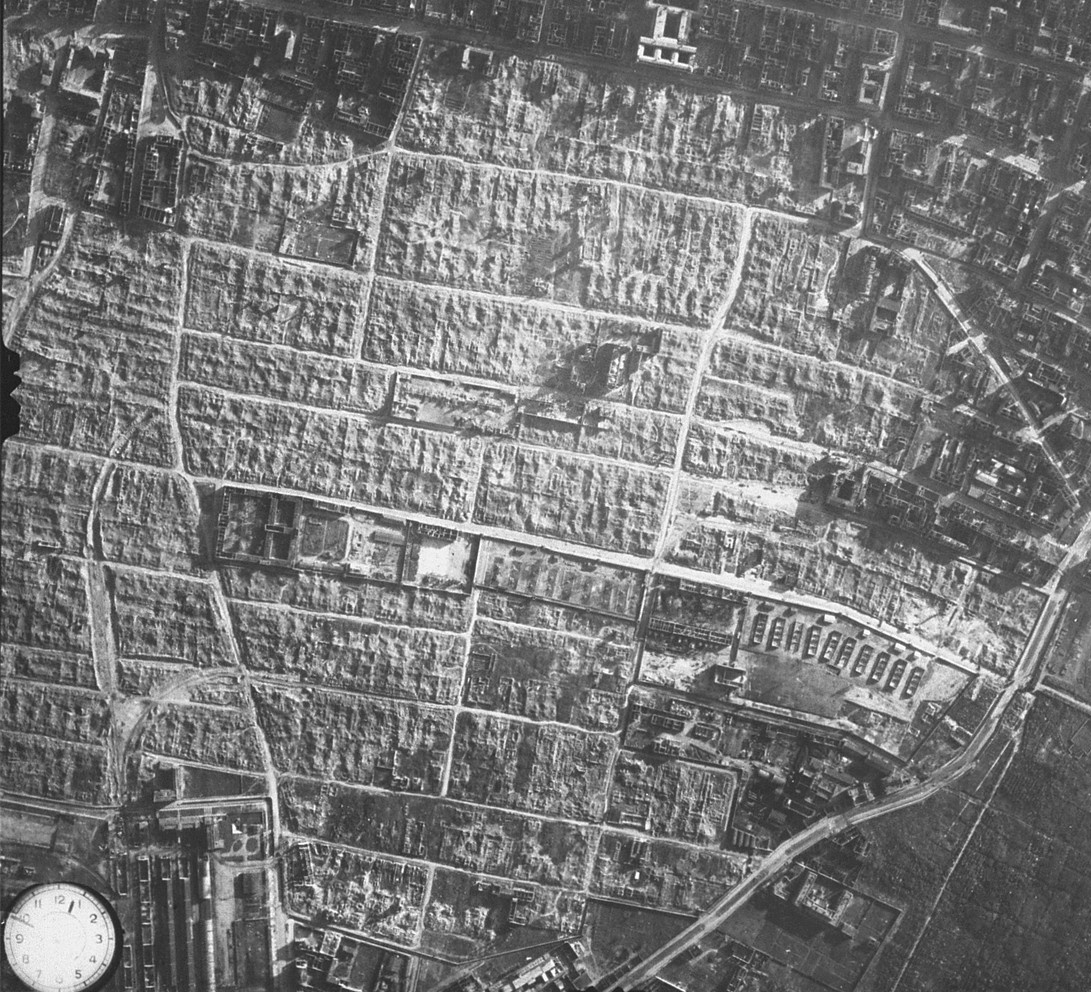
Aerial photograph of the ruins of the Warsaw Ghetto and the Warsaw concentration camp (the long and narrow rectangle in the image's centre) surrounded by the ghetto's ruins. Probably taken in November 1944.

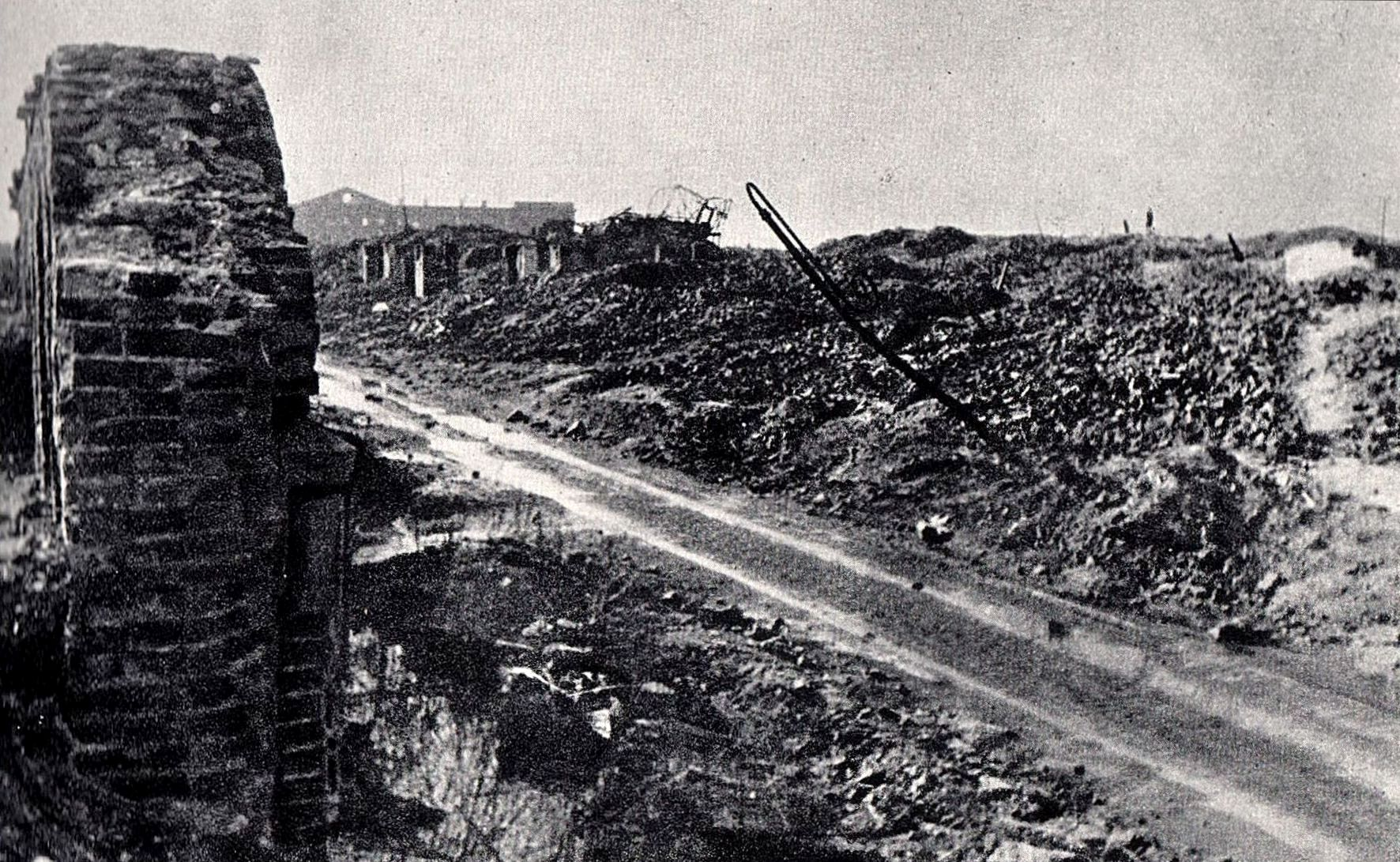
Warsaw Ghetto area after the war. Gęsia Street, view to the west

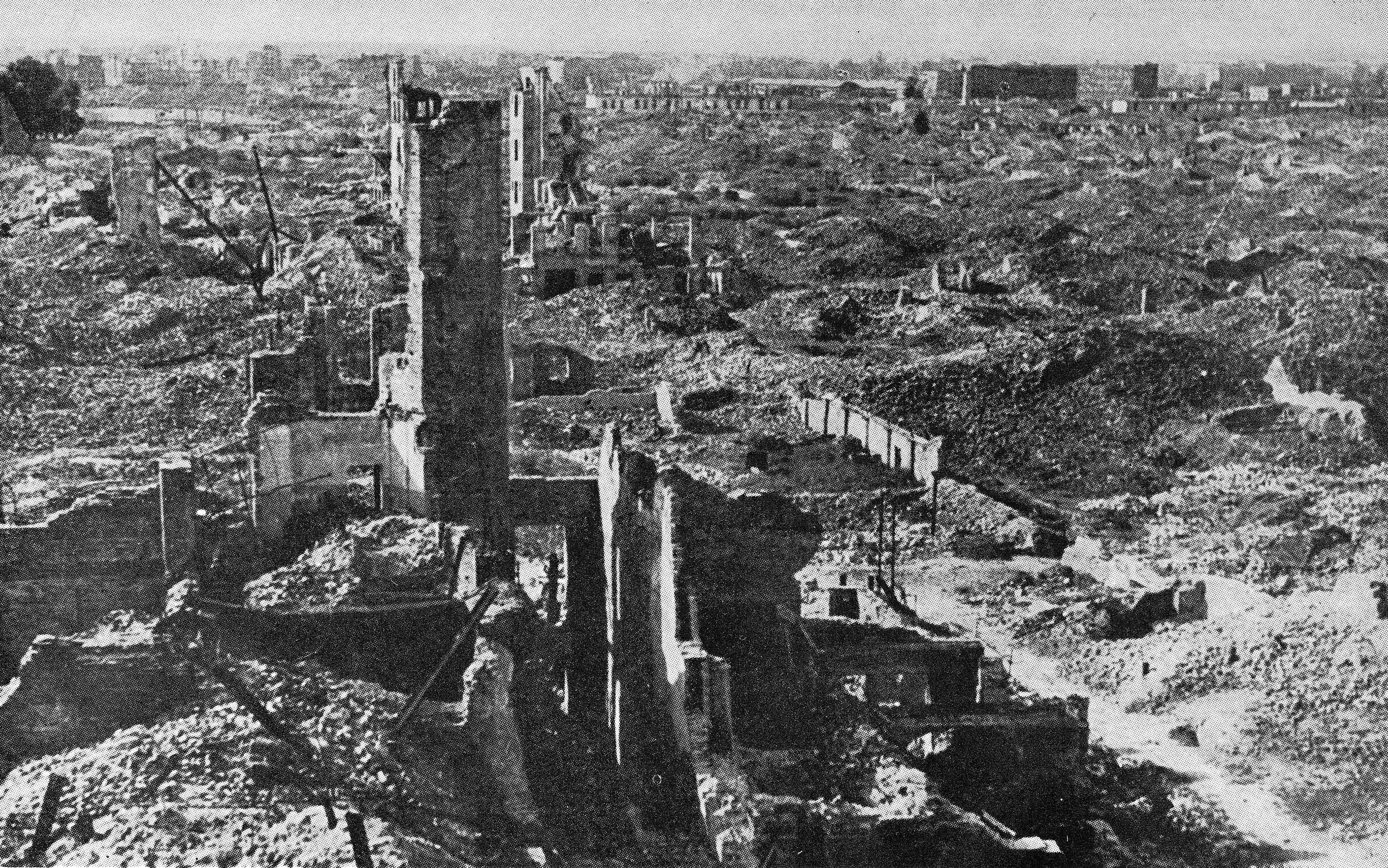
Ruins of the Warsaw Ghetto after the war

After the uprising was over, most of the incinerated houses were razed, and the Warsaw concentration camp complex was established in the ghetto's ruins. Thousands of people died in the camp or were executed in the ruins of the ghetto. The SS hunted Jews hiding in the ruins. On 19 April 1943, the first day of the most significant period of the resistance, 7,000 Jews were transported from the Warsaw Ghetto to Treblinka extermination camp. Many purportedly developed resistance groups and helped to plan and execute the revolt and mass escape of 2 August 1943. From May 1943 to August 1944, executions in the ruins of the ghetto were carried out by:

- Officers of the Warsaw SD facility and the security police, under the supervision of Dr. Ludwig Hahn, whose seat was located in Szuch Avenue;
- Pawiak staff members;
- KL Warschau staff members;
- SS-men from the Third Battalion of the 23rd SS Regiment and the Police (Battalion III/SS-Polizei Regiment 23), commanded by Major Otton Bundtke. (Note: Bundtke's Battalion stayed in the former ghetto and worked on pacifying it after the official suppression of the uprising.)

Open and secret executions carried out in Warsaw were led by SS-Obersturmführer Norbert Bergh-Trips, SS-Haupturmführer Paul Werner and SS-Obersturmführer Walter Witossek. The latter often presided over the police "trio", signing mass death sentences for Polish political prisoners, which were later pronounced by the ad hoc court of the security police.

In October 1943, Bürkl was tried and condemned to death in absentia by the Polish Resistance's Underground court, and shot dead by the AK in Warsaw, a part of Operation Heads that targeted notorious SS officers. That same month, von Sammern-Frankenegg was killed by Yugoslav Partisans in an artillery barrage near Banja Luka. Himmler, Globocnik and Krüger all committed suicide at the end of the war in Europe in May 1945.

The General Government Governor of Warsaw at the time of the Uprising, Dr. Ludwig Fischer, was tried and executed in 1947. Stroop was captured by American forces in Germany, convicted of war crimes in two trials (U.S. military and Polish), and executed by hanging in Poland in 1952, along with Warsaw Ghetto SS administrator Franz Konrad. Stroop's aide, Erich Steidtmann, was exonerated for "minimal involvement"; he died in 2010 while under investigation for war crimes. Sturmbannführer Hermann Höfle who helped carry out the July 1942 Grossaktion Warsaw committed suicide after being arrested in 1962. Walter Bellwidt, who commanded a Waffen-SS battalion among Stroop's forces, died on 13 October 1965. Hahn went into hiding until 1975, when he was apprehended and sentenced to life for crimes against humanity; he served eight years and died in 1986. SS Oberführer Arpad Wigand who served with von Sammern-Frankenberg as SS and Police Leader in Warsaw from 4 August 1941 to 23 April 1943 was tried for war crimes in Hamburg Germany in 1981 and sentenced to 12.5 years in prison; died 26 July 1983. Walter Reder reportedly served in the SS Panzer Grenadier Training Battalion III; he served a jail sentence in Italy from 1951 to 1985 for war crimes committed in 1944 in Italy and died in 1991. Josef Blösche was tried for war crimes in East Germany and executed in 1969. Heinrich Klaustermeyer was tried for war crimes in 1965 and sentenced to life in prison. In 1976, he was released from prison on the grounds of his advanced cancer and died 13 days later.

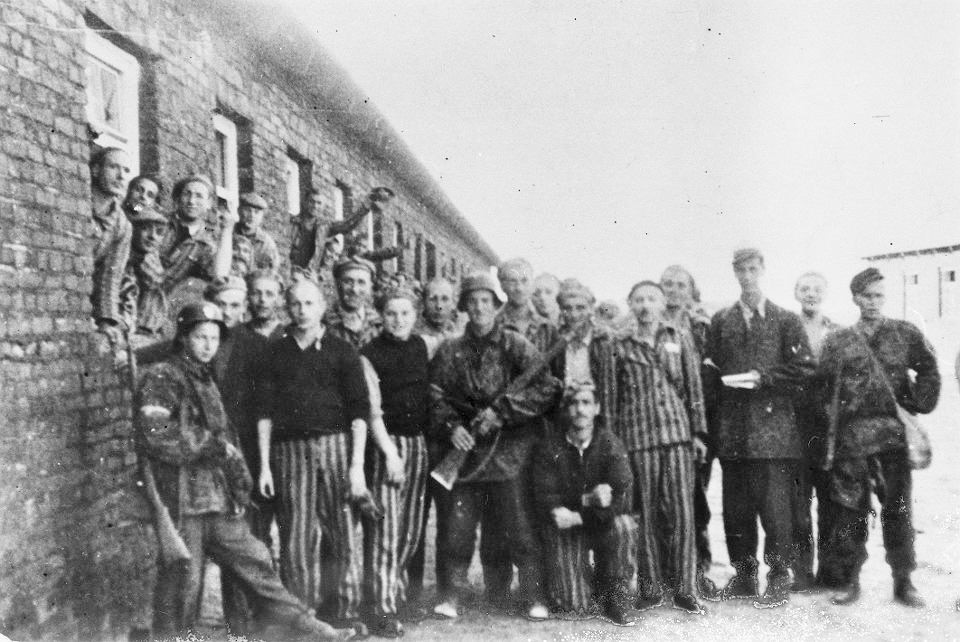
Jewish prisoners liberated from the concentration camp Gęsiówka and the Battalion Zośka fighters during the Warsaw Uprising in August 1944

The Warsaw Ghetto Uprising of 1943 took place over a year before the Warsaw Uprising of 1944. The ghetto had been destroyed by the time of the general uprising in the city, which was part of the Operation Tempest, a nationwide insurrection plan. During the Warsaw Uprising, the Polish Home Army's Battalion Zośka was able to rescue 380 Jewish prisoners (mostly foreign) held in the concentration camp "Gęsiówka" set up by the Germans in an area adjacent to the ruins of former ghetto. These prisoners had been brought from Auschwitz and forced to clear the remains of the ghetto. A few small groups of ghetto residents also managed to survive in the undetected "bunkers" and to eventually reach the "Aryan side". Several hundred survivors from the first uprising took part in the later uprising (mostly in non-combat roles such as logistics and maintenance, due to their physical state and general shortage of arms), joining the ranks of the Polish Home Army and the Armia Ludowa. According to Samuel Krakowski from the Jewish Historical Institute, "The Warsaw Ghetto Uprising had a real influence ... in encouraging the activity of the Polish underground."

A number of survivors of the Warsaw Ghetto Uprising, known as the "Ghetto Fighters", went on to create the kibbutz Lohamei HaGeta'ot (literally: "Ghetto Fighters'"), which is located north of Acre, Israel. The founding members of the kibbutz include Yitzhak Zuckerman (Icchak Cukierman), who represented the ŻOB on the 'Aryan' side, and his wife Zivia Lubetkin, who commanded a fighting unit. In 1984, members of the kibbutz published Daphei Edut ("Testimonies of Survival"), four volumes of personal testimonies from 96 kibbutz members. The settlement features a museum and archives dedicated to remembering the Holocaust. Yad Mordechai, a kibbutz just north of the Gaza Strip, was named after Mordechaj Anielewicz. In 2008, Israel Defense Forces Chief of Staff Gabi Ashkenazi led a group of Israeli officials to the site of the uprising and spoke about the event's "importance for IDF combat soldiers".

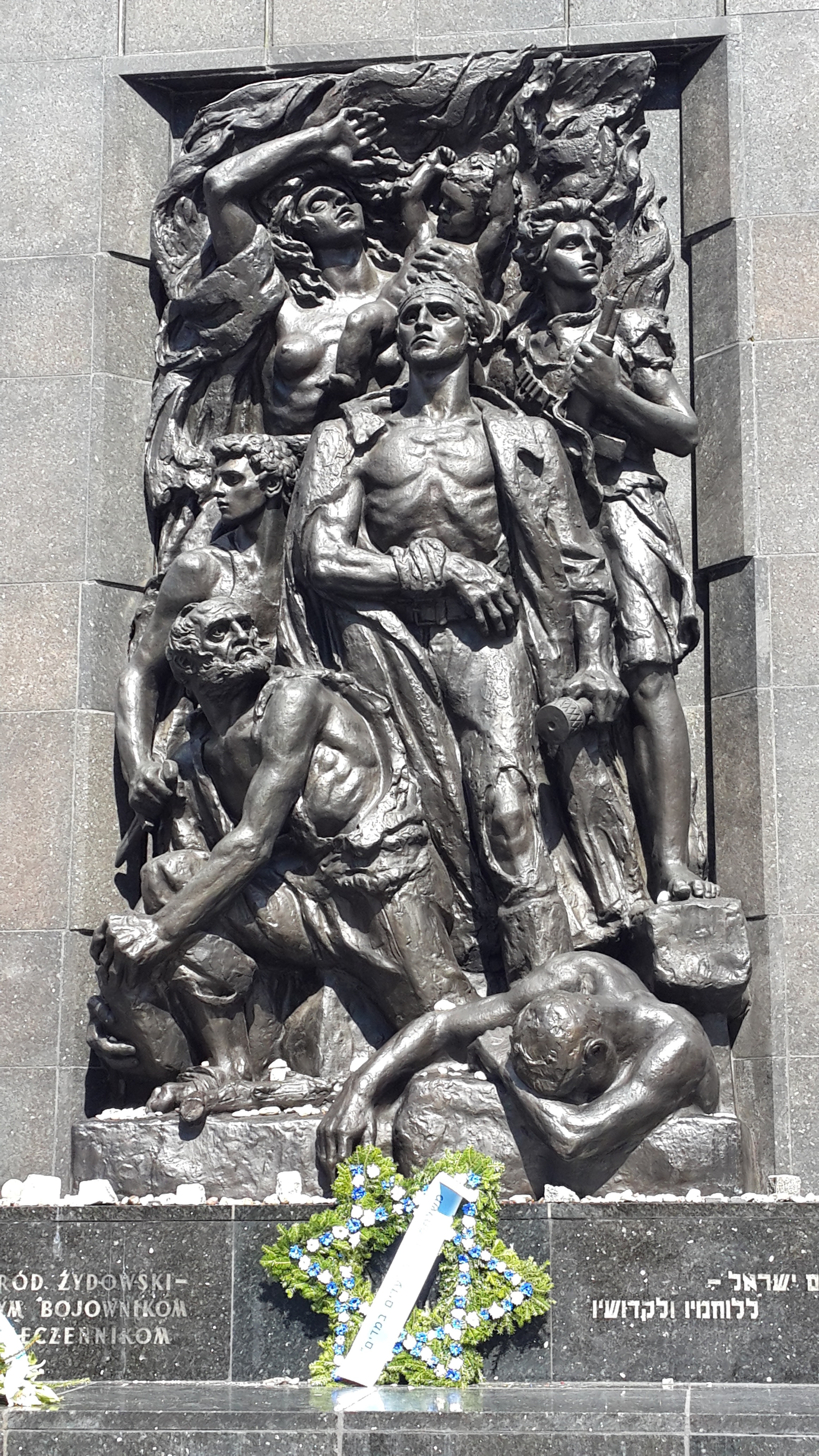
Monument to the Ghetto Heroes by Nathan Rapoport

In 1968, the 25th anniversary of the Warsaw Ghetto Uprising, Zuckerman was asked what military lessons could be learned from the uprising. He replied:

I don't think there's any real need to analyze the Uprising in military terms. This was a war of less than a thousand people against a mighty army and no one doubted how it was likely to turn out. This isn't a subject for study in military school. (...) If there's a school to study the human spirit, there it should be a major subject. The important things were inherent in the force shown by Jewish youth after years of degradation, to rise up against their destroyers, and determine what death they would choose: Treblinka or Uprising.

On 7 December 1970, West German Chancellor Willy Brandt spontaneously knelt while visiting the Monument to the Ghetto Heroes memorial in the People's Republic of Poland. At the time, the action surprised many and was the focus of controversy, but it has since been credited with helping improve relations between the NATO and Warsaw Pact countries. Many people from the United States and Israel came for the 1983 commemoration. The last surviving Jewish resistance fighter, Michael Smuss, died on 21 October 2025 at the age of 99. Previously, Simcha Rotem had been credited as the last surviving fighter. He died in Jerusalem on 22 December 2018 at age 94.

== Opposing forces ==
=== Jewish ===
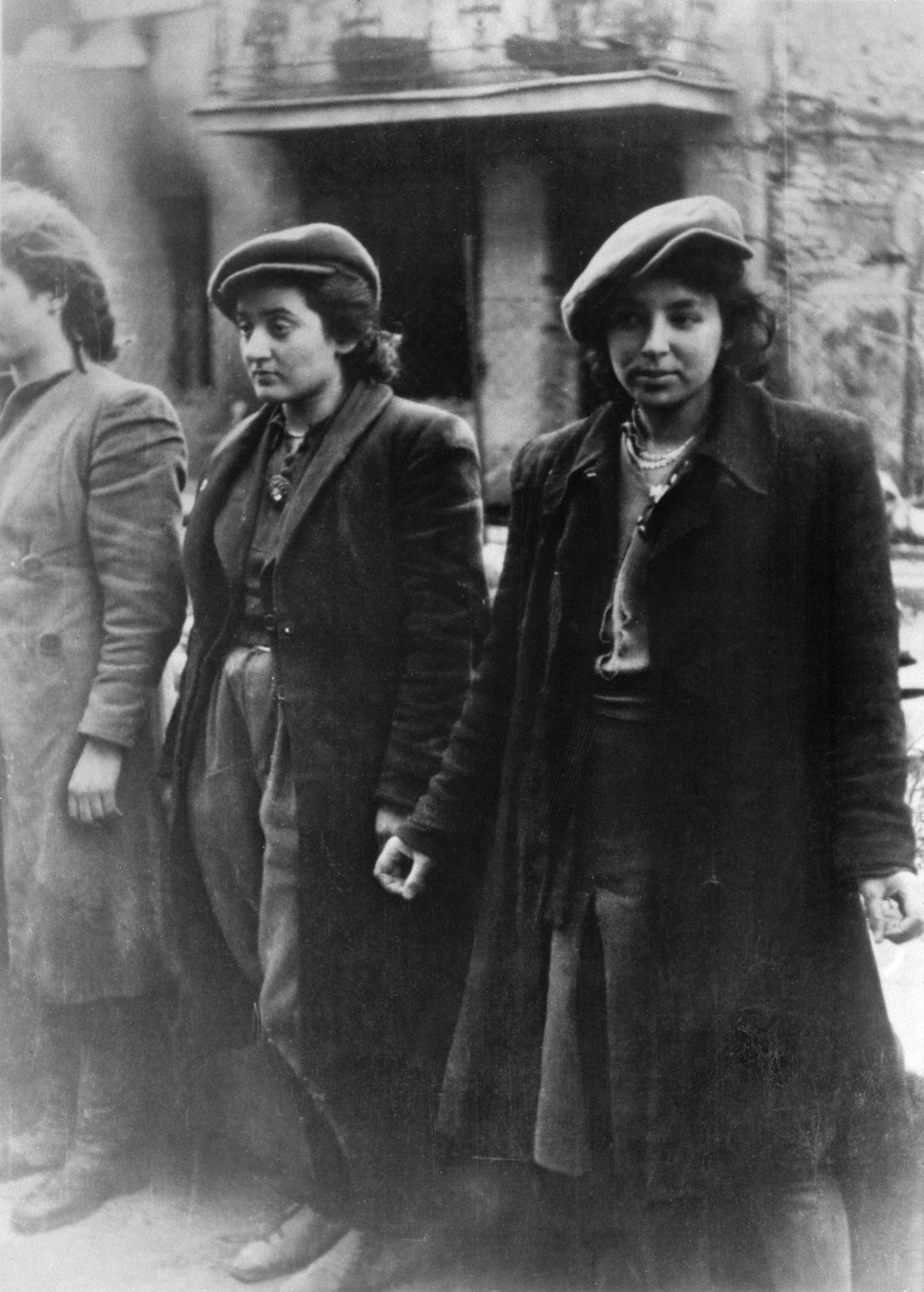
From right: Małka Zdrojewicz, Bluma and Rachela Wyszogrodzka captured after offering armed resistance.

Two Jewish underground organisations fought in the Warsaw Uprising: the left wing ŻOB founded in July 1942 by Zionist Jewish youth groups within the Warsaw Ghetto; and the right wing ŻZW, or Jewish Military Union, a national organization founded in 1939 by former Polish military officers of Jewish background which had strong ties to the Polish Home Army and cells in almost every major town across Poland. However, both organisations were officially incorporated into the Polish Home Army and its command structure in exchange for weapons and training.

Marek Edelman, who was the only surviving uprising commander from the left-wing ŻOB, stated that the ŻOB had 220 fighters and each was armed with a handgun, grenades, and Molotov cocktails. His organization had three rifles in each area, as well as two land mines and one submachine gun. Due to its socialist leanings, the Soviets and Israel promoted the actions of ŻOB as the dominant or only party in the Warsaw Ghetto Uprising, a view often adopted by secondary sources in the West.

The right-wing faction ŻZW, which was founded by former Polish officers, was larger, more established and had closer ties with the Polish Home Army, making it better equipped. Zimmerman describes the arms supplies for the uprising as "limited but real". Specifically, Jewish fighters of the ŻZW received from the Polish Home Army: 2 heavy machine guns, 4 light machine guns, 21 submachine guns, 30 rifles, 50 pistols, and over 400 grenades for the uprising. During the Uprising, ŻZW is reported to have had about 400 well-armed fighters grouped in 11 units, with 4 units including fighters from the Polish Home Army. Due to the ŻZW's anti-socialist stand and close ties with the Polish Home Army (which was subsequently outlawed by the Soviets), the Soviets suppressed publication of books and articles on ŻZW after the war and downplayed its role in the uprising, in favor of the more socialist ŻOB.

More weapons were supplied throughout the uprising, and some were captured from the Germans. Some weapons were handmade by the resistance; sometimes such weapons worked.

Shortly before the uprising, Polish-Jewish historian Emanuel Ringelblum (who managed to escape from the Warsaw Ghetto but was later discovered and executed in 1944) visited a ŻZW armoury hidden in the basement at 7 Muranowska Street. In his notes, which form part of Oneg Shabbat archives, he reported:

They were armed with revolvers stuck in their belts. Different kinds of weapons were hung in the large rooms: light machine guns, rifles, revolvers of different kinds, hand grenades, bags of ammunition, German uniforms, etc., all of which were utilized to the full in the April "action". (...) While I was there, a purchase of arms was made from a former Polish Army officer, amounting to a quarter of a million zloty; a sum of 50,000 zlotys was paid on account. Two machine guns were bought at 40,000 złoty each, and a large amount of hand grenades and bombs.

Although the Home Army's stocks were meager, and general provision of arms limited, the right-wing ŻZW received significant quantities of armaments, including some heavy and light machine guns, submachine guns, rifles, pistols and grenades. (Note: Specifically, Jewish fighters of the Jewish Military Union (ŻZW) received from the Polish Home Army: 2 heavy machine guns, 4 light machine guns, 21 submachine guns, 30 rifles, 50 pistols, and over 400 grenades for the ghetto uprising.)

=== Polish ===
Due to the nature of the conflict and that it took place within the confines of German-guarded Ghetto, the role of the Polish Home Army was primarily one of ancillary support; namely, the provision of arms, ammunition and training. However, according to Marian Fuks, the Ghetto uprising would not have been possible without assistance from the Polish Resistance. Before the uprising started, the most important aid from the Polish resistance to the Jewish resistance took part of weapon smuggling and delivery. Some of the earliest weapons delivered to the ghetto in mid-1942 came from the communist Gwardia Ludowa group, which in August 1942 provided Jewish resistance with 9 pistols and 5 hand grenades'. Antoni Chruściel, commander of the Home Army in Warsaw, ordered the entire armory of the Wola district transferred to the ghetto. In January 1943 the Home Army delivered a larger shipment: 50 pistols, 50 hand grenades' and several kilograms of explosives, and together with a number of smaller shipments transferred around that time a total of 70 pistols, 10 rifles, 2 hand machine guns, 1 light machine gun, as well as ammunition and over 150 kilograms of explosives. Acquisition of weapons was supported from both Jewish and Polish funds, including those of Żegota. The Home Army also provided intelligence on German movements, connected Jewish resistance to some black market channels, and provided planning assistance for plans to defend the ghetto and safeguard the refugees. The Home Army also disseminated information and appeals to help the Jews in the ghetto, both in Poland and by way of radio transmissions to the Allies, which fell largely on deaf ears.

In mid-April at 4 am, the Germans began to liquidate the Warsaw Ghetto, closed down the remnants of the Jews with a police cordon, went inside tanks and armored cars and carried out their destructive work. We know that you help the martyred Jews as much as you can, I thank you, my countrymen, on my own and the government's behalf, I am asking you to help them in my own name and in the government, I am asking you for help and for extermination of this horrible cruelty.

— Supreme Commander of the Polish Armed Forces in the West and Prime Minister of the Polish government-in-exile gen. Władysław Sikorski – The content of the leaflet published in May 1943 in a circulation of 25,000 by Council for Aid to Jews calling for help for Jews.

During the uprising, units from the Polish Home Army and the communist Gwardia Ludowa attacked German units near the ghetto walls and attempted to smuggle weapons, ammunition, supplies, and instructions into the ghetto. The command of the Home Army ordered its sabotage units, Kedyw, to carry a series of actions around the walls against the German units under the codename Ghetto Action. A failed attempt to breach the ghetto walls on 19 April has been described as "one of the first large-scale battles carried out by the Home Army's Warsaw division." Between 19 and 23 April 1943, the Polish resistance engaged the Germans at six different locations outside the ghetto walls, shooting at German sentries and positions and in one case attempting to blow up a gate. Overall, the Home Army conduced seven total operations in support of the uprising. Following two unsuccessful attempts to breach the wall, the other operations focused on harassing Germans and their auxiliaries, inflicting a number of casualties. A National Security Corps unit commanded by Henryk Iwański ("Bystry") reportedly fought inside the ghetto along with ŻZW and subsequently both groups retreated together (including 34 Jewish fighters) to the Aryan side; however later research cast doubts on the veracity of Iwański's claims. Several ŻOB commanders and fighters also later escaped through the tunnels with assistance from the Poles and joined the Polish Home Army).

From April 24, daily patrols against Germans near the ghetto, aimed at eliminating the Germans and training our own (Home Army) branches- up to now without own losses. Some Germans were eliminated every day.

— Report for the month of April 1943 of the Kedyw, Warsaw District of the Home Army

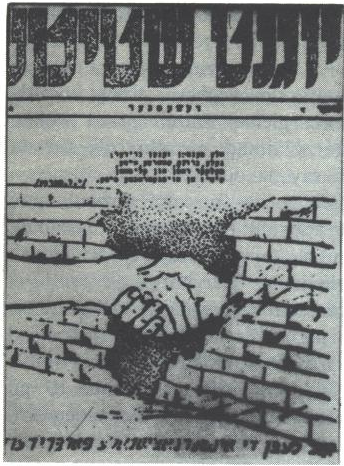
Poster printed by ŻOB: "All people are equal brothers; Brown, White, Black and Yellow. To separate peoples, colors, races, Is but an act of cheating!"

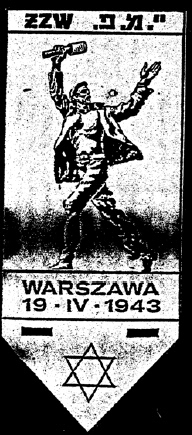
Commemorative pennant of ŻZW – Jewish Military Union.

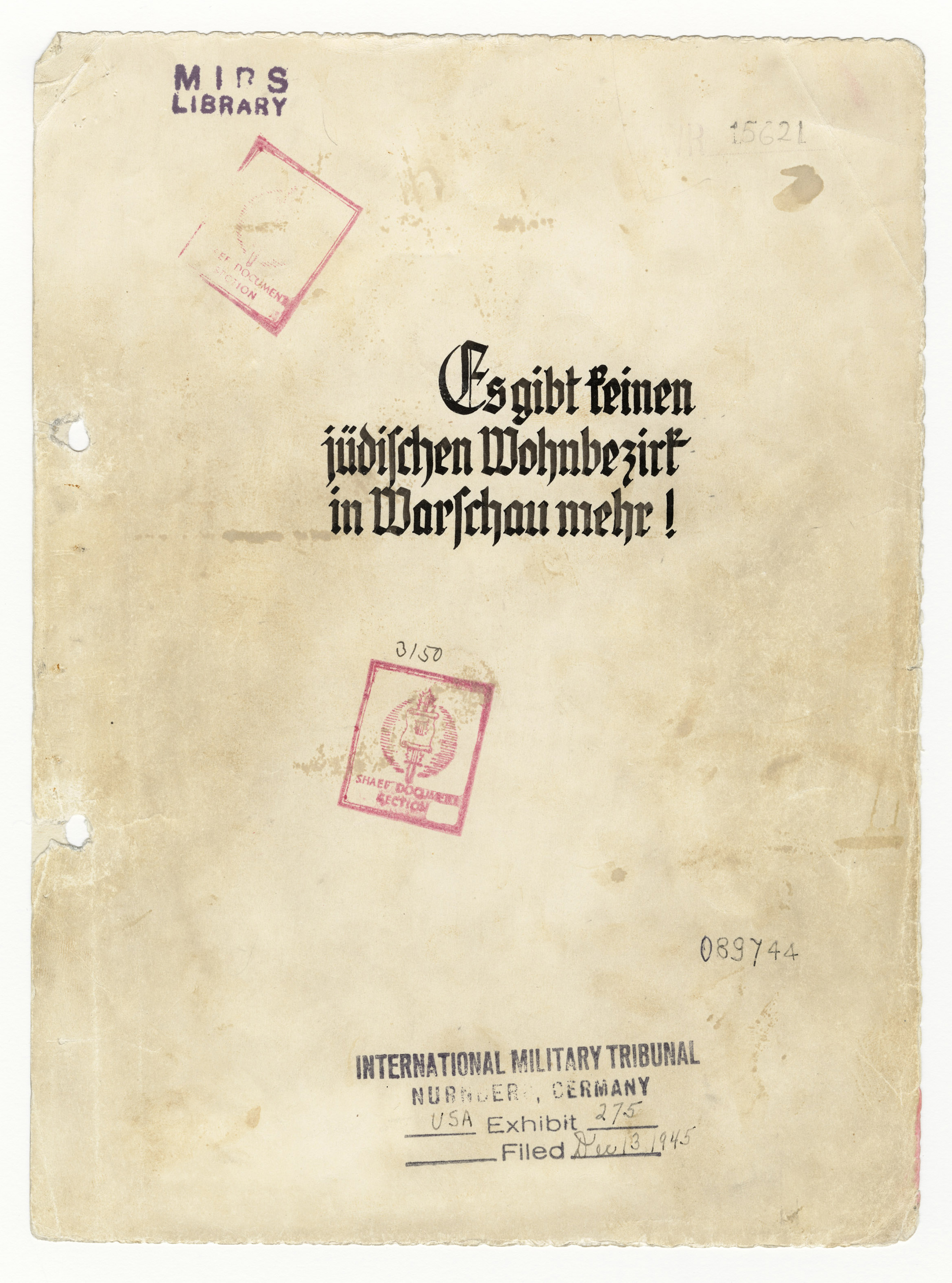
The cover page of The Stroop Report with International Military Tribunal in Nuremberg markings.

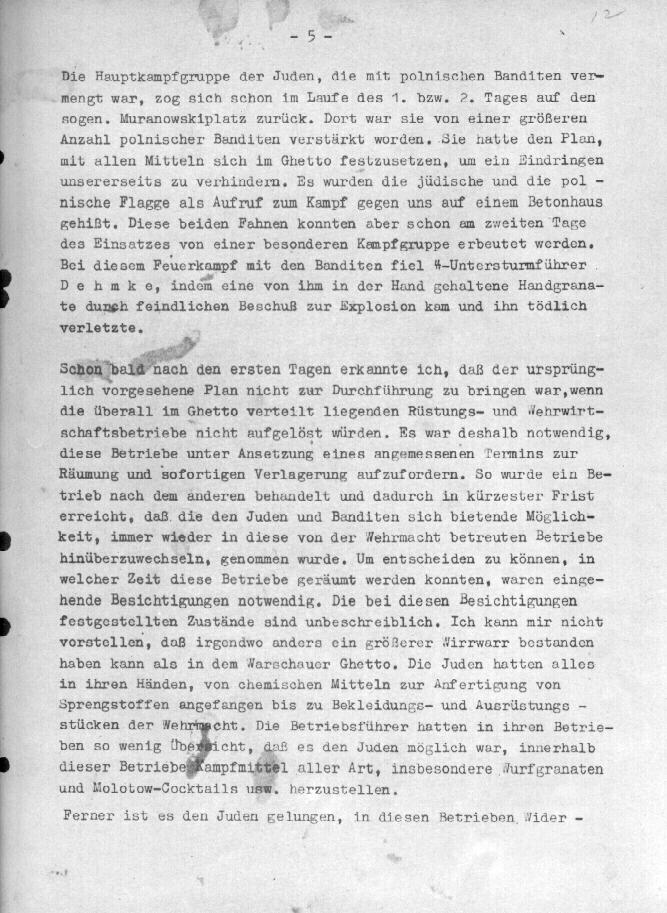
Page 5 of Stroop Report describing German fight against "Juden mit polnischen Banditen" – "Jews with Polish bandits".

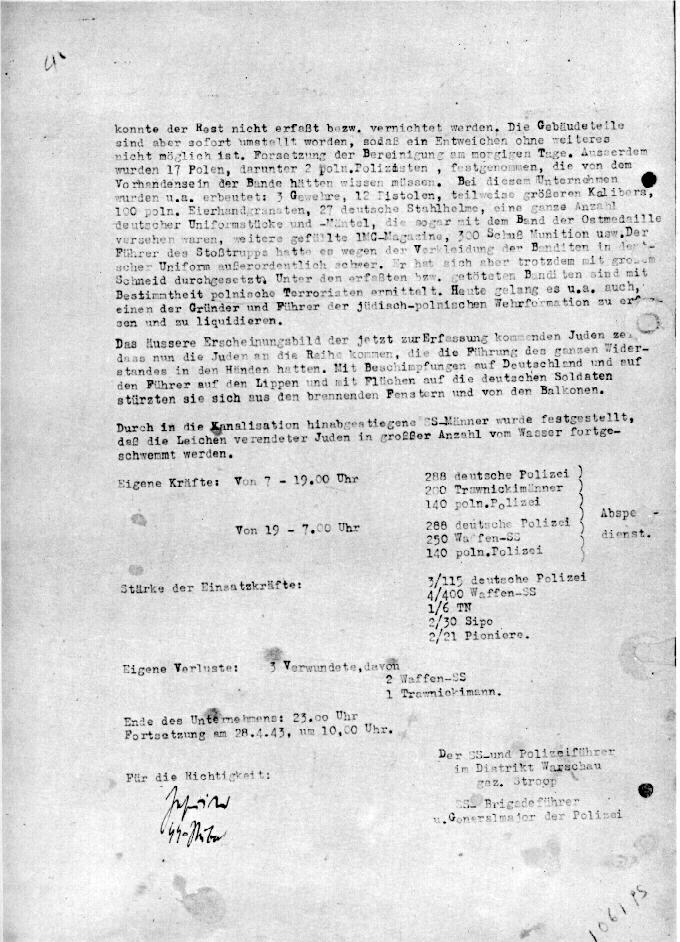
Continuation 27 April 1943 describing fight against "jüdisch-polnische Wehrformation" ("Jewish-Polish armed formation").

The failure to break through German defenses limited supplies to the ghetto, which was otherwise cut off from the outside world by a German-ordered blockade. Records confirm that the leftist ŻOB received less weaponry and support from the Polish Home Army, unlike the ŻZW with whom the Home Army had close ties and ideological similarities. Some survivors criticized gentile Poles for not providing sufficient support; for example in her book On Both Sides of the Wall, Vladka Meed, who was a member of the ŻOB, devoted a chapter to the insufficient support from the Polish resistance. The Home Army faced a number of dilemmas which resulted in it providing only a limited assistance to the Jewish resistance; these include the fact that it had very limited supplies and was unable to arm its own troops; the view (shared by most of the Jewish resistance) that any wide-scale uprising in 1943 would be premature and futile; and the difficulty to coordinate with the internally divided Jewish resistance, coupled with the pro-Soviet attitude of the ŻOB.

=== German ===
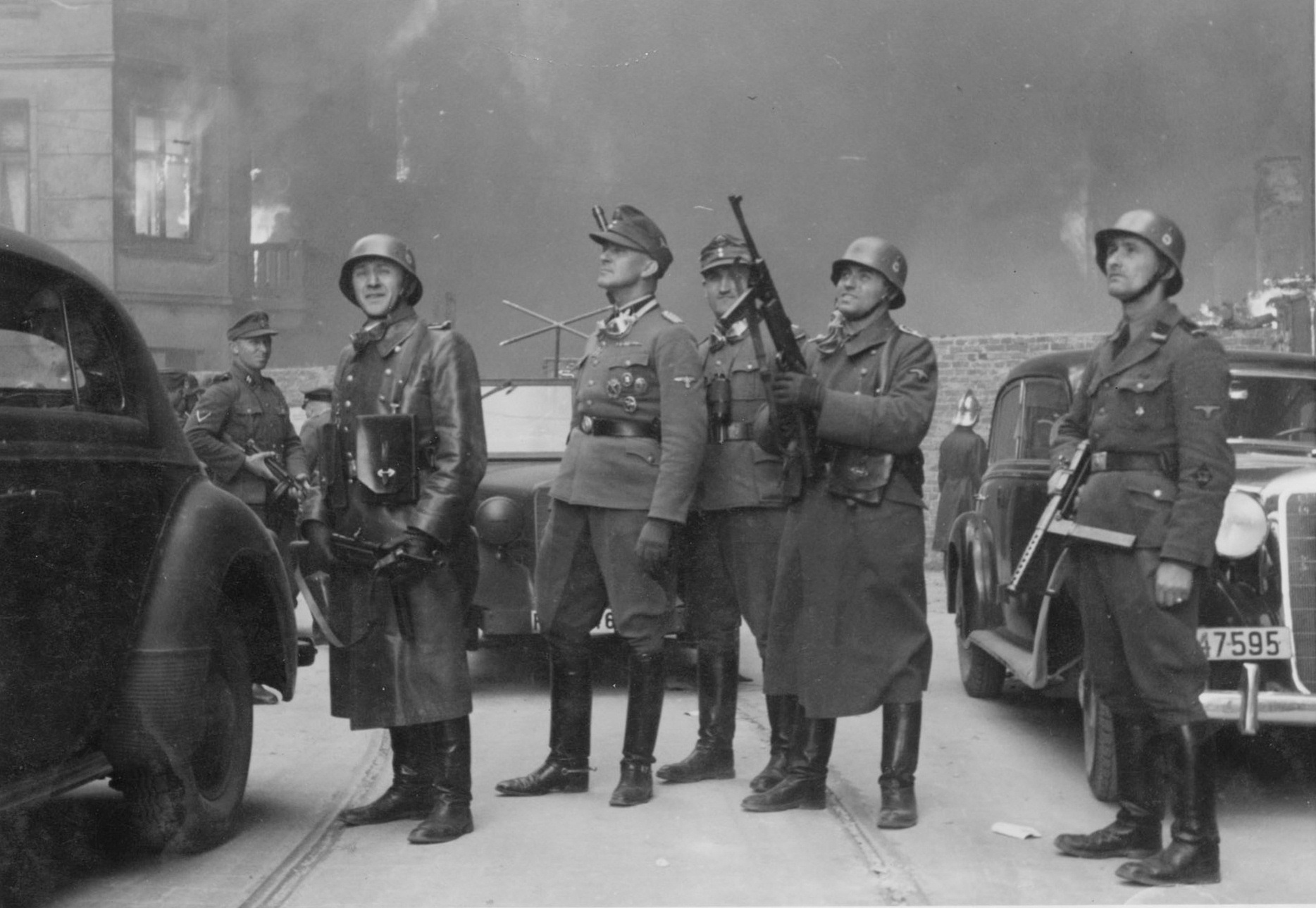
SS-Brigadeführer Jürgen Stroop (center). 2nd from right is Heinrich Klaustermeyer. The SD-Rottenführer at right is Josef Blösche at Nowolipie 64 / Smocza 1 intersection

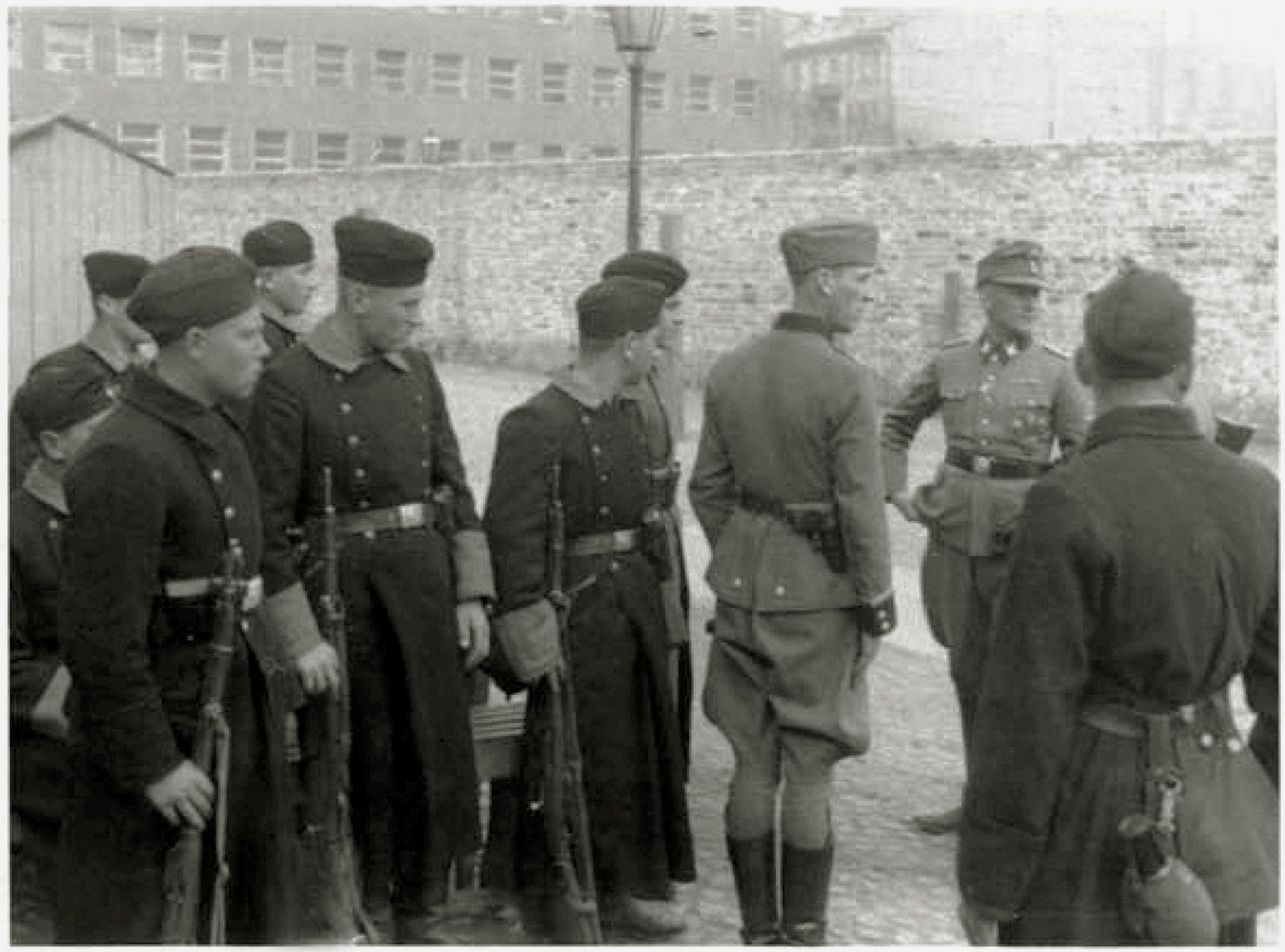
IPN copy #42"Askaris assigned to the operation"Stroop and foreign fighters at the Umschlagplatz, with Stawki 5/7 in the back.

Ultimately, the efforts of the Jewish resistance fighters proved insufficient against the German forces. According to Hanna Krall, the German task force dispatched to put down the revolt and complete the deportation action numbered 2,090 men armed with a number of minethrowers and other light and medium artillery pieces, several armored vehicles, and more than 200 machine and submachine guns. Its backbone consisted of 821 Waffen-SS soldiers and 9 officers from five SS Panzergrenadier reserve and training battalions and one SS cavalry reserve and training battalion. Other forces included 228 gendarmes and 6 officers of the Ordnungspolizei (Orpo) order police (battalions from the 22nd and 23rd regiments), 335 Trawniki men led by 2 officers, 56 Wehrmacht soldiers and 3 officers comprising a battery of anti-aircraft artillery and two detachments of railroad combat engineers, Warsaw personnel of the Gestapo and the Sicherheitsdienst (SD) intelligence service, and technical emergency corps.

Several Gestapo jailers from the nearby Pawiak Prison, led by Franz Bürkl, volunteered to join the "hunt" for the Jews. A force of 363 officers from the Polish Police of the General Government (so-called Blue Police) was ordered by the Germans to cordon the walls of the ghetto. Warsaw fire department personnel were also forced to help in the operation. Jewish policemen were used in the first phase of the ghetto's liquidation and subsequently summarily executed by the Gestapo.

Stroop later remarked:

I had two battalions of Waffen-SS, one hundred army men, units of Order Police, and seventy-five to a hundred Security Police people. The Security Police had been active in the Warsaw Ghetto for some time, and during this program it was their function to accompany SS units in groups of six or eight, as guides and experts in ghetto matters.

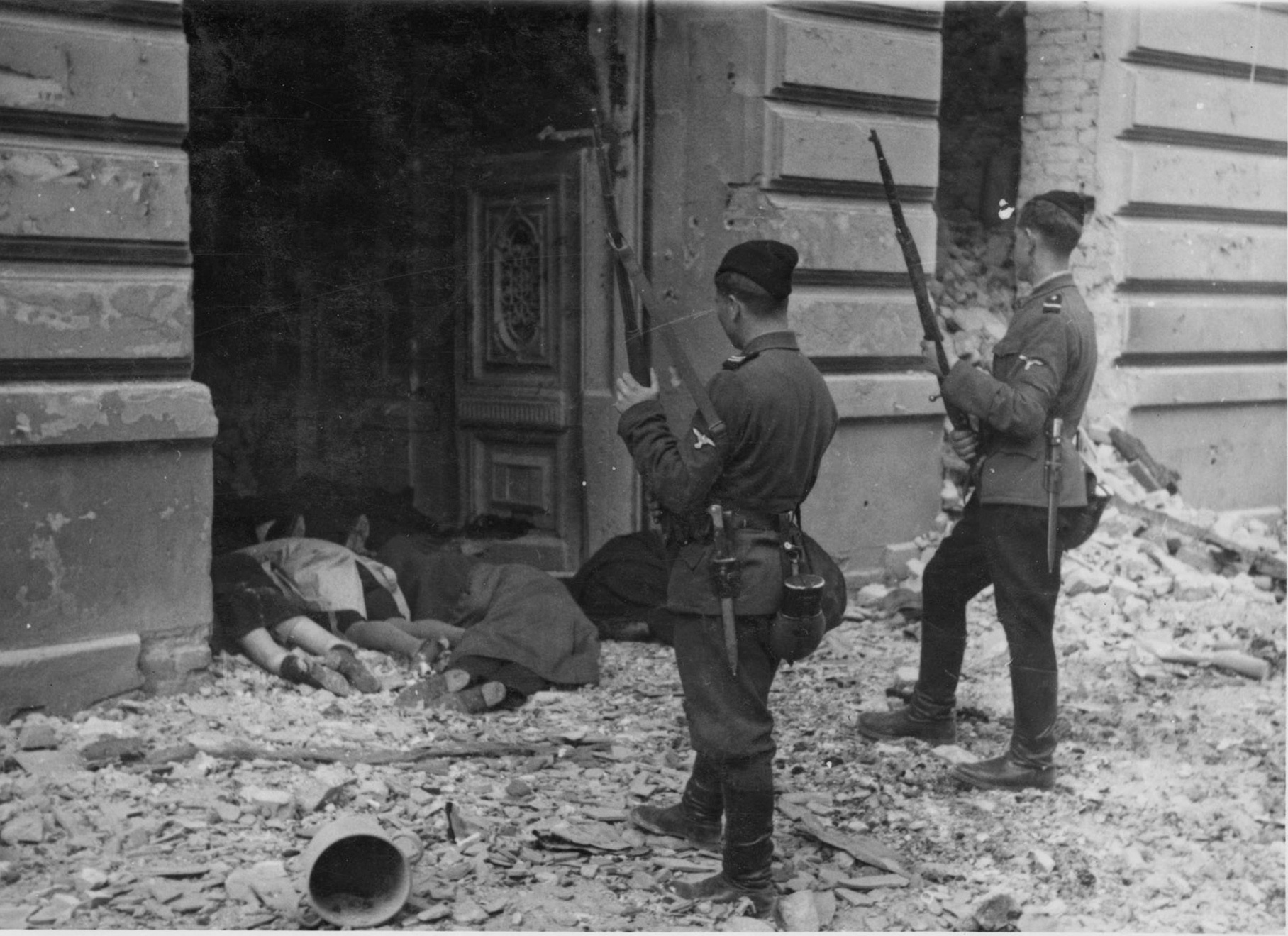
Trawniki men peer into a doorway past the bodies of Jews killed during the suppression of the uprising at Zamenhofa 42 / Kupiecka 18.

By his own words, Stroop reported that after he took command on 19 April 1943, the forces at his disposal totaled 31 officers and 1,262 men:

Units at Stroop's Disposal	Personnel
SS-Panzer Gren. Res. Batl:	6/400
SS-Cav. Res. Batl:	10/450
Police:	6/165
Security Service:	2/48
Trawniki-men:	1/150
Wehrmacht:	
1 10-cm Howitzer:	1/7
Flame thrower:	/1
Engineers:	2/16
Medical detachments:	1/1
3 2.28-cm A.A.guns:	2/24
1 French tank of the Waffen-SS:	
2 Heavy armored cars of the Waffen-SS:	
Total:	31/1262

Stroop's report listed ultimate forces at his disposal as 36 officers and 2,054 men:

Staff of the SS- and Police Leader:	6/5
Waffen-SS:	
SS Panzer Grenadier Training Battalion III Warschau:	4/440
SS Cavalry Training Battalion Warschau:	5/381
Orpo:	
SS Police Regiment 22 1st Battalion:	3/94
SS Police Regiment 23 3rd Battalion:	3/134
Technical personnel:	1/6
Polish Police:	4/363
Polish fire fighters:	/166
SD:	3/32
Wehrmacht:	
Light Flak Artillery Alarm Battery 3/8 Warschau:	2/22
Armored Train Combat Engineer Battalion Rembertow:	2/42
Railroad Combat Engineer Battalion 14 Gora-Kalwaria:	1/34
The foreign races (Fremdvölkische) guard troops:	
Trawnikis, 1st Battalion:	2/335

His casualty lists also include members of four other Waffen-SS training and reserve units (1st SS Panzer Grenadier; 2nd SS Panzer Grenadier; 4th SS Panzer Grenadier; 5th SS Panzer Grenadier Training Battalions). Polish police came from the Kommissariarts 1st, 7th and 8th.

== In popular culture ==
The uprising is the subject of numerous works, in multiple media, such as Aleksander Ford's film Border Street (1948), John Hersey's novel The Wall (1950), Leon Uris' novel Mila 18 (1961), Jack P. Eisner's autobiography The Survivor (1980), Andrzej Wajda's films A Generation (1955), Samson (1961), Holy Week (1995), and Jon Avnet's film Uprising (2001). The uprising also provided the inspiration for Arnold Schoenberg's composition A Survivor from Warsaw (1947).

The photograph of a boy surrendering outside a bunker, with Trawniki men with submachine guns in the background, became one of the best-known photographs of World War II and the Holocaust: (Note: "One of the most compelling and enduring images of the Holocaust"; "The Holocaust produced scores of searing images. But none had the evidentiary impact of the boy’s surrender."; "The boy in question can be seen in one of the most famous images of the Holocaust.") He is said to represent all 6 million Jewish Holocaust victims. (Note: "The child, whose identity has never been confirmed, has come to represent the face of the 6 million defenseless Jews killed by the Nazis."; "A Picture Worth Six Million Names")

== See also ==
- Destruction of Warsaw
- Sobibor uprising
- Białystok Ghetto uprising
- Ghetto uprisings
- Battle of Muranów Square

== Bibliography ==
=== Primary sources ===
- Moczarski, Kazimierz (1984). Conversations with an Executioner. Englewood Cliffs, N.J.: Prentice Hall. ISBN 978-0-300-09546-3. Original in Polish: PDF 1.86 MB.

=== In other languages ===
- Stroop, Jürgen (22 April 1943). Es gibt keinen jüdischen Wohnbezirk – in Warschau mehr! [There is no Jewish residential district – in Warsaw anymore!] (PDF) (Report) (in German). Archived from the original (PDF) on 2 December 2013.
- Stroop, Jürgen (2009) [22 April 1943]. Żydowska Dzielnica Mieszkaniowa W Warszawie Już Nie Istnieje! [The Jewish Residential District in Warsaw Does Not Exist Now!] (PDF) (in Polish and German). Warsaw: Institute of National Remembrance Commission for the Prosecution of Crimes against the Polish Nation. pp. 109–. ISBN 978-83-7629-455-1. – German: Es gibt keinen jüdischen Wohnbezirk – in Warschau mehr!
- Strzembosz, Tomasz (1983). Akcje zbrojne podziemnej Warszawy 1939–1944 [Armed actions of underground Warsaw 1939–1944] (in Polish). Warszawa: Państwowy Instytut Wydawniczy. ISBN 83-060-0717-4.
- Witkowski, Henryk (1984). Kedyw okręgu warszawskiego Armii Krajowej w latach 1943–1944 [Kedyw of Warsaw district of the Home Army in the years 1943–1944] (in Polish). Warszawa: Instytut Wydawniczy Związków Zawodowych. ISBN 83-202-0217-5.
- Wroński, Stanisław (1971). Polacy i Żydzi 1939–1945 (in Polish). Warsaw: Książka i Wiedza.

=== Further reading ===
- Arens, Moshe (2011). Flags Over the Warsaw Ghetto. Jerusalem: Gefen Publishing House. ISBN 978-965-229-527-9.
- Edelman, Marek (1990). The Ghetto Fights: Warsaw, 1941–43. London: Bookmarks Publications. ISBN 0-906224-56-X. Full text in external links, below.
- Gebhardt-Herzberg, Sabine (2003). "Das Lied ist geschrieben mit Blut und nicht mit Blei": Mordechaj Anielewicz und der Aufstand im Warschauer Ghetto (in German). Bielefeld: S. Gebhardt-Herzberg. ISBN 3-00-013643-6.
- Goldstein, Bernard (2005). Five Years in the Warsaw Ghetto. Oakland: AK Press. p. 256. ISBN 1-904859-05-4.
- Jahns, Joachim (2009). Der Warschauer Ghettokönig (in German). Leipzig: Dingsda-Verlag. ISBN 978-3-928498-99-9.
- Meckl, Markus (2008). "The Memory of the Warsaw Ghetto Uprising". The European Legacy. 13 (7): 815–824. doi:10.1080/10848770802503790. ISSN 1084-8770. S2CID 145567063.
- Paulsson, Gunnar S. (2002). Secret City: The Hidden Jews of Warsaw, 1940–1945. New Haven: Yale University Press. ISBN 0-13-171918-1. Review
