= Sabotage in World War II =

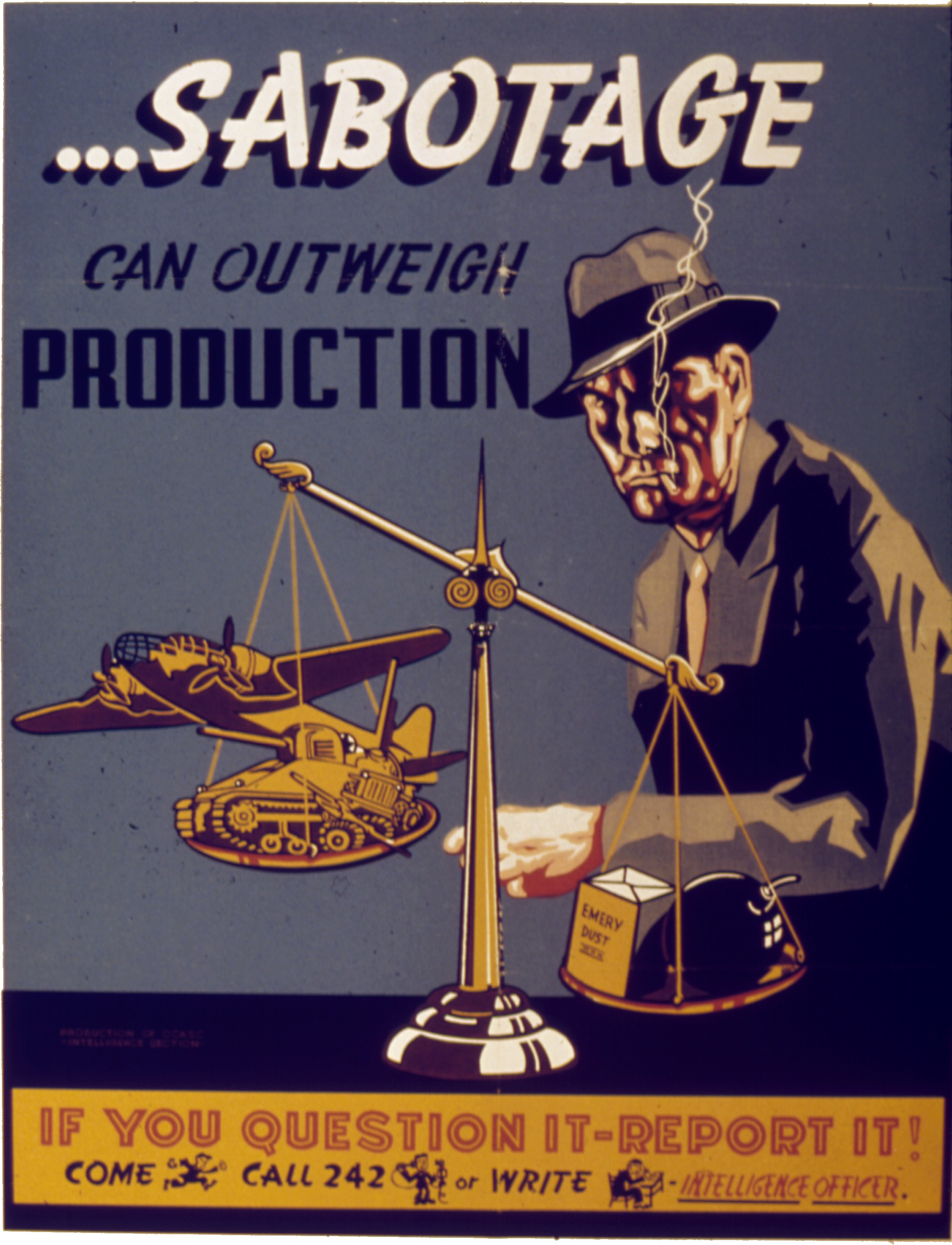
United States World War II-era poster warning against sabotage

Sabotage in World War II refers to a wide range of covert and irregular operations undertaken by resistance movements, intelligence agencies, and military special forces between 1939 and 1945. Sabotage targeted infrastructure, industry, transport, and communication systems in Axis- and Allied-controlled territories, and was a major element of irregular warfare during the conflict.

Both the Axis and Allied powers created sabotage networks: Germany through the Abwehr and Sicherheitsdienst (SD), Britain through the Special Operations Executive (SOE) and USA through the Office of Strategic Services (OSS). Sabotage was also used by resistance groups and even ostentibly neutral powers pursuing their own political aims, notably the Irish Republican Army (IRA).

Notable operations in the Western European theatre included the Norwegian heavy water sabotage (impacting Nazi nuclear research), Operation Harling in Greece (demolition of a major viaduct) and widespread railway sabotage in France and Belgium ahead of D-Day. In Eastern Europe, Polish resistance as well as Soviet partisans carried out extensive sabotage, from derailing German trains to crippling industrial output, disrupting supply routes and destroying infrastructure.

Sabotage in World War II demonstrated the effectiveness of irregular warfare and inspired postwar doctrines of special operations. The tactics developed by both Axis and Allied forces laid the foundations for modern special forces and insurgency strategies.

== Sabotage by Allied powers ==
=== Allied agencies and special forces ===
The British Special Operations Executive (SOE), founded in 1940, and the American Office of Strategic Services (OSS), created in 1942, were the principal Allied agencies tasked with coordinating sabotage and irregular warfare. Their responsibilities included espionage, subversion, propaganda, and direct support of partisan movements in Europe and Asia. In cooperation with local resistance groups, SOE and OSS operatives conducted raids, ambushes, and sabotage of transport and industrial facilities across occupied territories.

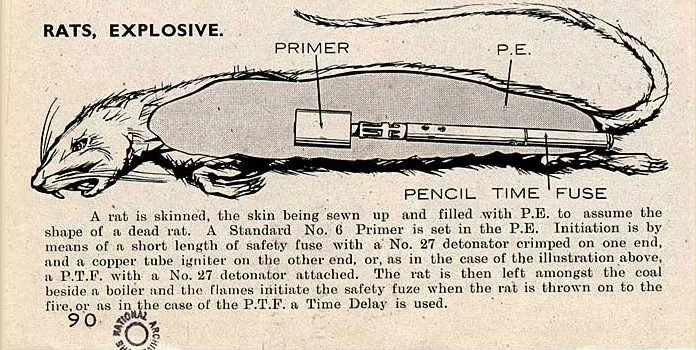
Diagram and instructions for creating explosive rats

Both agencies invested in the development of specialized munitions and devices for sabotage operations. These included plastic explosives (*PE*, or "plastique") and incendiary devices, some designed (ex. time pencil) along with improvised and manufactured booby traps designed to be concealed in everyday objects (perhaps one of the more unusual artifacts of that era was the explosive rat). Allied manuals emphasized concealment and technical precision in placing charges, for example burying explosives under railway tracks to amplify destructive effect while avoiding detection.

On the eve of the Allied landings in Normandy (D-Day), the Special Operations Executive (SOE) transmitted secret coded messages to French Resistance cells, urging them to make a "maximum effort" in carrying out sabotage operations. On and shortly after D-Day, in Operation Jedburgh, small three-man teams composed of British, American, and French personnel were parachuted into France. Operating in uniform, their mission was to coordinate resistance activities with Allied strategic objectives. These teams, alongside local resistance, targeted German railways, communication systems, and power networks in the Normandy region. The resulting disruption hindered German troop movements and delayed reinforcements, thereby contributing to the success of the Allied invasion.

Direct-action sabotage tactics by Allied special forces included ambushes, raids on depots, and attacks on supply convoys. Units such as the British Commandos, the Special Air Service (SAS), the Special Boat Section (SBS), the Long Range Desert Group (LRDG), Australian Independent Companies and similar specialized in such missions, often operating behind enemy lines with portable demolition charges and sabotage kits. Despite German counter-sabotage efforts, SOE- and OSS-backed operations imposed significant costs on the Axis by diverting troops, slowing supply lines, and undermining morale.

=== Belgium ===
One of the most notable acts of sabotage in Belgium was the attack on the twentieth convoy. On 19 April 1943, three young Belgian resisters (armed with just one pistol and wire cutters) stopped a deportation train carrying Jewish prisoners to Auschwitz by placing a red lantern on the track near the village of Boortmeerbeek. They managed to halt the train and pry open a boxcar, allowing over a hundred Jews to escape.

=== France ===
French Resistance long targeted railways, through direct sabotage as well as strikes and similar activities. French Resistance sabotage of electrical power supply caused more work disruption at certain industrial locations than Allied bombing campaigns.

=== Greece ===
One of the most notable examples of sabotage in wartime Greece was Operation Harling, the product of SOE cooperation with Greek resistance, which resulted in the demolition of the highly strategic Gorgopotamos viaduct.

=== Norway ===
One of the most significant sabotage campaigns of the war took place in occupied Norway, targeting the German nuclear program. The Norsk Hydro plant at Vemork was the only large-scale producer of heavy water, an essential moderator in nuclear fission research. After reports from Norwegian scientist Leif Tronstad and plant manager Jomar Brun alerted London to increased German demands, the facility was made a top Allied target.

The first major attempt, Operation Freshman (November 1942), involved British airborne troops transported by gliders. The mission failed when both gliders crashed in poor weather, leading to the death or capture of all participants. A subsequent mission, Operation Gunnerside (February 1943), was carried out by a team of Norwegian commandos trained by the Special Operations Executive. After skiing across the Hardangervidda plateau in winter conditions, the saboteurs infiltrated the Vemork facility and successfully destroyed the electrolytic cells used in heavy-water production. They then escaped without casualties, aided by local resistance networks.

The raid was followed by German efforts to repair the plant and continue shipments. In February 1944, Norwegian saboteurs and Allied aircraft intercepted the ferry Hydro on Lake Tinnsjø, sinking a cargo of heavy water bound for Germany. This effectively ended the Nazi atomic program's access to heavy water from Norway. Despite the initial failure, the Norwegian heavy-water sabotage operations are widely considered among the most successful acts of resistance in World War II.

=== Poland ===
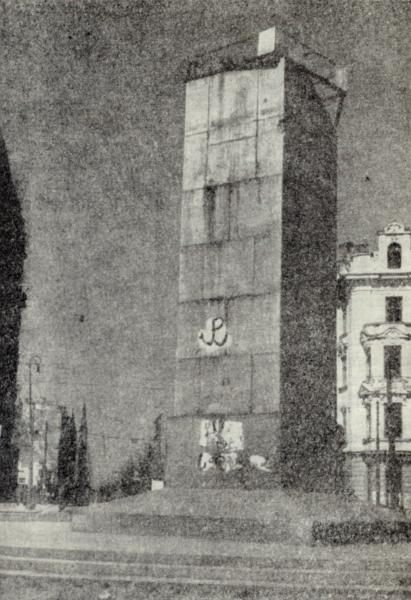
Polish resistance Kotwica graffiti painted by Szare Szeregi on the remains of the Aviator Monument at Warsaw's Union of Lublin Square

Following the successful German–Soviet invasions of September 1939, Poles continued organized resistance, most famously under the Home Army (Armia Krajowa, AK). Sabotage was a central part of its activity, intended both to undermine German military operations and to sustain the morale of the occupied population. Individual, nonviolent acts of sabotage, such as tearing down German propaganda posters, and putting anti-German graffiti, began early after occupation, in the fall of 1939, and became more organized over time (known in Poland as the "minor sabotage").

In April 1940, General Stefan Rowecki ordered the creation of the Związek Odwetu ("Union of Retaliation"), tasked with disrupting German economic and military security on Polish territory, lowering German morale, and maintaining patriotic spirit among Poles. After Germany's invasion of the Soviet Union in 1941, diversionary operations expanded, focusing on railway sabotage on routes supplying the Eastern Front. Early actions included the May 1942 destruction of a German troop train near Mińsk–Stołpce, the September 1942 demolition of a bridge on the Kamienna river at Ostrowiec, and the coordinated October 1942 Operation Wieniec which simultaneously cut multiple railway lines around Warsaw.

In January 1943 the AK's High Command created the Kierownictwo Dywersji (Kedyw, Directorate of Sabotage), merging Związek Odwetu and Wachlarz, with Colonel August Emil Fieldorf "Nil" as commander. Its first action came on New Year's Eve 1942/43, with some 60 sabotage operations across the Zamość region targeting railway, telecommunication, police, and German administrative infrastructure. Kedyw units later carried out Operation Taśma in 1943, attacking German border posts, and continued rail sabotage in 1944 during Operation Jula.

A special unit, Zagra-Lin, extended sabotage into the Reich itself. Between February and May 1943 it carried out bombings at several Berlin train stations and a major attack at Wrocław Central Station, as well as blowing up a supply train on the Bydgoszcz–Gdańsk line. These operations symbolized Poland's response to Germany's total war and demonstrated the reach of the underground movement.

According to postwar estimates, between January 1941 and June 1944 the ZWZ–AK carried out more than 25,000 sabotage actions. These included the destruction or disabling of 6,930 locomotives, 732 train derailments, over 4,000 German military vehicles, and 38 railway bridges, as well as widespread production sabotage in factories and armaments works.

=== Soviet Union ===
The Soviet partisan movement was among the largest and most organized resistance campaign of the Second World War. Emerging after the German invasion in June 1941, partisan units formed from Red Army stragglers, escaped prisoners, and local volunteers. By 1942 they had grown into powerful brigades coordinated by the Central Headquarters of the Partisan Movement in Moscow, integrated with Communist Party structures and Red Army strategy.

From the outset, Soviet partisans targeted German supply lines. Railroads became the primary objective, as poor Soviet road infrastructure meant the Wehrmacht relied heavily on trains for logistics. Ambushes, demolition of tracks, and mining of bridges forced German commands to divert front-line troops to rear-area security. In some sectors, German officers routinely complained that ambushes on supply columns and rail traffic stalled for days due to partisan demolition campaigns. On the eve of the Battle of Kursk in August 1943, coordinated partisan operations cut hundreds of rail lines in a single night, significantly delaying reinforcements and resupply to German front-line units.

Partisans also carried out sabotage against industrial and agricultural assets, disrupted German requisitions, and assassinated collaborators. In September 1943, a Minsk underground cell successfully assassinated Wilhelm Kube, the German commissioner for Belorussia, with a mine placed in his bed by partisan agent Elena Mazanik. Beyond sabotage, partisan detachments provided intelligence on German troop movements, postal codes, and command structures, supplying valuable reconnaissance to the Red Army.

By 1943–44, the movement had grown to an estimated 250,000 fighters, with partisan "zones" in forests and swamps of Belorussia, Ukraine, and Russia. Operations became increasingly coordinated with Soviet offensives. During Operation Bagration in summer 1944, partisan brigades were tasked with seizing bridges, silencing artillery, and blocking German retreats, directly aiding the Red Army's advance.

Historians remain divided on the overall effectiveness of the Soviet partisan war. German sources estimated 15,000–35,000 losses inflicted by partisans, while Soviet claims ran as high as one million enemy personnel killed, wounded, or captured. However, many clandestine acts of minor sabotage, difficult to directly translate into German losses, are considered influential. For example, rail sabotage in winter, resulting in the freezing of water pumps, or agricultural sabotage - as simple as farmers hiding food - was a major factor complicating German logistics.

=== Yugoslavia ===
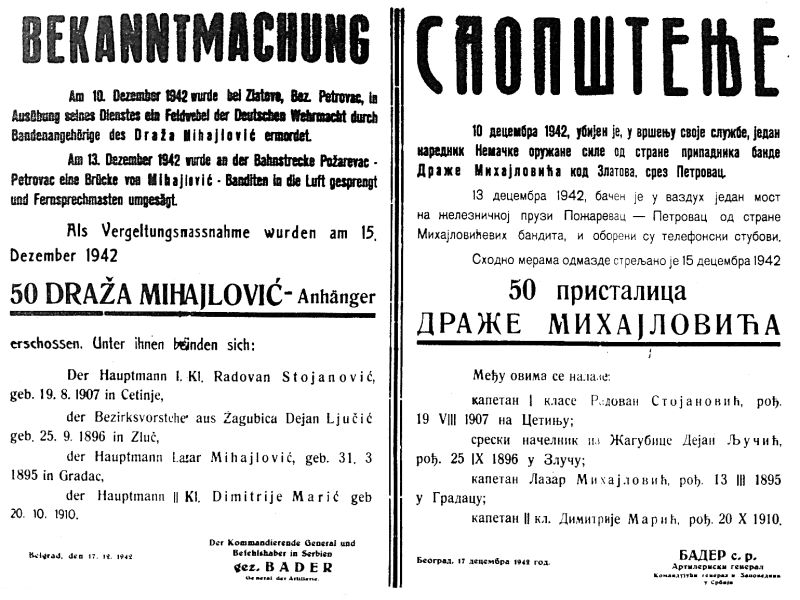
German poster about shooting 50 men of Draža Mihailović because of the destruction of railway bridge between Požarevac and Petrovac na Mlavi in December 1942

In German occupied Serbia and some nearby regions the Yugoslav Army in the Fatherland (commonly known as Chetniks) organized a campaign of sabotage of Axis communication lines mostly along the rivers Morava, Vardar and Danube, to obstruct transport of German war material through Serbia to Thessaloniki and further to Libya during Western Desert campaign. In the Independent State of Croatia (NDH), railroads were a frequent target of partisan attacks and an important part of partisan strategy from the very beginning of the war. By July 1942, out of 4000 km of railroad lines, 1700 km were either destroyed or made unsafe for use. Rijeka-Moravice line saw several hundred attacks in 1942 alone, in which 40 railwaymen were killed and more than 100 were injured. German army also had to use significant resources of their own to protect the strategically important Zagreb-Zemun line. The attacks and interruptions continued throughout the war, significantly impairing the transport and the economy of the Independent State of Croatia.

== Sabotage by Axis powers ==
German preparations for sabotage and diversionary activities in Poland began months before the outbreak of the Second World War. From February 1939, the Abwehr established Kampf- and Sabotageorganisation (combat and sabotage groups) and Fallschirmorganisationen (parachute units) on Polish territory. One of the largest German units was known as Organisation Ebbinghaus or Kampftruppe Ebbinghaus. Many such groups were composed largely of ethnic Germans from Poland and Czechoslovakia, carried out raids in civilian clothing, sometimes preceding the Wehrmacht's advance. These organizations were tasked with attacking Polish Army units, police, and civilians from the rear, as well as protecting industrial plants and transport nodes needed for the Wehrmacht's advance. By July 1939, the groups (also known as Freikorps) in Silesia alone numbered over 4,400 members, while in southeastern provinces, ranks of Organisation of Ukrainian Nationalists and affiliates which would engage in similar activities (see OUN Uprising of 1939) reached about 4,000 members.

German sabotage actions intensified in August 1939: bombs exploded in many Polish cities in late August (for example, in Cieszyn on the night of 23 to 24 August and in Poznań on the night of 25 to 26). Other incidents included bombings in Grudziądz, and Katowice, and railway sabotage near Nowy Sącz and Lwów. Many operations were conducted by agents of the Sicherheitsdienst (SD), who also staged false-flag attacks against German property in Poland to fabricate pretexts for war. The most notorious of these provocations was the bomb detonation at Tarnów railway station on 28 August which killed at least 14 people and injured dozens, and the Operation Himmler's Gleiwitz incident of 31 August 1939, staged by German forces under Alfred Naujocks, which provided Adolf Hitler with a propaganda justification for invading Poland.

Polish government reports from 1 September confirm that German "fifth column" groups opened fire on Polish troops in multiple towns, cut telephone lines, and attempted to seize strategic sites. The Abwehr later assessed that sabotage operations succeeded only partially, but that combat organizations of local German auxiliaries had achieved their objectives fully. Historians estimate that between 7,000 and 9,000 ethnic Germans in Poland were engaged in such activities, a small minority of the overall German population in the country.

Elsewhere, German sabotage activities targeted communications, transport, and fuel depots across Allied territory. Special units such as the Brandenburgers, originally formed under the Abwehr in 1939 from Ebbinghaus unit survivors, carried out infiltration and demolition missions, often disguised as enemy soldiers or civilians to create confusion behind the lines. During the invasions of Denmark and Norway in April 1940 (Operation Weserübung), Brandenburgers seized key bridges, ports, and communication centers, enabling rapid advances by conventional German forces. In the Western campaign of May 1940 they repeated these tactics in Belgium and the Netherlands, where small groups secured strategic bridges such as those at Gennep and Nieuport intact before Allied forces could demolish them. In the Balkans, Brandenburgers engaged in both infiltration operations and brutal anti-partisan warfare, targeting guerrilla communications and supply networks in Yugoslavia and Greece from 1941 onwards. The unit was also active in the Middle East and African front. With the launch of Operation Barbarossa in June 1941, Brandenburger units operated in Soviet uniform to penetrate enemy positions, cut telephone lines, and seize vital river crossings ahead of the main German advance. They also undertook missions in the Caucasus during the summer offensive of 1942 (Case Blue), attempting to capture oil facilities and sabotage Soviet fuel depots, although with mixed success. In 1943, when Italy defected from the Axis, Brandenburgers disguised in Italian uniforms were deployed to seize strategic points like the Mont Cenis tunnel in the Alps. Their activities sabotage, combined demolition and intelligence gathering with counterinsurgency measures, reflecting the increasingly hybrid role of the unit as the war progressed.

== Sabotage by neutral powers ==
At the outbreak of the Second World War, sabotage was also employed by groups pursuing their own political agendas; some of it continued throughout the war. For example, in January 1939, the Irish Republican Army (IRA) launched the S-Plan, a bombing and sabotage campaign in Britain that targeted civil, military, and economic infrastructure, particularly electricity pylons, cables, and transport facilities in cities such as London, Manchester, Birmingham, and Liverpool. The campaign resulted in 61 incidents in the first four months of 1939 and more than 150 throughout that year. Although largely suppressed by early 1940, it intersected with the broader wartime atmosphere of 1939–1940, influencing both British public opinion and the evolution of state security policy.

== Legacy ==
Sabotage in the Second World War demonstrated the effectiveness of irregular warfare and laid the groundwork for postwar doctrines of special operations. Both Allied and Axis experiences reinforced the utility of sabotage as a form of asymmetrical warfare, showing how small, highly trained units could infiltrate enemy positions, employ deception, and achieve disproportionate strategic results. Pioneering work on explosives, incendiaries, and covert devices not only affected the war effort but also influenced later Cold War clandestine operations, with many devices and tactics refined since by special forces, insurgent and guerrilla movements.

== See also ==
- Norwegian heavy water sabotage – Sabotage operations with the aim of halting the creation process of Nazi nuclear weapons
- Operation Himmler – 1939 false-flag operations by Germany against Poland
- Resistance during World War II – Irregular forces in World War II
- Special Operations Executive – British World War II espionage and sabotage organisation
