= Zofia Franio =

Polish physician, resistance officer and Holocaust rescuer

- Zofia Franio
- Born: 16 January 1899; Pskov, Russian Empire
- Died: 25 November 1978 (aged 79); Warsaw, Poland
- Resting place: Powązki Cemetery, Warsaw
- Citizenship: Polish
- Education: University of Warsaw
- Occupation: Physician
- Known for: Commanding the Women's Mining Patrols; rescuing Jews during the Holocaust
- Awards: Silver Cross of the Virtuti Militari; Cross of Valour; Gold Cross of Merit with Swords; Silver Cross of Merit (twice); Righteous Among the Nations
- Military career
- Allegiance: Poland
- Branch: Polish Army; Home Army
- Service years: 1919–1920; 1939–1945
- Rank: Major
- Commands: Women's Mining Patrols (KPM)
- Conflicts: Polish–Soviet War; World War II; Warsaw Uprising

Zofia Franio (16 January 1899 – 25 November 1978), known during the Second World War by the pseudonyms "Doktor", "Doktór" and "Pani Doktor", was a Polish physician, army major and resistance commander. She organized and commanded the Women's Mining Patrols (Kobiece Patrole Minerskie, KPM), a women's sabotage and sapper formation that served successively in the Union of Armed Struggle and the Home Army. She also provided medical care and shelter to Jews and worked with Żegota, the Polish Council to Aid Jews. Yad Vashem recognized her as Righteous Among the Nations in 1971.

Franio studied medicine in Russia and Warsaw and served in the Polish medical service during the Polish–Soviet War. Between the wars she practiced internal and infectious-disease medicine, worked in clinics for the poor and became an instructor and inspector in Przysposobienie Wojskowe Kobiet (Women's Military Training, PWK). During the German occupation she built the KPM around five-woman patrols. Its members manufactured and transported explosives, attacked railway communications and delivered weapons and other materiel to the Warsaw Ghetto. In the Warsaw Uprising she commanded a 16-woman sapper unit and also treated insurgents.

After the war Franio resumed medical practice but joined the anti-communist underground, directing communications and clandestine-press distribution for the Freedom and Independence Association (WiN). Arrested in November 1946, she was sentenced to 12 years' imprisonment and held until May 1956. She subsequently returned to public health and the Polish Red Cross, formally retiring in 1976. She died in Warsaw and was buried at Powązki Cemetery.

== Early life, education and medical career ==
Franio was born in Pskov on 16 January 1899, the youngest child of Michał Franio and Aniela Władysława Franio, née Iwanow. Her father practiced internal medicine. (Note: The alternative 4 January 1899 date is the Old Style equivalent of 16 January; the museum, IPN and Zastocka use 16 January.) She completed secondary school in Pskov in 1916. That year she also finished a nursing course and volunteered in a hospital treating wounded soldiers.

She began medical studies in Petrograd in 1916 and transferred to the medical faculty at Rostov-on-Don in late 1917. The upheavals of the Russian Revolution and Civil War interrupted her education. In 1918 she traveled to Poland and enrolled at the University of Warsaw's Faculty of Medicine. During the Polish–Soviet War she volunteered for the army's medical service in 1919–1920, working on sanitary trains and in field hospitals and commanding a sanitary station. She then returned to her studies and assisted at her father's hospital in Mienia. In July 1927 she received her medical doctorate (Doctoris Medicinae Universae) from the University of Warsaw.

From 1927 to 1932 Franio worked in Warsaw's Second Internal Medicine Clinic under Witold Orłowski. She spent the next three years in the observation ward of St. Stanislaus Infectious Diseases Hospital on Wolska Street. From 1935 until 1939 she worked at the Municipal Outpatient Clinic for the Poor in Wola and as a district school physician. She also worked in sports medicine and served on the Scientific Council for Physical Education from 1928 to 1935.

Franio joined the PWK while still a student in 1924. She led camps and courses in first aid, medical rescue and military preparedness, and in 1936 was appointed an inspector. After Poland's General National Service Act of 1938, she helped prepare the medical criteria for assessing women's fitness for auxiliary military service; the resulting instruction was approved for official use in May 1939. Her prewar work brought two awards of the Silver Cross of Merit: in 1931 for physical-education and military-training work, and in 1939 for social work.

== German occupation ==
=== September 1939 and entry into the underground ===
Franio left Warsaw on 5 September 1939 under orders for the central administration to evacuate and traveled through Trawniki to Lwów (present-day Lviv). There she chaired the commission that medically examined volunteers for a women's auxiliary-service battalion. As German forces approached, she also helped prepare incendiary bottles for anti-tank defense. After Lwów was handed over to Soviet forces and the battalion was demobilized, she remained for several weeks to care for ill colleagues. She returned to Warsaw on 7 November and resumed work at the Wola clinic.

In November she joined the Service for Poland's Victory, the predecessor of the Union of Armed Struggle and Home Army. Her apartment at 6 Fałata Street became an early contact point for General Michał Tokarzewski-Karaszewicz. Franciszek Niepokólczycki, "Teodor", swore her into the underground; she adopted the pseudonym "Doktor" and requested an operational rather than exclusively medical assignment.

=== Women's Mining Patrols ===
The first Women's Mining Patrol was formed in March 1940 within the Union of Retaliation (Związek Odwetu, ZO). Its five members were Franio, Antonina Mijal-Bartoszewska, "Tosia"; Kazimiera Olszewska, "Mira"; Janina Rudomino-Kochanowska, "Nina"; and Kazimiera Skoszkiewicz-Lubiańska, "Maria". Zbigniew Lewandowski, "Szyna", provided specialist sapper training, initially in Franio's apartment and at allotment gardens on Mokotów Field. The women subsequently trained additional five-person patrols, creating a cellular organization that expanded through 1943.

The KPM belonged to ZO until 1942; in November that year it was transferred to the Warsaw District's Kedyw, the Home Army's sabotage and diversion command. The museum and IPN put its strength at about 40 women at the transfer, while the scholarly study of the unit gives approximately 50 in 1943. (Note: The museum and IPN give about 40 women in November 1942; Marcinkiewicz-Kaczmarczyk about 50 in 1943; and Zastocka 55 soldiers and commanders in nine patrols. The 16-woman unit of August 1944 was only part of the KPM.)

The patrols' work extended well beyond laying mines. They tested and manufactured mines, detonators, grenades and incendiary devices; maintained clandestine stores; transported weapons and explosives; and supported the Home Army's Technical Research Bureau. A 1944 KPM report recorded 13 depots, nine workshops and eight distribution points. A district Kedyw report covering September 1943 to March 1944 described the unit as responsible for production, supply and transport for the entire district. It also recorded that, when stores were threatened in late December 1943, Franio personally directed women who moved 1,500 kilograms of explosives and incendiary materials by hand over three days.

Franio took part in the planning and execution of Operation Wieniec on the night of 7–8 October 1942, in which KPM patrols attacked railway lines around Warsaw. The IPN's account credits the operation with derailing two locomotives, two freight cars and one passenger car, blocking Warsaw's railway junction for several hours. During Operation Odwet kolejowy ("Railway Retaliation") on 16–17 November, she accompanied Olszewska's patrol near Łuków and participated in mining the Łuków–Dęblin line. These operations formed part of the Home Army's campaign against German railway transport to the Eastern Front.

From late 1942 through 1943, Olszewska directed KPM deliveries of weapons, ammunition, explosives and incendiaries to the Warsaw Ghetto. The transfer points were first at 4 Krakowskie Przedmieście and later at a shop at 6 Chopina Street. The deliveries formed part of the Home Army's assistance to the Jewish Combat Organization before the Warsaw Ghetto Uprising in April 1943.

=== Rescue of Jews and work with Żegota ===
Franio's medical and resistance work overlapped in her aid to Jews. The Warsaw Ghetto database places her in Żegota's medical-care unit for children taken out of the ghetto. She treated people in hiding, helped obtain false documents and personally sheltered or arranged shelter for several Jews.

Yad Vashem's file gives a detailed account of her assistance to Anna Aschkenasy, later Aschkenasy-Wirska. Before the war Aschkenasy had taught at a Vilnius sewing school administered by Władysława Muzolf. After the Germans established the Vilnius ghetto in 1941, Aschkenasy turned to her former employer for help. She was hidden by Władysława and her husband Stanisław, first in their home and then on a leased farm. They supplied false papers and, when the farm also became unsafe, gave her a letter of introduction to Franio. Aschkenasy reached Warsaw in September 1941.

Franio found housing for Aschkenasy and, after repeated moves prompted by the risk of denunciation, found her work in a hospital. Aschkenasy remained there until the Warsaw Uprising. She was subsequently deported with other civilians to Pruszków and later hid in Zakopane until the area was liberated in January 1945; after the war she settled in Britain.

Franio also helped Aschkenasy's cousin Edward Cudnowski. He escaped by jumping from a train transporting him to Auschwitz and reached Franio's apartment on Fałata Street. She supplied documents belonging to a deceased man and arranged his admission to St. Stanislaus Hospital, where he was treated for typhoid and typhus. When staff discovered that he was circumcised and informed the hospital director, Professor Görtner, Franio asked what he would have done "as a doctor and human being". The director did not denounce Cudnowski. After he recovered, Franio had Aschkenasy collect a suitcase of clothing and 1,000 złoty from Irena Wyrębowska for him. Cudnowski nevertheless did not survive the war; Yad Vashem's linked database entry records his fate as murdered. (Note: Yad Vashem identifies Cudnowski as Aschkenasy's cousin and records him as murdered. Polscy Sprawiedliwi mentions an unnamed brother who survived; the accounts do not identify the two men as the same person.)

The Polscy Sprawiedliwi account also describes Franio's assistance to Anna Weinstock-Janczura, who arrived from Lwów in November 1942. Franio sheltered her, obtained false papers and found her work as a domestic servant; Weinstock-Janczura later recalled the importance of Franio's encouragement as well as this practical help. The same account credits Franio with assisting the physician Eleonora Reicher and Reicher's nephew Piotr Karniol, and places her medical care for Jews in hiding and her work for children within Żegota's aid network.

== Warsaw Uprising ==
At the outbreak of the Warsaw Uprising on 1 August 1944, the KPM was reorganized. A 16-member Female Sapper Unit was created under Franio from the Mijal-Bartoszewska, Olszewska, Kinsler and Bredel patrols. Other KPM members received assignments to demolish bridges outside Warsaw or joined predominantly male units.

Franio's sappers manufactured mines, grenades and incendiary bottles, initially from clandestine stocks and later from explosives recovered from unexploded German projectiles and Goliath tracked mines. The work carried risks of accidental explosion and toxic exposure. Zastocka recalled that teams stopped work at the first symptoms of TNT poisoning and were replaced by another group. Members also supported assaults on the main post office and the Blue Police building on Krakowskie Przedmieście and helped cut and improve a passage across Aleje Jerozolimskie.

The unit also fought in attacks on the Church of the Holy Cross and Mirowska Hall. At Mirowska Hall its members held their positions for several hours during a heavy counterattack before receiving orders to withdraw.

On 20 August the unit took part in the capture of the PAST telephone-exchange building at 39 Zielna Street. Her sappers made two breaches for the assault groups: one at first-floor level in the outbuilding at 35 Zielna Street, on the southern side, and another at third-floor level in the building at 3 Próżna Street that adjoined PAST on the northern side.

Alongside her command duties, Franio served as a physician to insurgent units, first in Wola and then in Śródmieście. She was promoted to major on 23 September 1944. By Home Army Commander's Order No. 512 of 2 October, she was awarded the Silver Cross of the Virtuti Militari, cross number 13095. After the capitulation she left Warsaw with the civilian population rather than enter German captivity.

== Postwar underground, trial and imprisonment ==
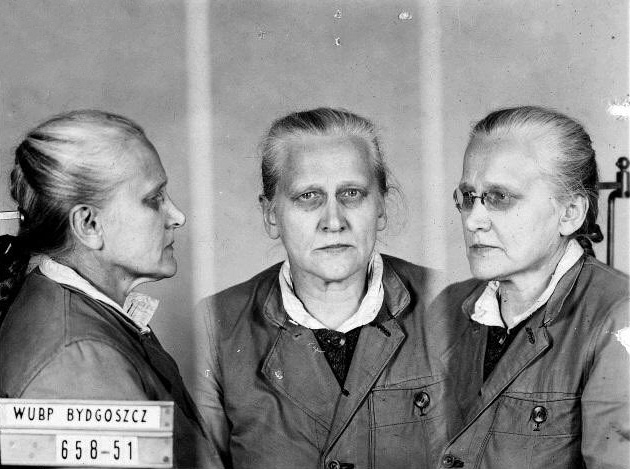
Ministry of Public Security photograph, 1946

Franio initially stayed in Malichy near Warsaw and returned to the city in late January 1945. Her apartment had been destroyed. She found medical work at the Holy Spirit Hospital in Konstancin and resumed her work for the Polish Red Cross.

In mid-1945 she resumed underground activity, directing communications in the Central Area Command of the Armed Forces Delegation for Poland (DSZ). She subsequently performed the same function in WiN. From January 1946 she headed communications and the clandestine distribution of underground publications in WiN's Central Area, personally distributing the illegal newspapers Polskie Słowo and Honor i Ojczyzna. For several weeks beginning in late October 1946 she also headed the Communications Department of WiN's III Main Board.

Officers of the Ministry of Public Security arrested Franio in Warsaw on 14 November 1946. Stanisław Rutkowski, a Jewish survivor and a colleague at the hospital where she worked, intervened with the prosecutors on her behalf, citing her wartime assistance to people persecuted by the Germans. The intervention did not prevent her conviction. On 31 July 1947 the Warsaw District Military Court sentenced her to 12 years' imprisonment for her WiN activity and deprived her of public rights for five years. (Note: The museum, IPN and Franio's personal file give 31 July 1947; Polish Wikipedia gives 31 August, citing Zawacka (2004), p. 182.)

Her imprisonment included stays in Warsaw, Fordon, Grudziądz and Inowrocław. She was released on 15 May 1956, after more than nine years in custody.

== Later life, recognition and death ==
Franio returned to Warsaw's public-health service in 1956. She first worked at a clinic on Wiejska Street and later as a physician at Medical Secondary School No. 4 on Rakowiecka Street and at a residence for girls attending vocational schools on Długa Street. She also continued her Polish Red Cross work. In April 1964 she received the organization's Third-Class Badge of Honour, and in 1971 a certificate recognizing 50 years of social and humanitarian work with young people. She formally retired in 1976, but Zastocka reports that she continued working part-time as a physician at the girls' boarding school.

On 26 December 1971 Yad Vashem recognized Franio, Stanisław Muzolf and Władysława Muzolf as Righteous Among the Nations. Franio's medal was presented at a ceremony in Warsaw on 18 April 1978. Polscy Sprawiedliwi says that Aschkenasy-Wirska submitted the nomination and that Weinstock-Janczura also sent testimony to Yad Vashem. (Note: Zastocka gives 1978 for the honor; Yad Vashem dates formal recognition to 26 December 1971, and Polscy Sprawiedliwi dates the medal ceremony to 18 April 1978.)

Franio continued hiking in the Tatra Mountains into her seventies. In August 1975, aged 76, she was injured while descending Świnica and was carried down by members of the Mountain Volunteer Search and Rescue service. She spent her last two years in serious illness and died in Warsaw on 25 November 1978. She was buried at Powązki Cemetery; the Warsaw Uprising Museum's grave register locates the grave in the Old Powązki section at 150-4-31.

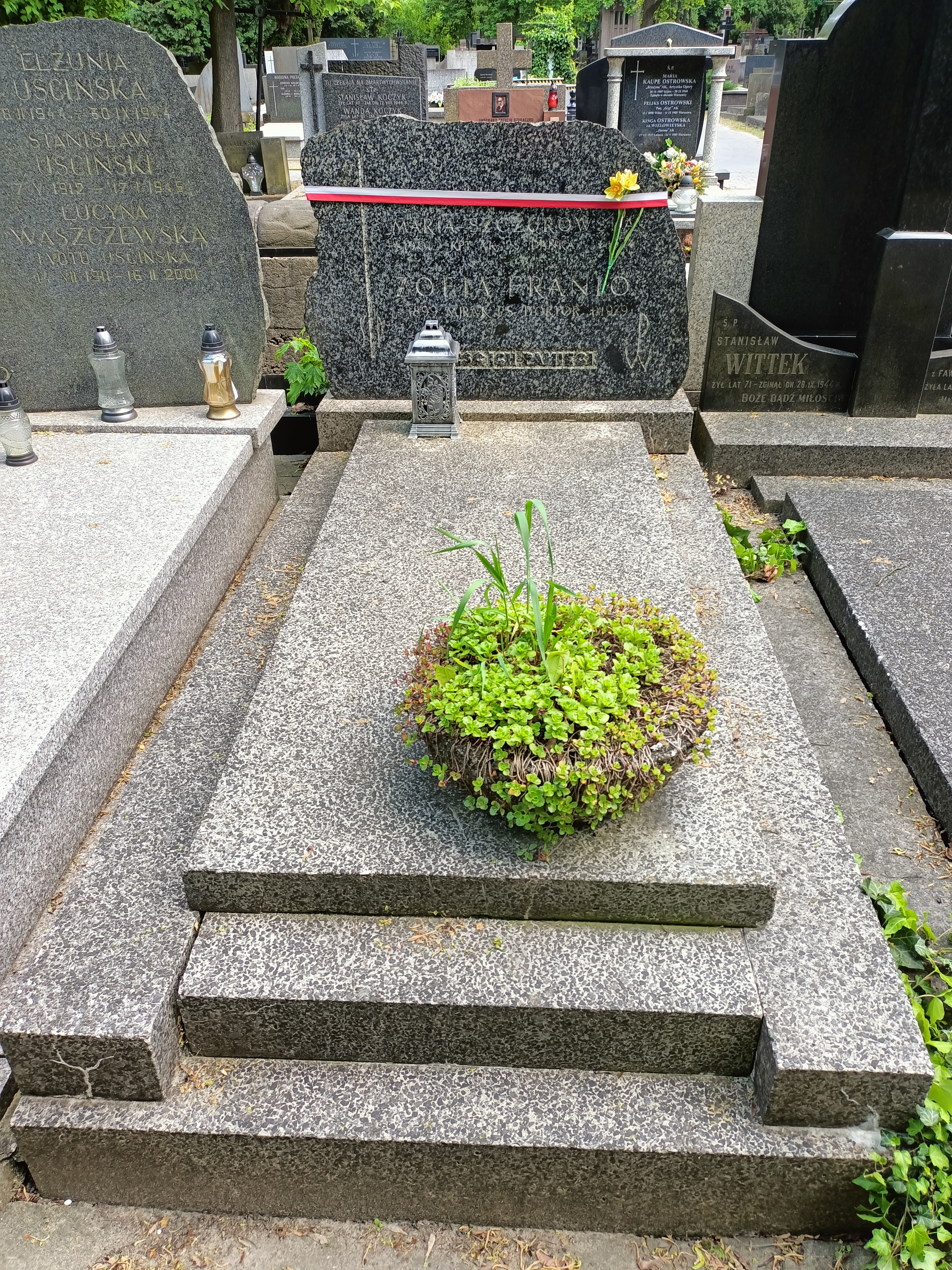
Franio's grave at Powązki Cemetery

== Decorations and honors ==
- Silver Cross of Merit, awarded in 1931 for physical-education and military-training work and again in 1939 for social work.
- Cross of Valour, 11 November 1942.
- Gold Cross of Merit with Swords, 3 May 1944.
- Silver Cross of Merit with Swords.
- Silver Cross of the Virtuti Militari, 2 October 1944, Order No. 512, cross No. 13095.
- Cross of the Home Army.
- Third-Class Badge of Honour of the Polish Red Cross, April 1964.
- Righteous Among the Nations, recognized 26 December 1971; medal presented 18 April 1978.

== Bibliography ==
- Marcinkiewicz-Kaczmarczyk, Anna (2015). "Żeńskie oddziały sabotażowo-dywersyjne w strukturach armii podziemnej w latach 1940–1944 na podstawie relacji i wspomnień ich członkiń" [Female sabotage troops in the underground army in 1940–1944, based on the relations and memories of their members]. Pamięć i Sprawiedliwość (in Polish). 26 (2): 115–138.
- Wysoczyńska, Katarzyna (2019). Zofia Franio. W służbie Ojczyźnie, w służbie człowiekowi [Zofia Franio: In the service of the homeland, in the service of humanity] (in Polish). Gdańsk: Fundacja Historia PL. ISBN 978-83-65678-36-2.
