= Battle of the rails =

Battle of the rails can refer to:

- Railway sabotage during World War II
- The Battle of the Rails, a 1946 French film
