= Ghetto Action =

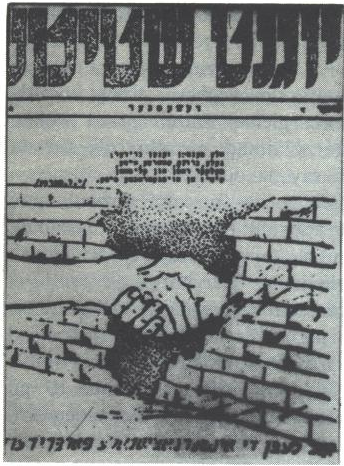
Poster printed by ŻOB: "All people are equal brothers; Brown, White, Black and Yellow. To separate peoples, colors, races, Is but an act of cheating!"

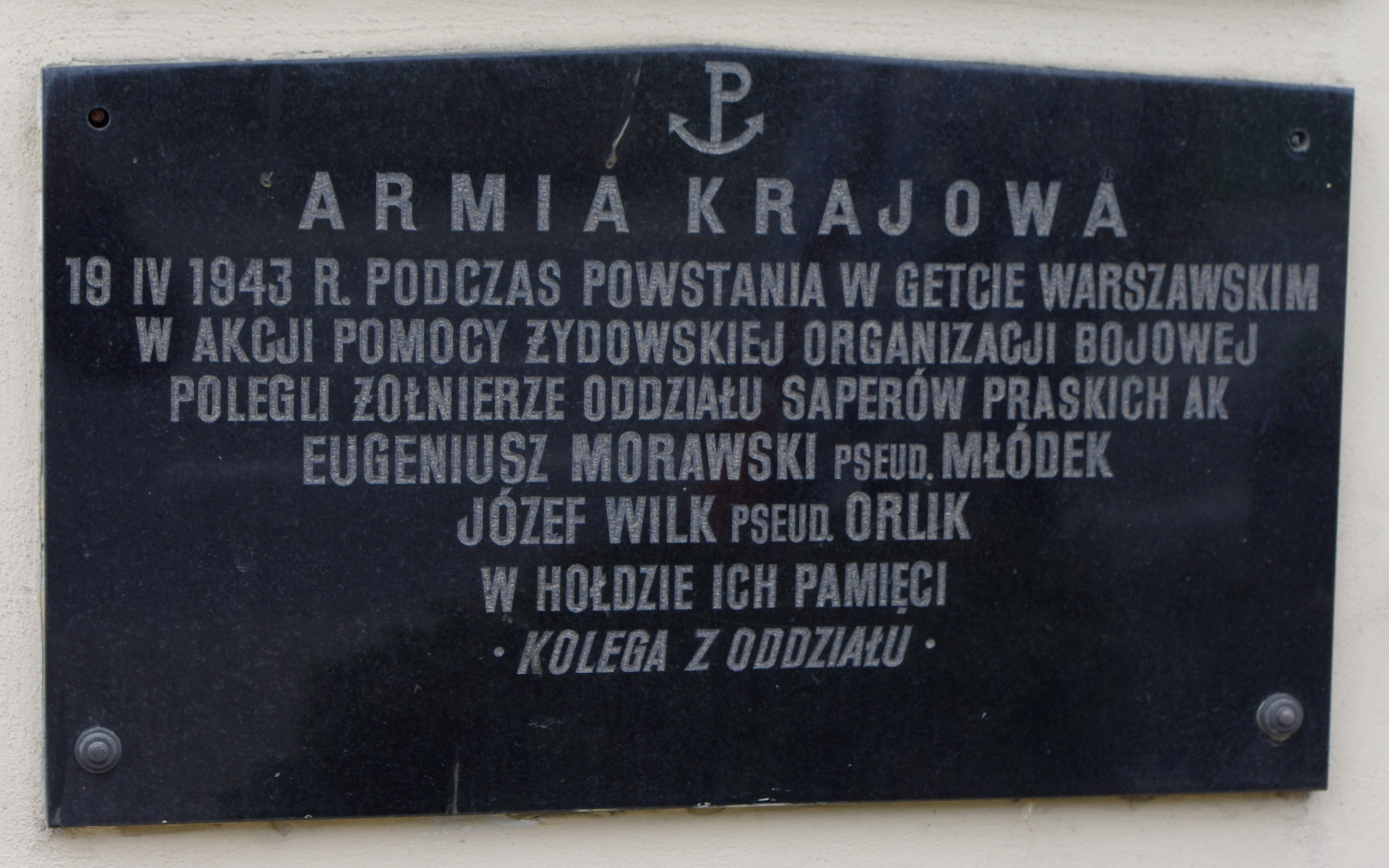
Plaque commemorating Home Army soldiers - Eugeniusz Morawski ps. "Młodek" and Józef Wilk ps. "Orlik" killed during the Ghetto Action on the wall Church of St. John of God at ul. Bonifraterska 12 in Warsaw.

Action Ghetto (pol. Akcja Getto) was the code name for the armed actions of the Polish Underground State during the Warsaw Ghetto Uprising aimed at helping the insurgents. The name was given to a series of combat actions carried out by the Home Army during the uprising between 19 April 1943 and May 16, 1943.

== Background ==
The right-wing faction Żydowski Związek Wojskowy (ŻZW) which was founded by former Polish officers, was larger, more established and had closer ties with the Polish resistance, making it better equipped. Zimmerman describes the arm supplies for the uprising as "limited but real". Specifically, Jewish fighters of the ŻZW received from the Polish Home Army: 2 heavy machine guns, 4 light machine guns, 21 submachine guns, 30 rifles, 50 pistols, and over 400 grenades for the uprising. During the Warsaw Ghetto Uprising, ŻZW is reported to have had about 400 well-armed fighters grouped in 11 units, with 4 units including fighters from the Polish Home Army. According to data collected by Władysław Bartoszewski, the Warsaw district of the AK donated ŻOB: 90 pistols with two magazines each and ammunition, 600 hand grenades (approximately 500 defensive and 100 offensive), 1 eraser, 1 submachine gun, and about 165 kg of explosives (mainly seamed production) and about 400 fuses for them (including own production) and plastic from English discharges.

Shortly before the uprising, Polish-Jewish historian Emanuel Ringelblum (who managed to escape from the Warsaw Ghetto, but was later discovered and executed in 1944) visited a ŻZW armoury hidden in the basement at 7 Muranowska Street. In his notes, which form part of Oneg Shabbat archives, he reported:

They were armed with revolvers stuck in their belts. Different kinds of weapons were hung in the large rooms: light machine guns, rifles, revolvers of different kinds, hand grenades, bags of ammunition, German uniforms, etc., all of which were utilized to the full in the April "action". (...) While I was there, a purchase of arms was made from a former Polish Army officer, amounting to a quarter of a million zlotys; a sum of 50,000 zlotys was paid on account. Two machine guns were bought at 40,000 zlotys each, and a large amount of hand grenades and bombs.

The support of the Home Army as regards the supply of weapons was confirmed by Marek Edelman from the leftist Żydowska Organizacja Bojowa ŻOB: "At the end of December 1942, we received our first transport of weapons from the Home Army, there were not many, only 10 pistols, but that made our first armed action impossible [. ..] At the end of January 1943, we received fifty larger pistols and fifty-five grenades from the Home Army Headquarters [...] In March 1943, each of our partisans had a pistol and 10-15 ammunition, 4-5 grenades and the same number of bottles. Two or three rifles were assigned to each section of the district, we only had one machine gun."

== Ghetto Action ==
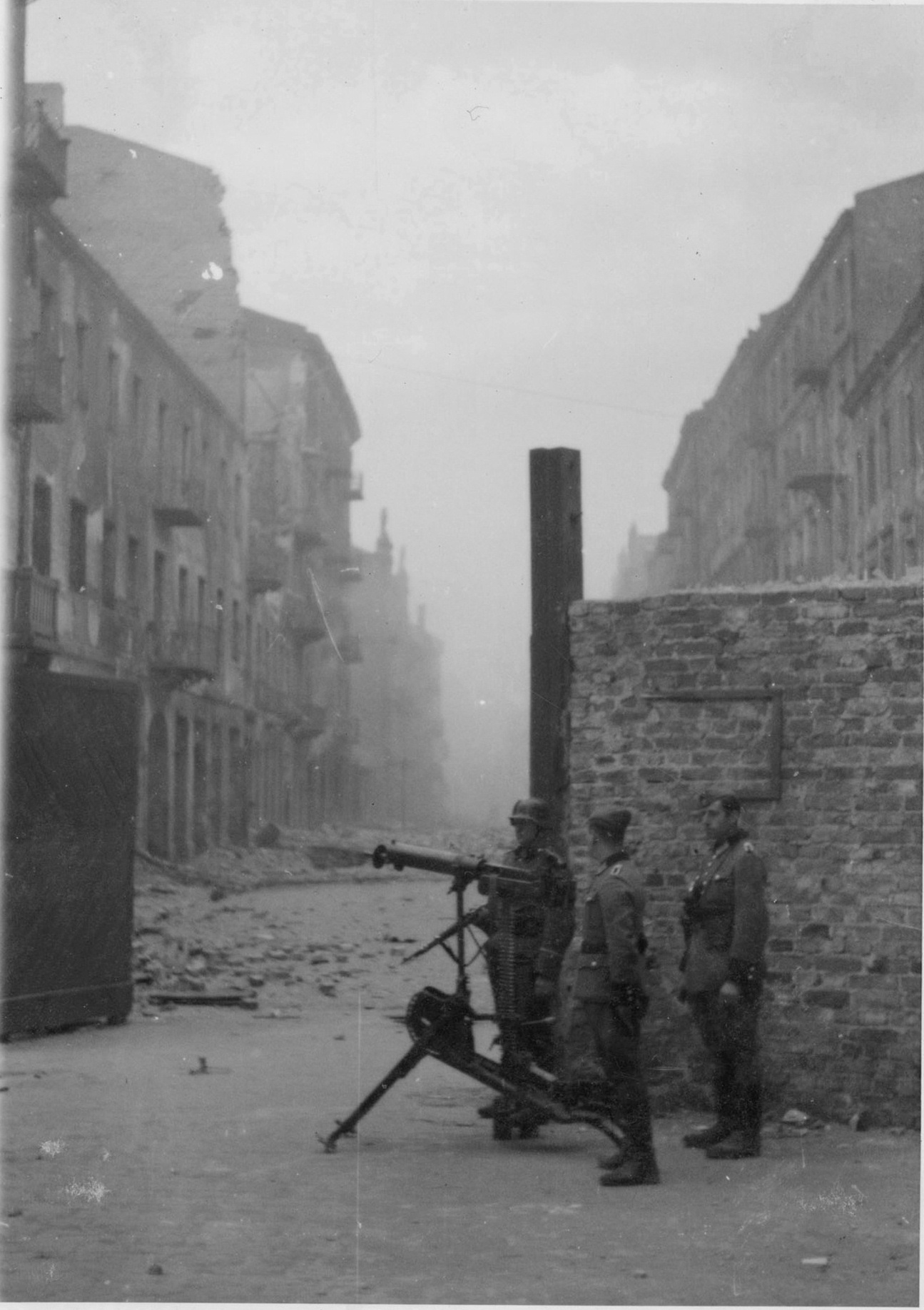
German post at the ghetto wall

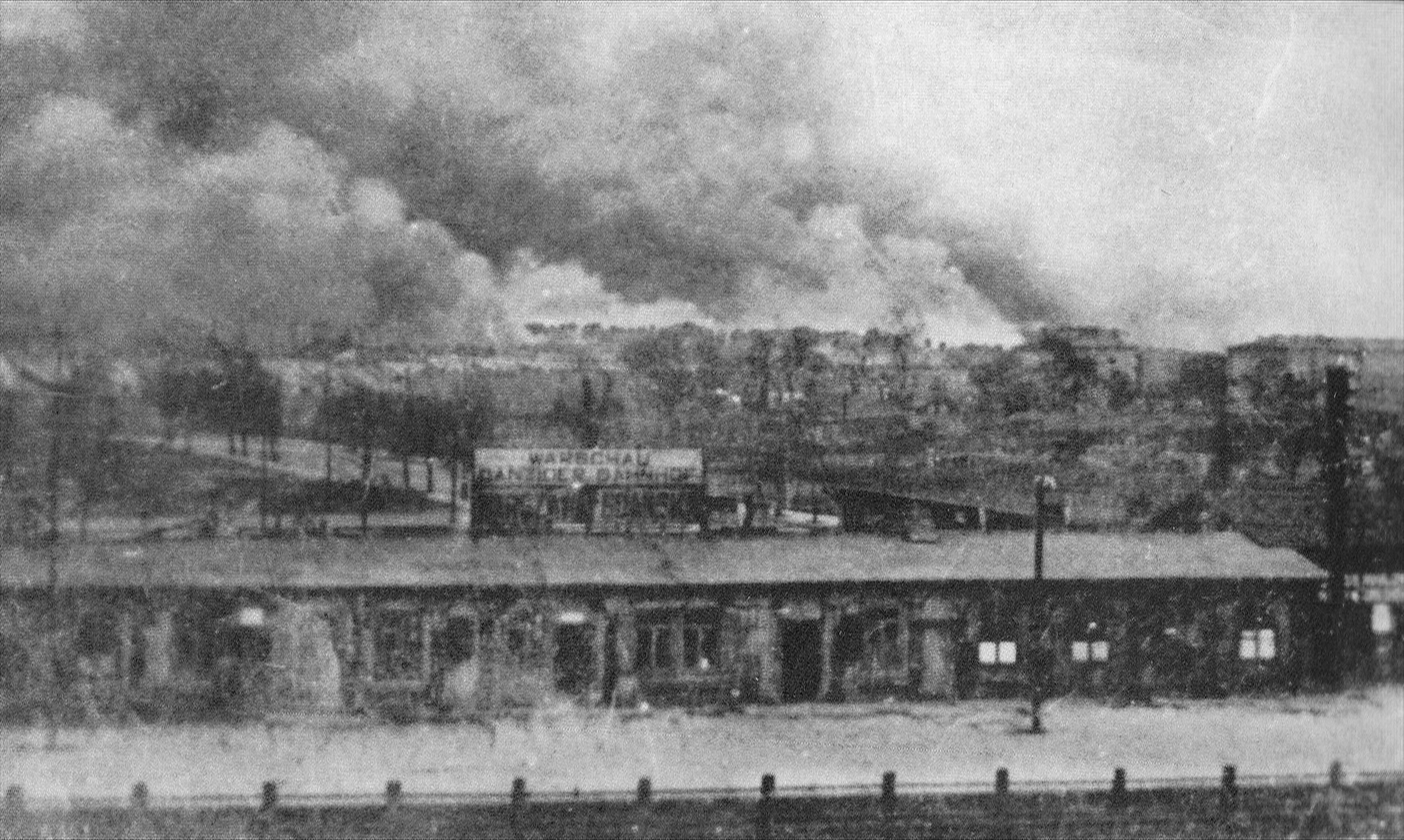
Gdanska railroad station looking toward the Warsaw Ghetto Uprising in 1943

"In mid-April at 4 am, the Germans began to liquidate the Warsaw Ghetto, closed down the remnants of the Jews with a police cordon, went inside tanks and armored cars and carried out their destructive work. We know that you help the martyred Jews as much as you can, I thank you, my countrymen, on my own and the government's behalf, I am asking you to help them in my own name and in the government, I am asking you for help and for extermination of this horrible cruelty. " - Supreme Commander of the Polish Armed Forces in the West and Prime Minister of the Polish government-in-exile gen. Władysław Sikorski - The content of the leaflet published in May 1943 in a circulation of 25,000. by Council for Aid to Jews calling for help to Jews.

Warsaw Ghetto Uprising started on [April 19], 1943, when the German forces attempted to enter territory of Warsaw Ghetto. On the same day, after reports of shooting in the ghetto, the commander of the patrols of the Cpt. Józef Pszenny "Chwacki" ordered an alarm for a previously created 55-man group, which in the strength of three platoons at 18 o'clock got into the vicinity of the wall on Bonifraterska Street in Warsaw. The aim of diversionary and sapper divisions was to break up the walls and, through the breaches, allow the inhabitants of the ghetto to escape Warszawa Gdańska station and Żoliborz and from there to Kampinos Forest.

Loads were prepared within an hour, but the miners had a problem getting into the ghetto wall because of the considerable German forces that were deployed around the walls. On the nearby roofs and balconies, the Germans placed nests heavy machine gun. The German patrols circulated in the streets around. In addition to the planned activities of the "Chwacki" patrols, three cars of Blue Police arrived to which the AK soldiers from the miners' cover opened fire. A shooting took place, which was joined by German forces along with an armored car resulting in the death of two soldiers of the Home Army, Eugeniusz Morawski and Józef Wilk, and the remaining four were wounded. Two Germans were also killed, several were wounded.

"From April 24, daily patrols against Germans near the ghetto, aimed at eliminate the Germans and training their own branches. Up to now without own losses. Some of Germans was eliminated every day." - Report of the Kedyw for the month of April 1943, Warsaw District of the Home Army

Details of the Home Army's operation at the ghetto wall on 19 April 1943

The first concept for relieving the Jewish insurgents by the Home Army (Armia Krajowa) with an attack on the Nazis, involving the blowing up a section of the Warsaw ghetto wall, was conceived in early 1943, some months before the actual outbreak of the uprising. At that time, the strength of the AK's Warsaw District was not especially strong. Tomasz Strzembosz in his book "Armed Actions of Underground Warsaw 1939-1944" leaves no illusions in that, at that time, only the sabotage units were able to take part in an open fight with the Germans. Three units were directly subordinated, among them the forty-member sapper unit of Capt. Jozef Pszenny "Chwacki." to take part and the chief commander of the Home Army issued an order to provide military assistance to the ghetto.

By February 1943 Kedyw (Kierownictwo Dywersji – Directorate of Diversion) assigned a specific unit for the task, which was placed under the command of Józef Pszenny, pseudonym "Chwacki". This unit had carried out a successful attack on German Rail Transports under "Akcja Wieniec" in October 1942. "Chwacki's" unit was tasked to attack the police and gendarmerie posts guarding the ghetto from the outside and to demolish part of the wall at a specifically agreed point, securing the opening created to ensure the safe evacuation of the Jews towards Żoliborz, which opened the way to the Kampinos Forest. During discussions conducted with representatives of the Warsaw AK District Command, the Kedyw Command and representatives of ŻOB (Żydowska Organizacja Bojowa), the Jewish Fighting Organization, it was agreed that a co-ordinated operation was to be carried out on Bonifraterska Street opposite Sapieżyńska Street. Sapieżyńska was to be the escape route for the Jews and for the getaway of the protection units. The Jewish Fighting Organization undertook to support the attempt from their side of the ghetto, concentrating their insurgency groups at the agreed point and creating an area of strong resistance.

The unit was divided into four sections. On the day of action, according to Włodzimierz Malinowski, Chwacki's unit was divided as follows. Section 1, commanded by Władysław Babczyński, with Marian Dukalski, Włodzimierz Malinowski, Zygmunt and Piotr Puchalscy, Edward Branicki, Zygmunt Puterman, Eugeniusz Morawski; section 2: commanded by Mieczysław Zborowicz, with Eustachiusz Malinowski, Aleksander Gozdan, Ryszard Górecki, Bronisław Cholewiński, and Stefan Gąsiorowski; section 3, commanded by Zbigniew Młynarski, with Czesław Młynarski, Orest Fedorenko, Franciszek Jabłonowski, and Henryk Cepek; section 4 commanded by Józef Łapiński, with Zygmunt Malinowski, Józef Wilk, Jacek Malczewski, Leonard Żeliński, Jerzy Potek, Grzegorz Pszenny.

The main goal of the whole operation, the demolition of the ghetto wall, was entrusted to the section under Władysław Babczyński's "Pastora". A gate in a house was selected in the vicinity of Sapieżyńska and Bonifraterska, where members of the unit were to assemble the two mines onto boards under the supervision of "Chwacki". The unit, comprising "Młodek" (Eugeniusz Morawski), "Jasny" (Jerzy Postek), "Tygrys" (Włodzimierz Malinowski) and "Marek" (Marian Dukalski) were tasked with hanging the assembled mines on the ghetto wall, light the fuses and withdraw as quickly as possible.

The mine unit was provided with cover, on one side on the corner of Sapieżyńska and Bonifraterska, where "Pastor" and the rest of his section stood guard, and on the opposite corner, "Gajowy" (Mieczysław Zborowicz), "Lotnik" (Bronisław Cholewiński) and Ulan (Stefan Gąsiorowski). Behind them, in Sapieżyńska Street, "Kruk" (Zygmunt Malinowski) and Jarząbek (Tadeusz Zieliński). A section under "Kret" (Zbigniew Młynarski) occupied the area between Sapierzynska and Konwiktorska. The section between Sapierzyńska and Franciszkańska was covered by "Chmura" (Józef Łapiński) with "Kujawa" (Jacek Mackiewicz) and "Orlik" (Józef Wilk). "Chwacki's" command post was located at the centre of the proposed action, by the entrance to Sapieżyńska.

The weapons available to the Home Army were very limited

"One sten gun for each section of six people. With that pistols, a couple of grenades and that was all. Rather not much, although we were then one of the best armed AK units. It must be remembered that it was the spring of 1943 and the Home Army then had far fewer weapons than a year later, during the Uprising. I remember the briefing at Sternik's, one of my soldiers approached me, a young nineteen-year-old boy, named "Wilk". "Mr. Zygmunt, he says restlessly - what will we be doing with these few grenades, after all Germans have machine guns, tanks, artillery, we are taking a hoe to the sun". - Zygmunt Malinowski "Kruk"

On the day of the Uprising, "Chwacki" arranged for his men to meet at 16.00 at "Sternika", located on Podwale Street where he distributed weapons and gave final orders. Within a short time the units took up their arranged positions along the length of the ghetto wall. However the large numbers of SS and police units that had concentrated along the axis of Swietjerska, Bonifraterska and Muranowska was unforeseen. Machine guns had been placed on the roofs and balconies of the surrounding houses, which were spreading dense fire beyond the walls into the ghetto. The noise of machine guns and explosions in the ghetto drowned out everything. Passers-by, who had gathered along Bonifraterska to watch created a significant impediment for the units. Whereas the crowd made it possible for "Chwacki's" units to reach their designated places, the crowd also made it difficult to communicate between the units spread out along a fairly large area. This hampered overall command over the whole of the action. The mine unit took up their positions, under the supporting section of the "Pastor", in the house at the corner of Sapieżyńska and Bonifraterska. There the unit proceeded to mount the mines on wooden boards and to arm them. "Chwacki" and four of his people took up a position, between the gate where the mines were being prepared and "Gajowy's" position.

At the moment when the mine unit came out from behind the gate, three trucks full of Germans and "Navy uniformed" police arrived. Two left in the direction of Konwiktorska, the last one stopped at the corner of Sapieżyńska. "Chwacki" waited for an opportune moment before giving the order to start the action but a German gendarme sees "Tygrys" and the others carrying the mines and runs towards them armed with a weapon. As a result, "Marek" and "Kruk" and then the "Gajowy's" section open fire. The shooting becomes the signal for action by all the units, which created panic in the crowd and causing people to run in all directions. The group carrying the mine was pushed backwards by the retreating crowd and found themselves exposed and at some distance from the wall. During the firing that followed, the cordon that had been stationed along the wall was largely eliminated with green uniformed bodies lying outstretched along the street

On seeing "Chwacki" and his units, the Germans redirected their machine guns towards them and started firing. The German fire power was overwhelming, as German soldiers were deployed behind the walls of the ghetto and on the roofs of the nearby houses. "Chwacki" and then "Tygrys" threw grenades over the ghetto wall in an attempt to limit the effectiveness of the German fire. At the same time the unit carrying the mines, made up of about 70 kg of explosives, made its way under fire towards the ghetto wall. However they were unable to reach the wall as machine gun fire was directed at them, killing "Młodek" and alongside him "Orlik". Four others were wounded, one very seriously and so they were forced to retreat leaving the mines on the road. Jewish insurgents also took part and had opened fire and threw grenades from the ghetto side of the wall.

However it became apparent that the attempt was not going to succeed. The Germans, after their initial surprise, were able to take control of the situation and the access to the wall by the mine unit or from inside the ghetto by ŻOB was no longer possible. "Chwacki" issued an order to collect the wounded and withdraw. As soon as his men were at a sufficient distance from the mines, he lit the fuses and joined the retreating group. Soon afterwards the mines detonated with a powerful explosion that echoed off the ghetto wall with smoke rising into the sky. The units began their escape along Sapieżyńska with the wounded soldiers carried on their backs. At Zakroczymska their way was blocked by a group of German airmen who opened fire, but the AK soldiers silenced them with grenades. The units manage to reach the safe house at Nowiniarska and then dispersed in small groups to their homes.

"Although our task was unsuccessful, the actions of the Home Army did not end there, and the Kedyw diversionary units carried out a dozen or so outings on the Germans liquidating the ghetto, and we carried out large-scale operations to pull Jews out of the ghetto through the canals as long as and until the Germans filled them all in. Capt.Jozef Pszenny "Chwacki"

Participation of the Polish underground in the uprising was many times confirmed by a report of the German commander Jürgen Stroop, who wrote:

"When we invaded the Ghetto for the first time, the Jews and the Polish bandits succeeded in repelling the participating units, including tanks and armored cars, by a well-prepared concentration of fire. (...) The main Jewish battle group, mixed with Polish bandits, had already retired during the first and second day to the so-called Muranowski Square. There, it was reinforced by a considerable number of Polish bandits. Its plan was to hold the Ghetto by every means in order to prevent us from invading it. (...) Time and again Polish bandits found refuge in the Ghetto and remained there undisturbed, since we had no forces at our disposal to comb out this maze. (...) One such battle group succeeded in mounting a truck by ascending from a sewer in the so-called Prosta [Street], and in escaping with it (about 30 to 35 bandits). (...) The bandits and Jews – there were Polish bandits among these gangs armed with carbines, small arms, and in one case a light machine gun – mounted the truck and drove away in an unknown direction".

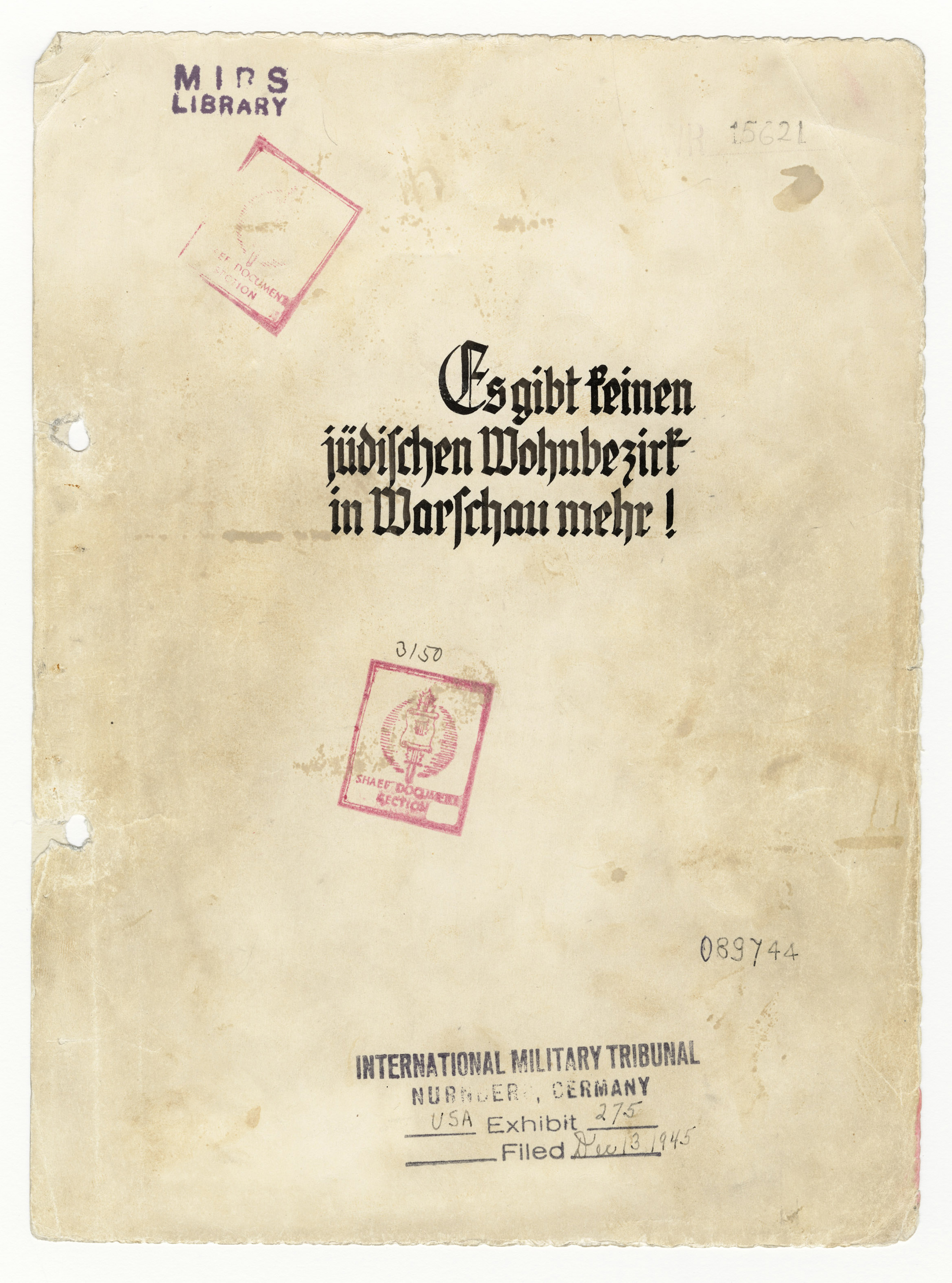
The cover page of The Stroop Report with International Military Tribunal in Nuremberg markings.

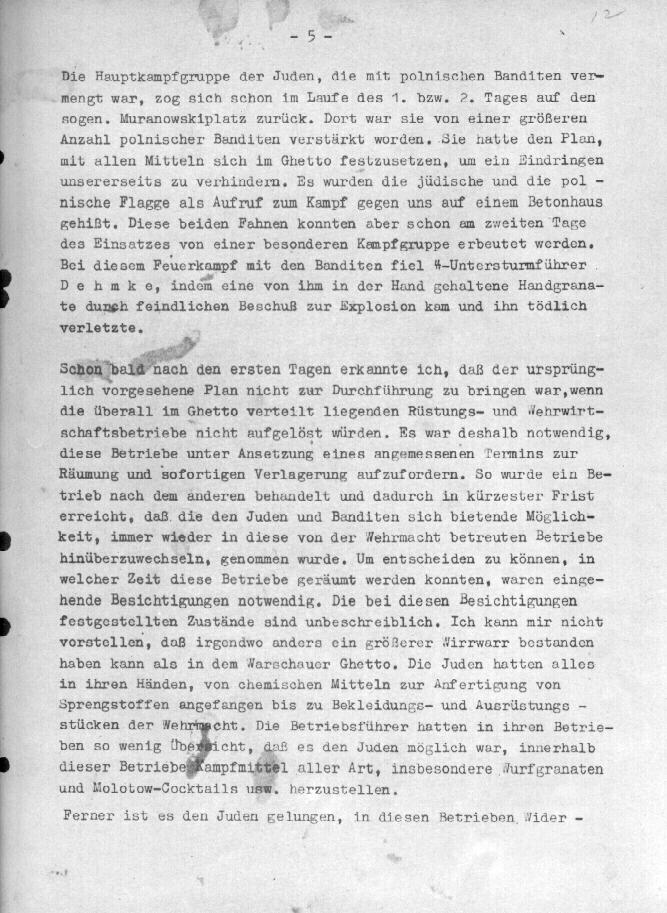
Page 5 of Stroop Report describing German fight against "Juden mit polnischen Banditen" - "Jews with Polish bandits".

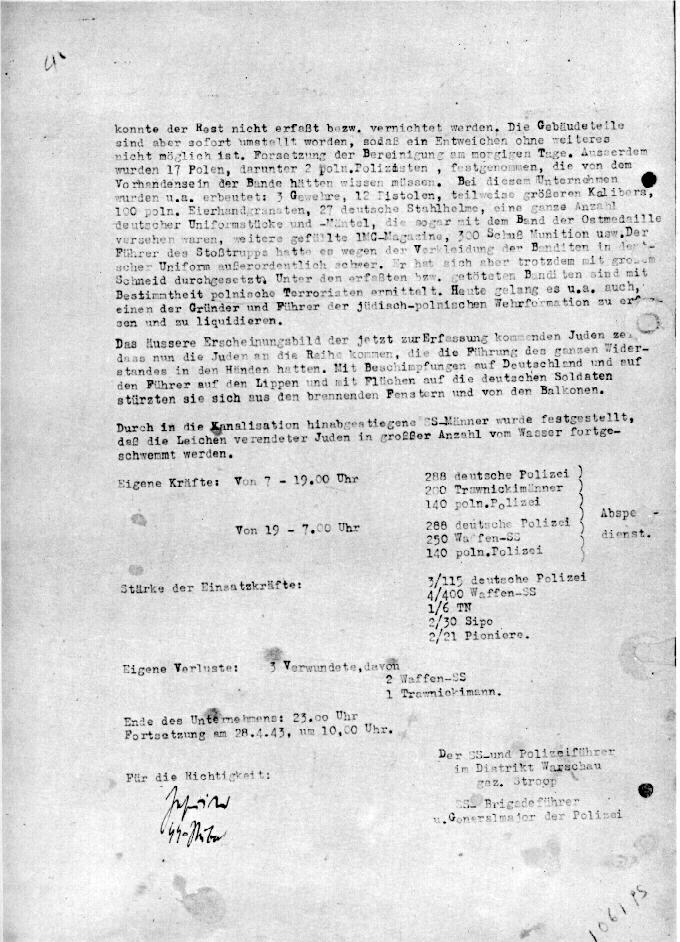
Continuation 27 April 1943 describing fight against "jüdisch-polnische Wehrformation" ("Jewish-Polish armed formation").

== Bibliography ==
- Strzembosz, Tomasz (1983). "Akcje zbrojne podziemnej Warszawy 1939–1944" (eng. Armed actions of underground Warsaw 1939-1944) (in Polish). Warszawa: Państwowy Instytut Wydawniczy. ISBN 83-06-00717-4.
- Witkowski, Henryk (1984). "Kedyw okręgu warszawskiego Armii Krajowej w latach 1943-1944" (eng. Kedyw of Warsaw district of the Home Army in the years 1943-1944) (in Polish). Warszawa: Instytut Wydawniczy Związków Zawodowych. ISBN 83-202-0217-5.
- Lukas, Richard Conrad (2012). "The Forgotten Holocaust: The Poles Under German Occupation 1939–1944". Hippocrene Books. ISBN 978-0-7818-1302-0.
- Arens, Moshe (2007). "Flags over the Warsaw Ghetto: The Untold Story of Warsaw Ghetto Uprising". Gefen Publishing House. ISBN 978-965-229-356-5.
- Kermisch, Yosef (1986). "To live with honour and die with honour! Selected documents from the Warsaw Ghetto Undergroung Archives. Oneg Shabbat". Jerusalem: Yad Vashem. ISBN 965-229-356-3.
- Wdowiński, David (1963). "And we are not saved". New York: Philosophical Library. ISBN 0-8022-2486-5.
- Edelman, Marek (2014). "The Ghetto Fights". London: Bookmark. ISBN 978-1-909026-39-1. Full text in Edelman, Marek. "The Ghetto Fights". Literature of the Holocaust. University of Pennsylvania.
- Wroński, Stanisław (1971). "Polacy i Żydzi 1939–1945" (eng. Poles and Jews 1939-1945) (in Polish). Warsaw: Książka i Wiedza.
- Juergen Stroop (1979). The Stroop Report: "The Jewish Quarter of Warsaw is No More!". Sybil Milton, transl. New York: Pantheon. ISBN 978-0-394-50443-8. (English translation)
- Jürgen Stroop (2009). Andrzej Żbikowski (ed.). Żydowska dzielnica mieszkaniowa w Warszawie już nie istnieje! / Es gibt keinen jüdischen Wohnbezirk in Warschau mehr! (PDF). Warsaw: Instytut Pamięci Narodowej, Żydowski Instytut Historyczny. ISBN 978-83-7629-455-1. (IPN copy; Polish translation: pages 23–112 and German original: pages 113-238; photographs)
