= Józef Pszenny =

Polish military commander (1910–1993)

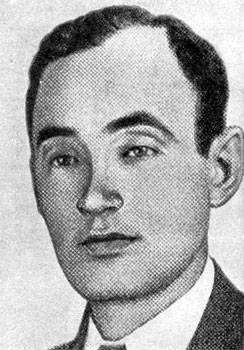
Pre war photo of Józef Pszenny.

Józef Pszenny (born March 17, 1910, in Pruszyn, February 3, 1993, in Chicago) - Polish military commander, sapper captain of Polish Army, head of the Sapper Department of "XII-s" Warsaw District of Home Army.

== History ==
In 1939 during the September campaign, holding the rank of lieutenant, he commanded the 2nd company of sappers of the 7 Sapper Battalion. During the German occupation of Poland, he was the creator of the underground sabotage group Batalion Saperów Praskich (eng. Praga Sapper Battalion), which was established in 1940, bearing the colloquial name of "Chwacki Battalions". Later, he was the commander of the disposable patrol squad separated in the middle of 1942 from the Sapper's Battalion, and at the same time commanded the line battalion of this branch constituting its staff and technical facilities. At the end of July 1943, "Chwacki" was dismissed to work in the command of the Sapper Department of "XII-s" District Warsaw AK, and his position was taken by Ludwik Witkowski "Kosa".

After the war he was in exile in the United States, where he was active in veteran organizations.

== Military service ==
Józef Pszenny, as commander of the 3rd patrol of miners, took part in:

- Operation Wieniec - campaign carried out on 7–8 October 1942 on the Warsaw-Siedlce railway line.
- Ghetto Action - an attempt to blow up part of the walls surrounding the Warsaw Ghetto during the Warsaw Ghetto Uprising on 19 April 1943.
- Action in Końskie - sabotage action of the Home Army carried out between 31 August and 1 September 1943, on the railway infrastructure around Warsaw, the aim of which was to completely block the railway traffic in this area.
- Two actions aimed at taking over the weapons from German rail transport. The first one on the Skruda railway station (currently Halinów) on the Warsaw - Siedlce route, whose aim was to take over the train carrying the armament to the eastern front. The action was carried out on the night of 11 to 12 September 1943, the other was held at night from 4 to 5 October 1943 at the Dębe Wielkie station.

== Bibliography ==
- Strzembosz, Tomasz (1983). "Akcje zbrojne podziemnej Warszawy 1939–1944" (eng. Armed actions of underground Warsaw 1939-1944) (in Polish). Warszawa: Państwowy Instytut Wydawniczy. ISBN 8306007174.
- Strzembosz, Tomasz (1983). "Oddziały szturmowe konspiracyjnej Warszawy 1939–1944" (eng. Assault troops of the underground Warsaw of 1939-1944) p.241–243 (in Polish). Warszawa: Państwowy Instytut Wydawniczy. ISBN 8301042036.
