= Franciszek Niepokólczycki =

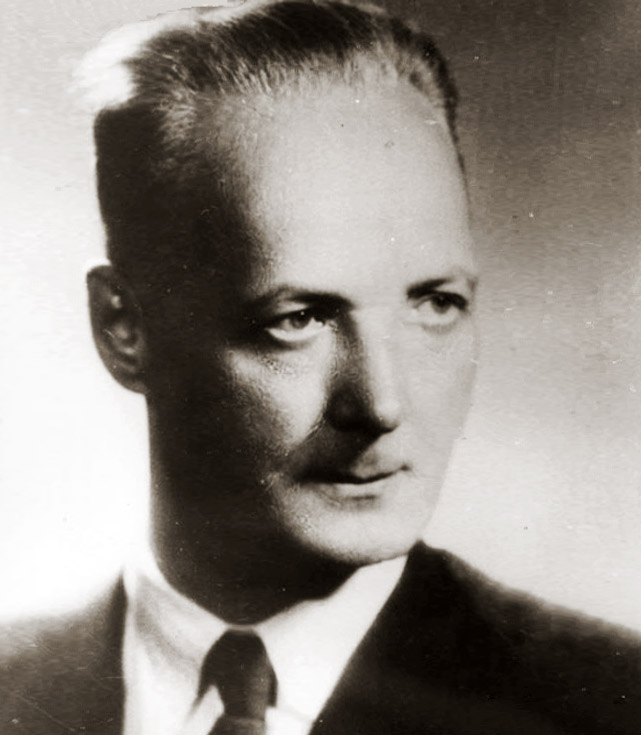
- Nicknames: Teodor, Szubert, Franek, Żejmian, Halny
- Born: 27 October 1900; Zhytomyr, Russian Empire
- Died: 11 June 1974 (aged 73) Warsaw, Poland
- Rank: Colonel
- Conflicts: Warsaw Uprising

Franciszek Niepokólczycki alias Teodor, Szubert, Franek, Żejmian, Halny (27 October 1900 – 11 June 1974) was a colonel of Polish Army. During World War II, commander of the Union of Retaliation, officer of the Union of Armed Struggle and the Kedyw of Home Army. President of the Freedom and Independence from 1945 to 1946 and political prisoner of the Stalinist period.

== Biography ==
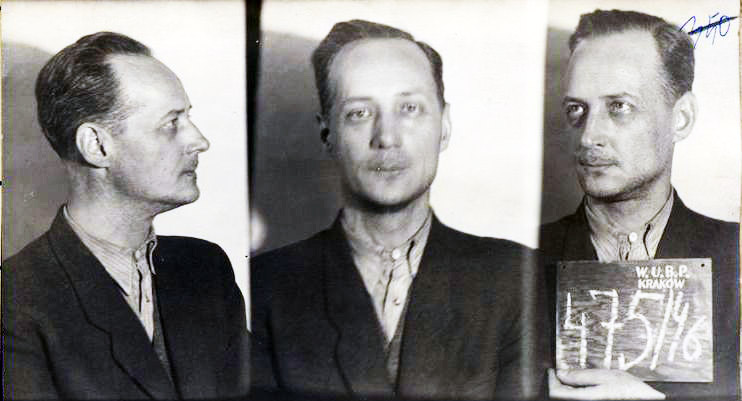
Franciszek Niepokólczycki after arrest in 1946

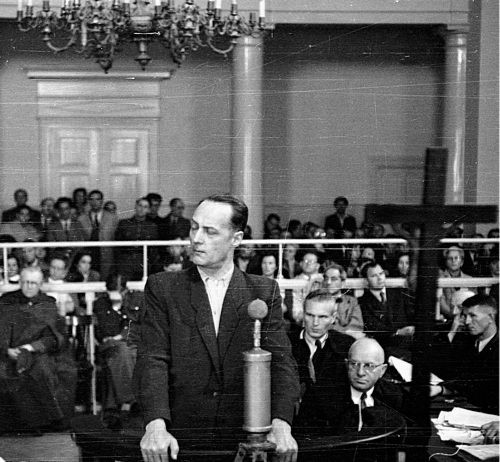
Franciszek Niepokólczycki during the show trial in 1947

From November 1918 on he was a member of Polish Military Organisation in Zhytomyr. During the Polish-Soviet War in 1920 he fought in irregular units. He served in the Polish Army from 1922 in the 10th Sapper Regiment in Przemyśl and in the 3rd Sapper Battalion in Wilno. He took part in the Invasion of Poland against Nazi invaders as commander of the 60th Sapper Battalion in Army Modlin.

After the defeat of Poland he joined the anti-Nazi underground. As early as 27 September 1939 he joined Service for Poland's Victory, later transformed into Union of Armed Struggle (ZWZ). In 1940 he was made a leader of a special "Reprisal" unit of ZWZ charged with sabotage and armed struggle. He was a co-organizer of the Directorate of Sabotage and Diversion, Kedyw, of the Home Army, and in 1943 he was made the second in command of the unit, after Gen. Emil Fieldorf ("Nil"). He fought in the Warsaw Uprising as chief of the Sapper's Section of the 3rd Regiment of AK's Headquarters, with the rank of colonel. After the surrender of the uprising he was imprisoned and in January 1945 sent to The Woldenberg II C Oflag.

After returning to Poland from his imprisonment he became once again involved in the resistance, this time directed against the new communist authorities. Initially he was the second in command of Col. Antoni Sanojcy of Region "South" of the Armed Forces Delegation for Poland, and later the president of the southern region for the organization Freedom and Independence (WiN). As president of WiN he took the step of recognizing the Polish Government in Exile (which by this time was no longer recognized as the official government of Poland by the Allies) as the legitimate governing body and took the decision of expanding the activities of WiN. He made the organization grow and hoped to lead it to a point where eventually it could be made legal.

On 22 October 1946 Niepokólczycki was arrested by the Polish secret police (UB) in Kraków. A year later, in a show trial of WiN leaders he was sentenced to death. This sentence was later changed to life imprisonment.

On the wave of political changes in Polish October, on 22 December 1956 released from prison. After being released, he had no problems finding a job and received compensation. However, it was the object of observation by officers of the Security Service. He did not join the Society of Fighters for Freedom and Democracy.

From 1958 he was the deputy director of the plant at the Association of Polish Inventors. He was buried in the Roman Catholic cemetery in Brwinów.

== Honours and awards ==
- Order of the White Eagle (15 August 2008, awarded posthumously by President Lech Kaczynski)
- Silver Cross of the Virtuti Militari (1944)
- Cross of Independence (1931)
- Cross of Valour – four times
- Silver Cross of Merit (1928)
