= Operation Wieniec =

Operation Wieniec (Polish: Akcja Wieniec, "Operation Garland") was a large-scale World War II anti-Nazi Home Army operation. It took place on the night of 7 to 8 October 1942, targeting rail infrastructure near Warsaw. Similar operations, aimed at disrupting German transport and communications in occupied Poland, occurred in subsequent months and years, targeting railroads, bridges and supply depots, primarily near transport hubs such as Warsaw and Lublin.

== History ==
Permission to carry out the operation was granted on 5 August 1942 by General Wladyslaw Sikorski. Preparations were started immediately, upon order of General Stefan Rowecki, who obliged Colonel Antoni Chrusciel to make the pioneers ready. The Home Army headquarters selected Colonel Zbigniew Lewandowski as commandant of the operation, together with Colonel Józef Pszenny, Colonel Leon Tarajkiewicz and Zofia Franio. The purpose of the action was to paralyse rail transports in the area of Warsaw, and it was to be carried out by 40 men, divided into eight teams. General Rowecki decided that Wieniec would take place in the night of October 7–8, 1942.

The eight teams were divided into two groups. The first one, under Jozef Pszenny, operated on the right bank of the Vistula, the second one, under Zbigniew Lewandowski, operated on the left bank of the river. Pszenny's team, consisting of four groups, began the operation on October 8, at 0:25, when the group of Sergeant Waclaw Klosiewicz blew up rail tracks on the route from Warsaw to Malkinia (near Zielonka). Two minutes later, the group of Colonel Mieczyslaw Zborowicz blew up tracks on a concrete bridge near Anin, on the route from Warsaw to Dęblin. At 1:10, the group of Colonel Jozef Pszenny blew up tracks on the route Warsaw - Siedlce, near Rembertow. At the same time, the group of Colonel Wladyslaw Babczynski blew up tracks on the route Warsaw - Dzialdowo, north of Warsaw.

The team of Colonel Lewandowski, also consisting of four groups, operated on the left bank of the Vistula. It began its action app. 90 minutes later. At 2:10, the group of Lewandowski blew up tracks between stations Warsaw West and Warsaw Wlochy. Nearby operating group of Colonel Leon Tarajkiewicz blew up tracks towards Radom. A female group of Antonina Mijal blew tracks on the route towards Piaseczno, and finally, at 2:45, the group of Colonel Stanislaw Gasiorowski destroyed tracks on the route towards Skierniewice.

As a result of the operation, rail traffic in Warsaw was stopped for almost 12 hours. No losses were reported by Polish groups, and fearing German reprisals, the Home Army tried to present the operation as the work of Soviet saboteurs, sent to Poland by air. The Germans, however, punished Polish civilians, shooting 39 inmates of the Pawiak prison (Oct 15.), and publicly hanging further 50 inmates.

== See also ==
- Sabotage

== Bibliography ==
- Strzembosz, Tomasz (1983). "Akcje zbrojne podziemnej Warszawy 1939–1944" (eng. Armed actions of underground Warsaw 1939-1944) (in Polish). Warszawa: Państwowy Instytut Wydawniczy. ISBN 8306007174.
