= Union of Retaliation =

Polish World War II resistance organisation

Union of Retaliation (Polish: Związek Odwetu or Z.O.) was a Polish World War II resistance organisation established on 20 April 1940. It was created by General Stefan Rowecki, head of the Armed Resistance, as that organization's branch dedicated to sabotage and covert operations.

== Early history ==
The ZO was formed out of a variety of previously existent sabotage groups which were then merged into the ZWZ. Initially a part of the ZWZ, all of them were then separated. Thus the risk of eliminating the whole ZWZ by destruction of one of its sabotage cells was eliminated.

Initially headed by Maj. Franciszek Niepokólczycki Teodor, the organization was aimed at diminishing the German military and industrial potential by means of active and passive sabotage. It also carried out a number of revenge actions as a reprisal for particularly brutal German mass shootings, łapankas or other actions aimed at Polish civilians. The net of sabotage and intelligence cells organized by the ZO included almost every major German-controlled factory in occupied Poland, as well as a number of special detachments, used by the ZO's headquarters for particularly difficult actions.

== Increased resistance measures ==
German supply train derailed in a Zwiazek Odwetu sabotage operation in occupied Poland, ca. 1942.

In February 1942, the commander in chief of the Polish forces and the prime minister of Poland, Gen. Władysław Sikorski, withdrew his order of limiting armed resistance in Poland, the ZO's network started to grow significantly. It also organized a number of spectacular actions against the German war effort. Out of several hundred thousand actions (mainly in Silesia, Lesser Poland, Holy Cross Mountains and Mazovia), perhaps the best known is the Wieniec. During that action, carried out in October 1942, the Polish resistance blew up all railways leading from and to Warsaw, destroyed 4 German supply trains going for the Eastern Front and disrupted the supply transport for several days (with the Warsaw train hub being cut out for roughly 15 hours). In December, the action was continued by the ZO in Eastern Poland, as a reprisal for the German terror in the area around Zamość.

== Merger into Armia Krajowa ==
After the ZWZ was reformed into the Armia Krajowa, the ZO was again incorporated into it, merged with the Wachlarz and OSA units and formed the backbone of the Kedyw organization. During the later stages of its existence, the ZO was headed by Maj. Jan Wojciech Kiwerski.
