= Battle of Muranów Square =

1943 battle part of the Warsaw Ghetto Uprising

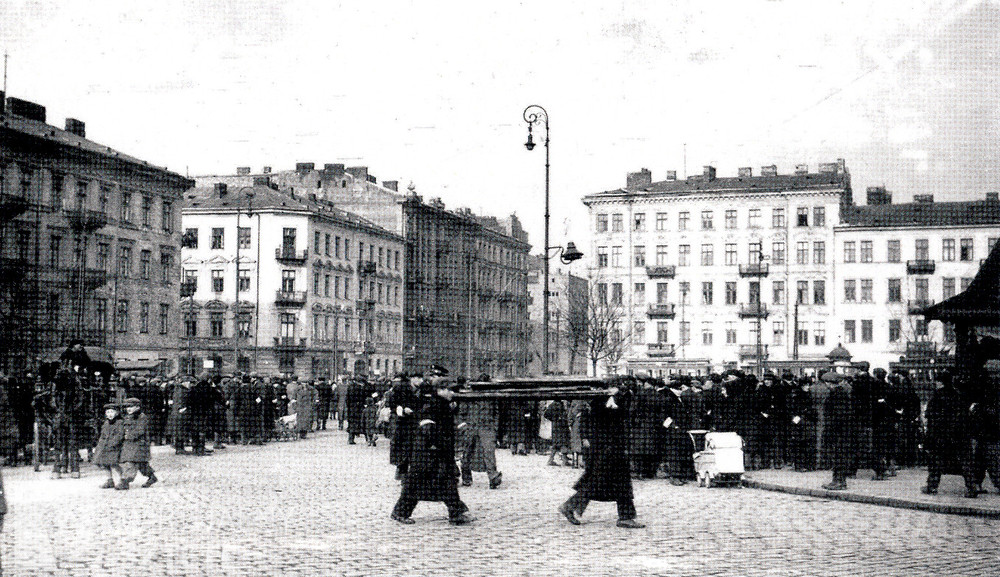
Muranów Square in Warsaw, 1941. View to the northeastern corner of the square − Sierakowska (left) and Muranowska (right) streets

The Battle of Muranów Square was a battle between the Jewish Military Union (ŻZW) and Third Reich troops which took place during the Warsaw Ghetto Uprising on April 19–22, 1943. The fighting between the German pacification forces under Jürgen Stroop, which were destroying the ghetto, and the Jewish insurgent forces of ŻZW, under Paweł Frenkel, took place in the now non-existent Muranów Square.

== Background ==
After the liquidation of the Warsaw ghetto, carried out by the Nazis in the summer of 1942, about 300 thousand Jews were forcefully deported to the Treblinka extermination camp and murdered there.

A group of young Jewish activists founded two military organizations to fight the Nazis: the Jewish Combat Organization (ŻOB), which was associated with the left-wing Bund, and the Jewish Military Union (ŻZW), associated with the right-wing Zionists-Revisionists. These organizations, due to political differences, did not reach an agreement on the issue of joining forces (the ŻOB being the majority of them offered the revisionists to join their ranks one by one, not as a separate organization). According to Marek Edelman, few days before the outbreak of the uprising the two armed groups met in the ghetto. Apart from Edelman, the ŻOB was also represented by Mordechai Anielewicz and Icchak Cukierman. According to Edelman, the fighters from ŻZW took out their revolvers and, by blackmailing the members of ŻOB, tried to force them to subordinate to their organization. There was a brawl and gunfire between the two groups, fortunately, no one was wounded. Considering the severe tensions and even hatred in Palestine between the dominant Socialists and the Revisionists (e.g. post-war (Hunting) Season and Altalena) the verity of the above is uncertain.

The fighters did not reach an agreement, but later, for pragmatic reasons, embarked on limited military cooperation, dividing up zones of influence in defense of the ghetto area in the event of another entry of German troops.

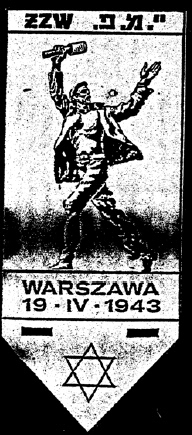
Pennant of the Jewish Military Union

The area of military activity of the Jewish Military Union was the vicinity of the now non-existent Muranów Square, located between Muranowska Street and Nalewki Street, in the Warsaw district of Muranów (this place corresponds to the present intersection of Stawki and Józefa Lewartowskiego Streets). The headquarters of ŻZW were located at 7 Muranowska Street. The units of the Union were divided into three groups - two of them defended the so-called "Shops" - factories where ghetto prisoners worked, located outside the ghetto wall, which was reduced after the liquidation operation. The third group, much larger, was located in Muranów Square, where six units, each consisting of 20 soldiers, manned houses in Muranowska Street with numbers 1, 3, 5, 7-9 and 40. The positions of ŻZW were in contact with the positions of ŻOB, who occupied the houses at Zamenhofa, Miła, Gęsia and Nalewki Streets. The ŻZW units in Muranów Square had at their disposal an excellently equipped arsenal, located in an abandoned house at 7 Muranowska Street. A Jewish historian and an eyewitness Emanuel Ringelblum, who visited their quarters, was impressed by the arsenal of weapons they had gathered, he writes about the preparations for the uprising in his diary. He saw various types of weapons hanging on the walls and also witnessed the purchase of their next batch by Jewish fighters.

== Battle ==
Fighting in the square started immediately after the beginning of the Uprising, on April 19, 1943, and lasted for at least 3 days. According to Dawid Wdowiński, a soldier and commander of ŻZW, a white-blue Jewish flag was hung on the house at 7-9 Muranowska Street, where the headquarters of ŻZW were located, and stayed there for 5 days after the beginning of the uprising. According to other accounts, there were two flags hanging there: the white-blue Jewish flag and the white-red Polish flag; this is confirmed by the accounts of the historian Emanuel Ringelblum, Władysław Bartoszewski and Alicja Kaczyńska, who noted this fact in her memoirs. The two flags are also mentioned in the report by Jürgen Stroop, in the testimony by Ryszard Walewski at Stroop's trial, and in the account of Stroop written by his post-war fellow prisoner, Kazimierz Moczarski, in “Rozmowy z katem” [“Conversations with an Executioner”]. Contemporary accounts also appeared in a counterintelligence report of the Government Delegation for Poland (April 23), and in the Polish underground press publications Nowy Dzień (April 21) and Robotnik (May 1). (After the war, the flag incident was highlighted by Israeli politician Moshe Sharett in a noted 1949 Flag Speech, with his quote later appearing on the 20 new shekel banknote, Series B.)

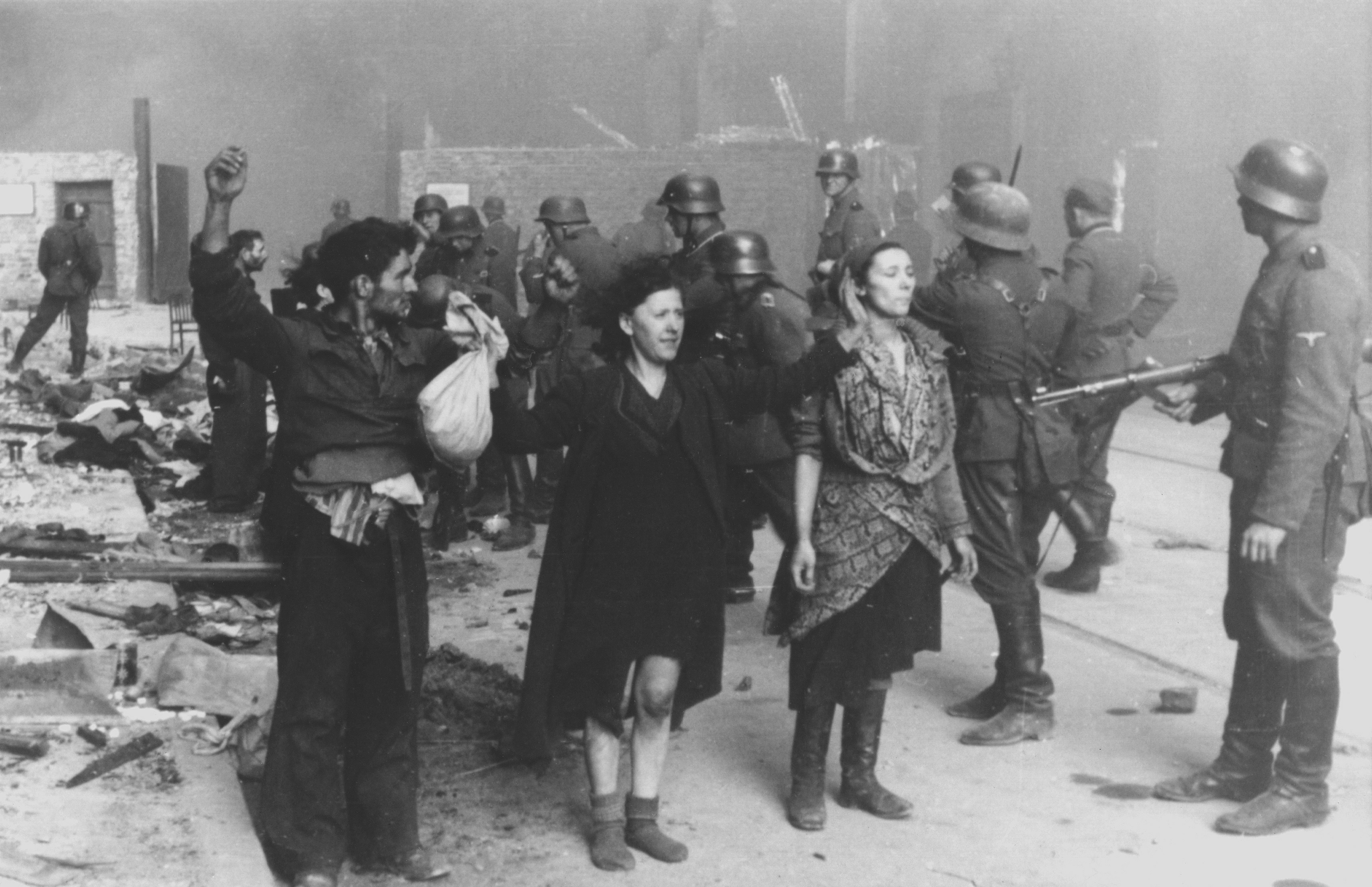
A photograph from the Stroop Report. Original German caption: "These bandits fought in an armed resistance". Picture taken at Nowolipie street looking East, near intersection with Smocza street. In the back one can see ghetto wall with a gate.

The first clash took place when the German units approached Nalewki Street in the morning of April 19 - the insurgents opened fire on them with machine guns and hand guns, forcing the Nazis to retreat in the afternoon. During the fights that day, two commanders of the ŻZW, Paweł Frenkel and Leon Rodal, dressed up as SS officers, approached a unit of Ukrainian soldiers grouped near the square and attacked them by surprise, breaking the encircling of the Jewish units and restoring their contact with the rest of the insurgents. According to Kazimierz Iranek-Osmecki, later the head of the Home Army Main Command's Intelligence, the Germans, after capturing the ŻOB resistance point on Gęsia Street, attacked ŻZW positions at Muranów Square, commanded by Paweł Frenkel.

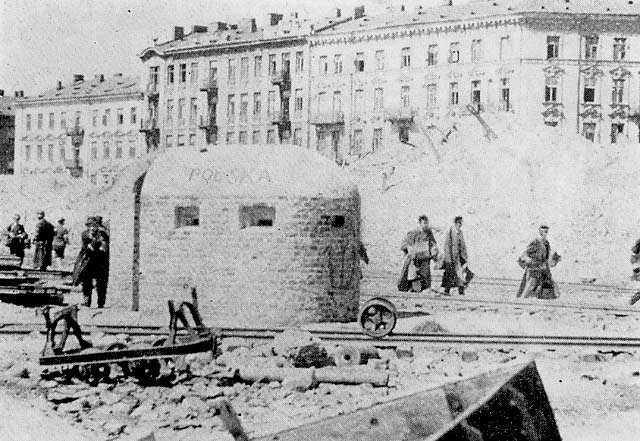
Houses at 6-10 Muranowska Street during the Warsaw Uprising in 1944

On the night of April 19–20, the command of the ŻZW held a meeting, during which it was decided to distribute the reserve of weapons among all the insurgents, so that it would not fall into the hands of the Nazis in case they acquired the arsenal. Heavy fights continued over the next few days, and when Jürgen Stroop took command of the Nazi army, they became even more intense as the Germans used tactics of destroying individual houses, burning and bombing them using heavy cannons. The insurgents, using hidden passages between the houses, attacked Germans by surprise, but at the same time they lost all communication and could only contact each other at night. On the fourth day of the fights, the Muranów unit was joined by a group of ŻZW from the "shop" of brushers in Świętojerska Street, which was captured by a German armored unit. According to Wdowiński, on the fifth day of the uprising, the flag was still on the command building at Muranów Square, and the insurgents were still defending themselves by shooting from the windows.

Little is known about the fate of the ŻZW units in the central ghetto after they lost contact. On April 21 a ŻZW unit was still fighting in Franciszkańska and Miła Streets. Some units withdrew that day outside the ghetto wall, trying, with the help of the Polish organization "Miecz i Pług" (Sword and Plough), to get out of Warsaw to a forest near Otwock. However, they were denounced by the MiP (an organization penetrated by Gestapo agents) to the Germans and died fighting on the road to Otwock. Some of the units stayed in the ghetto and kept fighting. On May 2, 1943, the group moved out of the ghetto to a flat at Grzybowska Street, where they were surrounded and killed.

=== Account by Władysław Zajdler ===
According to Władysław Zajdler "Żarski", on April 27 the battle on Muranów Square was also assisted by an 18-person squad of the "W" squadron of the Security Corps (an autonomous organization associated with the Home Army), commanded by Henryk Iwański "Bystry". The unit consisted of a team headed by Władysław Zajdler "Żarski" and a section of Lejewski "Garbarz". According to Zajdler, on April 27 Poles got there through a tunnel, with replenishment of weapons, ammunition and food, but due to the complete exhaustion of insurgents they replaced the ŻZW unit under the command of David Apfelbaum on the key position between the ruins in the area of the no longer existing Muranów Square and Nalewki Street (today's Bohaterów Getta Street), repelling German and Latvian attacks supported by armored weapons. Żarski relates:

"On April 26, 1943, through a liaison officer of the Jewish Military Union, we received a report that the commander of the section Dawid Moryc Apfelbaum was injured and demanded help in the form of weapons and ammunition. The Jewish units regained access to a tunnel stretching under the road and reaching the basement of a house outside the ghetto wall, at 7 Muranów Square... SC's Main Headquarters ordered us to organize the passage of our combat group to the ghetto area. The group was supposed to join the fight, repel the Nazis from the vicinity of the tunnel and help to move the wounded women and children to the "Aryan" side. (...) An attack of SS infantry started under the cover of two tanks. Grenades and bullets of Polish and Jewish fighters fighting shoulder to shoulder fell on the Nazis. The attack was repelled. The fighters collected the conquered weapons".

Three subordinates of Iwański, his brother and two of his sons, were allegedly killed in heavy all-day defensive battles, as well as ten Jews, among them Dawid Apfelbaum. Iwański himself was injured and, together with 30 other wounded people, was taken back through a tunnel by his surviving soldiers. According to some studies, "together with ŻZW, on that day a unit of the Security Corps under the command of Captain Iwański (...) fights in the ghetto, suffering some losses (including the death of his son)".

Henryk Iwański also reported that he and the Security Corps provided arms to the ŻZW before the operation: "We supplied (...) arms, ammunition and grenades (...) from 1940 to 1943.) In March and April 1943, before the outbreak of the uprising, we delivered to the ghetto large quantities of machine and hand weapons, ammunition, several boxes of "Filipinka" grenades (...) During the uprising in the ghetto our people, mainly firemen - members of the Security Corps supplied Jewish fighters with ammunition about 20 times". Iwański's accounts were also confirmed by Tadeusz Bednarczyk "Bednarz" - a messenger between ŻZW and Security Coprs, who was to deliver weapons personally to Jews.

== Controversy ==
Historians do not agree on the participation of Poles from the Security Corps in the battles in Muranów Square on April 27, 1943. According to Barbara Engelking and Jacek Leociak, the account is not confirmed by any other sources, and it is known that ŻZW units left the ghetto before April 27. So while this account may be true, according to these historians, Zajdler is wrong as to the date or place of the fights.

According to Dariusz Libionka and Laurence Weinbaum, not only did Zajdler falsify the accounts about his participation in the ghetto fights in order to obtain veteran privileges, but also did Iwański. They argue that Zajdler's account of the battle did not appear until 1962, and in his earlier, very extensive account of 1948, Iwański does not mention the battle of 27 April, the death of his family members, or the joint fight with Zajdler. Libionka and Weinbaum, referring to other inaccuracies (e.g. the date of the founding of the Security Corps was not until the autumn of 1943), claim that the accounts of Iwański and Zajdler are untrue. The authors also question the fact that two flags, one Jewish and the other Polish, were hung in the ghetto. In their opinion, it is a beautiful legend, unfortunately not confirmed by serious historical sources. They also dispute the existence of Dawid Apfelbaum.

=== Description of the Battle in the Stroop Report ===
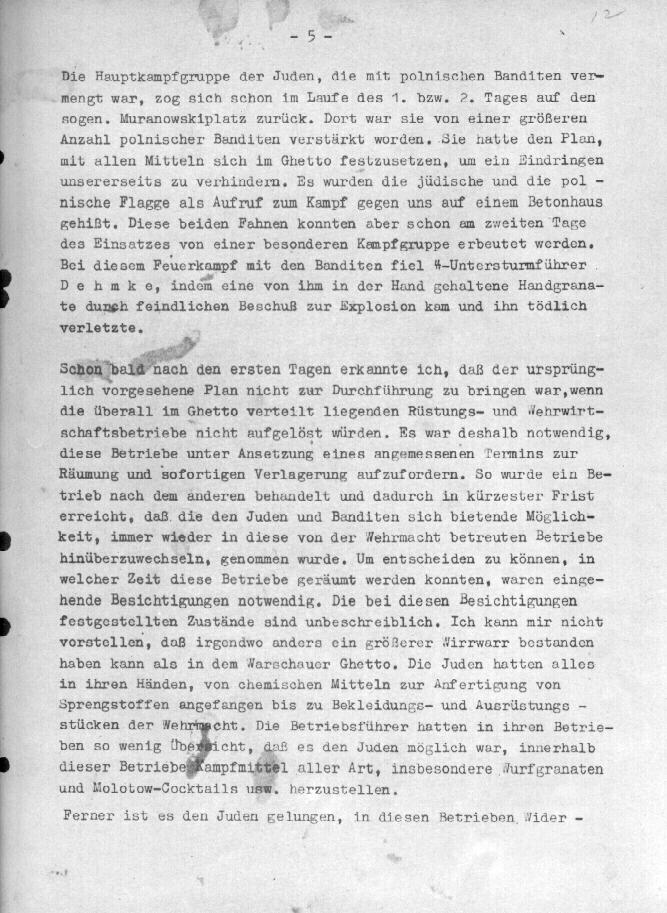
Fifth page of the Stroop Report describing the Battle of Muranów Square

The military operations in Muranów Square are also reported in a 75-page report by Jürgen Stroop, SS and police general, who was the commander of German units fighting the uprising. According to the report:

“The main group of Jews, mixed with Polish bandits, withdrew to the so-called Muranów Square on the first or second day of the fights. There, they were rearmed by a large group of Polish bandits. This group decided to fortify in every possible way to prevent us from further penetration of the ghetto area. They raised two flags on the roof of the concrete building, Jewish and Polish, as a signal to fight against us. These two flags were captured on the second day of the operation during a raid of the special battle group. SS Untersturmführer Demke was killed in the fight against the bandits.” (Stroop Report, April 1943).

On 27 April, in his report, Jürgen Stroop wrote down information that might partially confirm Żarski's account. It describes German fights against a large group of Jewish insurgents located in buildings adjacent to the north-eastern part of the ghetto, located outside the ghetto in Muranów. Stroop sent units there under Diehl's command on the basis of a denunciation, which was sent to the German command. The Germans discovered a group of 120 people "strongly armed with guns, rifles and light machine guns", which fought back. During the battle, "24 bandits were killed and 52 arrested". The fighting dragged on until the next day. Stroop writes down:

"(...) we arrested 17 Poles, among them two Polish policemen, who should have known about the existence of this gang. We captured 3 rifles, 12 pistols, partly larger calibers, 100 Polish grenades, 27 German helmets, a large number of German uniforms and coats, ammunition for machine guns, 300 ammunition magazines, and so on. The commanding officer of the assault unit had a difficult task to fulfill, because many bandits were wearing German uniforms. But in spite of this, he dealt with it vigorously. Among the bandits who were caught or killed, were some Polish terrorists, whom we have definitely identified. Today we successfully discovered and executed one of the founders and leaders of a Jewish-Polish military organization.”

== Commemoration ==
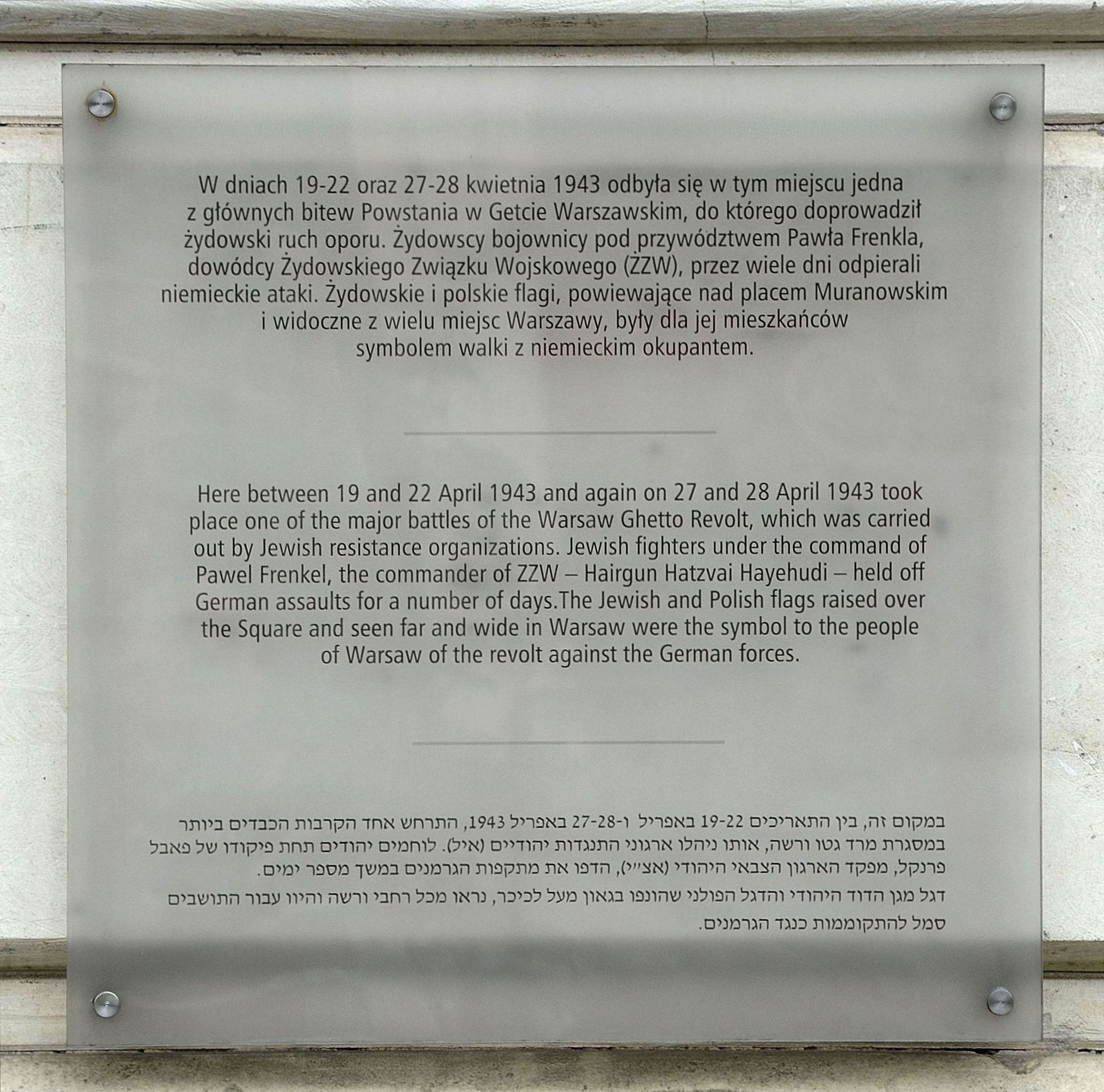
Commemorative plaque at 1 Muranowska Street in Warsaw

The battle is commemorated by the MSI (Municipal Information System) plaque on the building at 1 Muranowska Street.
