= Dawid Wdowiński =

Polish psychiatrist and resistance member (1895–1970)

David Wdowinski
- דוד וודובינסקי
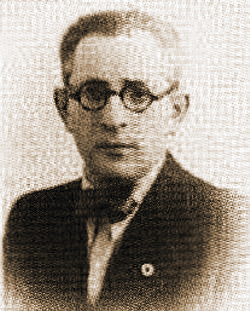
- Born: 1895; Będzin, Congress Poland, Russian Empire
- Died: 1970 (aged 74–75); Tel Aviv, Israel
- Occupations: Historian, author
- Writing career
- Notable work: And We Are Not Saved

Dawid (David) Wdowiński (Hebrew: דוד וודובינסקי; 1895–1970) was a psychiatrist and doctor of neurology in the Second Polish Republic. After the 1939 invasion of Poland by Nazi Germany, he became a political leader of the Jewish resistance organization called Żydowski Związek Wojskowy (Jewish Military Union, ŻZW) active before and during the Warsaw Ghetto Uprising.

== Early life ==
Dawid Wdowiński was born in 1895 in Będzin. He studied at universities in Vienna, Brno and Warsaw, and became a psychiatrist. Wdowiński was a member of the right-wing organization Hatzohar, which was founded in Paris in 1925.

Before World War II, Wdowiński gave up psychiatry through the influence of Ze'ev Jabotinsky, who urged him to devote himself fully to the cause of Revisionist Zionism. Wdowiński became a chairman of the Revisionist Zionist party called Polska Partia Syjonistyczna.

== World War II ==
In the summer of 1942, during the occupation of Poland, Wdowiński founded, along with many Jews from the Polish Army and Polish Jewish political leaders, the clandestine Jewish Military Union (ŻZW) in the Warsaw Ghetto. Some of the members of this group included Dawid Apfelbaum, Józef Celmajster, Henryk Lifszyc, Kałmen Mendelson, Paweł Frenkiel and Leon Rodl. Wdowiński was never a military commander, serving instead as political head of the ŻZW.

After the Warsaw Ghetto Uprising, Wdowiński was sent to various Nazi concentration camps, which he survived.

== Post-war ==
Cover of And We Are Not Saved by David Wdowinski

After the war, Wdowiński settled in the United States. Meanwhile, eyewitness accounts of the Warsaw Ghetto uprising were filtered through testimonies of former members of the left-leaning ŻOB. These accounts (also adopted by the postwar Polish Communist state) diminished both the roles and the importance of the ŻZW and Wdowiński. One such writer, Israel Gutman, was an activist in Hashomer Hatzair. Guttman's perspective continued in authoritative citations of Barbara Engelking and the Polish Center for Holocaust Research, who described Wdowiński as a senior activist in the Polish branch of Jabotinsky's New Zionist Organization; i.e. the "revisionist leader in the ghetto [who, in his memoir] attributes himself in command of the fighting organisation of this political movement." Another ŻOB fighter (Icchak Cukierman) wrote, "The Revisionists had seceded from the World Zionist Organization; and before the war, all socialist movements, including the Zionists, saw them as the Jewish embodiminent of Fascism." Wdowiński candidly noted the pro-Soviet political orientation of some leftist Jews following the Soviet invasion of Poland: "The second, the confused political orientation, was largely because many Jewish leaders were reared in the spirit of the Russian Revolution, and they thought they could translate the ideas of the class struggle into Zionist terms."

In 1961, Wdowiński served as a witness at the trial of Adolf Eichmann in Jerusalem.

The situation with the historical record led Wdowiński, in 1963, to publish his own memoir, And We Are Not Saved, in which he writes about his involvement with the ŻZW and the Warsaw Ghetto uprising. Wdowiński was fiercely opposed to Jewish collaboration with Germany inside the ghettos, or any post-war reconciliation with them. This theme pervades his memoirs as well as his correspondence.

== Death ==
Dawid Wdowiński died in 1970 after suffering a heart attack at a commemoration ceremony in Tel Aviv for the Warsaw Ghetto Uprising. He was buried in the Mount of Olives Jewish Cemetery.
