= Cezary Ketling-Szemley =

Polish military officer and lawyer (1915–1979)

- Born: Cezary Szemley; 22 July 1915 near Lviv, Kingdom of Galicia and Lodomeria, Austro-Hungary
- Died: 9 January 1979 (aged 63); Warsaw, Warsaw Voivodeship, Polish People's Republic
- Burial place: Northern Communal Cemetery
- Military career
- Allegiance: Polish Underground State
- Branch: PLAN; Home Army; Polish People's Army PAL
- Service years: 1939–1945
- Nicknames: Janusz, Ketling, Olgierd, Arpad
- Conflicts: Warsaw Uprising

Cezary Ketling-Szemley (22 July 1915 – 9 January 1979) was a Polish military officer and lawyer. He was a participant in the Polish resistance movement during the World War II, member of the PLAN, Home Army and PAL, main collaborator and supporter of the Jewish Military Union (ŻZW) on the part of the Polish underground during and before the Warsaw Ghetto Uprising. He was born as Cezary Szemley. During the war he used the aliases "Janusz", "Ketling", "Olgierd" and "Arpad". After the war, he signed himself Cezary Szemley-Ketling or Ketling-Szemley. In 1949, he officially changed his name to Janusz Ketling-Szemley.

Many details of Szemley's biography are unknown or unclear. What is known is that immediately after the start of the German occupation he joined the underground as a member of the Polish Popular Independence Action (PLAN) affiliated with the Alliance of Democrats party. After its destruction by the Germans, he founded a new organization of the same name, which soon joined the ZWZ-AK. As a member of the Home Army, he was twice sentenced to death by an underground court for collaboration with the Gestapo, but the sentence was not approved by the Home Army commander. In December 1942, he established contacts with the Jewish Military Union (ŻZW), which was forming in the ghetto, claiming to be a representative of the Polish underground state, for which he probably had no approval. He assisted the ŻZW with training, as well as by selling weapons and taking part in joint anti-German actions. He also supported the ŻZW during the ghetto uprising, helping some of the fighters escape from the ghetto.

He later became associated with the pro-communist and pro-Soviet Polish People's Army (PAL) and the Soviet-installed government of the PKWN. After the war, he worked as a lawyer.

== Biography ==
=== Prewar period ===
Szemley's origins and pre-war biography are unclear, as he himself provided false information about himself. After the war, he was for example giving Budapest as his place of birth, not wanting to write "born in the USSR". (Note: After World War II, "USSR" was added as the place of birth next to cities annexed by the Soviet Union, even in cases of people who were born long before that.) He also gave 22 July 1915, as a date of birth. In fact he was born near Lviv in the family of a railroad worker. Although there were claims that he came from an aristocratic family. According to another version, his father was said to have been the editor of the weekly Czarno na Białym, associated with the Alliance of Democrats, hence Szemley's later high position in this milieu.

He graduated from Cadet Corps No. 2 in Chełmno, and began studying law at the University of Lwów in 1935. In 1937, he studied at the Infantry Officer Cadet School in Ostrów Mazowiecka. Before the war, he worked at the Ministry of Justice, in the statistics department. It's possible that his patron was Count Jan Szembek, vice-minister of foreign affairs. He was an activist in the centrist Alliance of Democrats.

=== Conspiracy and the establishment of PLAN ===
He took part in the defence of Poland during the German invasion. Right after Polish defeat he became involved with the Polish resistance, and joined the secret Polish Popular Independence Action (PLAN). PLAN was founded 15 October 1939, as an organization of leftist patriotic youth, drawn from the pre-war Union of Polish Democratic Youth (ZPMD), students gathered around the magazine Orka na ugorze and scouts of the 23rd Warsaw Scouting Troop of Bolesław Chrobry. The PLAN commander was Jerzy Drewnowski, his deputy Juliusz Dąbrowski, and the writer Gustaw Herling-Grudziński was the first chief of staff. As early as October, PLAN started publishing the magazine Biuletyn Polski, Szemley was on the editorial team from the beginning. The PLAN's activities were wide-ranging, the precursor actions to minor sabotage were of great significance, including the spreading of anti-German stickers.

The PLAN was broken up by the Gestapo in January 1940. PLAN founders and most members were arrested. In its place, Szemley co-founded a new organisation under the same name, which is often referred to in historiography as PLAN II for this reason. It is not clear when PLAN II started its activities, various dates appear in the memoirs: March 1940, autumn 1940 or early 1941. Apart from the name and a general democratic profile, the new organisation had little in common with its predecessor. It was not a youth organisation anymore, but a political group based on former members of the Alliance of Democrats. It was also smaller in number, most PLAN members who escaped arrest did not join the new organisation. Wacław Barcikowski became the chairman, Stanisław Janusz was the military commander. PLAN II published the magazine Rzeczpospolita (lit. 'Commonwealth') from January 1941, which from 1944 began to be published under the new title Rzeczpospolita Ludowa (lit. 'People's Commonwealth'). Szemley himself was involved in the publication of another PLAN II magazine called Z dnia na dzień (lit. 'From Day to Day'), published several times a week during the years 1941–42.

=== In the Home Army ===
In September 1941, the PLAN subordinated itself to the ZWZ (later Home Army, AK). Since February 1943 Szemley commanded a 30-man platoon organised by the PLAN II (codename DB-3), which became part of the AK Kedyw company for Warsaw district of Śródmieście. The main reason for entrusting him with the command of a unit within the AK was Szemley's contacts with the Jewish Military Union (ŻZW), which was important in the context of the armed action of the Jewish fighters in the ghetto, already expected at that time. In June 1943 he was awarded the Cross of Valour by the Home Army Commander. Szemley was also a member of the Commission for the Organization of Propaganda at the Bureau of Information and Propaganda of the Home Army Headquarters. The Bureau of Information and Propaganda (BIP) was an underground cell in which many Alliance of Democrats activists worked, led by the Jerzy Makowiecki "Malicki", who was also the secretary general of the underground Alliance of Democrats. At the time, Makowiecki, through his subordinate Henryk Woliński, established contacts with the Jewish Combat Organization (ŻOB) and Jewish National Committee (ŻKN) and directed the work of the Council to Aid Jews Żegota. He was one of the most committed people in the Home Army to helping Jews. Initially he supported Szemley, but over time became suspicious of him. This was influenced by Szemley's insubordination and the suspicion falling on him, on 9 October 1942, Makowiecki voiced opinion about him: "I consider Arpad [Szemley] to be a complete psychopath".

==== Death sentence ====
In late 1942 and early 1943, the underground judiciary pursued a case against Szemley, who was accused of having treacherous contacts with the Gestapo. The case ended in a death sentence, which was not one approved by the Home Army Commander. According to historian August Grabski, Szemley was most likely the target of a political provocation organised by right-wing circles inside the Home Army who accused Szemley of having a 'pro-Communist' stance. However, according to historians Dariusz Libionka and Laurence Wainbaum, there is no reason to believe it was a provocation and the allegations against Szemley were most likely true and evidenced.

The whole affair started when PLAN II activist Tadeusz Szurmak was arrested by the Germans on 22 June 1942. In late August and early September 1942, the Home Army underground intercepted two anonymous letters sent to the Gestapo by some PLAN II activists, in which the latter offered to hand over leading activists of the Polish Underground State in exchange for Szurmak's release. In doing so, he also gave out a lot of confidential information about Z dnia na dzień and its editorial staff in order to make himself credible to the Germans. The evidence against Szemley in this case was gathered on 18 October 1942. The hearing revisited the earlier situation that brought Szemley before the Civil Court. Namely, in March 1942, he had extorted $6,000 from Jewish counterfeiters by claiming to be a Gestapo officer. This type of practice was considered reprehensible, as it was very often used by szmalcowniks. On 21 February 1943, the Second Special Military Court of the AK Headquarters sentenced Szemley in absentia to death. This sentence was upheld at a subsequent trial on 24–25 May 1943. However, it was not approved by Home Army Commander, General Stefan Rowecki. Despite this, on 21 January 1944, at the corner of Nowogrodzka and Emilia Plater Streets in Warsaw, Szemley was severely wounded in the back by his AK-aligned enemies attempting to liquidate him.

At the turn of 1942 and 1943, Szemley was, in the eyes of the decision-makers of the Polish Underground State, a completely discredited and untrustworthy person. On 31 March 1943, the head of AK counterintelligence Bernard Zakrzewski "Oskar" wrote to the deputy AK commander Tadeusz Komorowski "Korczak":

He is a morbidly ambitious individual, quite intelligent, vindictive, spiteful, without a moral spine and without ethical brakes. [...] a mannered type, with inclinations for a insider in politics and organisational life, a snitch in private and commercial life. His morale and attitude do not inspire confidence, his ambition, passion and vindictiveness in a difficult situation may even lead him to the worst

=== Cooperation with ŻZW ===
==== Establishment of cooperation ====
Szemley made his first contacts with the Jewish Military Union (ŻZW) in December 1942, as the ŻZW sought to establish relations with the Government Delegation and the Home Army. The meeting took place on the grounds of the Bródno cemetery, and was most likely attended by ŻZW commander Paweł Frenkel. Next Szemley went to the ghetto in January 1943, passing through a tunnel under Muranowska Street. It wasn't the first time Szemley went to ghetto, as underground court documents contain information about Szemley's attack on Jewish dollar counterfeiters, during which he claimed to be a Gestapo man and took 60,000 złotys from them. In his account given to the Israeli historian Chaim Lazar, Szemley mentions 'sporadic' contacts between him and the ŻZW in the earlier period, since 1940, but this is unlikely. Szemley also credits the idea of building the tunnel, which is equally unlikely. However, the accounts of aid to Jews in hiding undertaken by PLAN II are most likely true.

Szemley's disastrous reputation was probably the reason why the ŻZW's attempt to contact the Polish underground did not find much response. Attempts at contact made at around the same time by the ŻOB, which was initially mediated by Aleksander Kamiński "Hubert", who had an impeccable reputation, were on the other hand successful. Szemley's contacts with some Jewish groups in the ghetto were known about in the underground leadership, but were ignored as another Szemley hoax. The existence of a revisionist zionist resistance movement was also not mentioned by the ŻOB envoys, which further weakened the credibility of the ŻZW and Szemley in the eyes of the Polish underground leadership. On the other hand, the ŻZW may have been convinced that it had established contacts with an important representative of the Polish underground, especially as Szemley was able to provide significant training and material assistance and to give the impression of being an important person.

It is unclear how many weapons and of what type Szemley transferred to the ŻZW. During the second trial against Szemley, an accusation was made against him that he sold entrusted service weapons and ammunition to Jews in the ghetto and took the money for himself. Witness testimony also includes information that he sold 3,800 rounds of ammunition to the ghetto. He himself denied it, claiming that he only delivered Molotov cocktails.

==== Joint combat actions ====
From January 1943, according to Szemley's own account, a period of lively cooperation between PLAN II and the ŻZW begins. Already in the self-defence action of January 1943, PLAN II soldier Kazimierz Lipka "Śmiały", took part. Joint activities are known from documents of the ŻZW provided to historian Bernard Marek by Szemley himself, not always confirmed by other sources. On 11 February 1943, PLAN II soldiers killed one SS man in the ghetto near the Nalewski Street. A day later, ŻZW soldiers took part with PLAN II in an anti-German action in Marki. On 18 February 1943, two German gendarmes were killed in a joint action in the ghetto.

On 21 February, the ŻZW carried out an assassination attempt on German informers Lolek Skosowski, Paweł Włodowski, Arek Wajntraub, H. Mangiel and Lidia Radziejowska in the ghetto at Świętojerska Street 38. The operation was commanded by Paweł Frenkel. According to an account written down in June 1943 by Paweł Besztymt "Rudy Paweł", a member of the ŻZW, the action was originally supposed to be carried out by a group of "12 Aryans" and the ŻZW would only take care of conducting intelligence prior to the action, but in the end, out of fear of unmasking, the assassination was carried out by a group of 8 members of the ŻZW. Skosowski, as one of Abraham Gancwajch's main collaborators and previously a member of the collaborationist Group 13, was the main target of the attack, but was only wounded. The whole situation is unclear, as Skosowski had established cooperation with the Government Delegation in 1942, and was a useful double agent. Perhaps his assassination was ordered by the Polish underground, or perhaps Szemley acted on his own in order to lend credibility to the trial against him. Later Frenkel and Szemley jointly commanded the operation to set fire to the police and SS warehouses on Nalewki 3.

==== Ghetto uprising ====
PLAN II soldiers and Szemley himself took part in helping Jews fighting in the Warsaw Ghetto Uprising. On 19 April they attempted to blow up the ghetto wall from the side of Bonifraterska Street. And on 23 April they carried out an attack on a German post at the corner of Okopowa and Dzika Streets. Szemley himself claimed in his account to Lazar that he and other PLAN II soldiers had taken part in the ŻZW fighting on Muranowska Street, shelling German positions from outside the ghetto.

Szemley also helped lead ŻZW fighters out of the ghetto. According to his account, he led out 500 people, which is undoubtedly an exaggeration. In fact through a tunnel under Muranowska Street on 22 April or later, a group of 30 or 44 people left the ghetto and made their way to Michalin (now part of Józefów), near Otwock. Most accounts agree that the transport took place in coffins, and that the group in Michalin, as a result of its exposure, was attacked by the Germans. The ŻZW received outside help from Polish conspirators, but it is not clear from which organisation. According to the accounts (first described by Bernard Mark) of the soldiers of the Security Corps organisation, they played the main role. Szemley polemicised this version by claiming that it was PLAN II that helped the ŻZW:

As a matter of fact, the villa in Michalin, in the Błota colony, was rented a few weeks before the uprising by Colonel Mąk-Piątkowski, a member of the Alliance of Democrats, and also my personal friend. In turn, they were transported by sub- cadet. Ryszard Więckowski, my direct subordinate who had nothing to do with KB. This group was deconspirated after the arrival as a result of not keeping the precautionary measures, and a part of it was killed, a part of it was directed, in agreement with me, to a partisan unit of PAL remaining under the command of Tadeusz Bilewicz, at present living in Falenica, ul. Artystyczna 6.

Another group was helped out through the sewers by PLAN II member and Szemley's subordinate Tadeusz Malinowski to 13 Grzybowska Street.

=== Polish People's Army ===
Later PLAN II broke its contacts with the Home Army, and its military units joined the Polish People's Army (PAL). PLAN II joined the Supreme People's Committee of the United Democratic and Socialist Parties (NKL, later CKL) in November 1943, and the Centralisation of Democratic, Socialist and Syndicalist Parties in February 1944. Szemley was an ardent supporter of the CKL's subordination to the Soviet-installed PKWN in Poland, which eventually happened.

=== After the war ===
After the war, Szemley finished his law studies at University of Warsaw. In 1948 he passed the bar exam, and in 1952 he received his doctorate at the Jagiellonian University. In the early 1950s he was removed from the United People's Party. He acted as attorney for Ludwik Kalkstein while he was serving his life sentence from 1953 to 1965. Kalkstein was convicted of being a Gestapo agent during the war responsible, among other things, for handing over Home Army commander General Stefan Rowecki to the Germans. In 1965, Szemley was arrested for transmitting material critical of communist Poland to Radio Free Europe. Later due to harassment, Szemley was unable to work as a lawyer, and died on 9 January 1979, in Warsaw.

== Writings ==
- Ketling-Szemley, Cezary (1956). "Rzecz o społeczeństwie". Kierunki (in Polish). 19: 10–11.
- Ketling-Szemley, Cezary (1957). "Sądy w czasie okupacji". Nowa Kultura (in Polish). 46: 23.
- Ketling-Szemley, Cezary (1958). "Wymiar sprawiedliwości w czasie okupacji". Stolica (in Polish). 13: 23.

== Bibliography ==
- Fogelzang-Adler, Ewa (2009). "Działalność wydawnicza Polskiej Ludowej Akcji Niepodległościowej (1939–1944)". AUPC Studia Ad Bibliothecarum Scientiam Pertinentia. 7: 184–199.
- Grabski, August (2007). "Czy Polacy walczyli w powstaniu w getcie? Rzecz o polskich sojusznikach Żydowskiego Związku Wojskowego". Kwartalnik Historii Żydów. 224 (4): 422–434.
- Grupińska, Anka; Choroszewski, Bartek (2003). "Sprawa michalińska. Opowieść o jednym epizodzie z dziejów Żydowskiego Związku Wojskowego". Teksty Drugie. 5: 171–177.
- Libionka, Dariusz; Weinbaum, Laurence (2011). Bohaterowie, hochsztaplerzy, opisywacze. Wokół Żydowskiego Związku Wojskowego [Heroes, hoaxers, descriptors. Around the Jewish Military Union] (in Polish). Warsaw: Stowarzyszenie Centrum Badań nad Zagładą Żydów. ISBN 978-83-932202-8-1.
