= Polish People's Army (disambiguation) =

Polish People's Army may refer to:

- Polish People's Army - an informal name for the Soviet controlled formation of the Polish Armed Forces in the East
- Polish People's Army PAL - a leftist underground anti-Nazi organization in German-occupied Poland.
