= Leon Rodal =

Polish journalist and activist

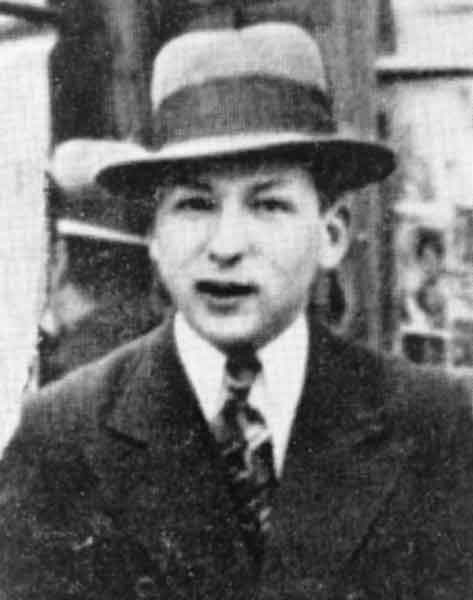
Leon Rodal

Leon Rodal (January 29, 1912 in Kielce – 6 May 1943, in Warsaw), also Arie or Lejb Rodal, was a Polish journalist, Zionist-Revisionist party activist, co-founder and one of the commanders of the Jewish Military Union. He participated and died in the Warsaw Ghetto Uprising.

== Biography ==
Rodal, also known under the names of Leib (in Yiddish) and Arie (in Hebrew), was a well-known journalist of the magazines Moment and Di Tat, writing in Yiddish, before the war. He was also an activist of the Zionist right-wing Zionists-Revisionists Party.

After the outbreak of the war, Rodal found himself in the Warsaw Ghetto, where in 1942 was one of the co-founders and commanders of the Jewish Military Union (ŻZW). In the Union, he was responsible for the information department, which prepared, printed and distributed newspapers, newsletters, posters as well as conducted radio eavesdropping. During the first days of the Warsaw Ghetto Uprising, Rodal fought in Muranów Square, defending the headquarters of ŻZW, located in the building at 7/9 Muranowska Street. During the Battle of Muranów Square, together with the military commander of ŻZW, Paweł Frenkel, Rodel broke the circle around insurgent positions, approached the position of collaborative Ukrainian formations and attacked them unexpectedly.

On 25 April 1943, after the collapse of the defense of Muranów Square, Rodal and his unit, commanded by Frenkel, broke out of the ghetto through an underground passage. The unit stayed in a previously prepared underground apartment at 11/13 Grzybowska Street. From there, ŻZW subunits set off for night operations in the burning ghetto, trying to save imprisoned civilians. The first operation was commanded by Leon Rodal, who led a group of civilians out of the ghetto on 5 May 1943. The next day Rodal's unit set off to evacuate the rest of the group they had met. On the way back, the unit fell into an ambush and was attacked by the SS and the Blue Police. Rodal died in battle with many members of his unit.

== Honours ==
On 9 November 2017, a street formerly named after Edward Fondamiński in the district of Śródmieście (New Town) in Warsaw was renamed Leon Rodal Street.
