= David J. Landau =

Polish WWII resistance fighter

David J. Landau (1920 – 1996), also known as Dudek, Janek and Jan, was a resistance fighter in the Warsaw Ghetto, Poland, in 1944. He is the author of a memoir, Caged (1999), about the wartime experiences of his compatriots.

== Life ==
Landau was born in Warsaw in 1920, into a wealthy Polish-Jewish family. Before World War II, he worked in the family furs business. After the German invasion of Poland Landau became a member of Polish Underground. He fought in the Warsaw Ghetto Uprising and was captured. Sent to extermination camp, Landau survived by jumping from the train.

After the war, Landau left Poland through Czechoslovakia, Germany and France and finally emigrated to Australia with his wife Luba in 1947. He ran a clothing business there, before turning to real estate. He died in 1996.

In 1999, the Landau family published the first edition of his memoir, Caged, written in the memory of wartime colleagues and those who did not survive but promised themselves: ‘Whoever survives owes it to us to tell the story.’ His writing was encouraged by others, and the work was completed just days before his passing. The second edition of Caged was published in 2000 by Pan Macmillan in Sydney, Australia.

Some writers on the Warsaw Ghetto Uprising, most notably Moshe Arens, accept Landau's book uncritically and treat it as an entirely reliable and accurate account of the struggle waged by the Jewish Military Union (ŻZW) (in whose ranks Landau claims to have fought). Historians, however, have raised questions about its credibility and dispute many of the author's claims. In June 2005, in a letter to the editor of the Israel daily Haaretz, Avraham Cykiert of Mulgrave, Australia claimed to have ghost written the book and said that Landau's daughter had "doctored" his manuscript.

== Reviews of Caged ==
Anna Punshon from Burnie Advocate wrote: "Caged is a testament to the bravery against the unimaginable evil and is one of better books I have read in a long time."

"David Landau, a Polish Jew, gives us a rare story of surviving the Holocaust. He was one of the few survivors who fought back against the Nazis. It is a story of a personal tragedy, but it’s also a tale of the resistance, courage and survival, told at a relentless pace..." — Abbey’s Books

Matt Condon wrote in The Sunday Herald, Sydney, on February 11, 2001: "The story of a great hero from WWII has finally emerged from the shadows."

== Bibliography ==
- David J. Landau, Caged: A Story of Jewish Resistance (Pan Macmillan Australia, 2000) ISBN 0-7329-1063-3
