= Jewish Military Organization =

The Jewish Military Organization was an outgrowth of the Betar movement in Nazi-occupied eastern Europe. After Menahem Begin fled to Soviet Union territory, Jewish veterans of the Polish Army and the National Military Organisation networked with Polish military officers to prepare for the insurgency against the Third German Reich. The military background of the organization was a useful attribute in an environment of tyranny and genocide. The Jewish Military Union, a branch of the Jewish Military Organization, was effective at fighting Axis forces in Warsaw, Poland.

== See also ==
- Jewish Military Union
- Jewish Combat Organization
