= Dawid Moryc Apfelbaum =

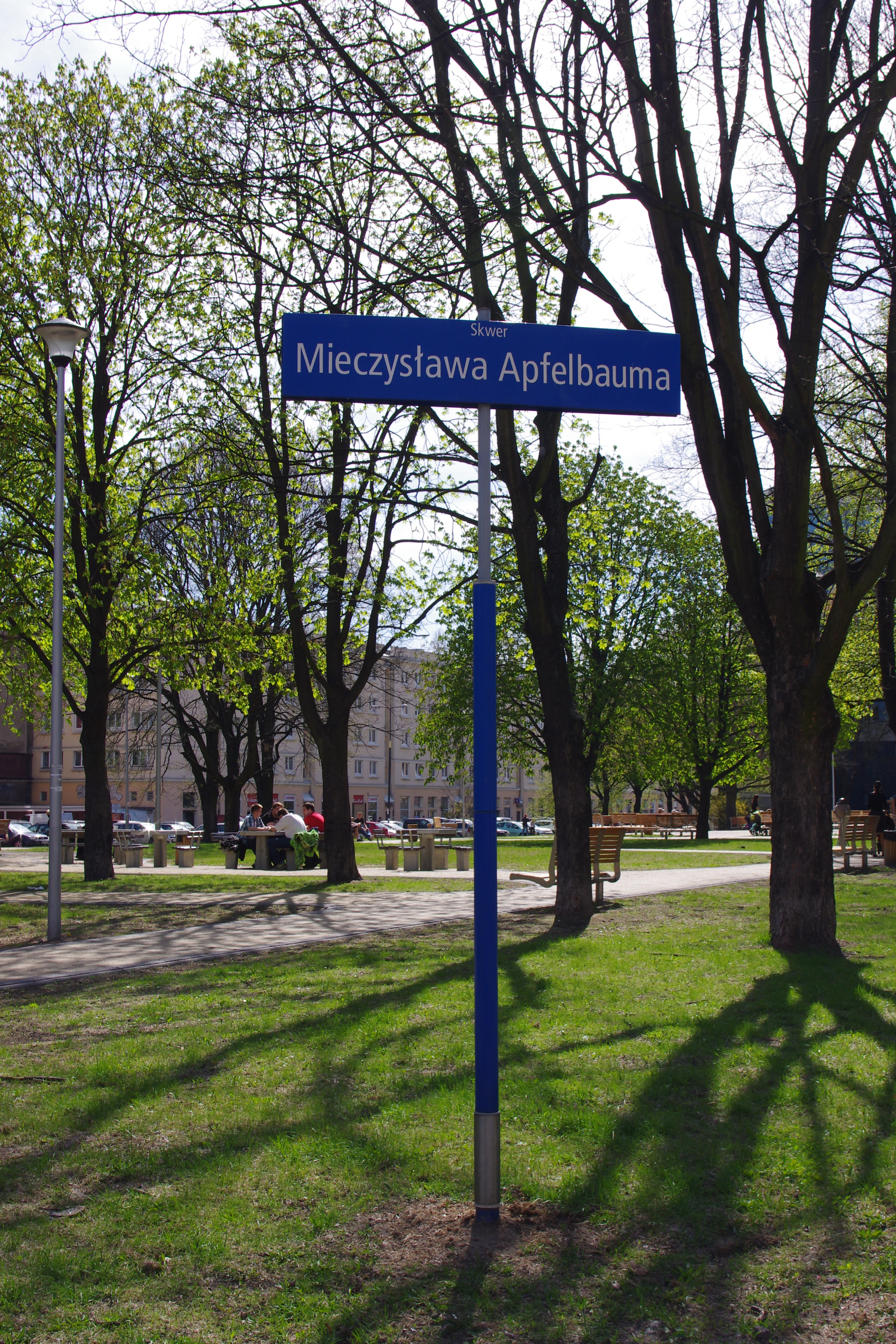
Street sign in Warsaw, Poland, in 2012, with the former name of Mieczysław Apfelbaum Square, currently known as the Rokhl Auerbakh Square.

Dawid Moryc Apfelbaum (Polish: [ˈda.vit ˈmɔr.ɘ̟t͡s apˈfɛl.bawm]; German: [ˈap͡fl̩ˌbaʊ̯m]), sometimes also known as Mieczysław Dawid Apfelbaum (Polish: [mjɛˈt͡ʂɘ̟.swaf ˈda.vit apˈfɛl.bawm]), is a disputed soldier who some contend was incorrectly credited as the commander of the Jewish Military Union that fought in the 1943 Warsaw Ghetto Uprising, during the Second World War. It is claimed that he died on 28 April 1943. Some allege he also served as a lieutenant of the Polish Armed Forces prior to the conflict.

Apfelbaum was first attested in 1948, in statements by Henryk Iwański, and later also mentioned by Tadeusz Bednarczyk, Władysław Zajdler, and Kałmen Mendelson, all of whom have claimed to have fought in the Warsaw Ghetto Uprising in 1943 under Apfelbaum's command, and to be members of the Polish Home Army. Their statements have been found by historians to be false, and their actual participation in the conflict, as well as the existence of Apfelbaum, was questioned.

== History ==
The existence of Dawid Moryc Apfelbaum, sometimes also called Mieczysław Dawid Apfelbaum, was first attested in 1948 by Henryk Iwański. Apfelbaum was also later mentioned in stories told by Tadeusz Bednarczyk, Władysław Zajdler, and Kałmen Mendelson. All of them claimed to have fought in the Warsaw Ghetto Uprising in 1943, and to be members of the Home Army. Their statements had been found to differ in details, to have changed over the years, making claims not attested to anywhere else, leading some historians to doubt the existence of Apfelbaum.

According to the first statement given by Iwański in 1948, Apfelbaum was one of the Jewish insurgents fighting in the Warsaw Ghetto Uprising in 1943. However, later, in the late 1950s, and early 1960s, he began being shown as a lieutenant of the Polish Armed Forces, as well as the creator and commander of the Jewish Military Union during the uprising. In contrast, currently it is believed that said accomplishments should be credited to Paweł Frenkiel instead. In various statements, they also described Apfelbaum's death due to wounds he would have suffered during a skirmish at Muranowska Street on 28 April 1943, in the first days of the uprising. Apfelbaum was also described to use pseudonyms Jabłoński, Kowal (meaning smith), and Mietek.

In 1962 Iwański told a story about Apfelbaum to journalist Chai Lazar, who then published it in Israel. It contributed to its spread in historical sources, where he was credited as a historical figure and creator of the Jewish Military Union. However, there are no sources that would prove that Apfelbaum was ever a member of Polish military prior to the war, nor that he ever lived in Warsaw. In 1963, Apfelbaum was awarded posthumously the Third-Class Order of the Cross of Grunwald.

In 2011, historians Dariusz Libionka and Laurence Weinbaum published a book titled Bohaterowie, hosztaplerzy, opisywacze. Wokół Żydowskiego Związku Wojskowego (Heroes, grifters, describers. Around the Jewish Military Union), in which they argued that Apfelbaum did not exist, and was fabricated by Iwański, Bednarczyk, and others for personal gain.

== Commemorations ==
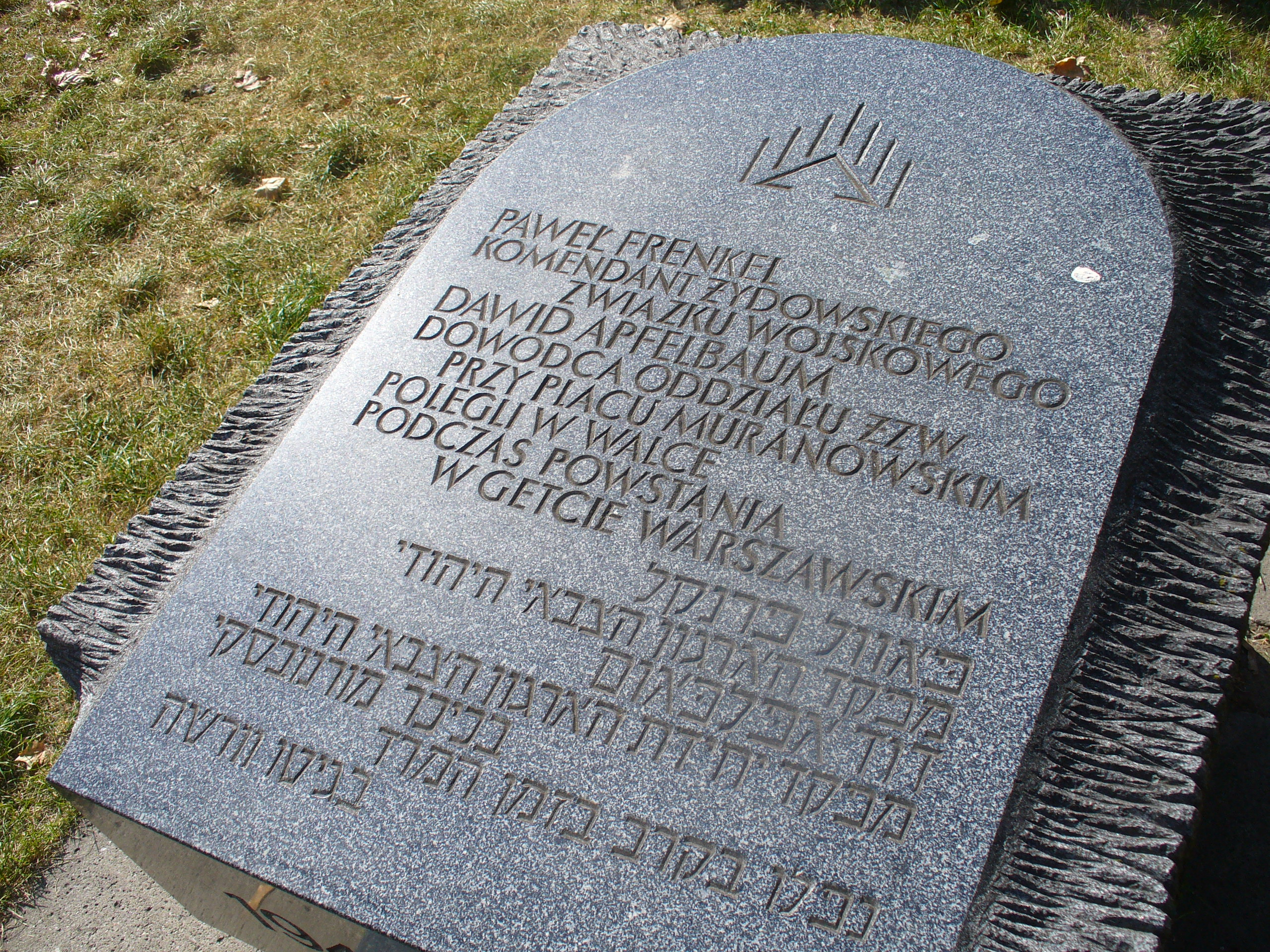
The inscription dedicated to Paweł Frenkiel and Dawid Apfelbaum on one of the sculptures of the Memorial Route of Jewish Martyrdom and Struggle, located at the Dubois Street in Warsaw, Poland.

In 1997, Apfelbaum was commemorated together with Paweł Frenkiel, with an inscription in a stone sculpture near Dubois Street, as part of the Memorial Route of Jewish Martyrdom and Struggle installation located in the city of Warsaw, Poland, in the Downtown district. The inscription, translated to English, reads: "Paweł Frenkel, commander of the Jewish Military Union; Dawid Apfelbaum, squad commander of the Jewish Military Union stationed near the Muranów Square; Killed in action in the Warsaw Ghetto Uprising".

On 24 March 2004, a garden square, situated between Smocza Street, Pawia Street, and Dzielna Street, located within the district of Wola in Warsaw, was named Mieczysław Apfelbaum Square (Polish: Skwer Mieczysława Apfelbauma), in his commemoration. At the time, he was still assumed to be commander of the Jewish Military Union. It was originally proposed by the Warsaw-based Jewish Historical Institute, which wanted a square near the Pawiak Prison Museum, to commemorate a person associated with the Jewish Military Union. It listed Apfelbaum as one of the potential candidates, whom was eventually chosen by the city, due to his, alleged at the time, status of the leader of the organisation. In 2012, its name was modified to Mieczysław Dawid Apfelbaum Square (Polish: skwer Mieczysława Dawida Apfelbauma).

In 2022, the Jewish Historical Institute begun collecting signatures on a petition to rename the square in honor of writer Rokhl Auerbakh, argumenting that Apfelbaum was fictional. In June 2023, the members of the Warsaw City Council voted unilaterally to change the name, which came in effect in September 2023, to Rokhl Auerbakh Square (Polish: skwer Racheli Auerbach).
