= Paweł Frenkiel =

Jewish resistance member

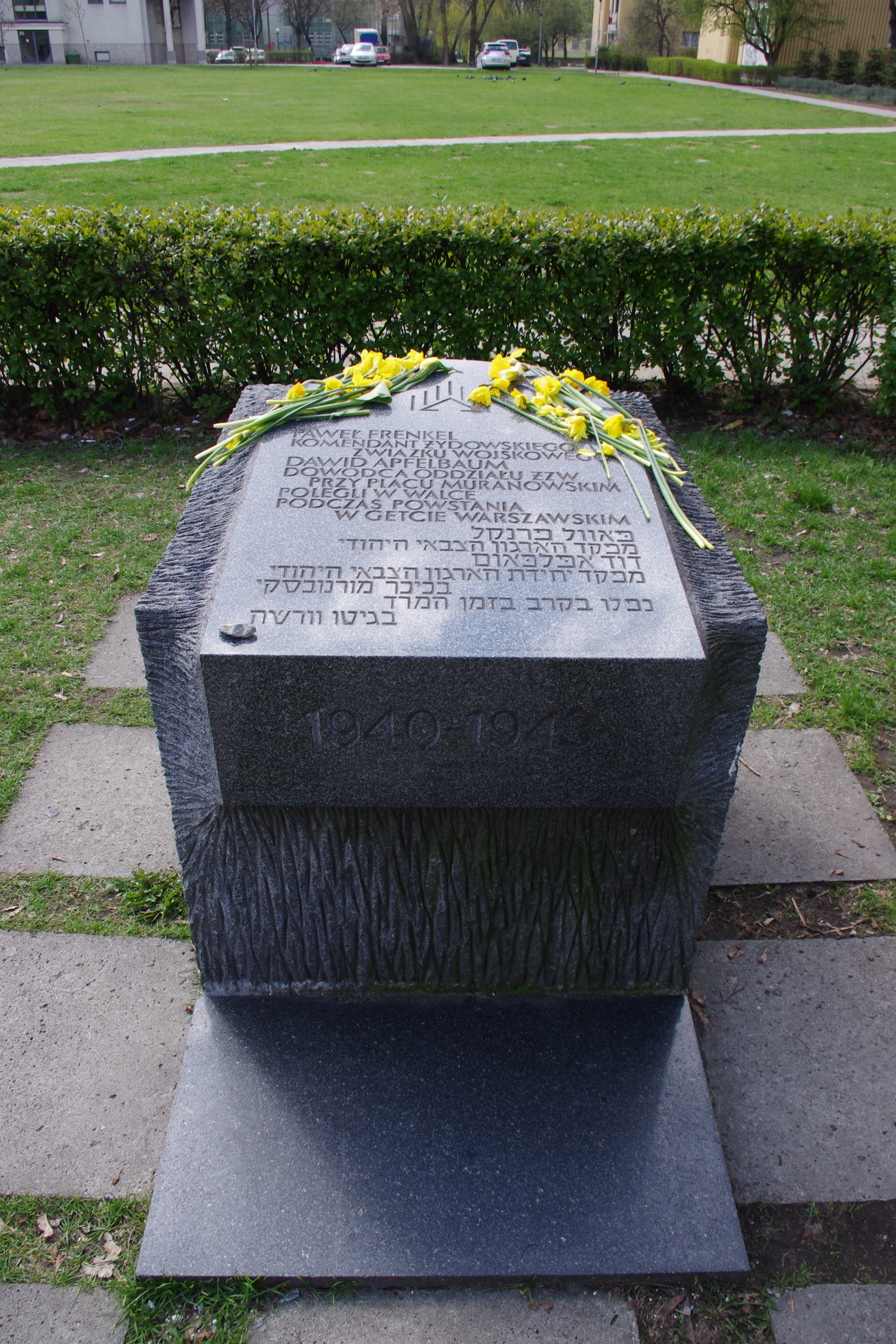
A memorial stone for the leaders of ŻZW in the Warsaw Ghetto on ul. Dubois (Dubois Street) in Warsaw. (Part of the Memorial Route of Jewish Martyrdom and Struggle in Warsaw)

Paweł Frenkiel (sometimes also Frenkel, Hebrew: פאוול פרנקל; ?–1943) was a Polish Army officer and a Jewish youth leader in Warsaw and one of the senior commanders of the Jewish Military Union, or the ŻZW. Although one of the most important leaders of the Warsaw Ghetto Uprising and the Jewish resistance in the months preceding April 1943, Frenkiel is also one of the least well known to historians. The name Paweł is believed to have been a codename. His actual name, early life, and ultimate fate are a subject of some controversy.

== Uprising ==
Following the outbreak of World War II, German conquest of Poland and the start of German repressions against the Jewish population of Poland, he joined the Jewish Military Union and became one of its highest-ranking members. It is unclear what his exact capacity was. Earlier publications and accounts by Tadeusz Bednarczyk, Henryk Iwański and Kałmen Mendelson assert, that Paweł Frenkel was one of the deputies of JMU's commander Dawid Moryc Apfelbaum. However, other accounts, including those by Dawid Wdowiński and Cezary Ketling-Szemley, suggest that Frenkiel was indeed the leader of the entire organisation. In recent years historians have suggested that Apfelbaum did not even exist at all.

In either case, it is probable that Frenkiel personally commanded one of the companies of armed fighters during the Warsaw Ghetto Uprising of 1943. According to a widespread opinion he was killed in action while defending the headquarters of the Jewish Military Union at #7 Muranów Square. According to some other sources he was killed on 19 June 1943 in Grzybowska Street in Warsaw.

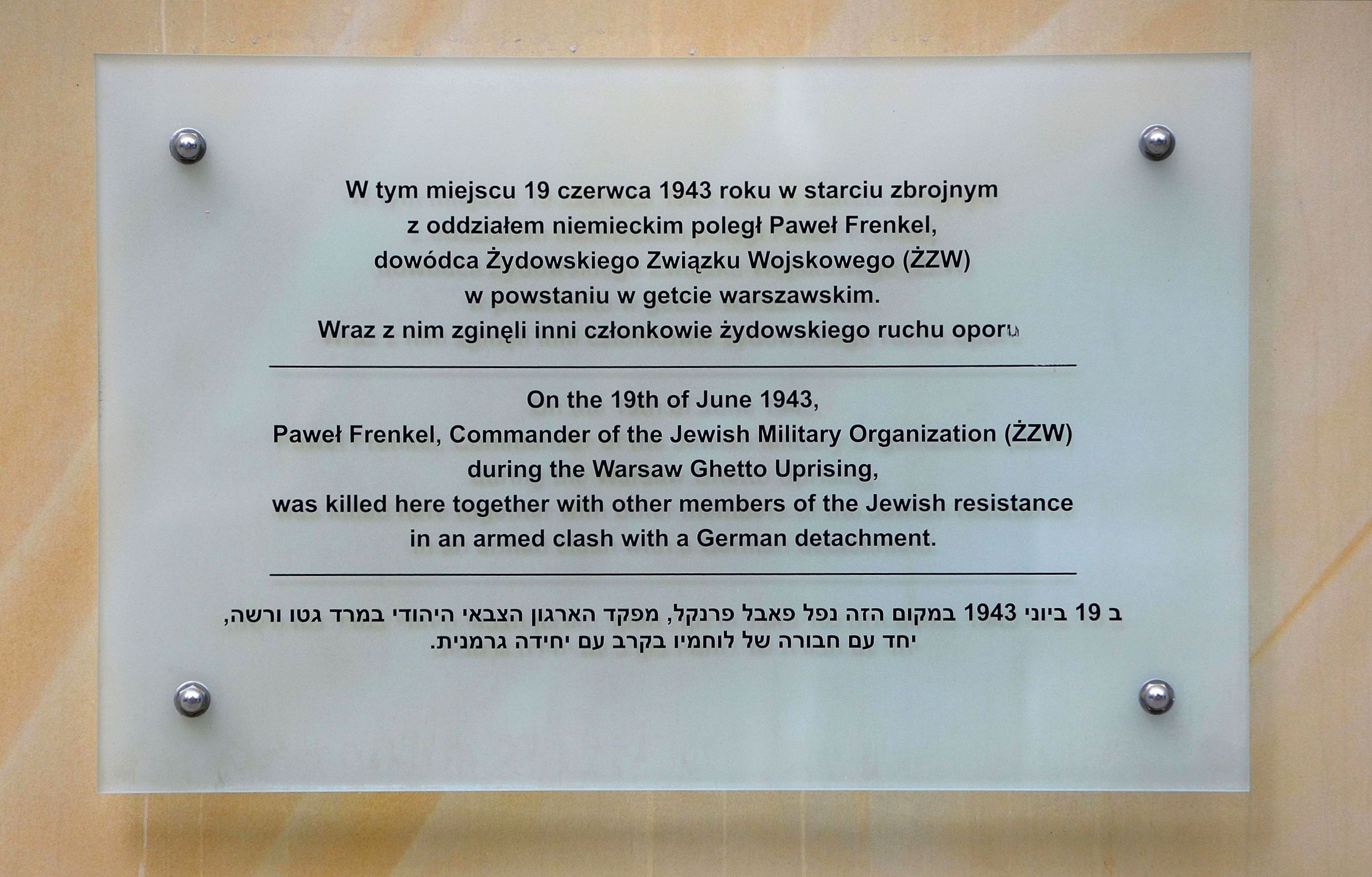
A plaque in memory of Paweł Frenkel at 5A Grzybowska Street in Warsaw

== Identity ==
The true identity of Paweł Frenkiel is not known for certain, as it is thought that the name "Paweł" was a codename. He has long been considered an enigma by historians. Although his alleged counterpart, Dawid Moryc Apfelbaum, is now believed to have been entirely fictional, Frenkiel was mentioned by survivors. In 2009, police artist Gil Gibli created a composite sketch of his appearance based on the three survivors' testimonies. Fellow ŻZW commander Dawid Wdowiński claimed that Frenkiel had been a member of the Revisionist Zionist movement Betar, participated in Betar's military training program before the war, served in the Polish Army, and had seen action in the 1939 German invasion of Poland, but could provide few other details. He described him as handsome and charismatic. Cezary Ketling-Szemley, a Polish underground contact of the ŻZW, wrote that Frenkiel and all the other ŻZW commanders he met did not look to be over 30 and that they had undergone military training in Mandatory Palestine. Encyklopedia Powszechna PWN wrote that Frenkiel was born in Warsaw, Poland, and joined Betar at the age of 18.

In 2023, researchers at the Menachem Begin Heritage Center identified him as Yaakov Frenkiel based on a letter by Jeremiah Halpern in which he claimed to have known Commander Frenkiel of the Warsaw Ghetto well, and that he had been his apprentice at the Betar Naval Academy in Italy during the 1930s. Although Halpern did not mention his first name, stating only that Paweł was not his real name, a search of the list of cadets from that academy identified only one person with the name "Frenkiel" there, which was Yaakov Frenkiel. Further research uncovered additional details of Yaakov Frenkiel's life. He was born in Białystok on 2 August 1911. He studied medicine at the University of Strasbourg but dropped out after three semesters and joined the Polish Army in 1931, becoming a Second Lieutenant. In 1934, he became the Białystok commander of Brit HaHayal, a Revisionist Zionist association of Polish Jewish soldiers, and trained young Betar members in military skills. In 1937, he visited Mandatory Palestine as part of a voyage on the Betar training ship Sarah A and extensively toured the land, even appearing in a newsreel. An anecdote from Zvi Keinan, who would later become an Israeli Navy officer, recalled that he was always the referee in boxing drills on the Sarah A as part of self-defense training. Frenkiel saw action during the German invasion of Poland in 1939. He would have been 32 when he was killed in battle in the Warsaw Ghetto.

However, this account is not accepted by all. A Tel Aviv University doctoral student identified the figure of Paweł Frenkiel as a Betar activist named Avraham Frenkiel.
