= Józef Celmajster =

Polish physician

Józef Celmajster (later Józef Niemirski) (27 December 1901 - 7 December 1968) was a Polish physician of Jewish descent. He was a first lieutenant in the Polish Army, and the chief of the medical department of the Jewish Military Union (ŻZW) in the Warsaw Ghetto and OW-KB.

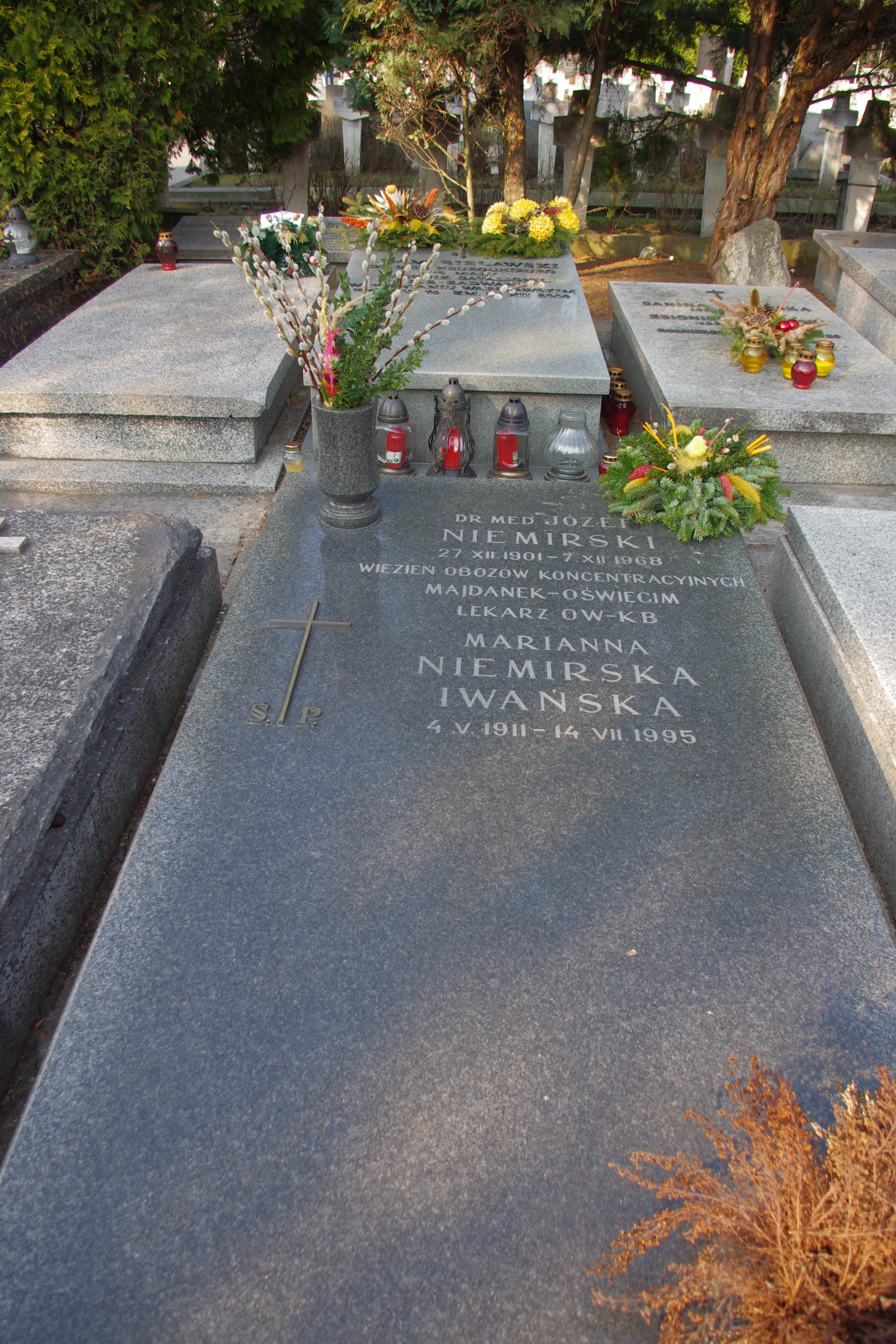
Tombstone of Józef Celmajster in the Powązki Military Cemetery

Celmajster, a graduate of the University of Wilno, participated in the 1939 Defensive War and the Warsaw Ghetto Uprising. He was later deported to Auschwitz, but survived the war.

After World War II he worked as physician. He died in Warsaw on 7 December 1968.

== Military decorations ==
- Polonia Restituta
