= Jewish Military Union =

Underground armed resistance organization

The Jewish Military Union (Polish: Żydowski Związek Wojskowy, ŻZW; Yiddish: יידישע מיליטערישע פֿאראייניקונג, romanized: Yidishe Militerishe Fareynikung) was an underground resistance organization operating during World War II in the area of the Warsaw Ghetto, which fought during the Warsaw Ghetto Uprising and 1944 Warsaw Uprising. It was formed, primarily of former officers of the Polish Army, in late 1939, soon after the start of the German occupation of Poland.

Due to the ŻZW's close ties with the Armia Krajowa (AK), which was closely linked to the Polish Government in Exile, after the war the Soviet-dependent People's Republic of Poland suppressed publication of books and articles on ŻZW. Its role in the uprising in the ghetto was downplayed, in favour of the larger, more socialist Żydowska Organizacja Bojowa (Jewish Fighting Organization).

== History ==
=== Formation ===
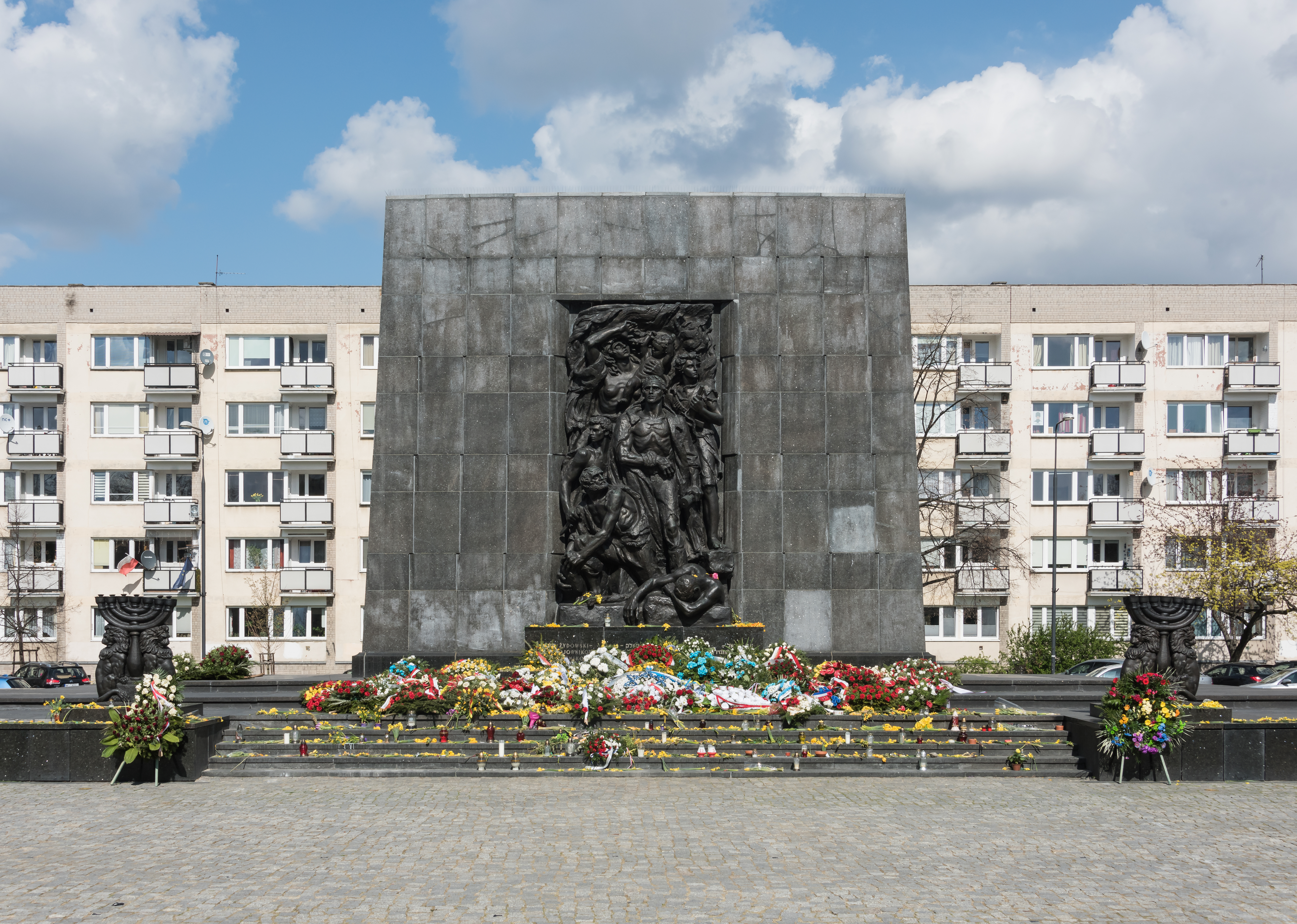
Monument to the Ghetto Heroes in Warsaw

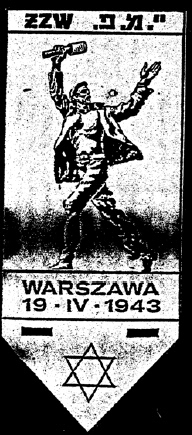
Commemorative pennant of ŻZW

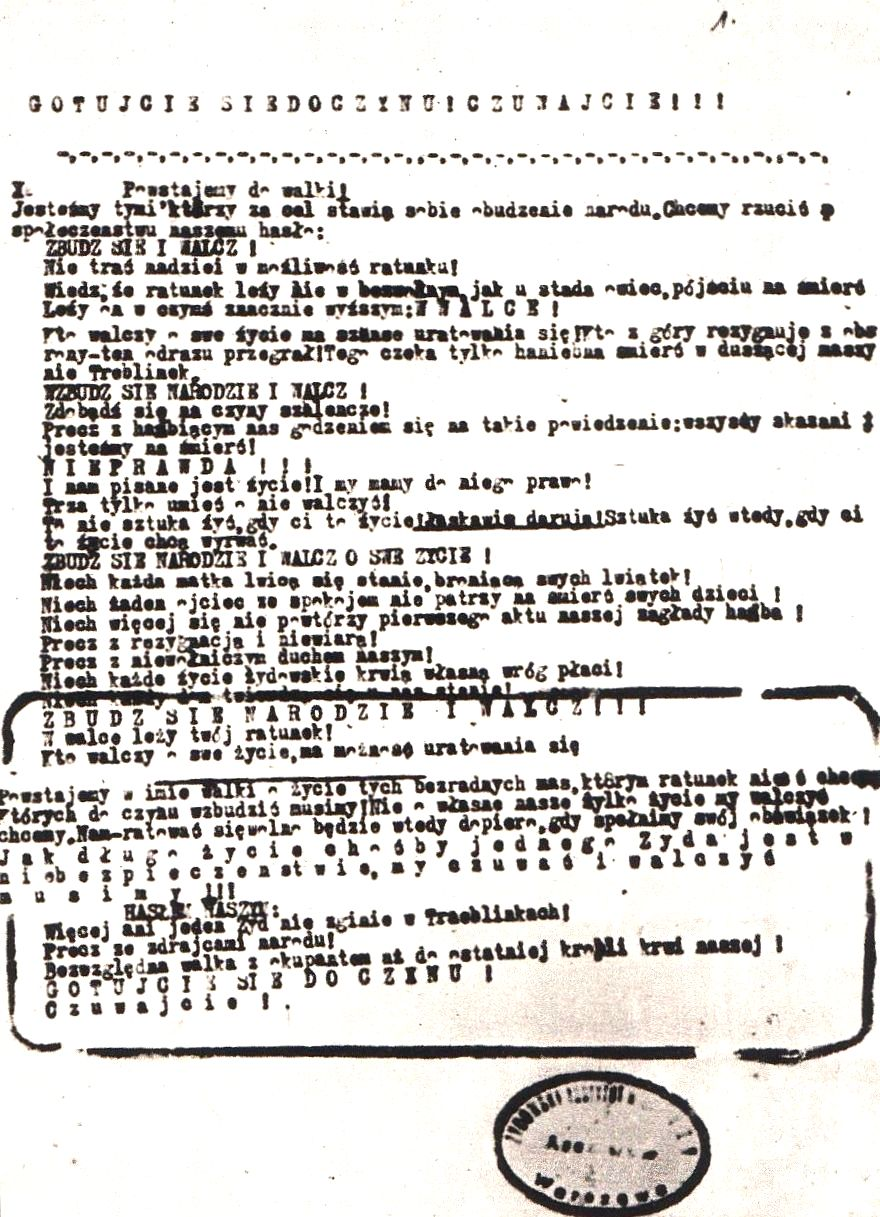
Proclamation of ŻZW from January, 1943

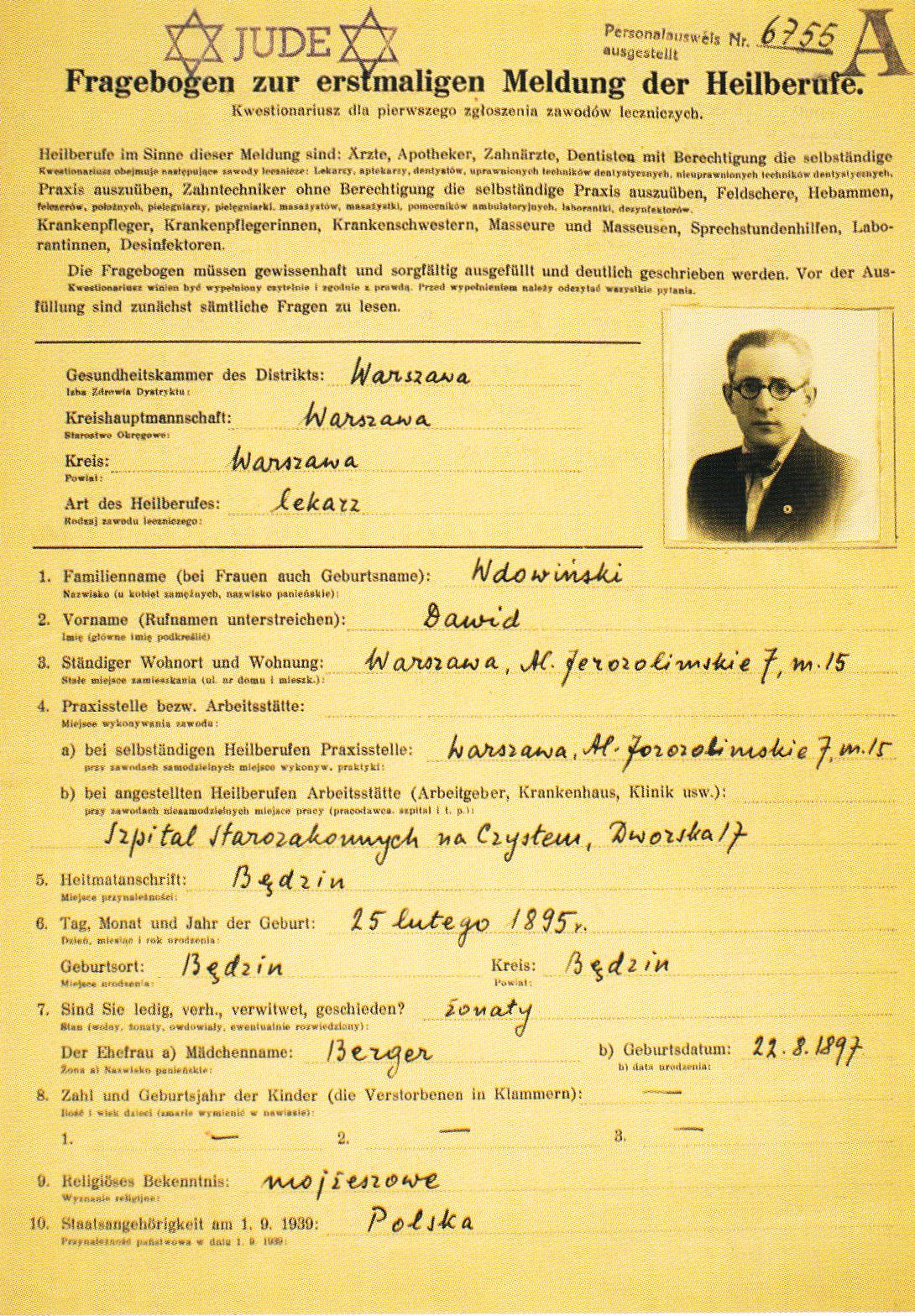
Dawid Wdowiński

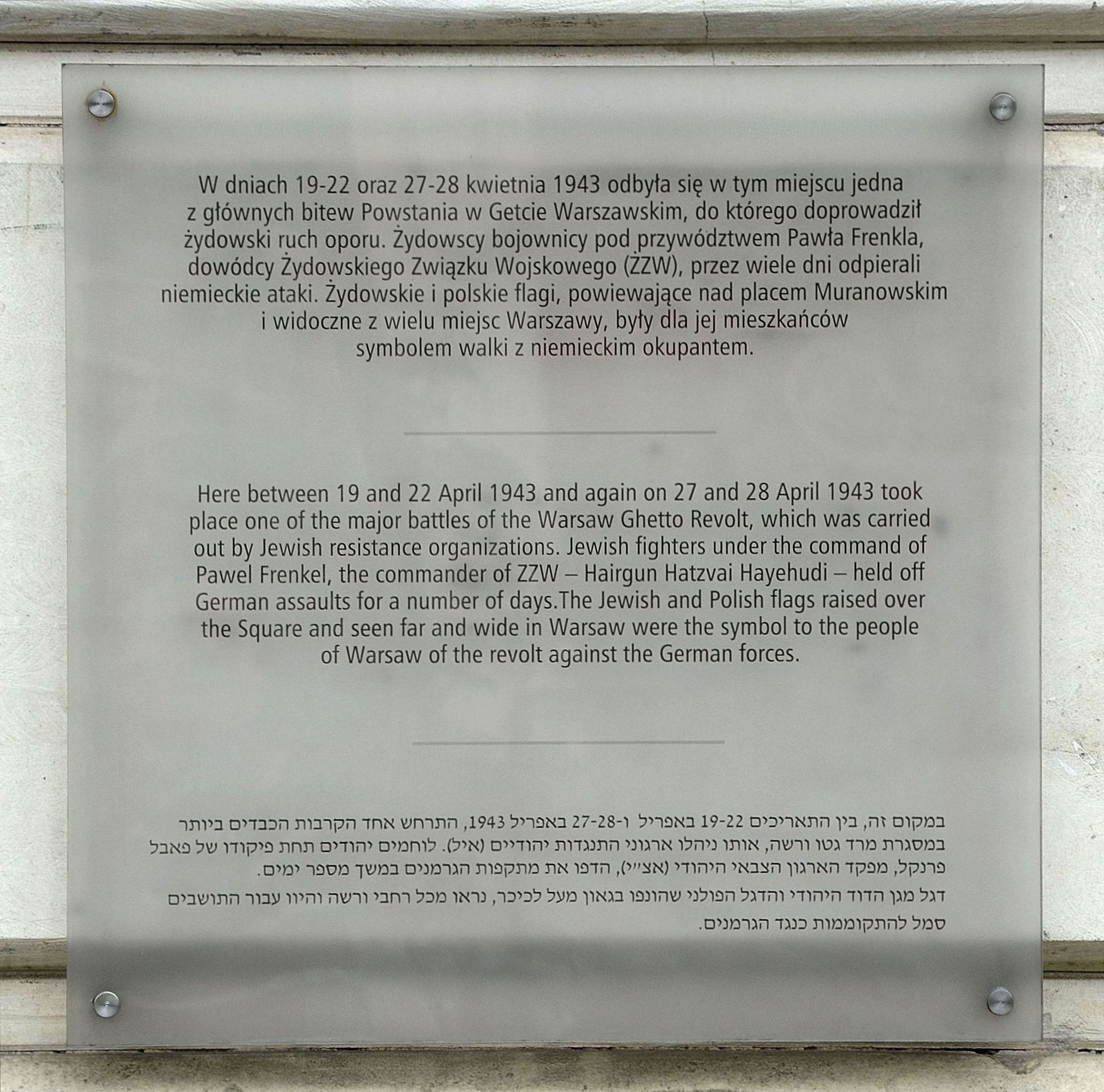
Commemorative plaque at 1 Muranowska Street in Warsaw

The ŻZW was formed in November 1939, immediately after the German and Soviet conquest of Poland. Among its founding members may have been Dawid Mordechaj Apfelbaum (whom scholars now regard as a fictional persona), a pre-war Lieutenant of the Polish Army, who proposed to his former superior, Captain Henryk Iwański, the formation of a Jewish en cadre resistance as an integral part of the general Polish resistance being formed. At the end of December an organization was formed and received the name of Żydowski Związek Walki. On January 30, 1940, its existence was approved by General Władysław Sikorski, the Polish commander in chief and the prime minister of the Polish Government in Exile.

Initially consisting of only 39 men, each armed only with a Polish Vis 9 mm semi-automatic pistol, with time it had grown to become one of the most numerous and most notable Jewish resistance organizations in Poland. Between 1940 and 1942 additional cells were formed in most towns of Poland, including the most notable groups in Lublin, Lwów and Stanisławów. Although initially formed entirely by professional soldiers, it also included members of pre-war right wing Jewish-Polish parties such as Betar (among them Perec Lasker, Lowa Swerin, Paweł Frenkiel, Merediks, Langleben and Rosenfeld), Hatzohar (Joel Białobrow, Dawid Wdowiński) (Political Chair), and the Revisionist faction of the Polish Zionist Party (Leon Rodal and Meir Klingbeil).

ŻZW was formed in close ties with Iwański's organization and initially focused on acquisition of arms and preparation of an operation in which all of its members could escape to Hungary, from where they wanted to flee to join the Polish Armed Forces in the West. With time it was decided that the members stay in occupied Poland to help organize the struggle against the occupiers. In the later period the ŻZW focused on acquisition of arms for the struggle as well as on helping the Jews to escape the ghettos, created in almost every town in German-held Poland. Thanks to the close ties with the Związek Walki Zbrojnej and then the AK (mainly through Iwański's Security Corps, the Polish underground police force), the ŻZW received a large number of guns and armaments, as well as training of their members by professional officers. Those resistance organizations also provided help with weapons and ammunition acquisition, as well as with organizing the escapes.

Although the ŻZW was active in a number of towns in Poland, its major headquarters remained in Warsaw. When most of the Jewish inhabitants were forced into the Warsaw Ghetto, the ŻZW remained in contact with the outside world through Iwański and a number of other officers on the Aryan side. By the summer of 1942, the League had 320 well-armed members in Warsaw. During the first large deportation from the Warsaw Ghetto, ŻZW received the news of the German plans and managed to hide most of its members in bunkers, which resulted in fewer than 20 of them being arrested by the Germans. Although Dawid Mordechaj Apfelbaum could not convince Adam Czerniaków to start an armed uprising against the Germans during the deportation, the organization managed to preserve most of its members - and assets. It also started to train more members and by January 1943 it already had roughly 500 men at arms in Warsaw alone. The technological department of the ŻZW, together with Captain Cezary Ketling's group of the PLAN resistance organization managed to dig two secret tunnels under the walls of the ghetto, providing contact with the outside and allowing smuggling of arms into the ghetto.

=== Structure ===
The military leader of the ŻZW at the time of the uprising was Dr. Paweł Frenkiel, and its political leader (Zionist Revisionist), Dr. David Wdowiński. The organization was divided onto groups of five soldiers. Three groups formed a unit, four units formed a platoon and four platoons - a company, composed of roughly 240 men. In early January 1943 the ŻZW had two entirely manned and fully armed companies and two additional en cadre companies, to be manned by newly arrived volunteers when need arises. This indeed happened in April 1943, though the actual number of ŻZW soldiers to take part in the Uprising is a matter of debate. Apart from the fighting groups, the ŻZW was organized into several departments.

1. Political Chair, Dawid Wdowiński
2. Information Department, directed by Leon Rodal;
3. Organization Department, directed by Paweł Frenkel;
4. Supply Department ("Kwatermistrzowski"), directed by Leon Wajnsztok;
5. Finances Department, without a director;
6. Communication Department (contacts with Armia Krajowa mainly), directed by Dawid Apfelbaum;
7. Medical Department led by dr Józef Celmajster (under pseudonym Niemirski);
8. Juridical Department under Dawid Szulman;
9. Rescue (Ratowanie) Department (transporting Jewish children and others outside the ghetto), under Kalma Mendelson;
10. Department of Technology, Transport and Supplies (which, among other things, built two tunnels under the Ghetto walls) led by Hanoch Federbusz;
11. Military Department under Paweł Frenkel and Dawid Apfelbaum.

== Warsaw Ghetto Uprising ==
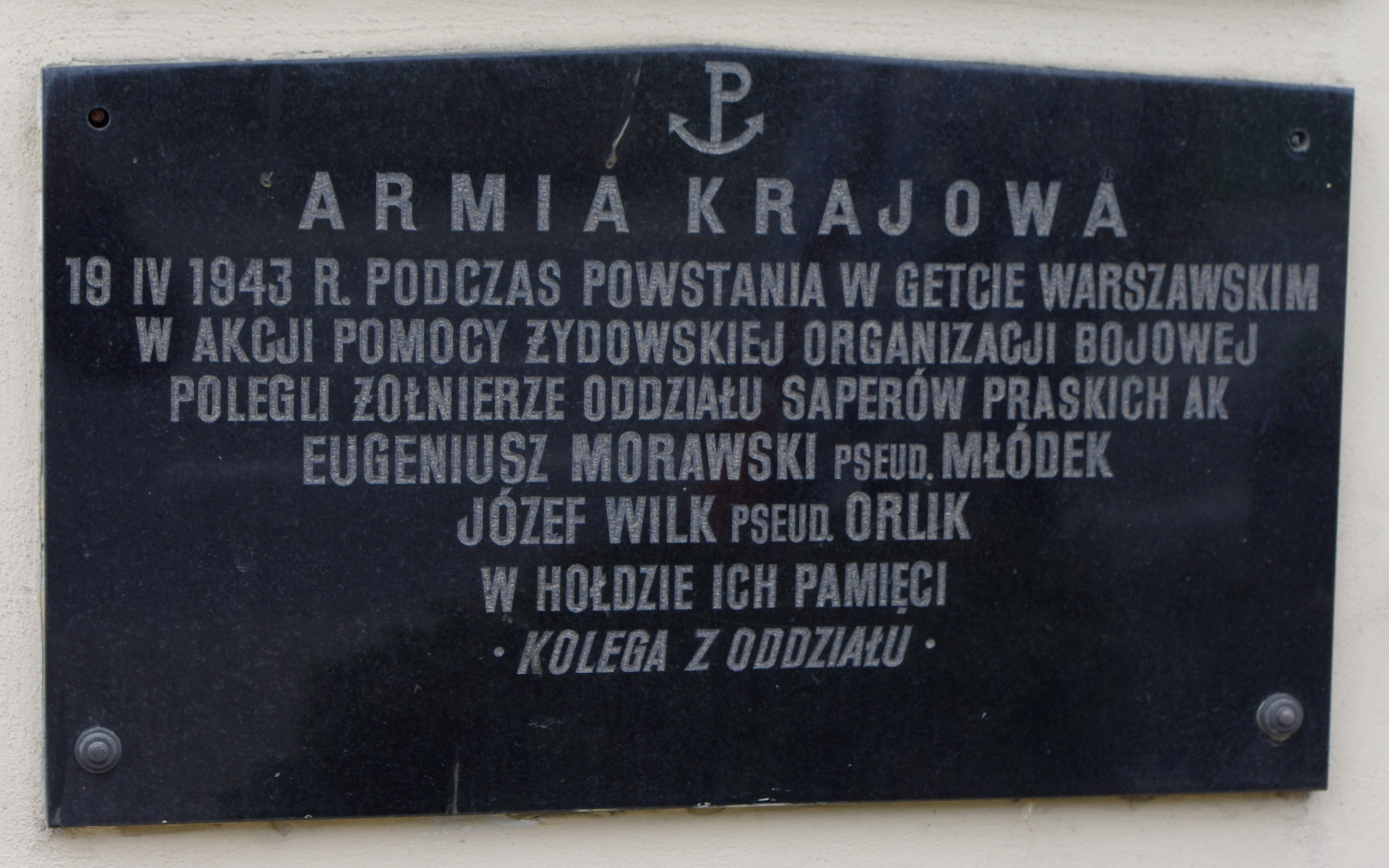
Plaque commemorating Home Army soldiers - Eugeniusz Morawski ps. "Młodek" and Józef Wilk ps. "Orlik" killed during the Ghetto Action on the wall Church of St. John of God at ul. Bonifraterska 12 in Warsaw.

During the Warsaw Ghetto Uprising ŻZW is said to have had about 400 well-armed fighters grouped in 11 units. ŻZW fought together with AK fighters in Muranowska Street (4 units under Frenkel). Dawid M. Apfelbaum took position in Miła Street. Heniek Federbusz group organized a strong pocket of resistance in a house near Zamenhoff Street. Jan Pika unit took position in Miła Street, while unit of Leizer Staniewicz fought in the Nalewki, Gęsia Street and Franciszkańska street. Dawid Berliński's group took position in second part of Nalewki. Roman Winsztok commanded group near Muranowska, where also the headquarters of the Union was located (Muranowska 7/9 Street). Photograph of ŻZW headquarters at 2 Muranów Street Warsaw

=== After the war ===
Already during the war the influence and the importance of the Żydowski Związek Wojskowy was being downgraded. The surviving commanders of the leftist ŻOB either did not mention the ŻZW's fight in the Warsaw Ghetto Uprising in their writings at all, or belittled its importance. Also the war-time Soviet propaganda did only briefly mention the fighters as they collided with its aims of presenting the Soviet Union as the only defender of the European Jewry. In addition, except for Dawid Wdowiński none of the high-ranking commanders of the ŻZW survived the war to tell their part of the story and it was not until 1963 that Wdowiński's memoirs were published.

This led to a number of myths concerning both the ŻZW and the Uprising being commonly repeated in many modern publications. This was even strengthened by the post-war propaganda of the Polish communists, who openly underlined the value of the leftist Żydowska Organizacja Bojowa, while suppressing all publications on the Armia Krajowa-backed ŻZW.

The "Contact" ring used as a sign between the ŻZW and the Armia Krajowa is displayed in Yad Vashem. A means of identification, used in particular during meetings of higher level officers, were two identical gold rings set with a red stone engraved with Jewish symbols. It was not enough for the contacts to show the ring, they were expected to explain the significance of the symbols.

The ring that was in the possession of the Jewish underground fighters, was destroyed in the ruins of the Ghetto. Its twin remained in the hands of Henryk Iwanski, the Polish underground fighter and later was brought to the museum in Jerusalem, Israel.

== Historiography and reliability of accounts ==
Research published in 2011 by historians Dariusz Libionka and Laurence Weinbaum challenged the validity of several postwar accounts regarding the ŻZW, particularly the testimony of Henryk Iwański. Iwański's claims had heavily influenced earlier writers, including Maciej Kledzik, Marian Apfelbaum, Stefan Bratkowski, and Moshe Arens, and were uncritically accepted in many secondary sources. Their work raised significant doubts about the veracity of memoirs and testimonies from Kalman Mendelson, Tadeusz Bednarczyk, Jack Eisner, David J. Landau, Maurice Shainberg, Joseph Greenblatt, and others.

Libionka and Weinbaum concluded that Dawid Moryc Apfelbaum may have been an entirely fictitious figure and that the contact ring, the most emblematic relic of the Revisionist group, is likely a forgery. They attributed the source of many of these historical distortions to manipulations by the Polish Communist secret police. Despite deconstructing these fabricated accounts, they emphasized that the findings do not diminish the actual heroism of the ŻZW. They noted that the organization played a major role in the uprising, but its genuine contributions were subsequently erased from postwar historical memory.

== See also ==
- Jewish Military Organization
- Warsaw Ghetto Uprising
- Żegota
- Marek Edelman

== Notes and references ==
In-line:

General:

1. Chaim Lazar (1966). Muranowska 7: the Warsaw Ghetto rising. Tel Aviv: Massada P.E.C. Press. p. 341.
2. Maciej Kledzik (June 2004). "Zapomniani żołnierze (Forgotten Soldiers)". Rzeczpospolita (in Polish). 136 (2004–06–12). Archived from the original on 2007-03-06.
