= Polish People's Army (1943–1945) =

The Polish People's Army (PAL) (Polska Armia Ludowa) was an underground leftist military organization in Nazi-occupied Poland during World War II. It was active between 1943 and 1945. At its peak it numbered several thousand members.

At its inception it was composed of two smaller leftist organizations, the People's Militia of the Socialist Workers' Party of Poland (Milicja Ludowa Robotniczej Partii Polskich Socjalistów RPPS) and Polish People's Independence Action - PLAN (Polska Ludowa Akcja Niepodległościowa PLAN), and an essentially apolitical underground group created by former officers of Poland's Border Protection Corps.

The commander of the group was general Henryk Borucki (nom de guerre Czarny).
