= Henryk Iwański =

Polish resistance fighter

Henryk Iwański (1902–1978), nom de guerre Bystry, was a member of the Polish resistance during World War II. He is known for leading one of the most daring actions of the Armia Krajowa (Home Army) in support of the Warsaw Ghetto Uprising, however later research cast doubts on the veracity of his claims. For his assistance to the Polish Jews Iwański was bestowed the title of the Righteous Among the Nations by Yad Vashem in Jerusalem in 1964.

== Life ==
Before the Second World War Henryk had reached the rank of captain in the Polish Army. Soon after Nazi Germany invaded Poland and began the Holocaust, Henryk was instrumental in the founding of the Żydowski Związek Wojskowy (Jewish Military Union). Together with the rest of his family he dedicated himself to support the Jews, working through the Polish resistance (Armia Krajowa). Iwański was one of the AK members dealing with the Jews, providing them with arms, ammunition, and instructional materials smuggled through the sewers or in carts that brought lime and cement into the ghetto.

"…heavy casualties were sustained by the ZZW, losing many of its leading fighters. Apfelbaum and Rodal were mortally wounded in fighting that raged on April 27 and 28. Iwanski's brother, Edvard, fell in Muranowska Square, his son, Roman was mortally wounded, and Iwanski himself was wounded during those days."

Zbigniew, another son of Henryk fought on Karmelicka Street and died on May 3, 1943, escorting a group of Jews out of the ghetto. After being wounded, Iwański was brought from the ghetto, escorted by a group of Polish and Jewish fighters, among them Ber Mark, who later wrote a book about the Uprising. Nonetheless, Iwański returned to the ghetto at least once more, bringing another set of ammunition and supplies. This was one of several actions of the Polish resistance providing assistance to the Jews in the ghetto.

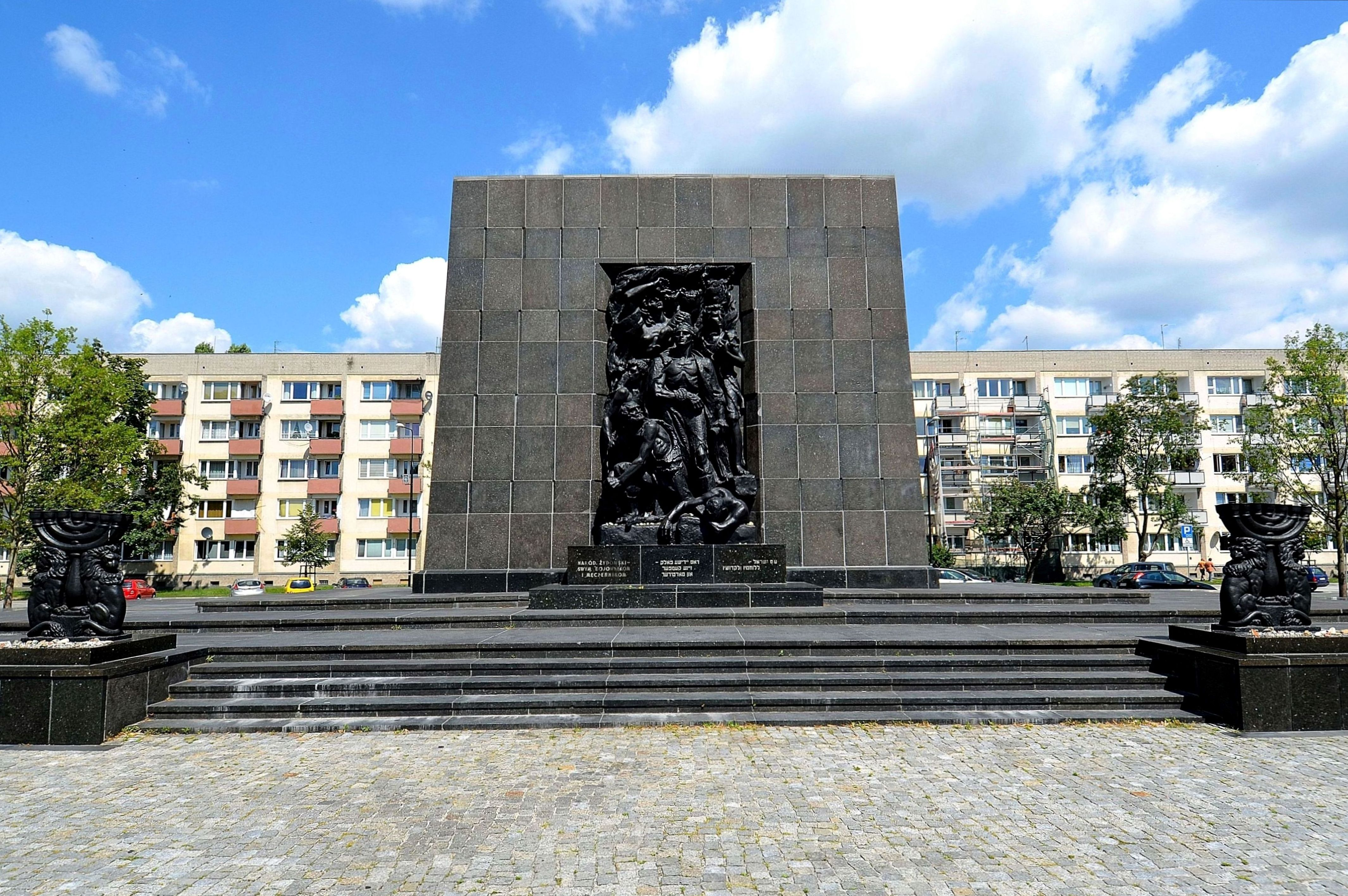
Monument to the Ghetto Heroes in Warsaw

In 1963, for his actions Iwański was awarded the Silver Cross of Virtuti Militari, one of Poland's highest military decorations for valor. Soon later, in 1964, with his wife Wiktoria he was decorated with the medal of Righteous Among the Nations.

== Controversy ==
Recent questions concerning inconsistencies regarding the nature and extent of Iwanski's support for the Jewish underground have been raised. Examinations of Israeli and Polish archives have brought allegations that Iwanski exaggerated his war time activities, had made antisemitic and anti-Israeli radio and television broadcasts, and as an informant of Polish secret police had spied on Nazi hunter Simon Wiesenthal as an informant against the Jewish Historical Institute.

The Polish-Israeli authors of a 2011 book on the Jewish Military Union (ŻZW), Dariusz Libionka and Laurence Weinbaum, suggest that Iwański's story of heroism in the ghetto revolt is a fabrication and that he did not even have any male children. They point out that Iwański succeeded in convincing visiting journalists from abroad, most notably Chaja Lazar and Dan Kurzman, of the veracity of his story which is one of the reasons it gained credence and tremendous popularity.

== See also ==
- Henryk Woliński
- List of Poles
