= Conversations with an Executioner =

1981 book by Kazimierz Moczarski

- Author: Kazimierz Moczarski
- Original title: Rozmowy z katem
- Language: English
- Subject: The Holocaust
- Genre: History
- Publisher: Prentice-Hall
- Publication date: First Edition 1981
- Publication place: United States
- Pages: 282
- ISBN: 0131719181
- OCLC: 7277353

Conversations with an Executioner (Polish: Rozmowy z katem) is a book by Kazimierz Moczarski, a Polish writer and journalist, officer of the Polish Home Army who was active in the anti-Nazi resistance during World War II. On 11 August 1945, he was captured and imprisoned in a maximum-security prison by the notorious UB secret police under Stalinism. For a time, he shared the same cell with the Nazi war criminal Jürgen Stroop, who was soon to be executed. They engaged in a series of conversations. The book is a retelling of those interviews.

Moczarski spent four years on death row (1952–1956), incarcerated as an alleged enemy of the state. He was tried three times while in prison as an anticommunist, and pardoned eleven years later, during the anti-Stalinist Polish October. His manuscript about Stroop, written in secrecy from 1956, was published in monthly installments by the magazine Odra in 1972–1974, followed by a shortened book version released in 1977. The full text without communist censorship was published in 1992 after the collapse of the Soviet bloc, by the Polish Scientific Publishers PWN. Moczarski did not witness the publication of his book. He died on 27 September 1975 in Warsaw, weakened by the years of physical torture endured during his police interrogations.

== Background ==
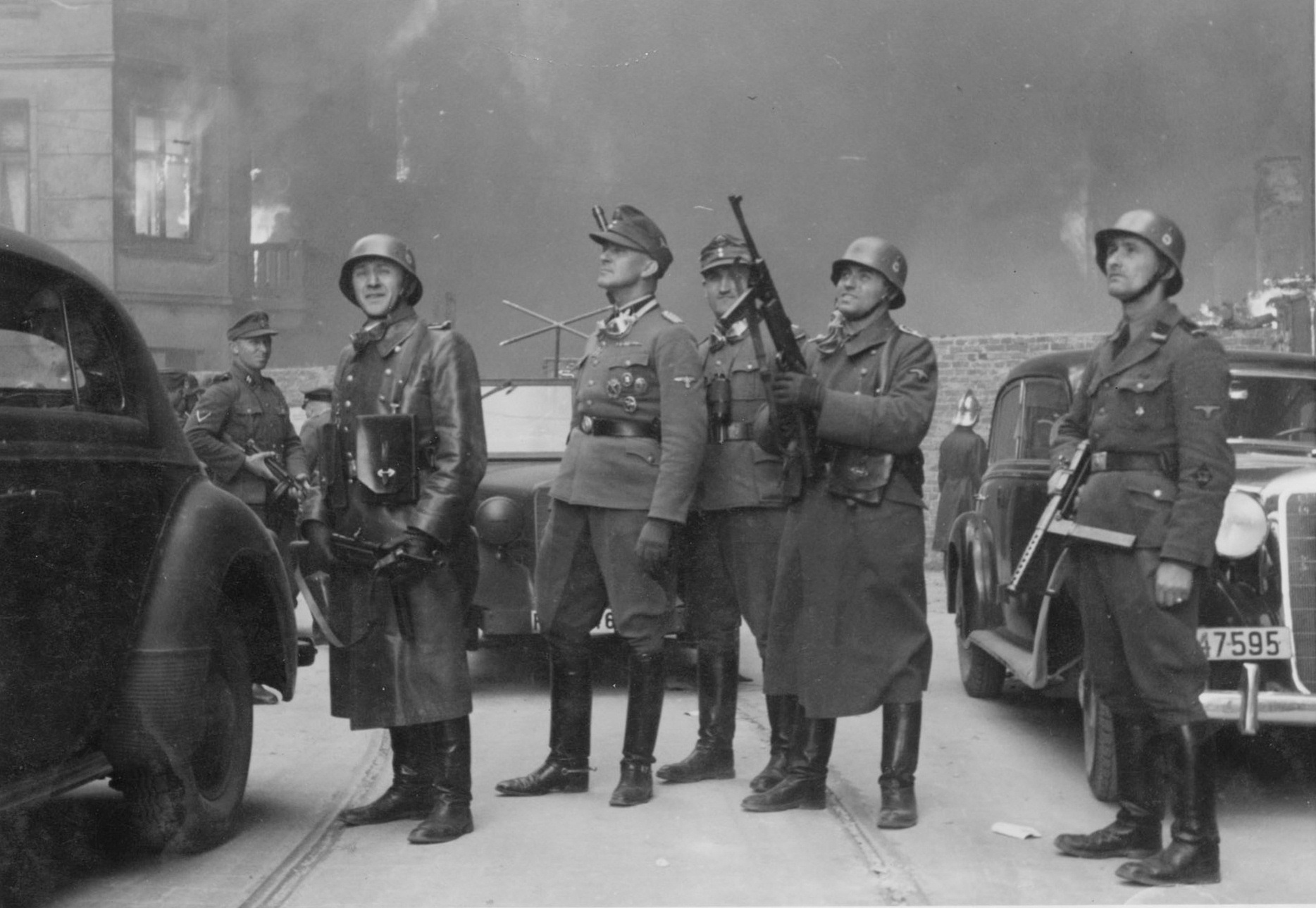
Jürgen Stroop (center, in a field cap) with his men observe the burning of Warsaw Ghetto during the suppression of the Warsaw Ghetto Uprising, 1943

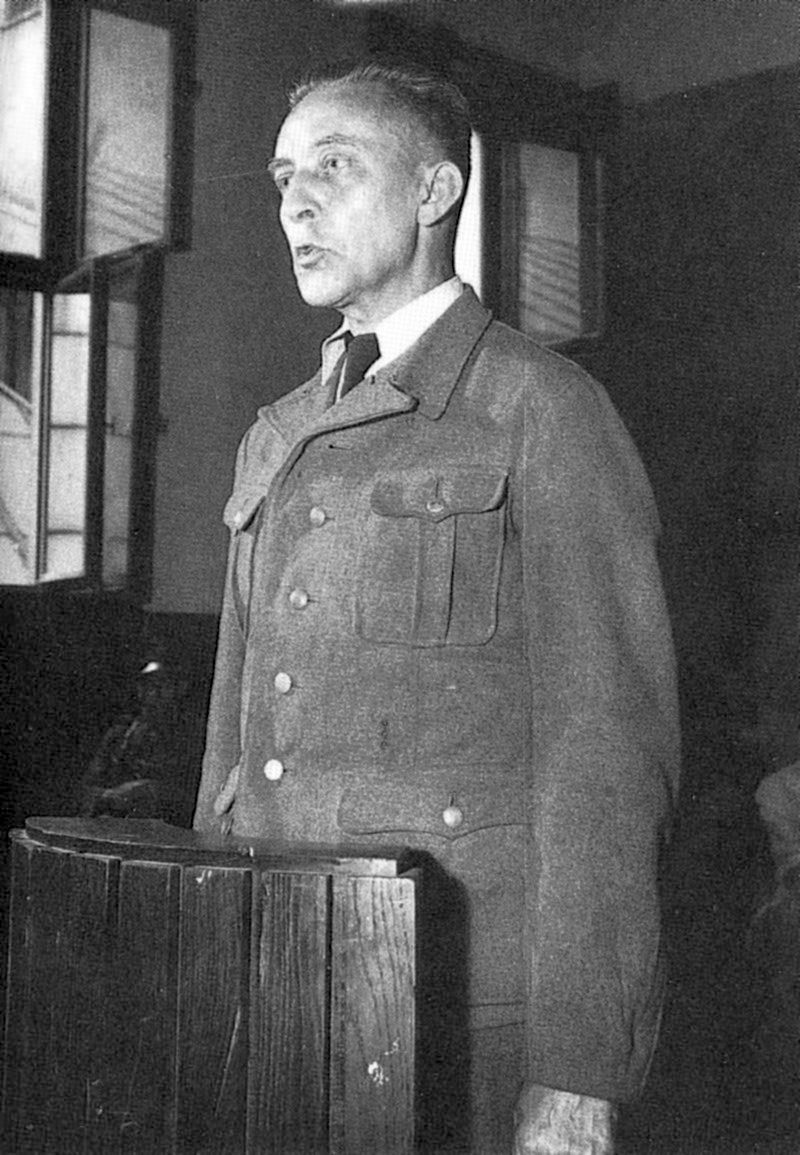
Stroop before a Polish court in 1951

SS-Gruppenführer Jürgen Stroop was taken prisoner by the Allies in Germany under a false identity. He was tried by the U.S. Military Tribunal at Dachau on unrelated charges. In late May 1947, Stroop was handed over for retrial to the People's Republic of Poland for the suppression of the Warsaw Ghetto Uprising and the methodical destruction of the ghetto. His crimes resulted in the death of over 50,000 people. He was kept in jail for four years before the Criminal District Court in Warsaw put him on trial on July 18, 1951, for the war crimes committed in Poland. Stroop was executed on 6 March 1952, arrogant and unrepentant until the very end.

Moczarski spent nine months (or 255 days) with Stroop, locked in his cell from March 2, 1949, until November 11, 1949. The Stalinists falsely accused Moczarski of being a Nazi, which in turn allowed Stroop to relax in his presence, his every word a form of confession with nothing held back. Moczarski himself was sentenced to death on November 18, 1952. The following October, his sentence was commuted to life imprisonment, but he was not informed about the change. In December 1956, at the end of Stalinist terror in Poland, he was retried for the last time, pronounced innocent, and rehabilitated. The courts declared that the charges against him were utterly falsified by the ministry under Roman Romkowski who ordered his brutal treatment. Some 15 years after his torturous ordeal had ended, Moczarski began writing his book in 1971 using notes collected since 1956 and published parts of it soon thereafter. Some of his Polish followers asked how he could remember it so well. It was due to his heightened state of alertness that only death row could bring, he said. In the Annex to his book Moczarski explained that also Stroop, seemingly unable to remember any Polish word learned a day earlier, was happy to recite every single line from his reports to Hitler.

== Conversations ==
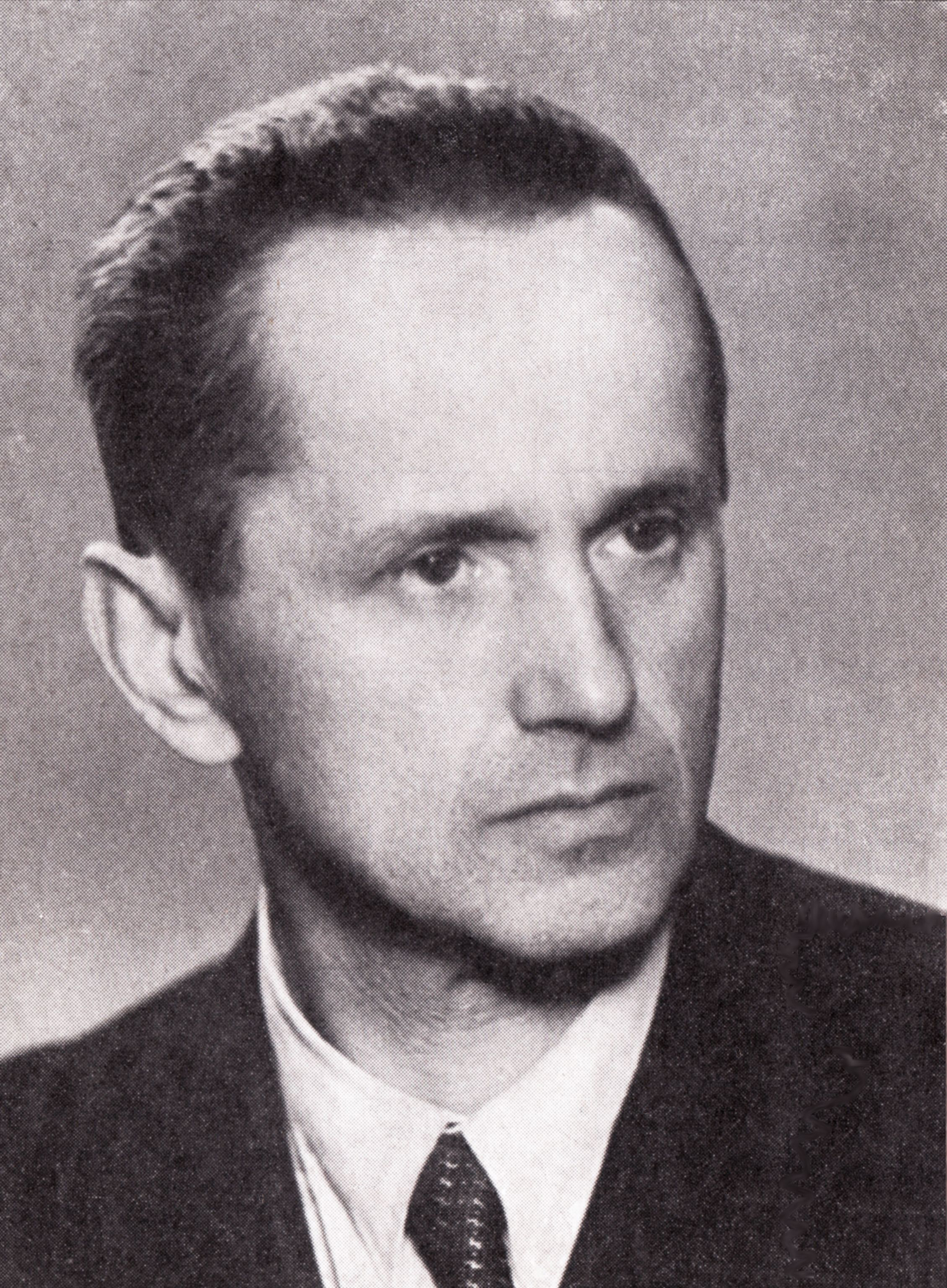
Kazimierz Moczarski, c. 1956

The uncut Polish edition of the book by Moczarski is preceded by a foreword written by Andrzej Szczypiorski and followed by the biography and glossary of German names and terms by Andrzej Krzysztof Kunert. The book is composed of 26 chapters, each with a separate title and structured like a traditional biography, beginning with the description of their first meeting in prison, and then continuing in a chronological order from the subject's birth until his execution, with additional themes woven into the central story. Moczarski and Stroop were not alone in the cell. The third inmate was SS-Untersturmführer Gustav Schielke from the Waffen-SS, originally from Hanover. All three slept on narrow mattresses placed on the floor for the night. There was a retractable wall bed in the cell, which none of them used out of respect for the others.

Stroop derived considerable pleasure from talking, giving him a new focus and a reason to live, especially due to Moczarski's genuine interest in every detail of his story. Stroop described the destruction of the Warsaw Ghetto after the ghetto uprising in minute detail, eager to mention the foreign Hilfswilliger ("willing helpers") in the death of over 50,000 Polish Jews: "They did not understand Polish," he said, "and therefore, were unable to communicate with the people of Warsaw. This was exactly what we wanted. We called them Trawniki men." Moczarski translated his interior monologues in the first person, and did not dramatize any of the admittedly irrational parts.

The book, written in Polish and published as Rozmowy z katem in 1978 by Państwowy Instytut Wydawniczy, was translated to English and published in 1981 by Prentice-Hall as Conversations with an Executioner. Prominent translations include German, as Gespräche mit dem Henker, published by Droste, Düsseldorf, in 1978; French, as Entretiens avec le bourreau by Gallimard, Paris, in 1979; Hebrew, as Śiḥot ʻim talyan by Loḥame ha-Geṭaʼot, Tel Aviv, in 1979–80; Czech, as Rozhovory s katem by Jota, Brno, in 2007; and Ukrainian, as Besìdi z katom by Černìvcì in 2009, among several others.

From May 2024, a manuscript of the book is presented at a permanent exhibition in the Palace of the Commonwealth in Warsaw.

In 2026, a new English translation (of the full, uncensored text) by Sean Gasper Bye was published by Duckworth Books.

== In popular culture ==
- The Rozmowy z katem (Conversations with an Executioner) based on Kazimierz Moczarski's memoir have been made into a Polish television film in 2006. Stroop is played by the actor Piotr Fronczewski. The film received three awards at the 2007 Krajowy Festiwal Teatru Polskiego Radia i Teatru TV "Dwa Teatry".
- In 2007, filmmaker Maciej Englert created a DVD documentary entitled "Conversations With An Executioner" based on Moczarski's book.
- On April 18, 2012, Philip Boehm's stage adaptation of Moczarski's Conversations with.an Executioner premiered at the Upstream Theater in St. Louis, Missouri.
