= Kazimierz Moczarski =

Polish writer and journalist (1907–1975)

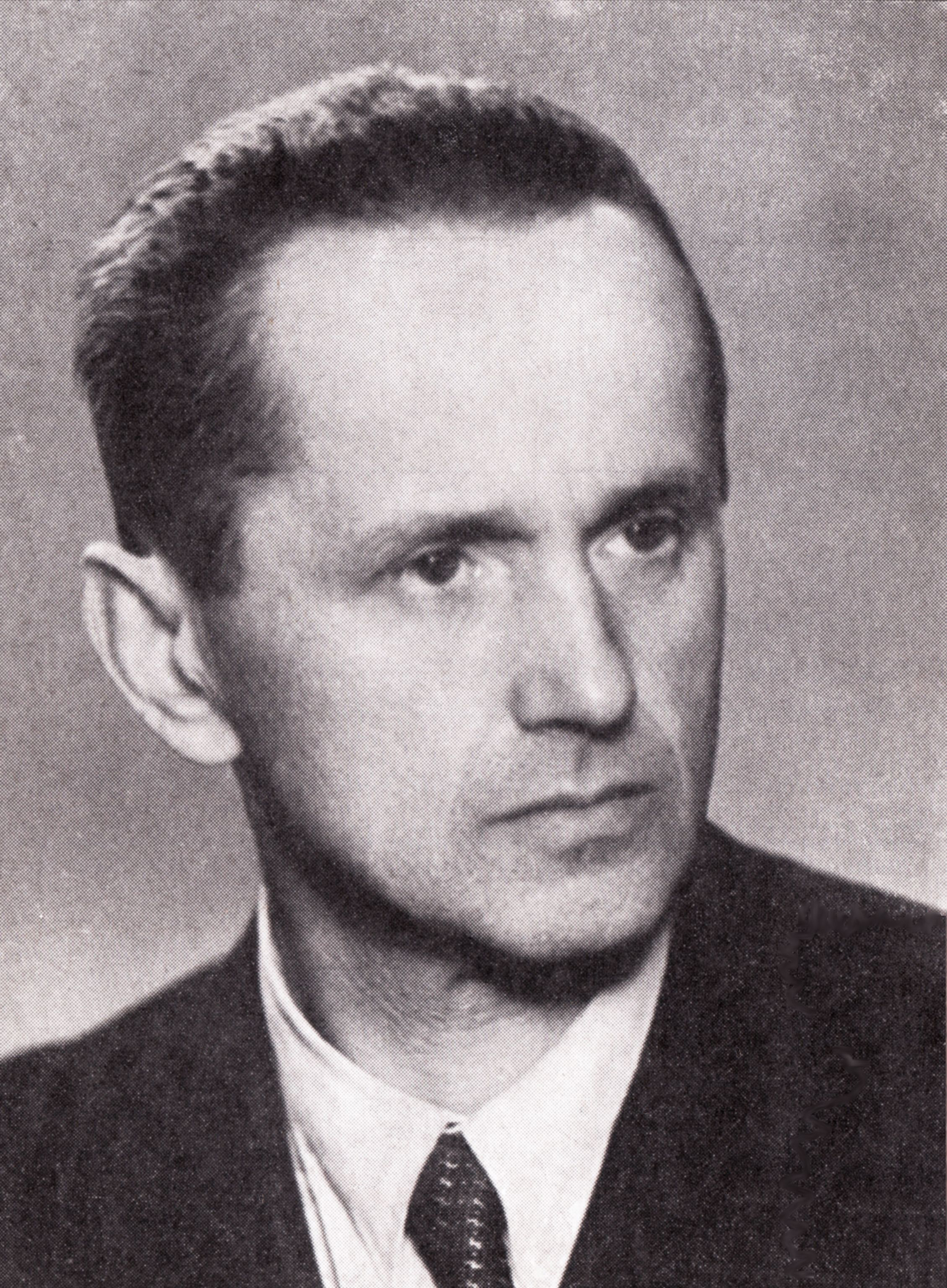
- Kazimierz Moczarski in c.1956
- Born: 21 July 1907; Warsaw, Congress Poland, Russian Empire
- Died: 27 September 1975 (aged 68); Warsaw, Polish People's Republic
- Known for: Conversations with an Executioner (biography)

Kazimierz Damazy Moczarski (21 July 1907 – 27 September 1975) was a Polish writer and journalist, an officer of the Polish Home Army (noms de guerre: Borsuk, Grawer, Maurycy, and Rafał; active in anti-Nazi resistance). His book Conversations with an Executioner, recounted a series of interviews with Nazi war criminal Jürgen Stroop, a fellow inmate of the UB secret police prison under Stalinism, who was soon to be executed. Thrown in jail in 1945 and pardoned eleven years later during Polish October, Moczarski spent four years on death row (1952–56), and was tried three times as an enemy of the state while in prison.

== Biography ==
Born on 21 July 1907 in Warsaw, Moczarski was the son of Jan Damazy, teacher and school principal, and Michalina Franciszka née Wodzinowska, also a teacher. Kazimierz began studying law at Warsaw University in October 1926. During his studies, he was drafted to Reserve Infantry Battalion No.9 and served at Bereza Kartuska in 1929–1930 for 10 months. Following his graduation in December 1932, he continued his studies in France at the Institute of Higher International Studies of Paris University. In 1935, he returned to Warsaw and became an advisor to the Ministry of Labor and Social Services, specializing in Polish and international law. He was also a member of the "Youth Legion", and a member of the progressive organization "Labor Club Maurycy Mochnacki". In 1937, he took part in the setting-up of the Democratic Club of Warsaw. Their first meeting took place at his own Warsaw apartment.

=== World War II ===
During the 1939 Polish-German September campaign, Moczarski commanded a platoon subordinate to the 30th Infantry Division. He saw combat during the Siege of Warsaw. After the Fall of Poland, Moczarski remained an active member of the clandestine Democratic Alliance. He also joined the Polish Resistance and became an officer in the Polish Home Army (Armia Krajowa, AK) under the nom de guerre of "Rafał". Until the fall of 1943, he was assigned to the "Bureau of Intelligence and Propaganda" (BiP) for the AK's Warsaw District.

In May 1944, under the new pseudonym "Maurycy", Moczarski took the post of the Head of Department of Personnel Sabotage. His assignment, at which he excelled, was to assassinate members of the Gestapo, collaborationists, and Gestapo informers in the AK's ranks. It was his idea to rescue, on 11 June 1944, Polish prisoners incarcerated by the Gestapo at Warsaw's Jan Boży Hospital (pl).

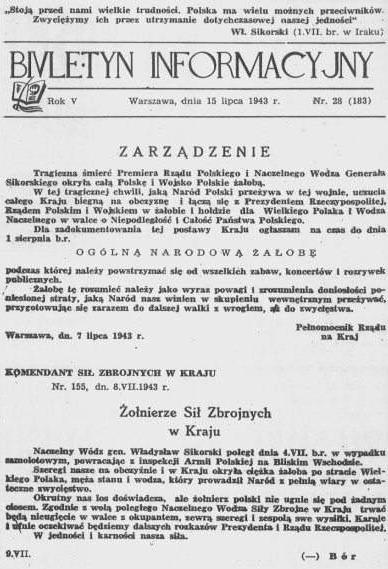
Biuletyn Informacyjny from 15 July 1943 informing about the death of general Władysław Sikorski and pronouncing a national day of mourning

Shortly before the Warsaw Uprising by the underground resistance, Moczarski was given a new post as the head of the radio and telegraph services of Home Army's headquarters. During the uprising, Moczarski was directing one of the insurgent's radio stations, "Rafał" located in Warsaw's district Śródmieście-Północ. In September 1944, he moved to another station, "Danuta" located at 16 Widok street. At the same time, he was editor-in-chief of Wiadomości Powstańcze (Uprising News), which was a daily regional addition to the Home Army's Biuletyn Informacyjny (Information Bulletin). On 14 September 1944 he was promoted to the post of reserve Lieutenant.

After the collapse of the Warsaw Uprising on 7 October 1944 he left the city with a group of coworkers from BiP along with the evacuees of the Red Cross, and stopped in Pruszków, but returned shortly afterwards, to help with the escape of Jan Stanisław Jankowski, the delegate of Polish Government in exile. He was appointed head of the Home Army's Information and Propaganda office BiP on 26 October 1944. Destroyed during the uprising, the office was reinstated in Częstochowa. Moczarski continued his underground activities there, changing his nickname to "Grawer" (Engraver).

=== Postwar ===
The Polish Home Army (AK) was disbanded by High Command on 19 January 1945 as peace in Poland took hold. Moczarski was promoted to captain of the reserve team. Meanwhile, in place of the AK a new organization was formed by General Anders against the communist takeover, called the Armed Forces Delegation for Poland (Delegatura Sił Zbrojnych na Kraj, DSZ). Moczarski remained the head of BiP, using a new pseudonym "Borsuk" (Badger). Together with Włodzimierz Lechowicz and Zygmunt Kapitaniak, he co-authored a memorandum to his headquarters which stipulated that a new order must be made out to all underground soldiers in the field about laying down arms in the name of reconstruction. Their proposal was accepted and on 24 July 1945 an order was issued by the Head of DSZ, Colonel Jan Rzepecki, entitled "To former soldiers of Home Army" which stated:

Depending on your personal situation, for as long as the senseless harassment by the so-called security forces would not prohibit this measure, do take part in a broad-based effort of reconstruction of Poland openly, while remaining true to the democratic principles of personal freedom and national sovereignty, so dear to every soldier of the former Home Army.	Jeśli tylko pozwala na to Wasze osobiste położenie, jeśli bezmyślne prześladowanie przez tzw. «bezpieczeństwo» nie zamyka Wam tej drogi, przystępujcie do jawnej pracy na wszystkich polach nad odbudową Polski, pozostając wiernymi drogim każdemu żołnierzowi byłej AK demokratycznym hasłom Wolności Obywatela - Niezawisłości Narodu.

=== Imprisonment ===
On 11 August 1945, five days after the Delegation for Poland officially dissolved, Moczarski was arrested by Ministry of State Security headed by Gen. Romkowski and put on political trial. On 18 January 1946 Moczarski was sentenced to 10 years in prison by a military court in Warsaw. Even though his penitentiary sentence was shortened to five years in February 1947, he was not released from Mokotów Prison upon his sentence's fulfilment four years later. The darkest years of Stalinism in Poland were yet to come. Interrogated by Romkowski's subordinates from 9 January 1949 till 6 June 1951, Moczarski endured 49 different types of torture later described in his memoir. Beatings included truncheon blows to bridge of nose, salivary glands, chin, shoulder blades, bare feet and toes (particularly painful), heels (ten blows each foot, several times a day), cigarette burns on lips and eyelids and burning of fingers. Sleep deprivation, resulting in near-madness – meant standing upright in a narrow cell for seven to nine days with frequent blows to the face – a hallucinatory method called by the interrogators "Zakopane". General Romkowski had already told him on 30 November 1948 that he had personally requested this "sheer hell".

Beginning 2 March 1949, as means of psychological torture, Moczarski was locked up for nine months with two German SS-men: SS-Untersturmführer of BdS Krakau Gustav Schielke and SS-Gruppenführer Jürgen Stroop. Stroop was responsible for the annihilation of the Warsaw Ghetto after the 1943 uprising. His crimes resulted in the death of over 50,000 people. A committed Nazi, unrepentant until the very end, he was put on trial on 18 July 1951 for the war crimes committed in Poland and executed on 6 March 1952.

Also in 1952, a brand new Stalinist trial of Moczarski opened on counterrevolutionary charges falsified on site by MBP. On 18 November 1952, by the decision of Warsaw's District Court, he was sentenced to death as an enemy of the state. The following October, his sentence was commuted to life imprisonment, but he was not informed about it. He believed that he was still on death row until January 1955, awaiting execution at a moment's notice until someone finally informed him of the verdict.

=== Rehabilitation suit ===
During the massive anti-Stalinist upheaval known as the Polish October thaw, Moczarski was retried for the last time, pronounced innocent and released from prison on 24 June 1956. He was cleared of all trumped-up charges against him and fully rehabilitated in December 1956, at the end of Stalinist terror in Poland.

After his release, Moczarski rejoined the Democratic Party of Poland. He worked as a journalist at the Kurier Polski (Polish Courier) newspaper, being responsible for contacts with readers. He was also active in the anti-alcohol movement, and for some time he was editor-in-chief of a Problemy Alkoholizmu (Issues of Alcoholism) magazine.

== Conversations with an Executioner ==
Immediately after his release, Moczarski began writing down notes about Stroop. In 1971 he turned them into a full-length book, verifying what facts he could in publications, court transcripts and archive materials. In April 1972, the first installment of his Rozmowy z katem (Conversations with an Executioner) was published by the Odra monthly. The story continued to run in parts until February 1974, ending with an interview with Moczarski about its origin. Rozmowy z katem was published in book form in 1977 by the Państwowy Instytut Wydawniczy with various details censored by the regime. Moczarski did not witness the publication of his book. He died on 27 September 1975 in Warsaw.

The unabridged edition, with a foreword by Andrzej Szczypiorski and followed by Moczarski's biography and a glossary of German names and terms by Andrzej Krzysztof Kunert, was published after the collapse of Communism by the Polish Scientific Publishers PWN in 1992.

The book was published in English in 1981 by Prentice-Hall. In 2026, a new English translation by Sean Gaspar Bye was published by Duckworth. Other translations include German, published by Droste in 1978; French by Gallimard, in 1979; Hebrew by Loḥame ha-Geṭaʼot, in 1979–80; Czech by Mladá fronta in 1985 (the full version by Jota in 2007); and Ukrainian, by Černìvcì in 2009, among several others. Moczarski's biography written by Kunert was published in 2006 with foreword by Władysław Bartoszewski.

== In popular culture ==
- In the 2006 Polish television film Rozmowy z katem (Conversations with an Executioner), based on Moczarski's memoir, Stroop is played by Piotr Fronczewski.
- In 2007, filmmaker Maciej Englert created a DVD documentary entitled "Conversations With An Executioner" based on Moczarski's book.
- On April 18, 2012, Philip Boehm's stage adaptation of Moczarski's Conversations with.an Executioner premiered at the Upstream Theater in St. Louis, Missouri.

== Bibliography ==
- Kazimierz Moczarski "Conversations with an Executioner" Prentice-Hall 1981, ISBN 0-13-171918-1
- Kazimierz Moczarski "Zapiski" Państwowy Instytut Wydawniczy 1990, ISBN 83-06-01861-3
