= Jürg Laederach =

Swiss writer

Jürg Laederach (20 December 1945 – 19 March 2018) was a Swiss writer.

Jürg Laederach was an author of experimental prose as well as plays and radio plays. He has also distinguished himself as a translator from English and French.

== Awards ==
- 1997 Austrian State Prize for European Literature
- 2005 Italo Svevo Award

== Works ==
- Einfall der Dämmerung, Frankfurt am Main 1974
- Im Verlauf einer langen Erinnerung, Frankfurt am Main 1977
- Das ganze Leben, Frankfurt am Main 1978
- Die Lehrerin verspricht der Negerin wärmere Tränen, Frankfurt am Main 1978
- Ein milder Winter, Frankfurt am Main 1978
- Wittgenstein in Graz, Frankfurt am Main 1979
- Das Buch der Klagen, Frankfurt am Main 1980
- Fahles Ende kleiner Begierden, Frankfurt am Main 1981
- Proper operation, Frankfurt am Main 1981
- 69 Arten den Blues zu spielen, Frankfurt am Main 1984
- Tod eines Kellners, Frankfurt am Main 1984 (with Andres Müry)
- Flugelmeyers Wahn, Frankfurt am Main 1986
- Körper brennen, Graz 1986 (with Andres Müry)
- Sigmund oder Der Herr der Seelen tötet seine, Frankfurt am Main 1986
- Vor Schrecken starr, Frankfurt am Main 1988
- Der zweite Sinn oder Unsentimentale Reise durch ein Feld Literatur, Frankfurt am Main 1988
- China, Frankfurt am Main 1990
- Emanuel, Frankfurt am Main 1990
- Passion, Frankfurt am Main 1993
- Eccentric, Kunst und Leben, Frankfurt am Main 1994
- Schattenmänner, Frankfurt am Main 1994
- Über Robert Walser, Salzburg u.a. 1997 (with William H. Gass)
- Portrait, Baden/Schweiz 1998 (with Felix von Muralt)
- In Hackensack, Basel u.a. 2003

=== Editor ===
- Adolf Wölfli: "0 Grad 0/000! Entbrantt von Liebes,=Flammen", Frankfurt am Main 1996

== Sources ==
- Dariusz Komorowski: Bewegungsästhetik in den Romanen von Jürg Laederach, Würzburg 2002. ISBN 3-8260-2248-3
