= Jürgen Stroop =

German SS officer (1895–1952)

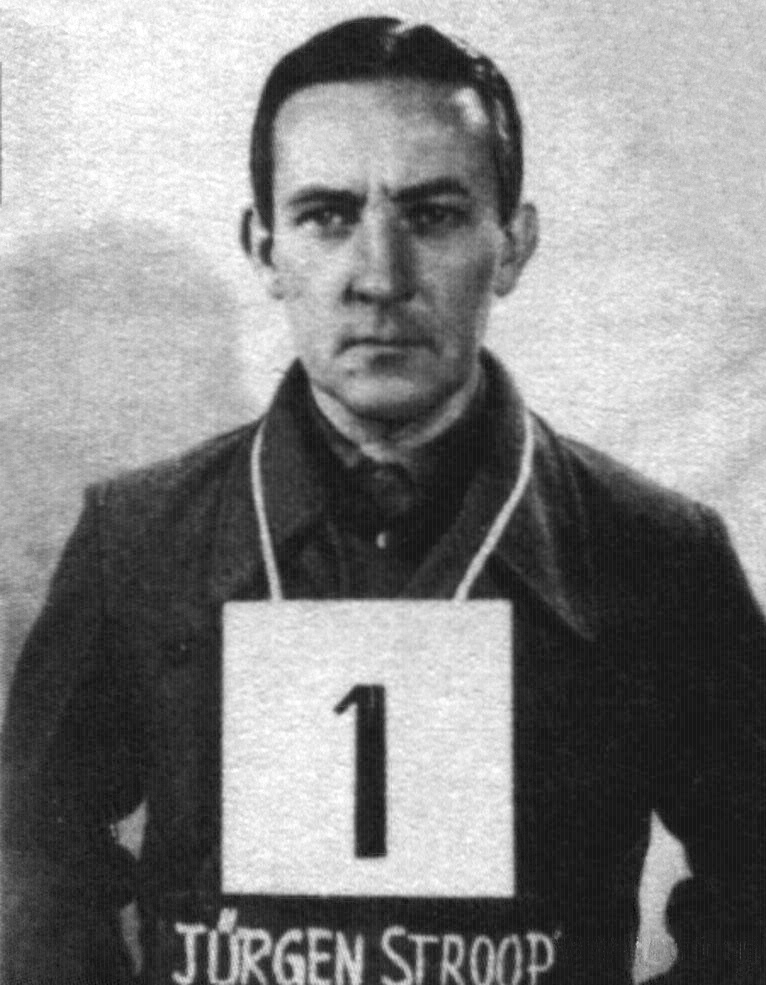
- Stroop in 1945
- Born: Josef Stroop; 26 September 1895; Detmold, Lippe, German Empire
- Died: 6 March 1952 (aged 56); Mokotów Prison, Warsaw, Polish People's Republic
- Cause of death: Execution by hanging
- Known for: Suppression of Warsaw Ghetto Uprising; Stroop Report
- Spouse: Katharina (m. 1923)
- Children: 2
- Status: Executed
- Convictions: U.S. Military; War crimes Membership in a criminal organization Poland; Crimes against humanity Membership in a criminal organization
- Penalty: U.S. Military; Death; Poland; Death
- Military and SS career
- Allegiance: German Empire; Nazi Germany
- Branch: German Imperial Army; Waffen-SS; Ordnungspolizei
- Rank: SS-Gruppenführer
- Commands: SS and Police Leader, Poland and Greece
- Conflicts: World War I World War II
- Awards: Iron Cross 1st Class

Jürgen Stroop (born Josef Stroop, 26 September 1895 – 6 March 1952) was a German SS commander and perpetrator of the Holocaust during the Nazi era, who served as SS and Police Leader in occupied Poland and Greece from 1942–1943 (in Poland) and 1943–1944 (in Greece). He held the rank of SS-Gruppenführer und Generalleutnant der Polizei from 1942–1945 (equivalent to a Heer Generalleutnant/Lt-Gen in the Wehrmacht). He led the suppression of the Warsaw Ghetto Uprising in 1943 and wrote the Stroop Report, a twelve-page account of the operation annexed with many original documents and pictures. Following the defeat of Germany, Stroop was prosecuted during the Dachau Trials and convicted of murdering nine U.S. prisoners of war. After his extradition to Poland, Stroop was tried, convicted, and executed for crimes against humanity.

== Early life ==
Josef Stroop (he applied to change his first name in 1938, which was authorized in 1941) was born in the Principality of Lippe, in the German Empire. His father, Konrad Stroop, was Lippe's chief of police. His mother, Katherine, was a homemaker. In a conversation with Kazimierz Moczarski while imprisoned in 1949, Stroop recalled his devoutly religious Roman Catholic mother as "a near fanatic", who subjected him to childhood physical abuse.

Both of his parents were enthusiastic monarchists. During parades in Detmold, Konrad Stroop often pointed out Leopold IV, Prince of Lippe and said, "Remember this always. This is our Prince. Obey him and serve him as I have." Young Josef's sense of German patriotism was fostered by growing up in the shadow of the Hermannsdenkmal.

Stroop enlisted in the Prussian Army in 1914 and served in several infantry regiments along the Western Front. He was wounded in action near La Bassée in October 1914. To the outrage of his devout mother, Stroop married Katharina, the daughter of a minister from the Protestant Church of Lippe, on 3 July 1923. Katharina Stroop remained a loyal and obedient wife despite her husband's many infidelities. Their marriage produced a daughter, Renate, in February 1928, and a son, Olaf, in February 1936.

During the early 1920s, Stroop joined the Tannenbergbund and embraced Germanic neo-paganism under the influence of General Erich Ludendorff and his wife Mathilde. He later recalled that Mathilde Ludendorff revealed "the truth about the Catholic Church in Germany and returned us to the true Germanic gods. By recalling the pure, pre-Germanic ways, she pointed out the rottenness of the Judeo-Christian ethic and showed how the organized Church had been strangling the Reich for twelve hundred years." Stroop further recalled, "It was thanks to what I was lucky enough to learn from her books that I was able to rid myself of religious prejudice and mark Gottgläubig in the column concerning belief."

In another conversation with Moczarski, Stroop called Catholicism "a catch-all of religions, infected with Judaism." He further claimed that Christianity was created as a Jewish conspiracy for "the weakening and debasement of man through guilt."

== SS career ==
Stroop joined the Nazi Party and SS in 1932. In 1933, he was appointed leader of the state auxiliary police. One year later, he was promoted from the rank of SS-Oberscharführer to SS-Hauptsturmführer. Subsequently, he worked for the SS administration in Münster and Hamburg.

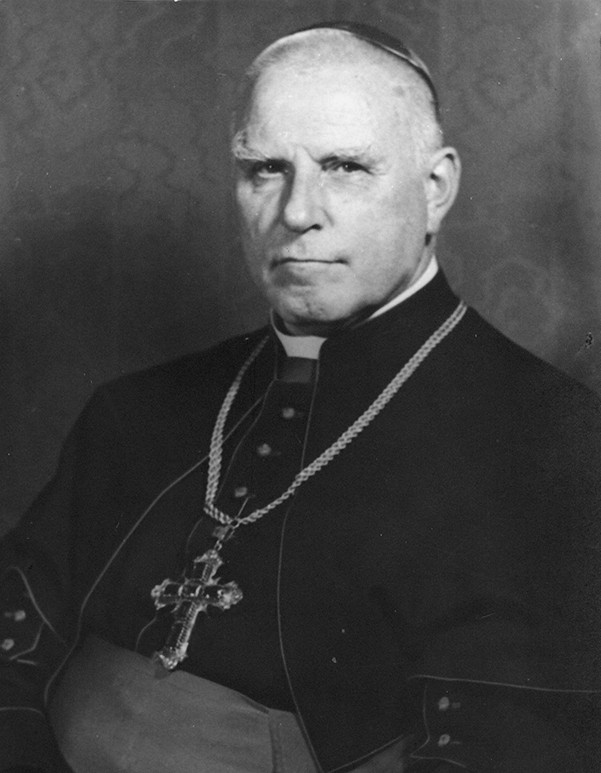
Bishop, later Cardinal, Count Clemens von Galen

In 1934, Bishop Clemens von Galen of Münster attacked the racist ideologies of the new regime, partly poking fun at it, partly critiquing its ideological basis as published by Alfred Rosenberg. He declared it unacceptable to refuse the Old Testament because of its Jewish authorship, and to limit morality and virtue to the perceived usefulness of a particular race.

In retaliation, Stroop and a von Galen family member of the SS made an official visit to the Bishop. Both were instructed to pressure the Bishop into approving Rosenberg's doctrines. If he refused, they were ordered to threaten him with the confiscation of Church property and an anti-Catholic propaganda campaign.

The visit began well, with the bishop commending Stroop's mother for her devout Catholicism and charitable work in Detmold. However, the Bishop turned the tables on his two visitors. He categorically refused to accept or praise Rosenberg's doctrines of euthanizing or forcibly sterilizing disabled people. To Stroop's further shock, the Bishop denounced the Nazis for trying to introduce Germanic neo-paganism into his diocese. He scoffed at marriage ceremonies and funerals conducted before altars dedicated to Wotan. Stroop, who attended such a ceremony only days before, was stunned that the bishop had learned of it so quickly.

At the end of the meeting, von Galen stated the Church would remain loyal to the State in all lawful matters. He expressed his deep love for Germany and reminded them he was the first Catholic Bishop to publicly acknowledge the new regime.

Stroop lamented the fact that von Galen's German patriotism "was tainted by Papist ideals, harmful to Germany for centuries. Besides, the Archbishop's orders came from outside the Fatherland, a fact which disturbed us. We all know, despite its diverse factions, the Catholic Church is a world community, which sticks together when the chips are down."

In September 1938, Stroop was promoted again, this time to the rank of SS-Standartenführer (colonel), and served near Reichenberg (Liberec), in the Sudetenland. In conversation with Moczarski, Stroop happily reminisced about his many visits to the hot springs at Karlsbad (Karlovy Vary). For this reason, their cellmate, Gustav Schielke, expressed disgust: instead of serving in combat, "Herr General did battle in spas."

=== Early World War II ===
After the German invasion of Poland, Stroop served as commander of the SS section in Gnesen (Gniezno). During the occupation of Poland, Stroop was transferred to Poznań as head of Selbstschutz, the notorious "self-defense" formation of the local ethnic Germans.

In May 1941, Stroop changed his forename from Josef to Jürgen for ideological reasons and in honor of his dead infant son. From 7 July to 15 September 1941, Stroop served in combat on the Eastern Front in the SS Division Totenkopf. He was awarded a Clasp to the Iron Cross 2nd Class and an Infantry Assault Badge in Bronze. On 16 September 1942, he was promoted to SS-Brigadeführer and assigned as an Inspector of the SiPo and SD of the Higher SS and Police Leader for Russia South until October 1942, when he took command of an SS garrison in Kherson before becoming the SS and Police Leader (SSPF) for Lemberg (Lviv) in February 1943. Stroop was SS inspector of Durchgangsstrasse IV, a large forced labor project to build a road from Lemberg to Stalino (now Donetsk).

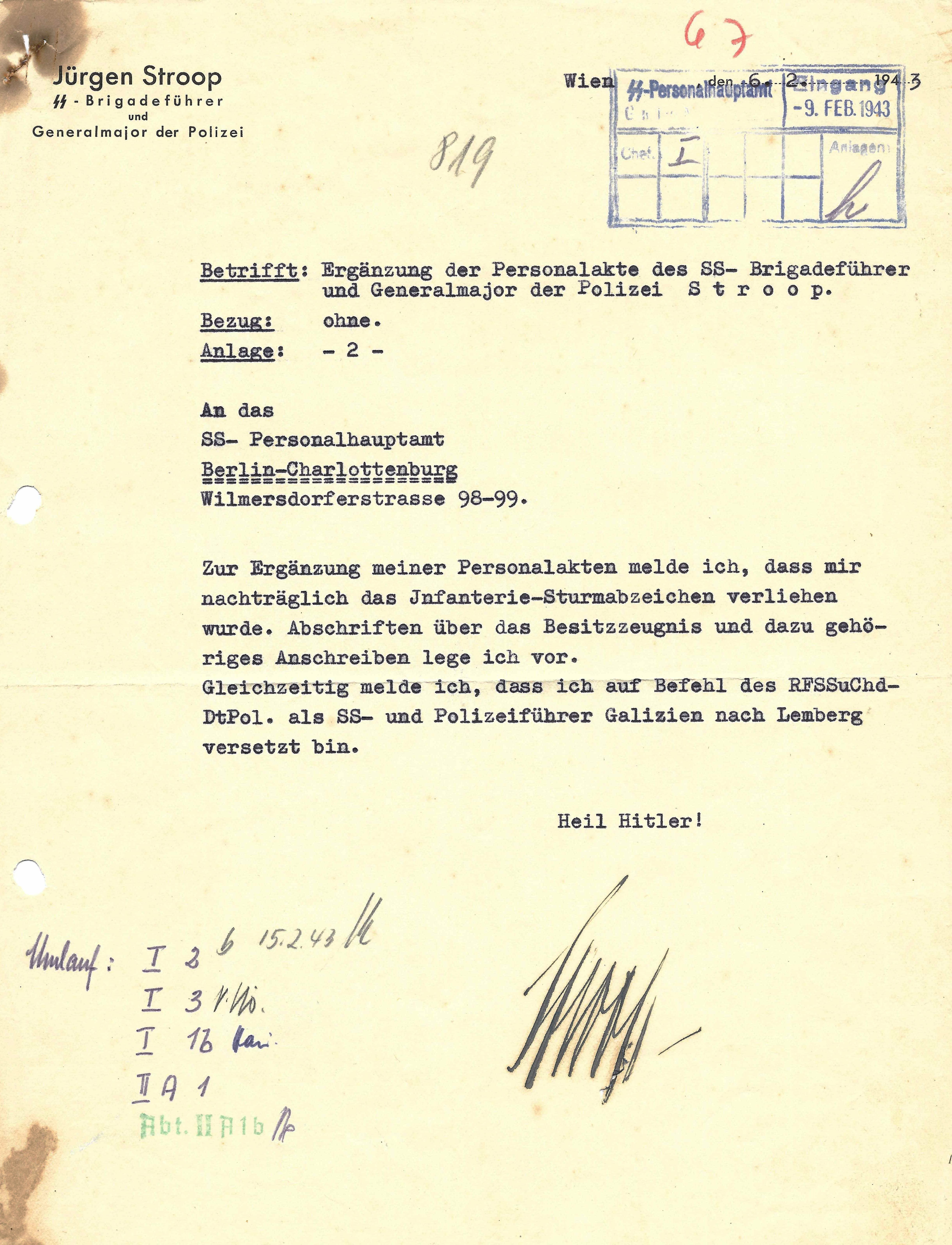
1943 Jurgen Stroop signed document for his personal Infantry Badge received earlier.

=== Suppression of the Warsaw Ghetto Uprising ===
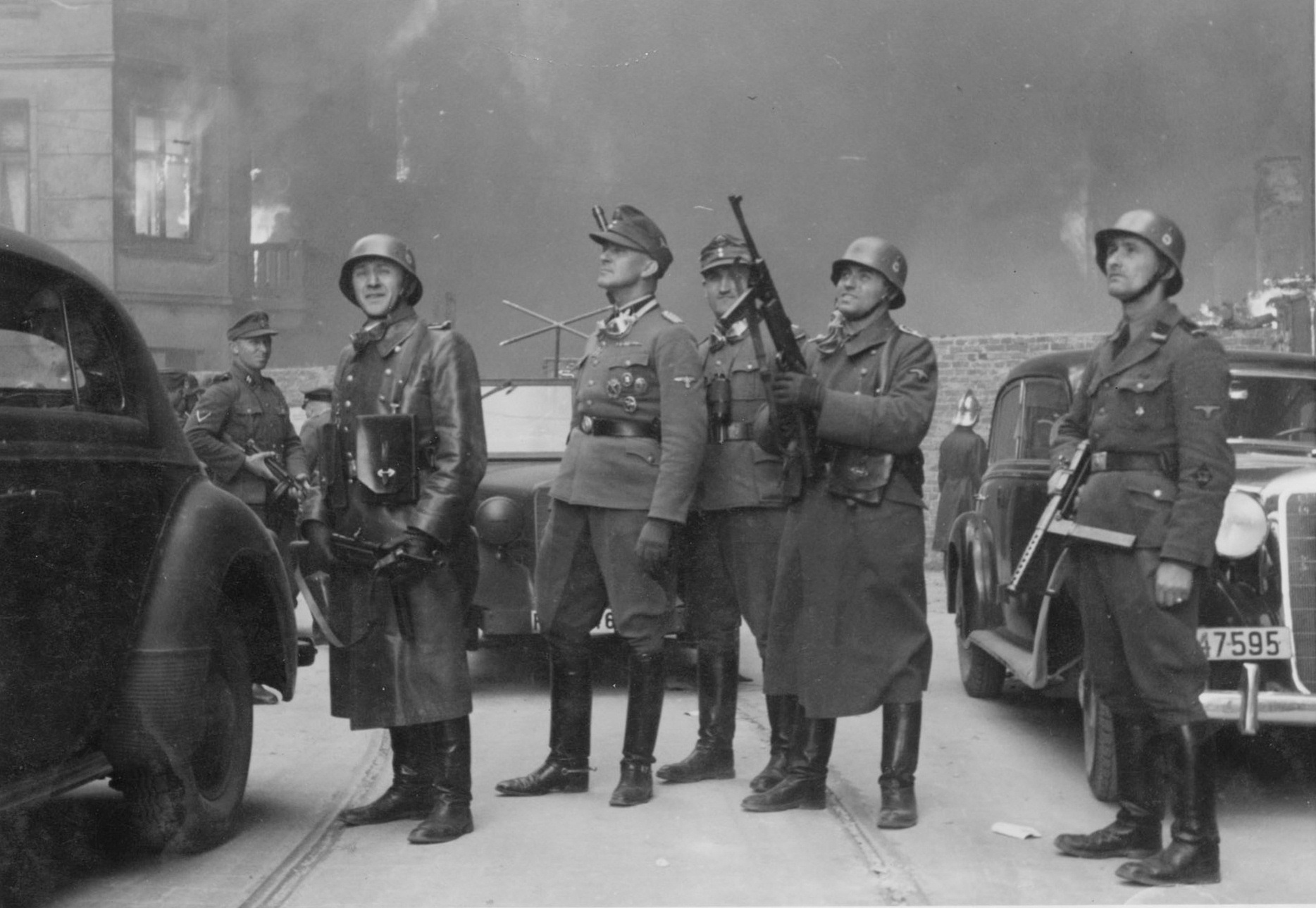
Brigadefuhrer Jürgen Stroop (center, in a field cap) with his men in the burning of Warsaw Ghetto, 1943

Stroop was involved in the month-long suppression of the Warsaw Ghetto Uprising, an action which cost the lives of just over 57,000 people. He was sent to Warsaw on 17 April 1943 by SS leader Heinrich Himmler, as a replacement for SS-Oberführer Ferdinand von Sammern-Frankenegg, who was relieved of duty. Stroop took over as SS and Police Leader of Warsaw from Sammern-Frankenegg on 19 April 1943 following the latter's failure to suppress the uprising. He commented to war crimes investigators:

I had two battalions of Waffen-SS, one hundred army men, units of Order Police, and seventy-five to a hundred Security Police people. The Security Police had been active in the Warsaw ghetto for some time, and during this program, it was their function to accompany SS units in groups of six or eight, as guides and experts in ghetto matters.

Stroop ordered the entire Ghetto to be systematically burned down and blown up, building by building. 57,065 of the survivors, including men, women, and children were either killed on the spot or deported for extermination. In conversation with Moczarski, Stroop described the destruction of the Ghetto in great detail. Stroop also disclosed that, unlike the men under his command, he always left the Ghetto at mealtimes and overnight.

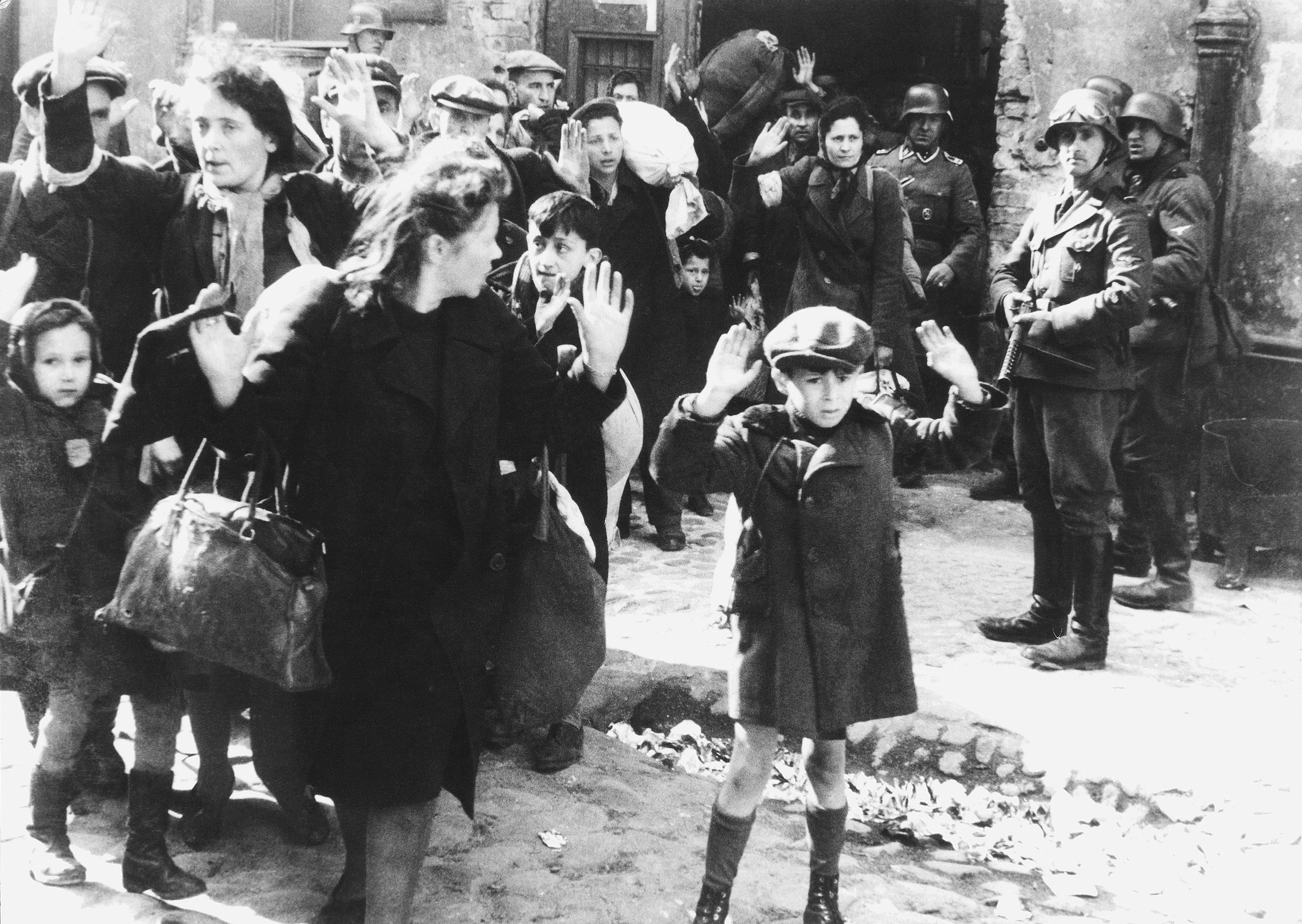
A well-known photograph showing the clearing of the Warsaw Ghetto in 1943

In his daily report 1 May 1943 Stroop reported: "Progress of large scale operation on 1 May 1943. Start 0900 hours. 10 searching parties were detailed, moreover a larger battle group was detailed to comb out a certain block of buildings, with the added instruction to burn that block down. Within this block of buildings there existed a so-called armament factory which had not yet been entirely evacuated, although it had had enough time to do so. It was not exempted from the operation. Today's operation a total of 1,026 Jews were caught, of whom 245 were killed, either in battle or while resisting. Moreover, a considerable number of bandits and ringleaders were also caught. In one case a Jew who had already been made ready for transport fired three shots against a 1st Lieutenant of Police, but missed his mark...". Nearly 6 years later Stroop recalled this shooting episode (quoted in the book Conversations with an Executioner by Kazimierz Moczarski):

May First was memorable for a number of reasons. I witnessed an extraordinary scene that day. A group of prisoners had been herded into the square. In spite of their exhaustion, many of them held their heads high. I stood nearby, surrounded by my escort. Suddenly I heard shots. A young Jew – in his midtwenties I'd guess – was firing a pistol at one of our police officers – one ... two ... three ... fast as lightning. One of the bullets hit the officer's hand. My men sprayed the Jew with fire. I managed to whip out my own pistol and hit him as he fell. As he lay dying, I stood over him, watching his life ebb away.

Stroop expressed confusion that the Ghetto's Jewish combatants, whom he viewed as Untermenschen, fought effectively against his men.

=== SS and Police Leader of Warsaw ===
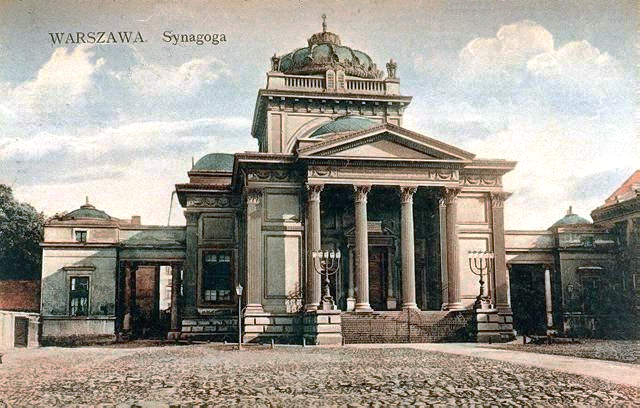
Great Synagogue of Warsaw, c. 1910

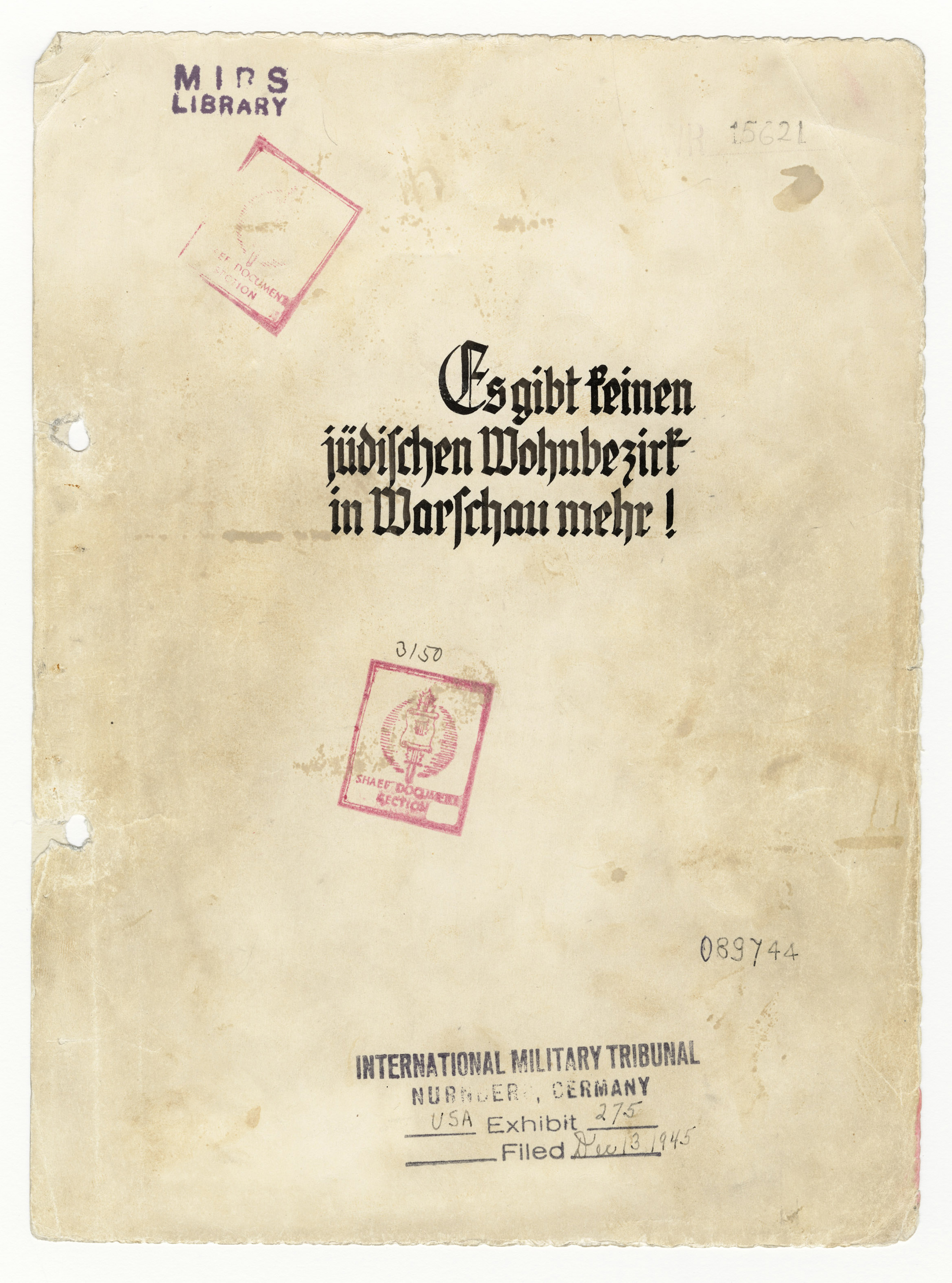
The cover page of the "American copy" of The Stroop Report with International Military Tribunal in Nuremberg markings

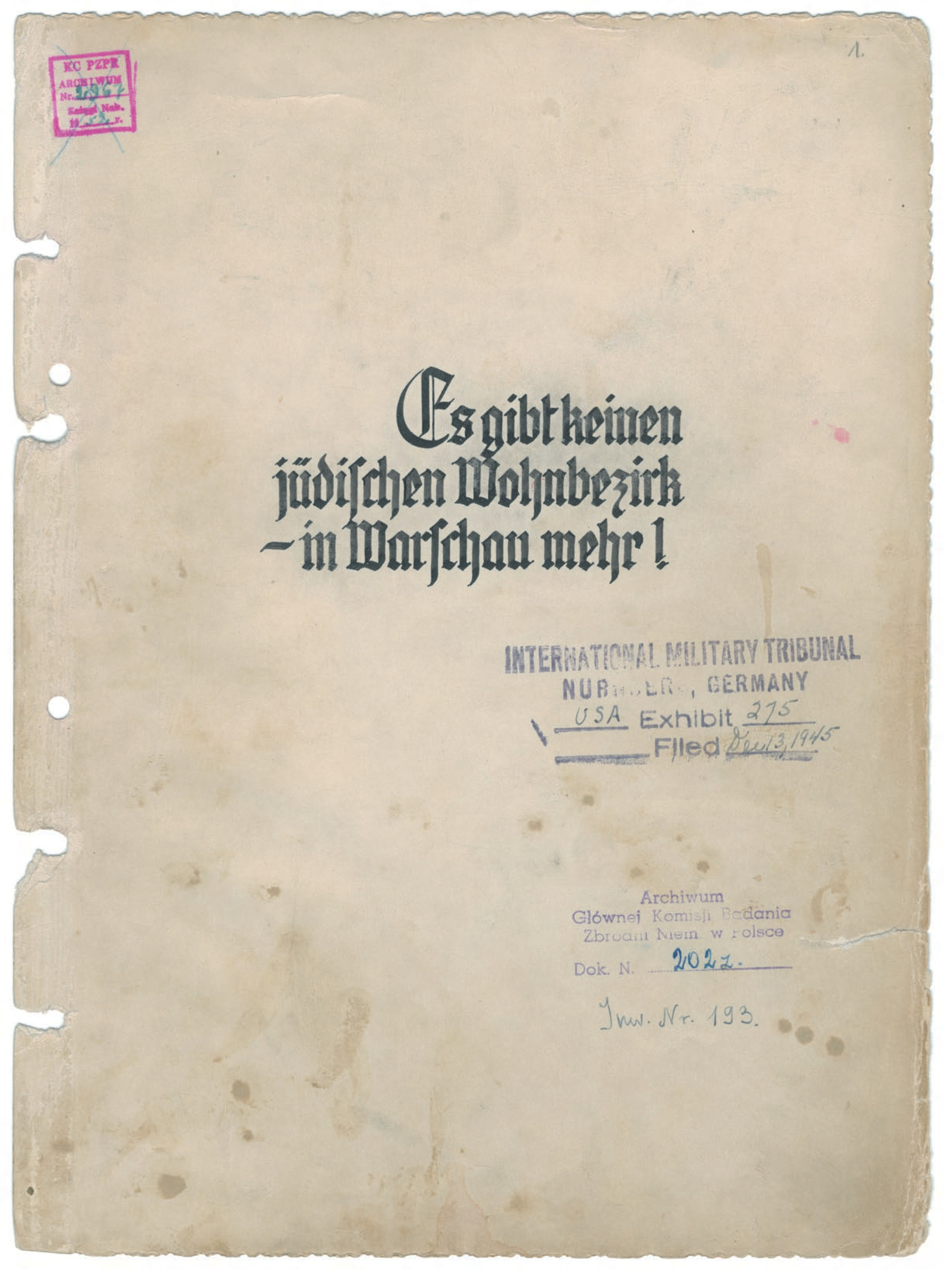
The second copy of The Stroop Report from the Institute of National Remembrance in Poland

After the suppression, Stroop ordered the destruction of Warsaw's Great Synagogue on May 16, 1943. Stroop's description was quoted in Conversations with an Executioner:

What a marvelous sight it was. A fantastic piece of theater. My staff and I stood at a distance. I held the electrical device which would detonate all the charges simultaneously. Jesuiter called for silence. I glanced over at my brave officers and men, tired and dirty, silhouetted against the glow of the burning buildings. After prolonging the suspense for a moment, I shouted: Heil Hitler and pressed the button. With a thunderous, deafening bang and a rainbow burst of colors, the fiery explosion soared toward the clouds, an unforgettable tribute to our triumph over the Jews. The Warsaw Ghetto was no more. The will of Adolf Hitler and Heinrich Himmler had been done.

Stroop continued in his position as SS and Police Leader of Warsaw. Krüger presented an Iron Cross 1st Class to him on 18 June 1943 for the Warsaw Ghetto "action" at a gala reception in Warsaw's Łazienki Park. Stroop's detailed 75-page report on the suppression of the Warsaw Ghetto Uprising was bound in black leather. Stroop detailed the capture/and or killing of 57,065 Warsaw Ghetto inmates while German forces had 110 casualties [17 dead/93 wounded]. It included copies of all communiqués and many photographs; two separate copies were sent to SS Police Leader East Friedrich-Wilhelm Krüger and Heinrich Himmler while Stroop kept a copy as well as an unbound file copy. Titled The Jewish Quarter of Warsaw is no more!, it would later be used as evidence at the Nuremberg Trials.

=== Occupied Greece ===
In September 1943, Stroop was named the Higher SS and Police Leader (HSSPF) in Greece. On 16 October, the government of Ioannis Rallis published a decree which put the Security Battalions, Hellenic Gendarmerie and City Police under Stroop's orders. The local civilian administration found his methods and behavior unacceptable, and withdrew cooperation, forbidding the local Order Police from having anything to do with him, which made his position untenable. Consequently, he was removed and replaced by Walter Schimana, and on 9 November, was appointed Commander of SS-Oberabschnitt Rhein-Westmark (an SS administrative district named for the Rhine and Gau Westmark) in Wiesbaden, serving there until the close of the war.

=== Plot of 20 July 1944 ===
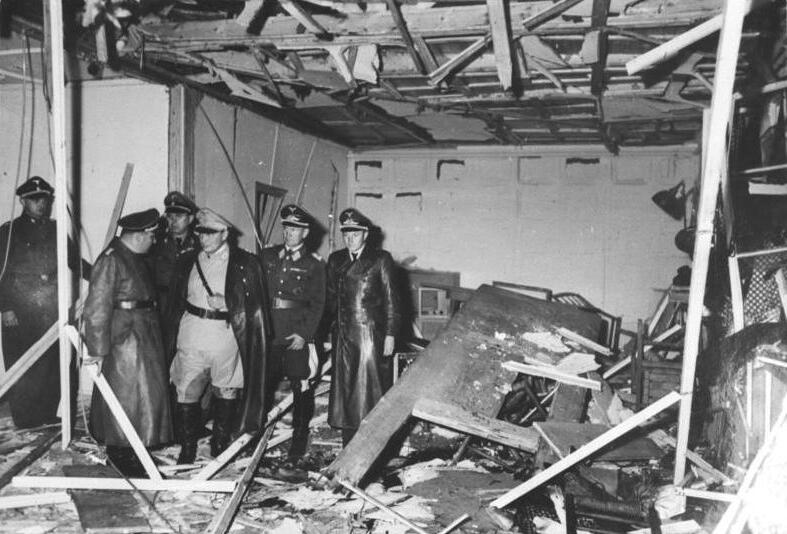
The conference room at the Wolf's Lair after Claus von Stauffenberg's attempt on Hitler's life

According to Moczarski, no subject enraged Stroop more than the 20 July plot against Adolf Hitler. Whenever the subject came up, Stroop cursed those involved, "in unprintable terms," as a "murderous band of generals and Jew-ridden civilians." Stroop blamed Germany's defeat on Germans: "A few weaklings poisoned by enemy agents and infected with subversive ideologies were all it took to undermine us. The minute we suffered military defeats, the cancerous elements in our society swung into action, organizing Mafias and creating 'patriotic discussion groups.' In the end, they destroyed our nation."

Stroop proudly related his involvement in the purge of anti-Nazi Germans following the plot's failure. He expressed annoyance that Field Marshal Erwin Rommel should have been allowed to commit suicide rather than being hanged from a meat hook. He also praised Roland Freisler of the Volksgerichtshof as "a fine judge." Stroop also boasted about his participation in dealing with Field Marshal Günther von Kluge for his involvement in the plot. As General Wilhelm Burgdorf did with Rommel, Stroop claimed to have offered the Field Marshal a choice between suicide and a show trial before Judge Freisler. To Stroop's outrage, Kluge demanded his day in court. Stroop then claimed he shot Kluge in the head. Himmler announced the death of the Field Marshal was a suicide.

=== Murder of US prisoners of war ===
Between October 1944 and March 1945, nine airmen of the United States Army Air Forces were summarily executed after they were shot down and captured in Stroop's district. They were Sergeant Willard P. Perry, Sergeant Robert W. Garrison, Private Ray R. Herman, Second Lieutenant William A. Duke, Second Lieutenant Archibald B. Monroe, Private Jimmie R. Heathman, Lieutenant William H. Forman, and Private Robert T. McDonald.

After Moczarski reminded him the killing of POWs was defined as criminal under the Hague and Geneva Conventions, Stroop responded, "It was common knowledge American flyers were terrorists and murderers who used methods contrary to civilized norms ... We were given a statement to that effect from the highest authorities. It was accompanied by an order from Heinrich Himmler." As a result, he explained, all nine POWs were taken to the forest and given "a ration of lead for their American necks."

=== End of the war ===
In late March 1945, Stroop was forced to retreat from Wiesbaden as the advancing U.S. Army crossed the Rhine bridgeheads. Upon his arrival in Pottenstein, Bavaria, Stroop received word Himmler wished to meet him in Berlin. On 14 April, Stroop met Himmler in his private train near Prenzlau. With a pass signed by Himmler, Stroop traveled to the Alpine Redoubt with a group of teenaged Hitler Youth members he was training for war. To obtain gasoline and other scarce supplies, Stroop showed Himmler's signed order and claimed to be transporting his Werwolf unit to build an Alpine bastion for the salvation of the Reich.

However, after a secret conference at Taxenbach, Austria, Stroop and his fellow Werwolf commanders decided to change into Wehrmacht uniforms and surrender to the Western Allies. Soon after, Stroop abandoned his Werwolf unit near Kufstein and fled north. On 10 May 1945, Stroop surrendered to the American forces in the village of Rottau, Bavaria.

Stroop told Moczarski he was carrying a cyanide tablet, which he intended to take if captured. After Moczarski asked him his reasons for not taking it, Stroop replied, "It's really quite simple. I was afraid." At the time he surrendered, Stroop carried forged discharge papers made out to a Wehrmacht Captain of Reserve Josef Straup. He kept to this story for nearly two months, before admitting his identity on 2 July 1945.

== Trial at Dachau ==
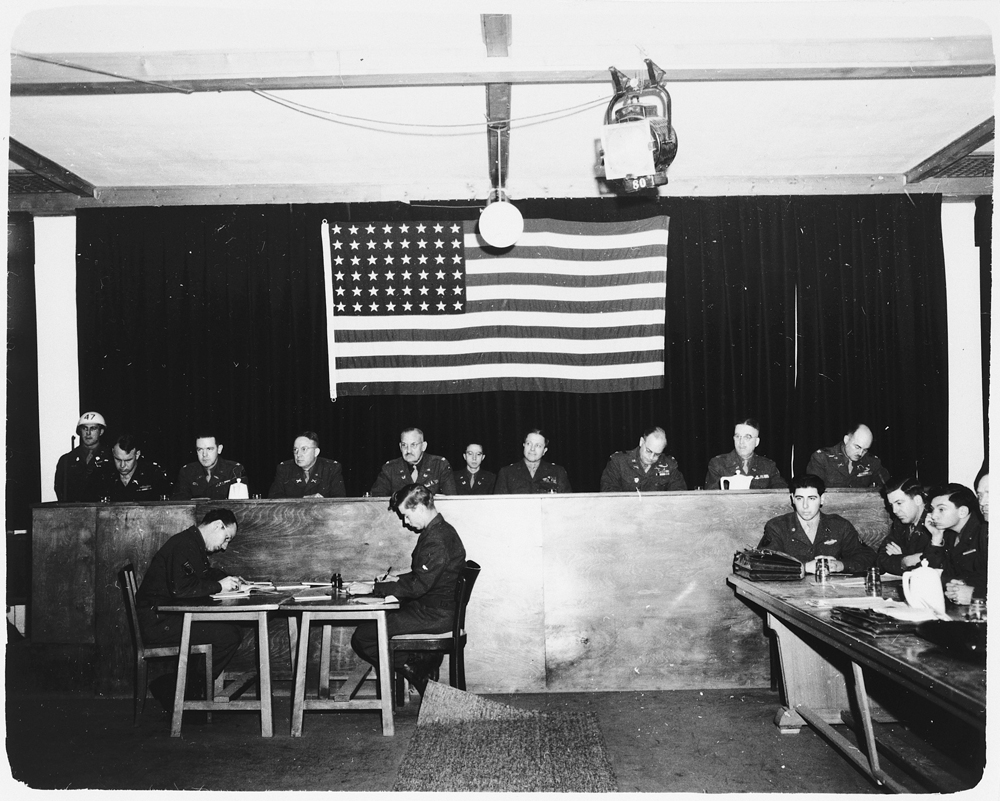
Judicial Bench, Dachau Trials.

In the case of U.S. vs. Jurgen Stroop, et al, the former General and 21 of his subordinates were prosecuted by the U.S. Military Tribunal at Dachau for the "liquidation" of the nine U.S. POWs executed in his district and for being a member of the SS. Lieutenant Colonel William Dwinnel, a U.S. Army lawyer from Brooklyn, New York appeared for the prosecution. Brigadier General Emil C. Kiel of the United States Army Air Forces was assigned as the trial's judge. Stroop later called Kiel "a cunning devil," and expressed a belief the General was Jewish.

In conversation with Moczarski, Stroop lamented, "Nearly all of those judges were Jews or Freemasons. I studied them very closely. Most of them had dark hair." He further lamented one of his U.S. Army defense lawyers was wearing a Masonic ring in court. According to Gustav Schielke, his cellmate:

Stroop behaved like a swine in the dock. He acted innocent as a lamb, pretending the killings were news to him. Because of his incriminations, several fellow defendants were sentenced to death, as many as thirteen of the twenty-two. As senior commander of the SS and police, he gave all the orders, Herr Moczarski, yet he stated in court his underlings killed the American airmen. How could a top German officer act like that?

After an eight-week trial, Kiel sentenced Stroop to death by hanging on 21 March 1947. As for his codefendants, one was acquitted, one escaped and was never tried, 12 of them received death sentences, and the other 7 received prison terms ranging from three to 15 years. In November 1947, a death warrant was signed by General Lucius D. Clay. By then, however, Stroop had been extradited to Warsaw. Three of his condemned codefendants had their death sentences reduced to prison terms, while the other nine were executed by hanging at Landsberg Prison in 1948.

In late May 1947, Stroop was flown to Berlin-Tempelhof Airport, and extradited to the People's Republic of Poland. He was extradited with Erich Muhsfeldt. He recalled, "My heart sank when I saw those Polish officers at Tempelhof. So, the Americans were liars after all! They promised me time and again I'd never be given to the Communists and my death sentence for killing the U.S. airmen would be commuted to life imprisonment."

== Trial in Warsaw and execution ==
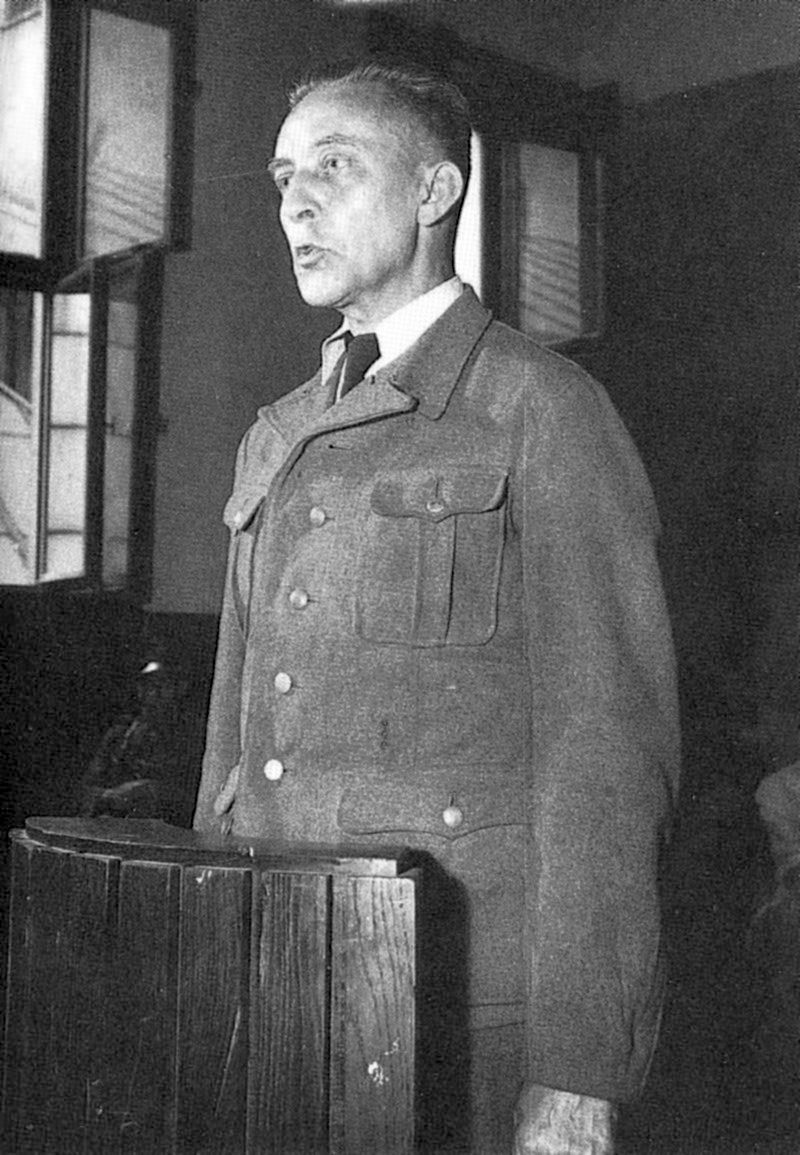
Stroop before a Polish court in 1951

Stroop's trial began on 18 July 1951 at the Warsaw Criminal District Court and lasted three days. He was tried at the same time as Franz Konrad who had been responsible for the requisition of Jewish assets in the Warsaw Ghetto. The trial was intended to include Hermann Höfle as co-defendant and so try the main culprits of the deportation, exploitation and liquidation of the Ghetto, but Hofle managed to escape to Italy and avoid extradition to Poland. Stroop stood accused of four crimes:

1. Belonging to the SS, a criminal organization.
2. Liquidating the Warsaw Ghetto, leading to the murder of more than 50,000 people and deporting hundreds of thousands of other Jews to the death camps.
3. Ordering the shooting of one hundred Poles on 16 July 1943.
4. Participating in the mass murder of Polish civilians in the Warthegau.

On 23 July 1951, the Court sentenced Stroop and Konrad to death by hanging. In passing sentence, the Court declared,

Since the character and magnitude of Stroop's crimes, his attitude and his twisted explanations not only indicate a total lack of repentance but actually confirm that he retains his Nazi view of the world, the Court is unable to find the slightest extenuating circumstance in the accused Stroop's conduct. His actions show that he is a being devoid of human feeling, a Fascist hangman who tracked his victims with cold and relentless cruelty, an executioner who must be removed from the society of man.

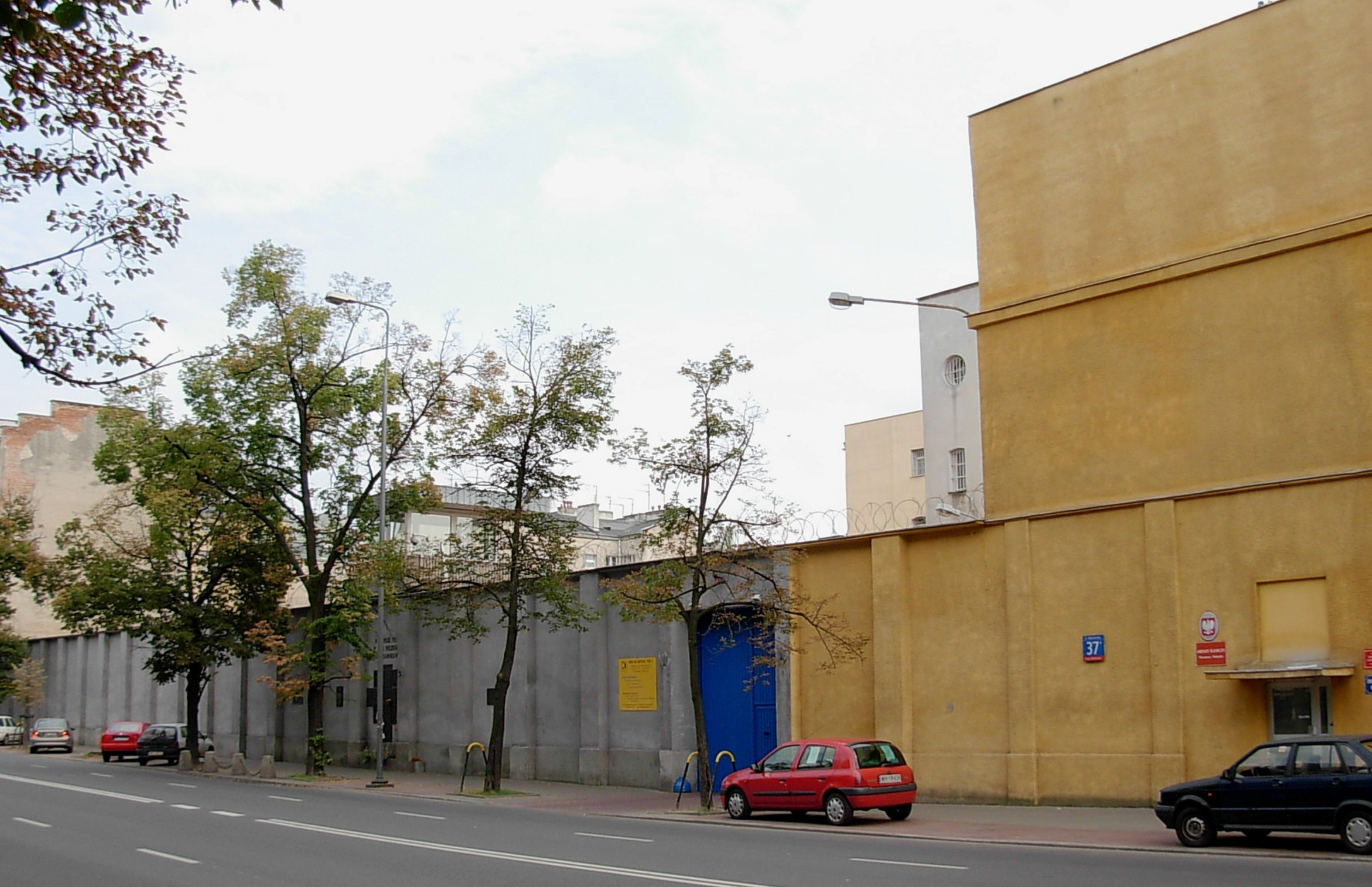
Warsaw's Mokotów Prison in 2007

Stroop was hanged at Mokotów Prison at 7 p.m. 6 March 1952. In 1961, Moczarski wrote to the Procurator General of the Polish Republic and received a letter about Stroop's last moments. According to the Procurator's letter, Stroop was calm, "exhibiting his usual arrogance", in the day before his hanging. He expressed no "last wish". Several days before the hanging, the prison director asked Stroop whether he could reconcile his conscience with the fact he murdered women and children in the Ghetto and watched others do so at his orders; he replied he felt no guilt about killing Jews. Stroop did not utter a word about Germany, Hitler, or future revenge.

== Conversations with an Executioner ==
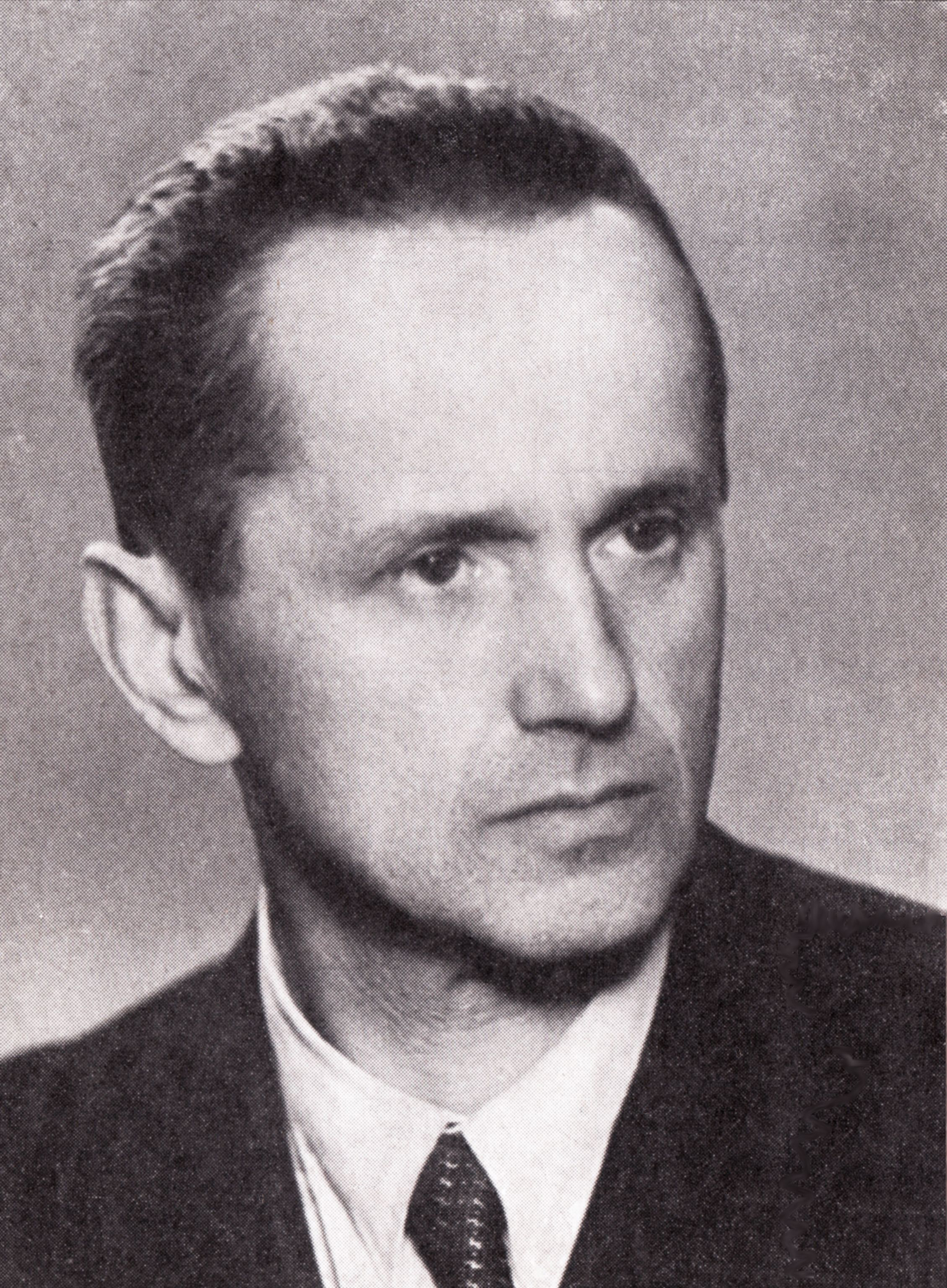
Kazimierz Moczarski (1907–1975)

While awaiting trial in Warsaw's Mokotów Prison, Stroop spent 255 days in a cell with Kazimierz Moczarski, a former officer in the pre-war Polish Army and his co-accused, SS-Untersturmfuhrer Gustav Schielke. Moczarski, under the codename Maurycy, served in Poland's anti-Nazi and anti-Soviet resistance movement, the Armia Krajowa (AK) in World War II. By the time they met, he had been incarcerated for more than three years after communist judges sentenced him on 18 January 1946.

Moczarski was ordered by the AK to assassinate Stroop for crimes against the Polish Nation during his tenure as SS and Police Leader of Warsaw. Due to the unpredictability of Stroop's movements, Moczarski was unable to carry out the mission. Following the Soviet-led transformation of Poland into a Marxist-Leninist police state, Moczarski was arrested and tortured by the Polish Ministry of State Security, spending four years on death row before his release in 1956.

During their incarceration, Stroop opened-up in detail about his life. He also shared with Moczarski his letters from his mother, wife, and children in West Germany. Moczarski recalled: "The letters from his mother Stroop gave me to read ... seemed to indicate Frau Stroop did not view as crimes the acts for which Stroop is jailed."

Moczarski collected notes and wrote a memoir about his 255-day incarceration from 2 March 1949 until 11 November 1949 in one cell with Stroop after his release from prison and re-habilitation in 1956 during the anti-Stalinist Polish October. His first draft was written in secrecy. Fifteen years after his ordeal ended, Moczarski published his memoir in installments in the Polish magazine Odra monthly in 1972–74. He did not witness the publication of his work in book form. The first shortened book version was released in 1977, two years after Moczarski's death. The full text without communist censorship was published in 1992 after the collapse of the Soviet Union, by Polish Scientific Publishers PWN. Moczarski died 27 September 1975 in Warsaw, weakened by the years of physical torture endured during his communist 'interrogations' by the UB secret police.

The book titled Rozmowy z katem, with excerpts published in newspapers and magazines during his lifetime, was translated and published in English as Conversations with an Executioner by Prentice-Hall in 1981, hardcover, and has been translated into several languages. On 18 April 2012, Philip Boehm's stage adaptation of Moczarski's memoir premiered at the Upstream Theater in St. Louis, Missouri, US.

== See also ==
- List SS-Gruppenführer
- Ludwig Hahn who participated in the destruction and evacuation of the Warsaw Ghetto
