= Austrian State Prize for European Literature =

Austrian literature award

The Austrian State Prize for European Literature (German: Österreichischer Staatspreis für Europäische Literatur), also known in Austria as the European Literary Award (Europäischer Literaturpreis), is an Austrian literary prize awarded by the Federal Chancellery for Arts, Culture, and Media to European writers. Established in 1965, the prize is endowed with a purse of 25,000 € (As of 2022). The prize was not awarded in 1969. It is awarded on the Salzburg Festival.

== List of winners ==
| Year | Writer | Country |
|---|---|---|
| 1965 | Zbigniew Herbert | Poland |
| 1966 | W. H. Auden | United Kingdom |
| 1967 | Vasko Popa | Yugoslavia |
| 1968 | Václav Havel | Czechoslovakia |
| 1969 | Not awarded | — |
| 1970 | Eugène Ionesco | Romania |
| 1971 | Peter Huchel | East Germany |
| 1972 | Sławomir Mrożek | Poland |
| 1973 | Harold Pinter | United Kingdom |
| 1974 | Sándor Weöres | Hungary |
| 1975 | Miroslav Krleža | Yugoslavia |
| 1976 | Italo Calvino | Italy |
| 1977 | Pavel Kohout | Czechoslovakia |
| 1978 | Simone de Beauvoir | France |
| 1979 | Fulvio Tomizza | Italy |
| 1980 | Sarah Kirsch | East Germany |
| 1981 | Doris Lessing | United Kingdom |
| 1982 | Tadeusz Różewicz | Poland |
| 1983 | Friedrich Dürrenmatt | Switzerland |
| 1984 | Christa Wolf | East Germany |
| 1985 | Stanisław Lem | Poland |
| 1986 | Giorgio Manganelli | Italy |
| 1987 | Milan Kundera | Czechoslovakia |
| 1988 | Andrzej Szczypiorski | Poland |
| 1989 | Marguerite Duras | France |
| 1990 | Helmut Heissenbüttel | Germany |
| 1991 | Péter Nádas | Hungary |
| 1992 | Salman Rushdie | United Kingdom/India |
| 1993 | Chinghiz Aitmatov | Kyrgyzstan |
| 1994 | Inger Christensen | Denmark |
| 1995 | Aleksandar Tišma | FR Yugoslavia |
| 1996 | Jürg Laederach | Switzerland |
| 1997 | Antonio Tabucchi | Italy |
| 1998 | Dubravka Ugrešić | Netherlands/Croatia |
| 1999 | Péter Esterházy | Hungary |
| 2000 | António Lobo Antunes | Portugal |
| 2001 | Umberto Eco | Italy |
| 2002 | Christoph Hein | Germany |
| 2003 | Cees Nooteboom | Netherlands |
| 2004 | Julian Barnes | United Kingdom |
| 2005 | Claudio Magris | Italy |
| 2006 | Jorge Semprún | Spain |
| 2007 | A. L. Kennedy | United Kingdom |
| 2008 | Agota Kristof | Hungary |
| 2009 | Per Olov Enquist | Sweden |
| 2010 | Paul Nizon | Switzerland |
| 2011 | Javier Marías | Spain |
| 2012 | Patrick Modiano | France |
| 2013 | John Banville | Ireland |
| 2014 | Lyudmila Ulitskaya | Russia |
| 2015 | Mircea Cărtărescu | Romania |
| 2016 | Andrzej Stasiuk | Poland |
| 2017 | Karl Ove Knausgård | Norway |
| 2018 | Zadie Smith | United Kingdom |
| 2019 | Michel Houellebecq | France |
| 2020 | Drago Jančar | Slovenia |
| 2021 | László Krasznahorkai | Hungary |
| 2022 | Ali Smith | United Kingdom |
| 2023 | Marie NDiaye | France |
| 2024 | Joanna Bator | Poland |
| 2025 | Serhiy Zhadan | Ukraine |
