= Andrzej Kunert =

Polish historian and lecturer

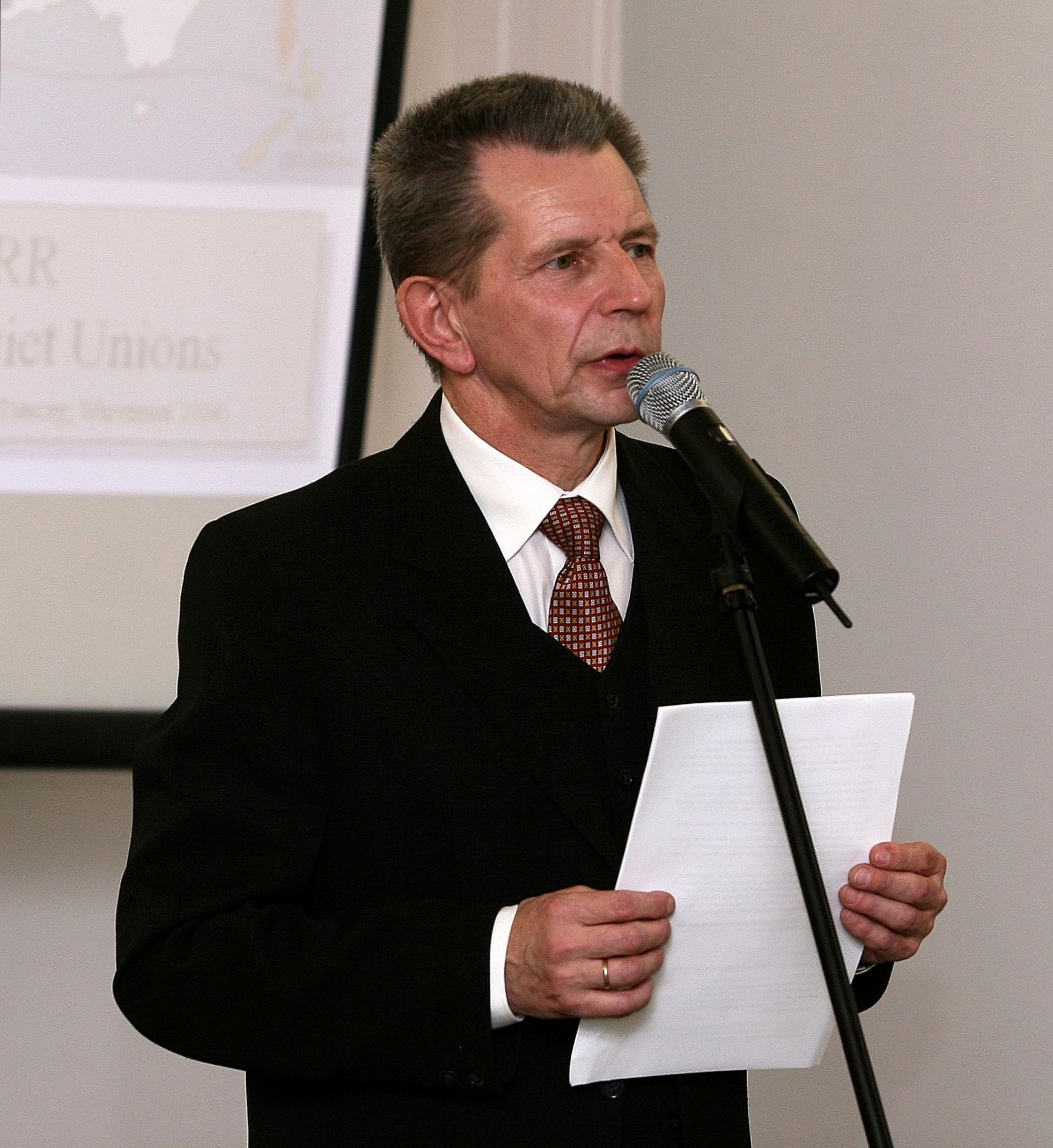
Andrzej Kunert in 2009

Andrzej Krzysztof Kunert (born 12 October 1952 in Warsaw) is a Polish historian and lecturer, specializing in the history of Polish resistance movement in World War II. Since April 2010 he is the secretary general of the Council for the Protection of Struggle and Martyrdom Sites.

== Career ==
Kunert graduated from the Institute of History of the University of Warsaw. In 1984-1990 he worked in the publishing house of the PAX Association. After the fall of communism, he worked as editor-in-chief of Bellona publishing house, and in the Museum of Polish Army. In 2002 he received a doctoral degree of historical science from the University of Zielona Góra. On 25 September 2009 he was awarded the Officer's Cross of the Order of Polonia Restituta.

On 16 April 2010, Kunert was named as the secretary general of the Council for the Protection of Struggle and Martyrdom Sites, succeeding Andrzej Przewoźnik, who died during the Polish Air Force crash six days earlier.

== Works ==
- Wrzesień 1939 (1993)
- Ilustrowany przewodnik po Polsce Podziemnej: 1939-1945 (1996)
- Lista strat kultury polskiej 1939-1945 (1998)
- Żołnierskie epitafia : 1914-1918, 1918-1921, 1939-1945 (as editor, 1999)
- Rozkazy Naczelnych Wodzów Polskich Sił Zbrojnych 1939-1945 (as editor, 2002)
- Żydzi polscy w służbie Rzeczypospolitej 1939-1945 (as editor, 2002)
- Polskie wigilie wojenne 1939-1945 (as editor, 2003)
- Osiem misji kuriera z Warszawy (as editor, 2005)
- Oskarżony Kazimierz Moczarski (2006)
- Bitwa o Monte Cassino w poezji 1944-1969: "Nasze granice w Monte Cassino..." (as editor, 2007)
- 1939 - Polska była pierwsza (2009)
- Katyń - ocalona pamięć (2010)
