= State Publishing Institute PIW =

Polish publishing house

The State Publishing Institute PIW (Polish: Państwowy Instytut Wydawniczy, PIW) is a Polish publishing house founded in Warsaw by the Polish state after World War II, in 1946.

PIW specializes in literature, history, philosophy, and the social sciences.

One of its more popular literary series, published since 1968, Współczesna Proza (Contemporary Prose), includes award-winning novels in translation by writers such as Umberto Eco, Gabriel García Márquez, Vladimir Nabokov, Isaac Bashevis Singer, Kurt Vonnegut, and Günter Grass.

Państwowy Instytut Wydawniczy also publishes a popular series of biographies of famous individuals, as well as encyclopedic works.

As of 2011 its president was Rafał Skąpski.
