= Andrzej Szczypiorski =

Polish writer

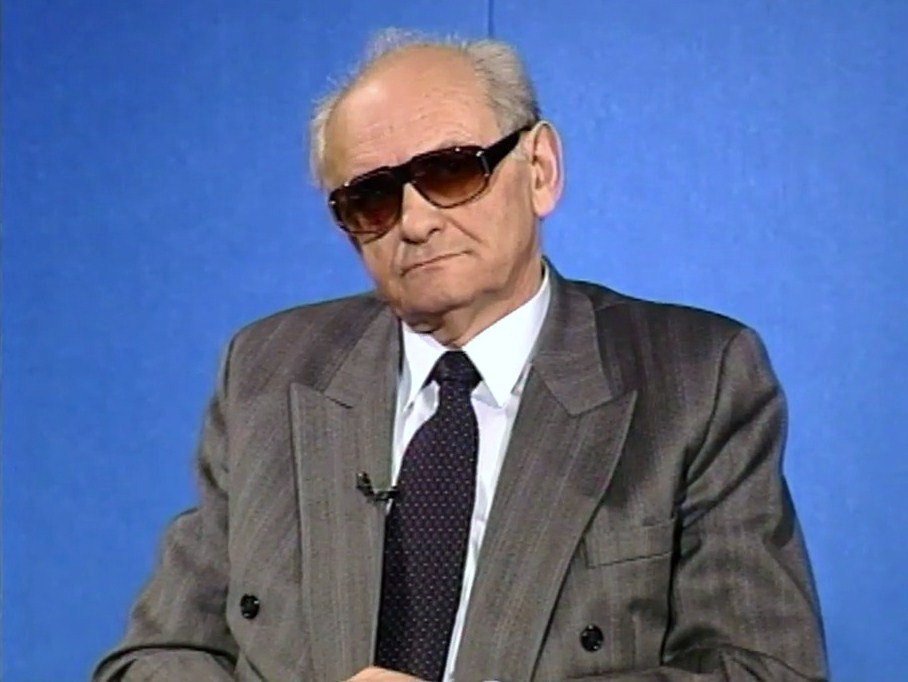
- Szczypiorski in 1994
- Born: 3 February 1928; Warsaw, Poland
- Died: 16 May 2000 (aged 72); Warsaw, Poland
- Occupations: novelist, politician, diplomat
- Writing career
- Genres: novel, short story
- Notable work: A Mass for Arras (pl.: Msza za miasto Arras)

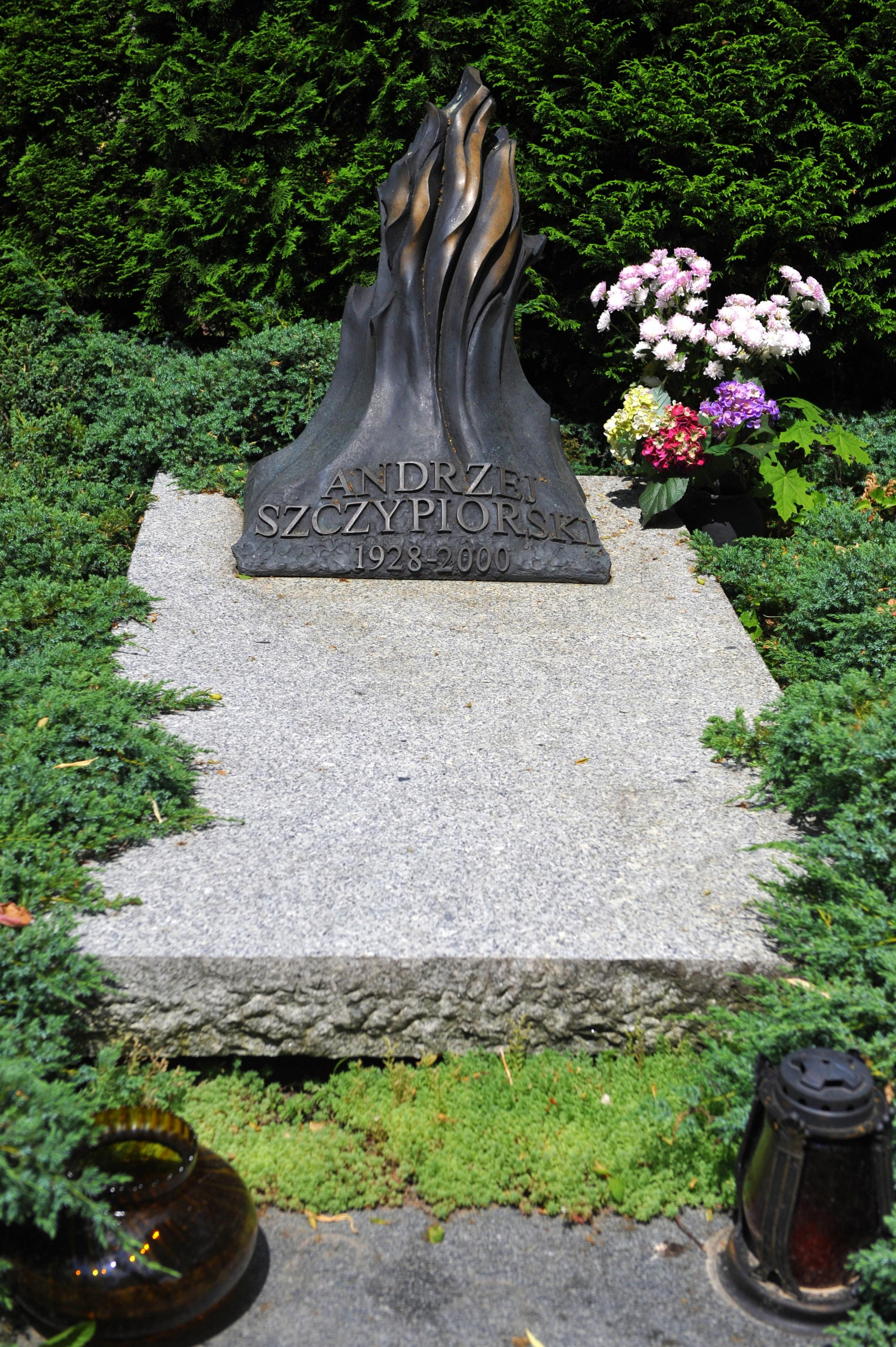
Andrzej Szczypiorski's grave at the Evangelical Reformed Cemetery in Warsaw

Andrzej Szczypiorski (pronounced [ˈandʐɛj ʂt͡ʂɨˈpjɔrskʲi]; 3 February 1928 – 16 May 2000) was a Polish novelist and politician. He served as a member of the Polish legislature, and was a Solidarity activist interned during the military crackdown of 1981. He was a secret police agent in the 1950s.

== Life ==
He was son of Adam Szczypiorski, a political activist, historian and mathematician, and Jadwiga née Epsztajn. Szczypiorski had a sister Wiesława (1924–1945). He spent his childhood in Warsaw.

During World War II Szczypiorski studied at an underground university called the "flying university" due to the regular changing of its location for safety. He was a partisan of the Polish People’s Army, and a participant of the Warsaw Uprising. After the Uprising he was arrested and condemned to imprisonment at the Sachsenhausen concentration camp, where he survived until 1945.

In 1946–1947 he studied political science in the Warsaw Consular Diplomatic Academy. In 1948–1956, Szczypiorski worked as an editor in the Katowice Silesian Theater. During this period, in 1952, he made his literary debut in the magazine "Życie Literackie" using the pseudonym 'Maurice S. Andrews' and was inducted into the Polish Writers' Union. He won the Austrian State Prize for European Literature in 1988.

In 1956–1958, he was selected to serve in the Polish Embassy to Denmark, after which he returned to work as an editor on the radio and for publications. He later served as a member of the Polish legislature. He was also a UNICEF Goodwill Ambassador. Prior to his death, Szczypiorski converted to Calvinism, and is buried in the Protestant Reformed Cemetery in Warsaw.

After his death it became known that Szczypiorski was a collaborator of the Polish communist secret police in the years of Stalinism in Poland.

== Publications ==
- 1961: Czas przeszły (The Past Time), Iskry, Warsaw.
- 1966: Podróż do krańca doliny (Journey to the End of the Valley), Iskry, Warsaw.
- 1967: Karol Świerczewski – Walter. W 20 rocznicę śmierci, ZG ZBoWiD, Krajowa Komisja Dąbrowszczaków: „Sport i Turystyka”, Warsaw.
- 1968: Niedziela, godzina 21.10: wybór felietonów radiowych, 1964–1967, Czytelnik, Warsaw.
- 1971: Msza za miasto Arras, Czytelnik, Warsaw.
- 1980: Trzej ludzie w bardzo długiej podróży (Three People On A Very Long Journey), Czytelnik, Warsaw.
- 1983: Z notatnika stanu wojennego, Polonia, London.
- 1986: Początek (The Origin; also published in english with the title 'The Beautiful Mrs Seidenman'), Instytut Literacki, Paris.
- 1990: Amerykańska whiskey i inne opowiadania (American Whiskey and Other Stories), Kantor Wydawniczy SAWW, Poznań.
- 1991: Noc, dzień i noc (Night, Day and Night), Kantor Wydawniczy SAWW, Poznań.
- 1994: Autoportret z kobietą (Autoportrait with a Woman), Kantor Wydawniczy SAWW, Poznań.
- 1999: Gra z ogniem (Playing with Fire), Sens, Poznań.

== Awards and honours ==
- 1972: Polish PEN-Club Prize
- 1988: Austrian State Prize for European Literature
- 1989: Nelly Sachs Prize
- 1994: Herder Prize
- 1995: Pour le Mérite for Sciences and Arts
- 1995: Order of Merit of the Federal Republic of Germany
- 1997: Order of Polonia Restituta by the President of the Republic for his services to Poland

== See also ==
- Polish literature
- List of Polish writers
