= Szmul Zygielbojm Monument =

Sculpture in Warsaw, Poland

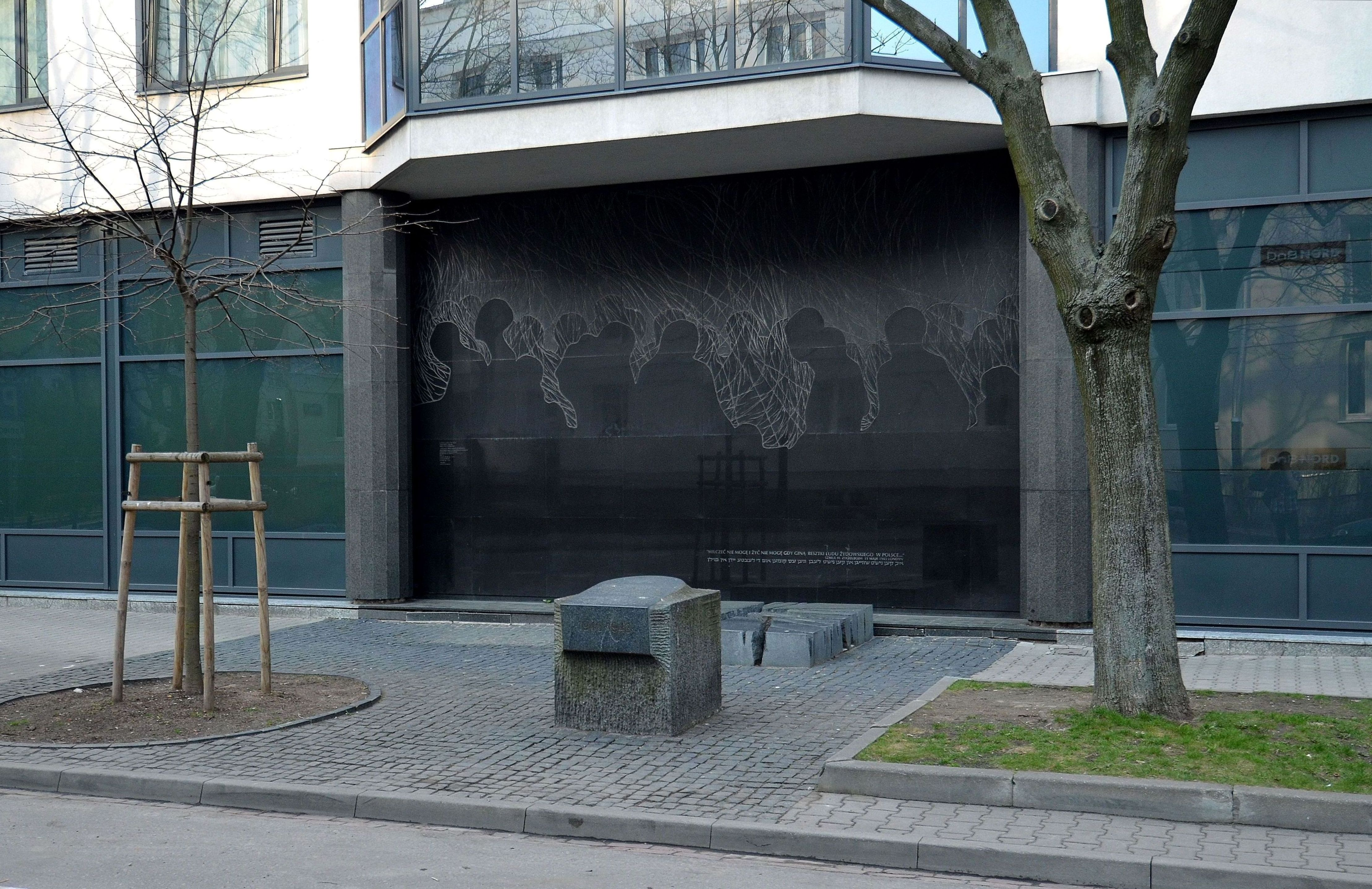
- The monument in 2013.
- Interactive map of Szmul Zygielbojm Monument
- Location: 6 Lewartowskiego Street, Downtown, Warsaw, Poland
- Coordinates: 52°15′04.04″N 20°59′36.86″E
- Designer: Marek Moderau
- Type: Sculpture
- Material: Granite, syenite
- Opening date: 22 June 1997
- Dedicated to: Szmul Zygielbojm

The Szmul Zygielbojm Monument (Polish: Pomnik Szmula Zygielbojma) is a memorial sculpture in Warsaw, Poland, placed at 6 Lewartowskiego Street, at the corner with Zamenhofa Street, within the neighbourhood of Muranów of the Downtown district. It is dedicated to Szmul Zygielbojm, a 20th-century politician and activist of the General Jewish Labour Bund, whom, while a member of the National Council of Poland in London, has committed a suicide in 1943, as a protest against Allied inaction towards the Holocaust. The monument was designed by Marek Moderau, and unveiled on 22 June 1997. It consists of two sculptures, a short block of a lightgray granite broken into several cracked pieces on the pavement, and a syenite wall featuring human silhouettes and flames.

== History ==
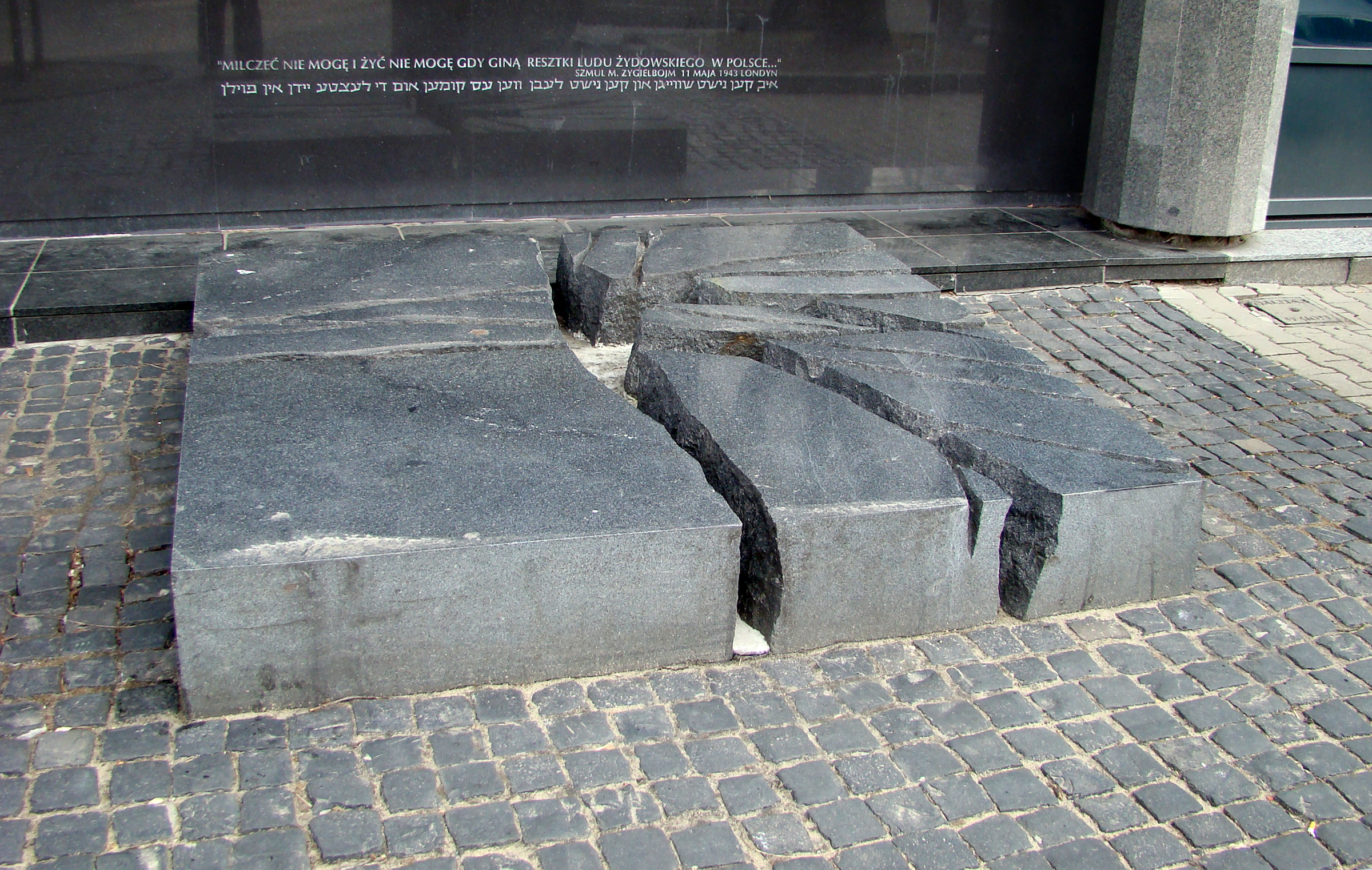
The pavement sculpture of the monument.

The monument was designed by Marek Moderau, and unveiled on 22 June 1997, on the 55th anniversary of the beginning of the great deportation operation in the Warsaw Ghetto. It was dedicated to Szmul Zygielbojm, a 20th-century politician and activist of the General Jewish Labour Bund, whom, while a member of the National Council of Poland in London, has committed a suicide in 1943, as a protest against Allied inaction towards the Holocaust.

== Design ==
The monument includes a short block of a lightgray granite broken into several cracked pieces, and installed on the pavement. Behind it, the building wall includes a syenite board featuring human silhouettes and flames. At the bottom, it has an inscription Polish and Yiddish, with portion of text from Zygielbojm's suicide letter. It reads:

Polish inscription:
„Milczeć nie mogę i żyć nie mogę, gdy giną resztki ludu żydowskiego w Polsce…”
Szmul M. Zygielbojm
11 maja 1943 Londyn

Yiddish inscription:
איך קען נישט שווייגן און קען נישט לעבן ווען עס קומען אום די לעצטע יידן אין פוילן

English translation:
"I cannot stay silent, and I cannot live, when the remains of the Jewish people are dying in Poland…"
Szmul M. Zygielbojm
11 May 1943 London

The monument is part of the Memorial Route of Jewish Martyrdom and Struggle, leading from the intersection of Anielewicza and Zamenhofa Streets and the Monument to the Ghetto Heroes, to the Umschlagplatz Monument. As part of it, in front of the sculpture is placed a syenite block, with the following inscription in Polish and Hebrew:

Polish inspiration:
Szmul Zygielbojm 1895−1943, przedstawiciel Bundu w Radzie Narodowej R.P. w Londynie; na znak protestu wobec bierności rządów państw sprzymierzonych w obliczu zagłady Żydów w getcie warszawskim 12 maja 1943 odebrał sobie życie.

Hebrew inscription:
שמואל זיגלבוים (1895 – 1943), נציג הבונד במועצה הלאומי[ת] של ממשלת פולין הגולה בלונדון. ב-12 במאי 1943 איבד עצמו לדעת במחאה על אדישותן של ממשלות בעלות הברית להשמדת היהודים בגטו וארשה

English translation:
Szmul Zygielbojm 1895-1943, representative of the Bund in the National Council of the Republic of Poland in London; as a sign of protest against the passivity of the Allied governments in the face of the extermination of Jews in the Warsaw Ghetto, he took his own life on 12 May 1943.
