= Memorial Route of Jewish Martyrdom and Struggle =

Memorial Route of Jewish Martyrdom and Struggle in Warsaw (1940-1943)
- Trakt Pamięci Męczeństwa i Walki Żydów w Warszawie
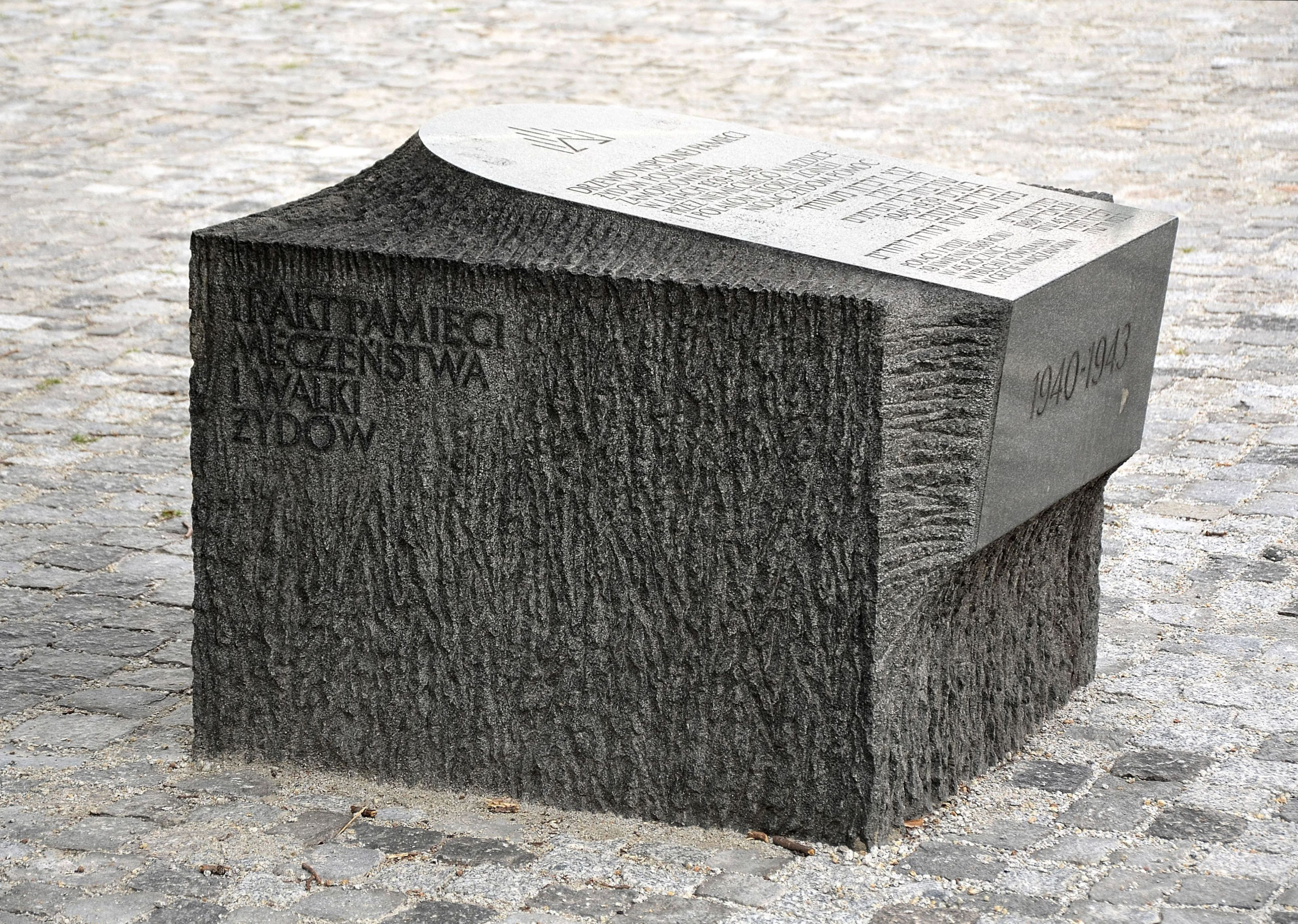
- One of the seventeen blocks of the Memorial Route
- Interactive map of Memorial Route of Jewish Martyrdom and Struggle in Warsaw (1940-1943)
- Location: Warsaw, Poland
- Coordinates: 52°14′56.7888″N 20°59′42.3636″E
- Designer: Zbigniew Gąsior, Stanisław Jankowski, Marek Moderau
- Completion date: 18 April 1988 (1989, 1995, 1997)

The Memorial Route of Jewish Martyrdom and Struggle in Warsaw is located the Muranów district to commemorate people, events and places of the Warsaw Ghetto during the German occupation of Poland.

The memorial route begins at the Warsaw Ghetto Monument in the corner of ul. Zamenhofa and ul. Anielewicza and leads the visitor along a path of markers ending at the ul. Stawki near the Umschlagplatz Monument.

== See also ==
- Warsaw Ghetto boundary markers
