= Umschlagplatz Monument =

Monument in Warsaw, Poland

Coordinates: 52°15′08″N 20°59′21″E

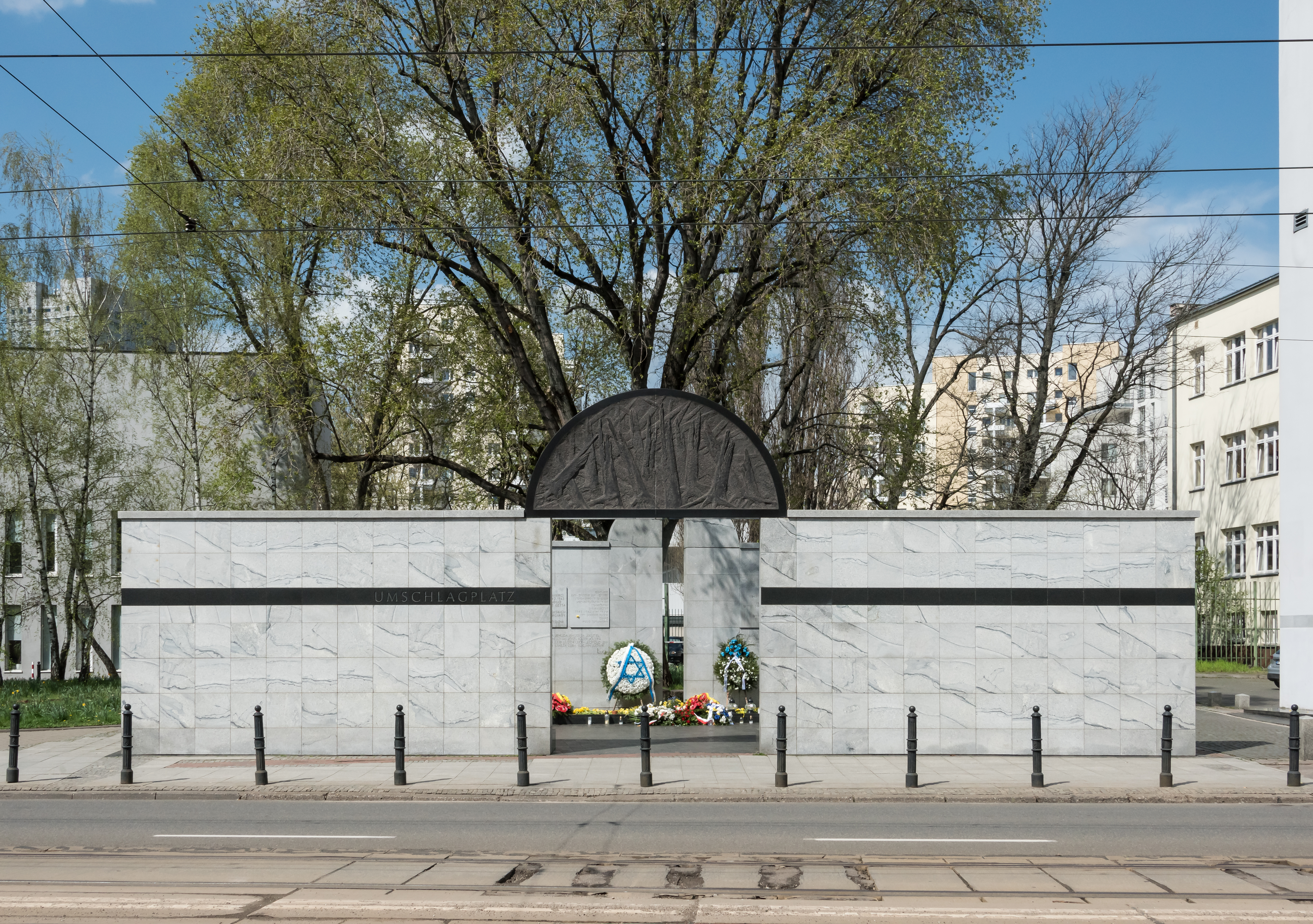
Umschlagplatz Monument in Warsaw

The Umschlagplatz Monument (full name: Umschlagplatz Monument-Wall) is a monument located in Warsaw at Stawki Street, in the former loading yard, where from 1942 to 1943 Germans transported over 300,000 Jews from the Warsaw Ghetto to the death camp in Treblinka and other camps in the Lublin district.

== Description ==
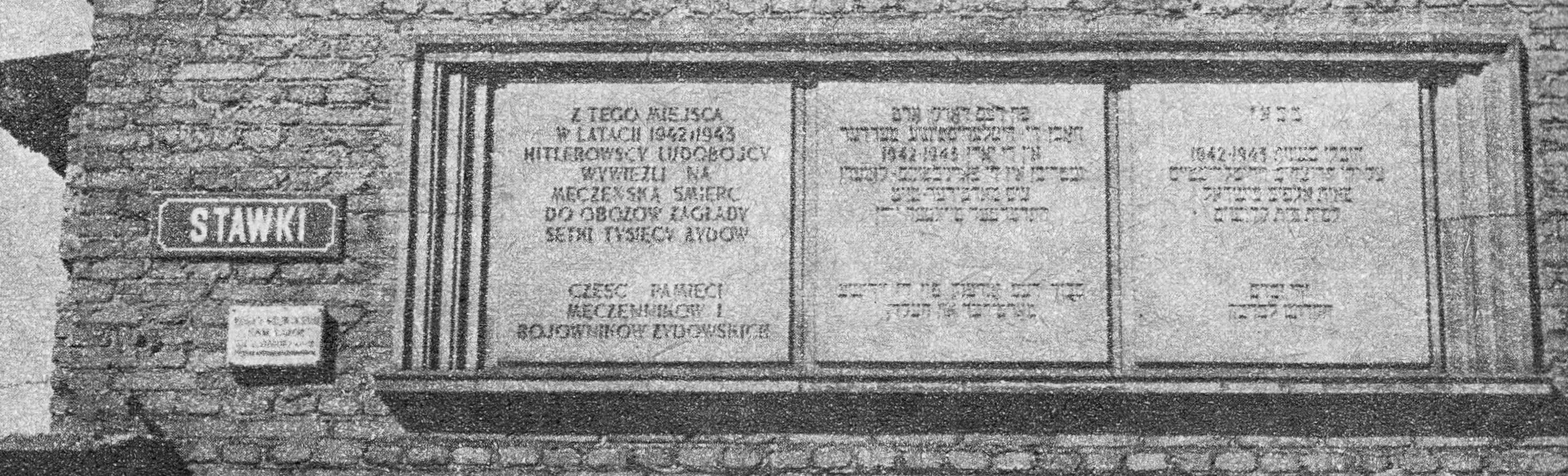
First post-war commemoration of Umschlagplatz

The monument was unveiled on April 18, 1988, on the eve of the 45th anniversary of the outbreak of the Ghetto Uprising. It was designed by Hanna Szmalenenberg and Władysław Klamerus. The monument has a form of a white four-metre wall with a black strip on the front wall, which is a reference to the colours of the Jewish ritual robes. The space surrounded by the wall, on a rectangular plan of 20 × 6 metres, symbolizes an open railway wagon. 400 most popular Polish and Jewish names were engraved on the inner wall of the monument in alphabetical order, from Aba to Żanna. The names highlight several hundred years of coexistence of the two nations in Warsaw and the overlapping of their cultures and religions. Each name also symbolically commemorates a thousand victims of the Warsaw Ghetto. In the central part of the wall there are four stone boards with inscriptions in Polish, Yiddish, English and Hebrew that read as follows:

Between 1942 and 1943, more than 300,000 Jews from the ghetto that had been established in Warsaw went to the Nazi death camps along this path of suffering.

The gate to the commemoration area is topped with a semi-circular black matzevah-like plaque carved from a syenite block donated by the Swedish Government and society. A relief depicting a shattered forest (in Jewish funerary art, a broken tree means a premature, violent death) symbolizes the annihilation of the Jewish nation. On the axis of the wide main gate there is also a second gate – a narrow vertical clearance crowned with a cut matzevah, through which you can see a tree, which grew behind the monument after the war. The tree is a symbol of hope. The axial position of those two gates is to symbolize the transition from death to the hope of life.

On the side wall of the building adjoining the monument (before the war no. 8, now no. 10) is a quotation from the Book of Job in Polish, Yiddish and Hebrew: "O earth, cover not thou my blood, and let my cry have no place." (Job 16, 18). The inscriptions intersect the contours of two windows and doors. From the edge of Stawki Street, between the main body of the monument and the school wall, runs a lightly sloping path – the road of death – where Jews were driven to the railway ramp for the transport to Treblinka. The road was paved with black basalt cubes as part of the monument.

On the back wall of the monument, the names of its creators and founders were carved.

The monument is the end of the Memorial Route of Jewish Martyrdom and Struggle, unveiled on the same day, starting at the crossroads of Anielewicza and Zamenhofa Streets and leading along Zamenhofa, Dubois and Stawki Streets.

On June 11, 1999, during his seventh apostolic journey to Poland, John Paul II prayed for the Jewish nation at this commemoration place.

In 2002, the monument, a fragment of a loading yard and two adjacent buildings (before the war Stawki St. 4/6 and 8, now no. 10) were entered into the register of historical monuments.

In 2007–2008, the monument was completely renovated as it was in a poor condition due to the characteristics of materials used for its construction. At that time, white marble panels "Biała Marianna" were replaced with cladding made of grey granite from Zimnik, Lower Silesia, which is more resistant to weather conditions. According to the design by Hanna Szmalenberg and Teresa Murak, the square around the monument was crossed by a clay-gravel path, and from the intersection of Stawki and Dzikia Streets into the square a narrow wavy strip of blue hyssop flowers (the colour of the Israeli flag) was planted.

Since 2012, to commemorate the victims of the displacement from the Warsaw Ghetto in 1942, the Memorial March of July 22, organized by the Jewish Historical Institute, begins at the monument.

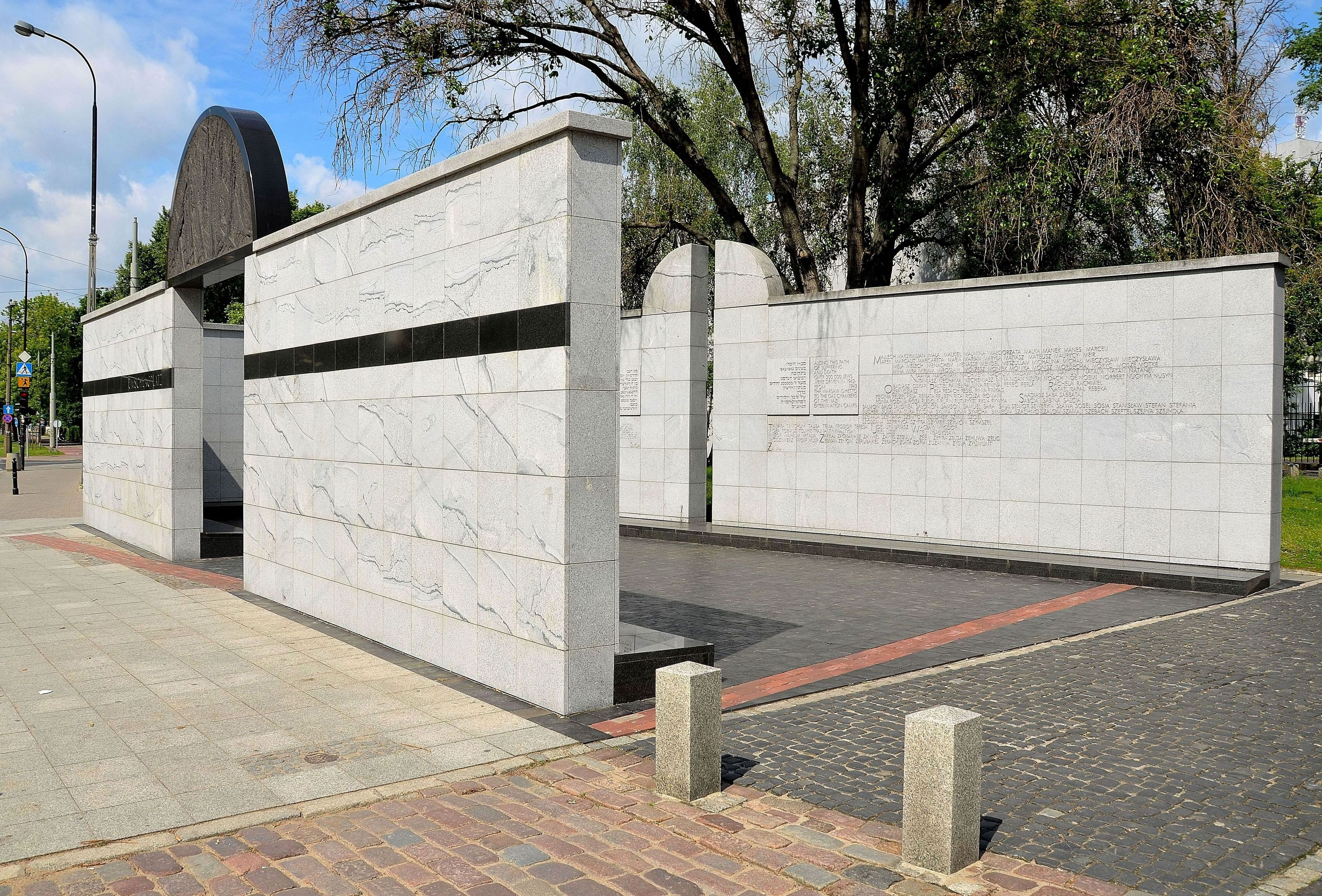
The walls of the monument surround a fragment of the former Umschlagplatz from three sides. The way of death in the foreground.

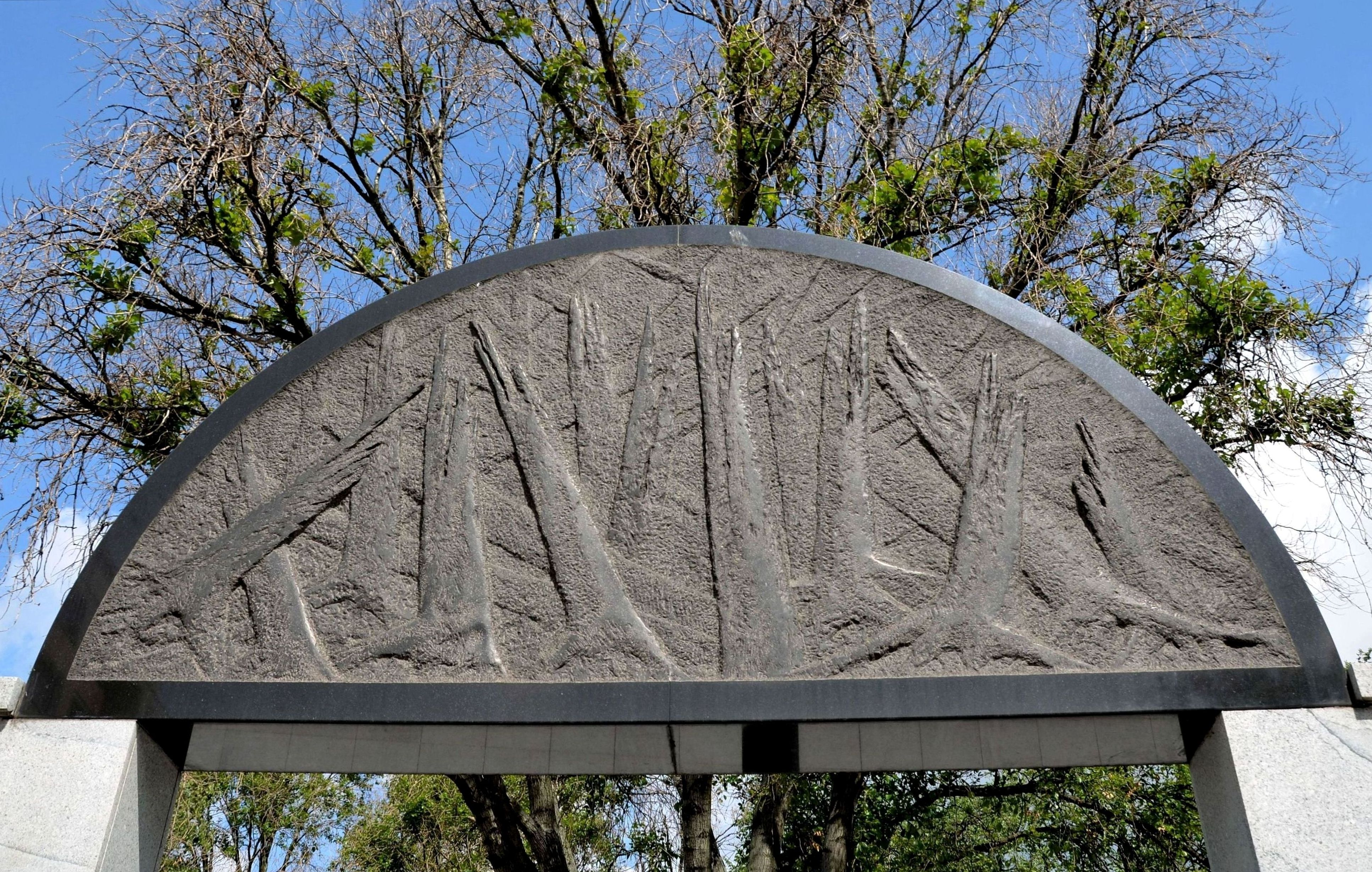
A syenitic block above the entrance with a symbol of shattered trees.

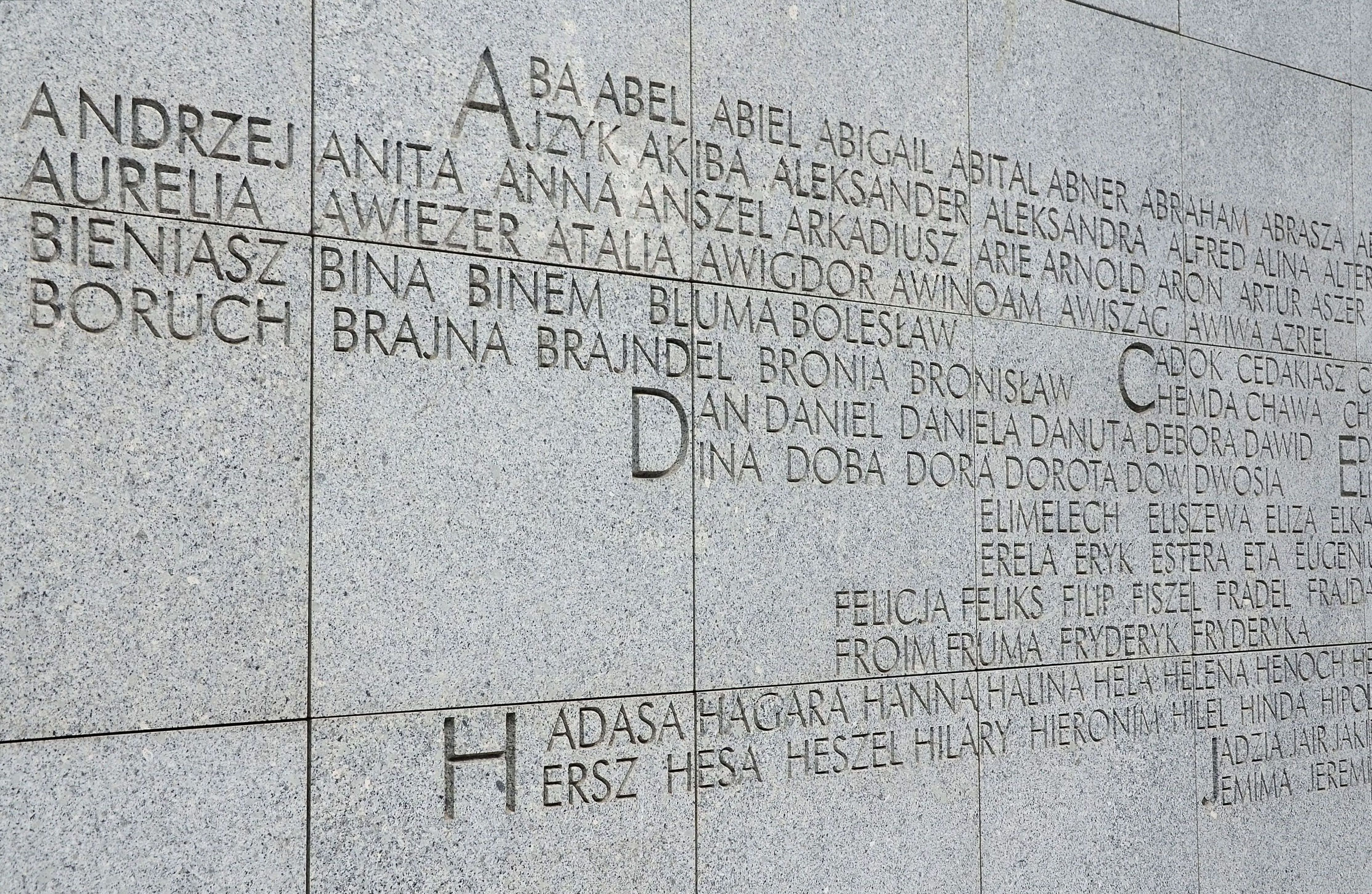
Names engraved on the wall of the monument.

== First commemoration of the Umschlagplatz ==
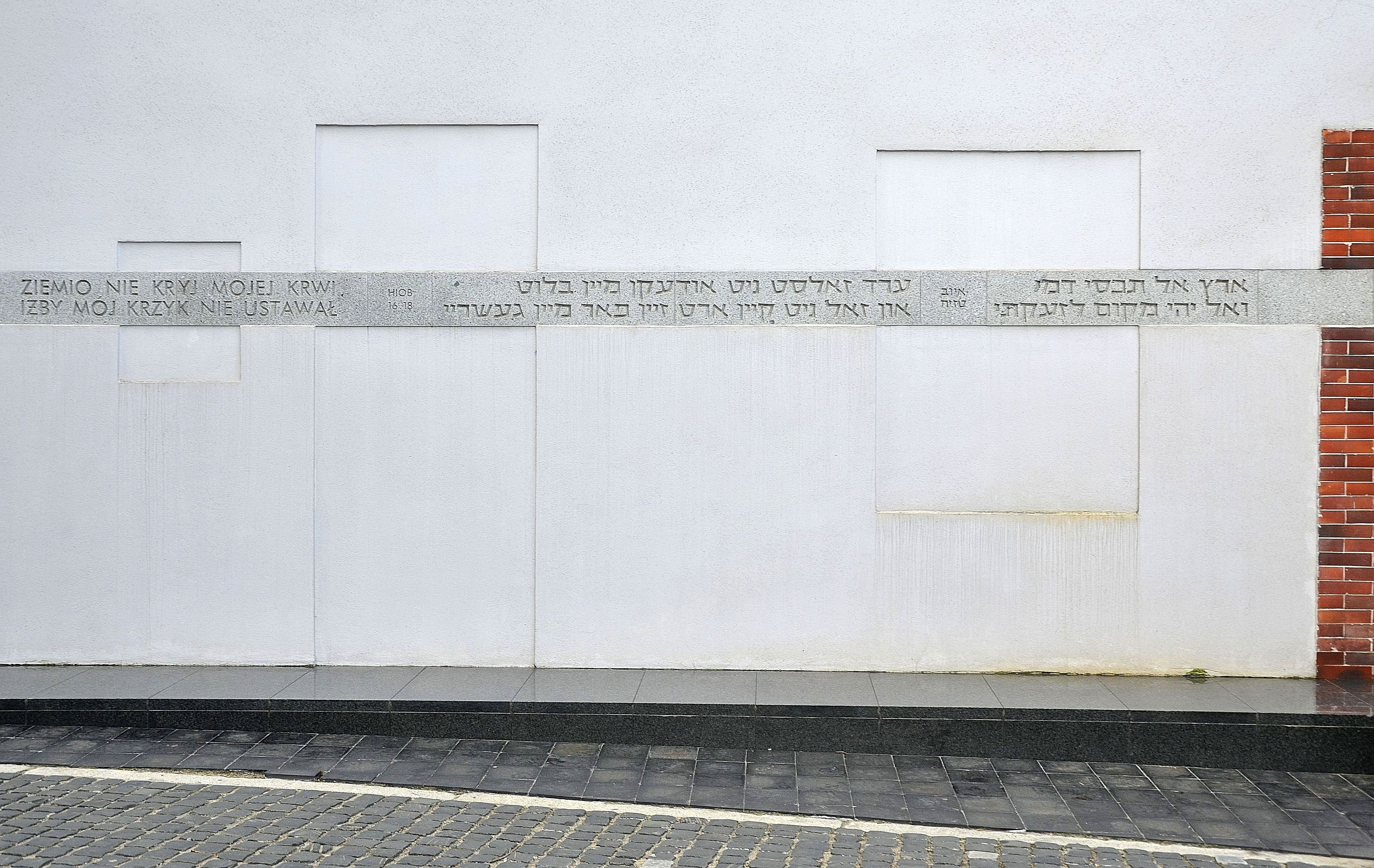
Quote from the Book of Job on the side wall of the building cutting through the contours of windows and doors

The present monument replaced the first post-war commemoration of this place with a sandstone plaque placed in 1948 on the side wall of one of the Umschlagplatz buildings (from the side of Stawki Street). It contained an inscription in Polish, Hebrew and Yiddish:

From this place, in 1942 and 1943, mass murdering Nazis transported hundreds of thousands of Jews to the death camps. Hail to the memory of Jewish martyrs and fighters.

== Surrounding area ==
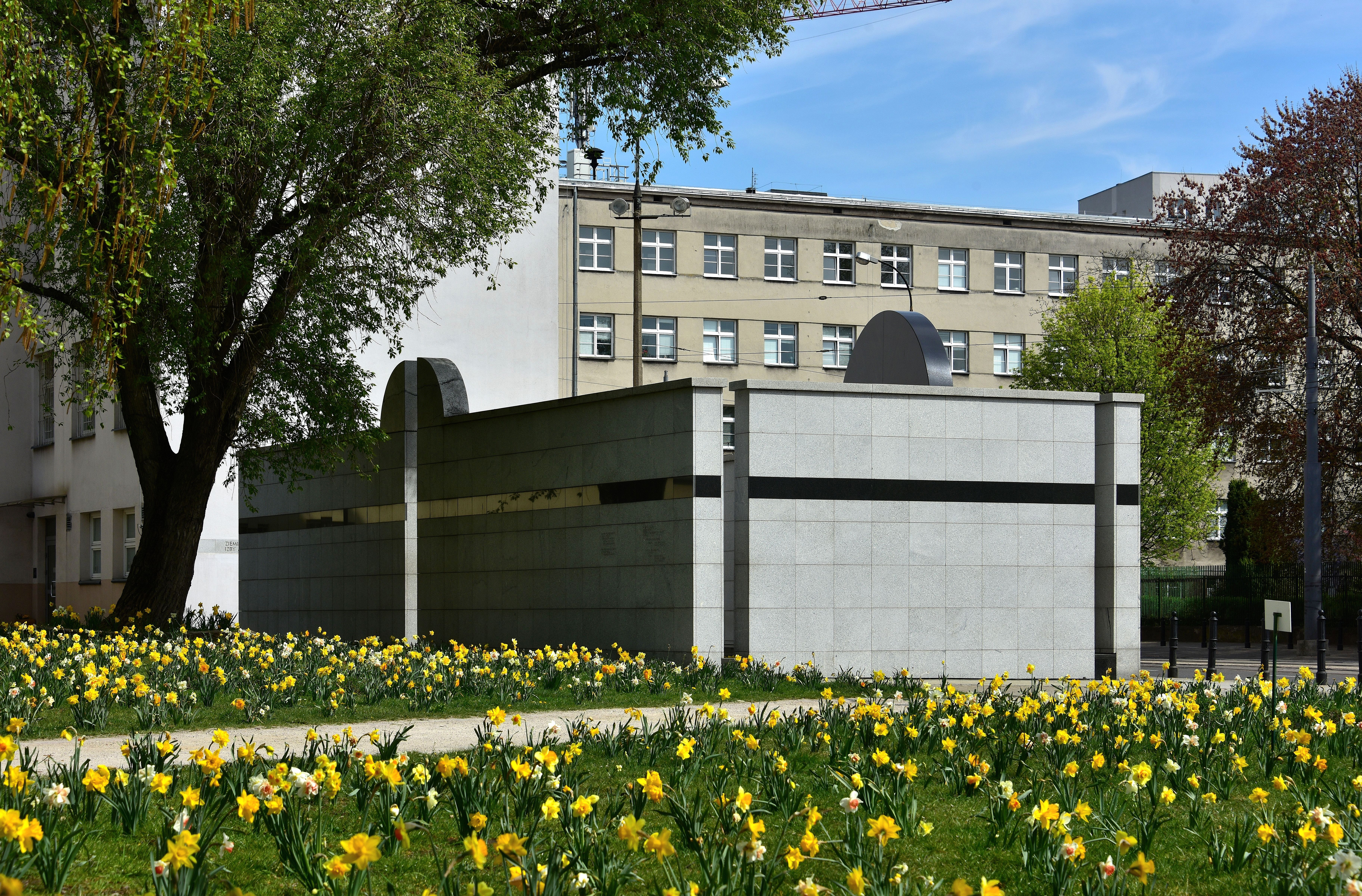
The monument viewed from Dzika Street

- Memorial Route of Jewish Martyrdom and Struggle: a stone block commemorating the creation of the ghetto in Warsaw by the Germans in 1940 (Stawki Street, corner of Dzika Street).
- The building of the Faculty of Psychology of the University of Warsaw (before the war no. 21, now no. 5/7)—the SS branch supervising Umschlagplatz was stationed in this building in 1942–1943.
- At the back of the Complex of High Schools and Economics No. 1 is a fragment of the ghetto wall which was the border of Umschlagplatz. In 2014, it was dismantled and reconstructed after the bricks were cleaned.

== See also ==
- List of Holocaust memorials and museums - Poland

== Bibliography ==
- Henryk Drzewiecki. Trakt Pamięci w Warszawie. „Res Publica”. 2/1990. p. 41–44.
- Wiesław Głębocki: Warszawskie pomniki. Wydawnictwo PTTK "Kraj", 1990, p. 108-109. ISBN 83-7005-211-8.
