= David Eisenstadt =

Polish Jewish choirmaster and composer (1890–1942)

- Born: 1890; Nasielsk, Poland
- Died: 1942 (aged 51–52); Treblinka
- Occupations: Conductor, composer, music educator

David Eisenstadt (Polish: Dawid Ajzensztadt, Yiddish: דוד אײַזנשטאַט; 1890 in Nasielsk – 1942 in Treblinka) was a Polish Jewish conductor, composer, music educator and music critic. He served as choirmaster of the Great Synagogue on Tłomackie Street in Warsaw for nearly twenty years (1921–1939) and was regarded as one of the most outstanding figures in choral art in pre-war Poland. He was the father of Maria Ajzensztadt, known as the "nightingale of the ghetto".

== Early life and education ==
Eisenstadt was born in Nasielsk, a town with centuries-old Jewish traditions. His father was a shochet (ritual slaughterer) who also occasionally served as a cantor. He moved to Nowy Dwór Mazowiecki to study music theory, singing and cantorial traditions under Eliezer Boruchowicz, then continued his vocal education in Berlin.

== Career before Warsaw ==
From 1909 Eisenstadt served as synagogue choir conductor in Gomel. Three years later he moved to Riga, then toured Belarus and Ukraine with a travelling theatre. In 1918 he settled in Rostov-on-Don as choirmaster of the city's Great Synagogue.

== The Great Synagogue Choir ==
In 1921 Eisenstadt settled permanently in Warsaw and became choirmaster of the Great Synagogue on Tłomackie Street, a position he held for nearly twenty years. His family lived at the back of the synagogue.

The choir comprised approximately 80 boys aged 9–13 singing soprano and alto, and about 20 adult men — tenors, baritones and basses. Beyond liturgical services, the choir gave numerous secular concerts and recorded for Polish Radio. In the synagogue, the choir was accompanied by a harmonium, though some sources also mention organs.

In 1935 the choir participated in the premiere of Lodovico Rocca's opera Il Dibuk (The Dybbuk). According to accounts, the composer attended a Sabbath service at the Great Synagogue upon arriving in Warsaw and, impressed by the singers, proposed their inclusion in the new work.

Eisenstadt's annual Jewish music concerts attracted Warsaw's entire musical establishment. Among the audience were Ignacy Jan Paderewski, Emil Młynarski and General Bolesław Wieniawa-Długoszowski. Over the years, these concerts were hailed as the greatest achievement in vocal art in Poland.

== Other activities ==
Eisenstadt also directed choirs for the Society for Promoting Jewish Education and Culture (Szul-Kult) and the Kultur-Lige. In 1936 he was appointed director of the cantorial school at the Warsaw Institute of Music. He co-founded the Jewish Music Society and co-authored (with Jakub Preger) the Algemajner muzik-leksikon, intended as a Jewish music encyclopaedia, of which only three issues appeared before the war.

== Compositions ==
Although it was widely believed that Eisenstadt's compositions had not survived, several works have been preserved and new ones continue to be discovered.

Some were collected and published by cantor Israel Alter of Johannesburg under the title L'Dovid Mizmor, including liturgical works Hajom haras olom, L'choh dodi, Shom'oh vatismah tsiyon, L'eineinu oshku amoleinu and Sh'chuloch achuloh.

His most celebrated work is the Passover cantata Chad Gadya (One Little Goat), based on the children's song sung during the seder. It consists of four movements: Allegro scherzando; Andantino based on Talmudic motifs; Largo depicting the struggle between the Angel of Death and the shochet; and a finale describing the triumph of righteousness over evil.

Other compositions include the cantata Iz awek cum krig der melech (And the King Went to War), set to a poem by Maria Konopnicka translated by Abraham Reisen; the orchestral Hebrew Suite; music for Halpern Leivick's drama Golem (premiered 1928); and choral songs in Yiddish.

== Warsaw Ghetto ==
After the German occupation, Eisenstadt considered fleeing to the Soviet Union but at his wife's urging remained in Warsaw. In the Warsaw Ghetto the family lived on Ceglana Street.

He continued his artistic activity under ghetto conditions. At the Femina Theatre on Leszno Street he founded a symphony orchestra, where his daughter Marysia's talent was fully revealed. As Emanuel Ringelblum noted: "Young, beautiful, dark-haired Marysia was the most popular person in all of Warsaw."

In May 1941, when German authorities permitted the opening of three synagogues in the ghetto, Eisenstadt served as choir conductor.

== Death ==
The family's final moments were described by Jonas Turkow: in August 1942, German soldiers separated Marysia from her parents at the Umschlagplatz and loaded David Eisenstadt and his wife into a freight car. Marysia ran back to her parents and was already at the wagon door when she was struck by a German bullet.

The transport from the Umschlagplatz went to Treblinka, where David and his wife Fajga (née Goldman) were murdered in the gas chamber.

== Rediscovery of the Chad Gadya manuscript ==
In the 1920s Eisenstadt sent the manuscript of the cantata to cantor Froim Spektor, who in 1928 emigrated to Cape Town to become chief cantor of the New Hebrew Congregation, taking the score with him.

In 2011 the manuscript was discovered in Cape Town by Dr Stephen Muir of the University of Leeds. The modern premiere of the cantata took place on 14 March 2014 at the Clothworkers Concert Hall at the University of Leeds.

== Modern recording ==
On 17 November 2024 the first phonographic recording of Eisenstadt's music was premiered at the POLIN Museum of the History of Polish Jews in Warsaw — a vinyl record titled Music of David Eisenstadt. It was performed by the vocal ensemble Match Match, tenor Wojciech Parchem, organist Jakub Stefek and conductor Lilianna Krych, produced by the SPOT.ON ART Foundation.

== Family ==
- Wife — Fajga Goldman (d. 1942, Treblinka)
- Daughter — Marysia (Maria, Miriam) Ajzensztadt (1921–1942), singer, "nightingale of the ghetto"

== See also ==
- Great Synagogue (Warsaw)
- Maria Ajzensztadt
- Gershon Sirota
