= St. Augustine's Church, Warsaw =

Church of St Augustine Kościół św. Augustyna w Warszawie (in Polish)
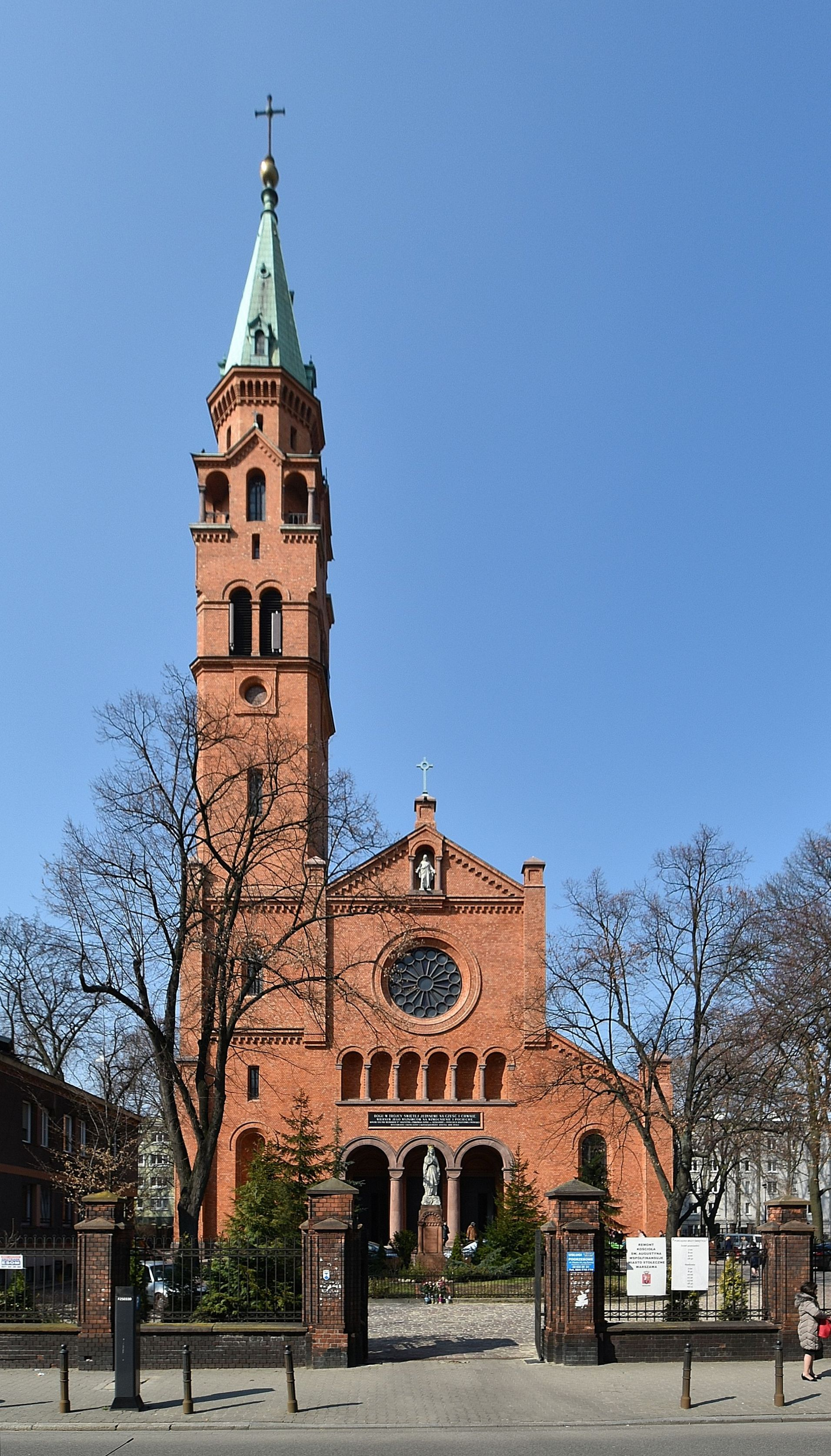
- The Church of St Augustine at night.
- Church of St Augustine; Kościół św. Augustyna w Warszawie (in Polish)
- 52.244444°N 20.988611°E
- Location: Warsaw
- Country: Poland
- Denomination: Roman Catholic
- Website: http://swaugustyn.pl/

Architecture
- Architect(s): Edward Cichocki; Józef Huss
- Style: Neo-Romanesque
- Groundbreaking: 1891
- Completed: 1896

Clergy
- Pastor: Monsignor Walenty Królak

The Church of St Augustine is a Roman Catholic church at 18 Nowolipki Street, in Wola, Warsaw, which was built in neo-Romanesque style.

== History of the Church ==
In 1896 the construction of a new church was made possible through the generosity of the already venerable Countess Aleksandra Potocka, widow of Count August Potocki (1806-1867), who had decided to commemorate the death, 25 years past, of her late husband by supporting the building of this church. The Countess had allocated, for the times, the huge sum of 300,000 rubles. It purchased two adjacent plots of land so the building could stand facing Nowolipki street. Ludwik Górski was the head of the church building committee, along with Aleksandra Potocka and Count Franciszek Czacki, among others.

The designers of the church were Edward Cichocki and Józef Huss. Construction started in 1891. The cornerstone was dedicated on October 20, 1892 by the Warsaw Archbishop Wincenty Teofil Popiel-Chościak accompanied by the auxiliary bishop of Warsaw, Kazimierz Ruszkiewicz.

On 10 December 1896, the first Mass was celebrated in the new church by Archbishop Popiel-Chościak and Father Canon Ignacy Durewicz who dedicated the church. At that time, they were still working at equipping the interior. The church was consecrated by Bishop Ruszkiewicz in 1905.

After the German creation of the Warsaw Ghetto, the church was within its bounds, effectively closing it. Despite the official closure of the church, the home parish priest, Father Franciszek Garncarek and vicar Leon Więckowicz (or Więckiewicz) continued to live there. They took part in smuggling Jews, with a focus on Jewish converts to Catholicism, out of the ghetto. Father Garncarek was shot on the steps of a church outside the ghetto on 20 December 1943. Więckowicz was arrested on 3 December 1942 and deported to the Gross-Rosen concentration camp, where he died on 4 August 1944. One source claims that Więckowicz was deported for aiding Jews, another for openly supporting some Christian Poles condemned to death.

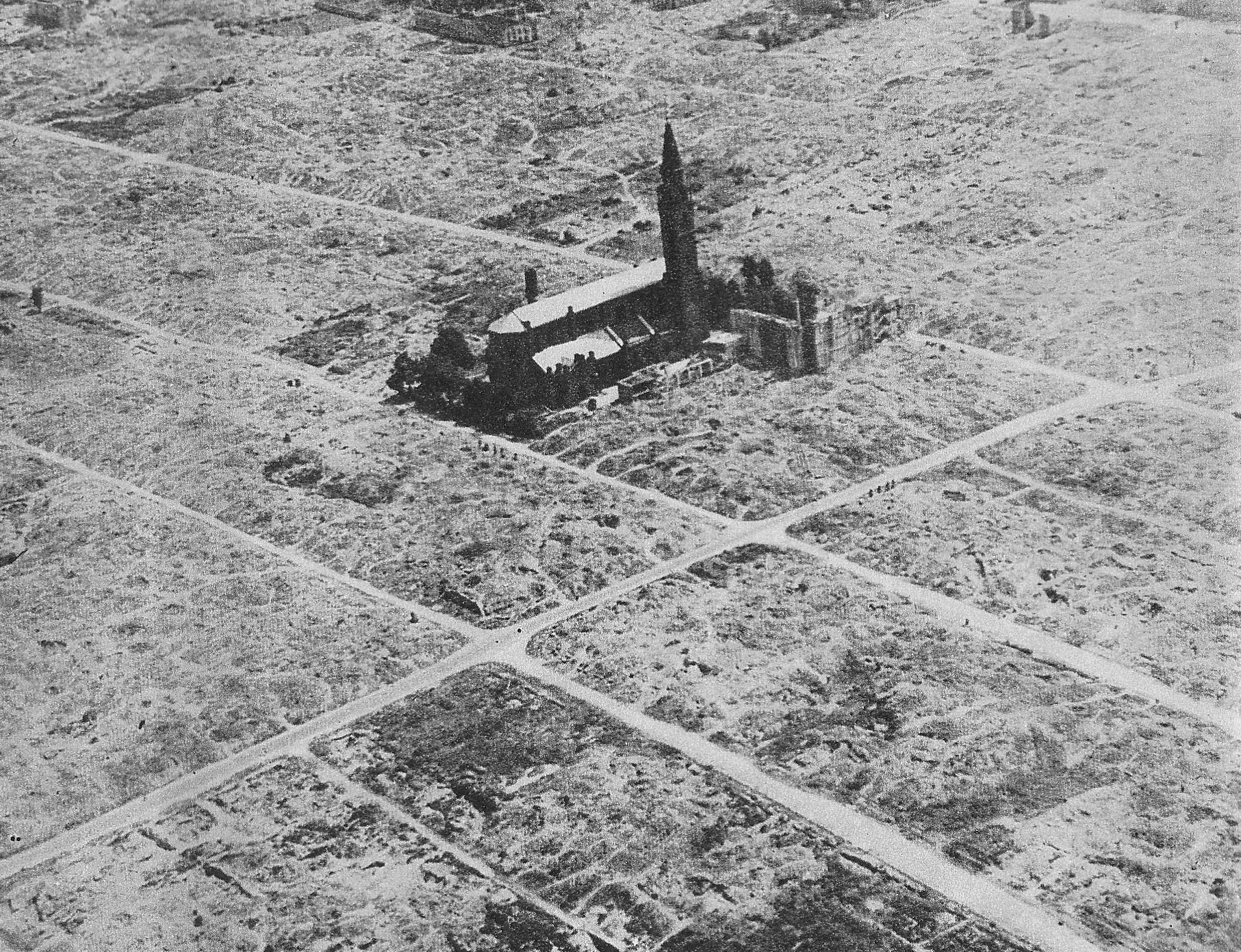
1945-1947 view of Warsaw Ghetto ruins after the war and St Augustine Church

With the liquidation of the ghetto, the church was used as a warehouse in which property stolen from Jews was stored, then the church was converted into a stable. During the Warsaw Uprising the church tower was a vantage point and German machine gun nest. On 5 August 1944 the tower was damaged during the assault on the nearby Gesiowka Prison by soldiers of Battalion Zośka. After the uprising, Germans set fire to the roof of the church and a considerable amount of the church was burned. The fire also took the rectory and parish house. The Germans had a plan to blow up the church, but it was not realized.

After the war, it was the highest and one of the few remaining buildings in the former ghetto. By 1947, with funds for the purpose of restoration by the Council of Churches of Warsaw Reconstruction, a facility was opened to the faithful, while renovations were still taking place. In 1953, vaults were plastered over the aisles and the bell restored.

The church yard area was reduced because of emerging housing estates.

== The architecture of the church ==
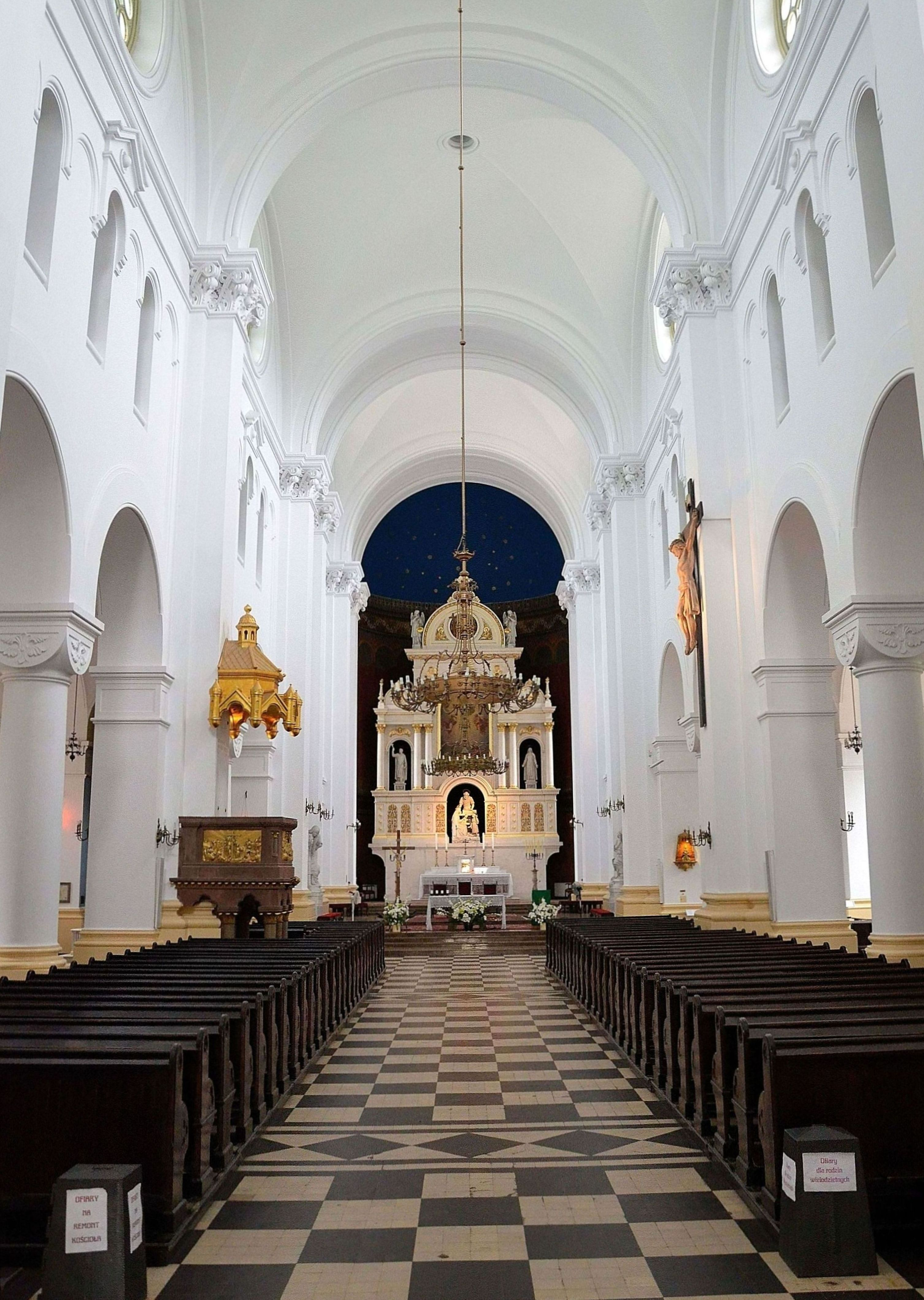
The interior of the church.

The church was built of red clinker brick with stone architectural details in brown-red and beige. There are three naves, in a basilica enriched with a high turret in the north-east corner. An elongated, closed choir is in the north-west. Flanking it are a couple of annexes with narrow antechambers: the north vestry and the south chapel. The two-storey facade is flanked to the left by a tower, and on the right by a chapel annex. Above the portico, resting on three arcades, is a strip of six semi-circular niches.

The upper storey of the facade is filled with a large rosette. The facade is crowned by a triangular pediment. The nave and chancel are covered by a common roof gable. The interior is closed vaulting. The nave is lit by a pair of rosettes in each bay. Below them are a group of three windows opening to a space under pitched roofs.

The interior has an applied alternating support system with the spans of the nave separated by pillars. Shank pilasters, extended walls of the nave are crowned with Corinthian capitals below the cornice. Between the pillars are placed pairs of arches supported on Romanesque columns. Dicing capitals are decorated with plant compositions. A choir is placed above the porch in a bay facade. It supports three Romanesque arches separated by a pair of semi-columns. The chancel has three bays, and is covered with a barrel vault. On the north side is the apse. Under the church is a vaulted basement.

The neo-Romanesque church tower, at the time of building the highest in Warsaw (70 m), is topped with a cross 5.1 m tall located on a sphere with a diameter of 1.35 m. In 1959, this sphere, originally gilded, was painted black by the command of the authorities at the time. It was a reliable way of stopping the widespread rumors of a miraculous appearance on the ball of the Virgin Mary which caused a gathering of the faithful at the church.

In 1995 the paint was removed from the sphere, restoring it to its former appearance.

On the north wall of the church is a cross placed to celebrate entering the third millennium. On August 28, 2002 there was a dedication to the victims of the Pawiak prison by Father Monsignor Wiesław Kądziela.

== The Parish ==
The parish has many communities and groups, including groups associated with the liturgy, the Legion of Mary, Rosary Wheels, a Neocatechumenal Way group, and an AA group. In the church basement a "Tea Room" hosts various cultural events, concerts, lectures and multimedia presentations. A film club is also held there.

In 2006, the church also repaired the roof of the tower, damaged during World War II, bought an organ and the parish regained ownership of an adjacent square, which it had lost after the war. On 22 October 2006, the church was ceremonially lit. At the ceremony were Polish Primate Józef Glemp and former Prime Minister Kazimierz Marcinkiewicz.

In 2009, the main tower of the church was renovated.

=== List of head parish priests ===
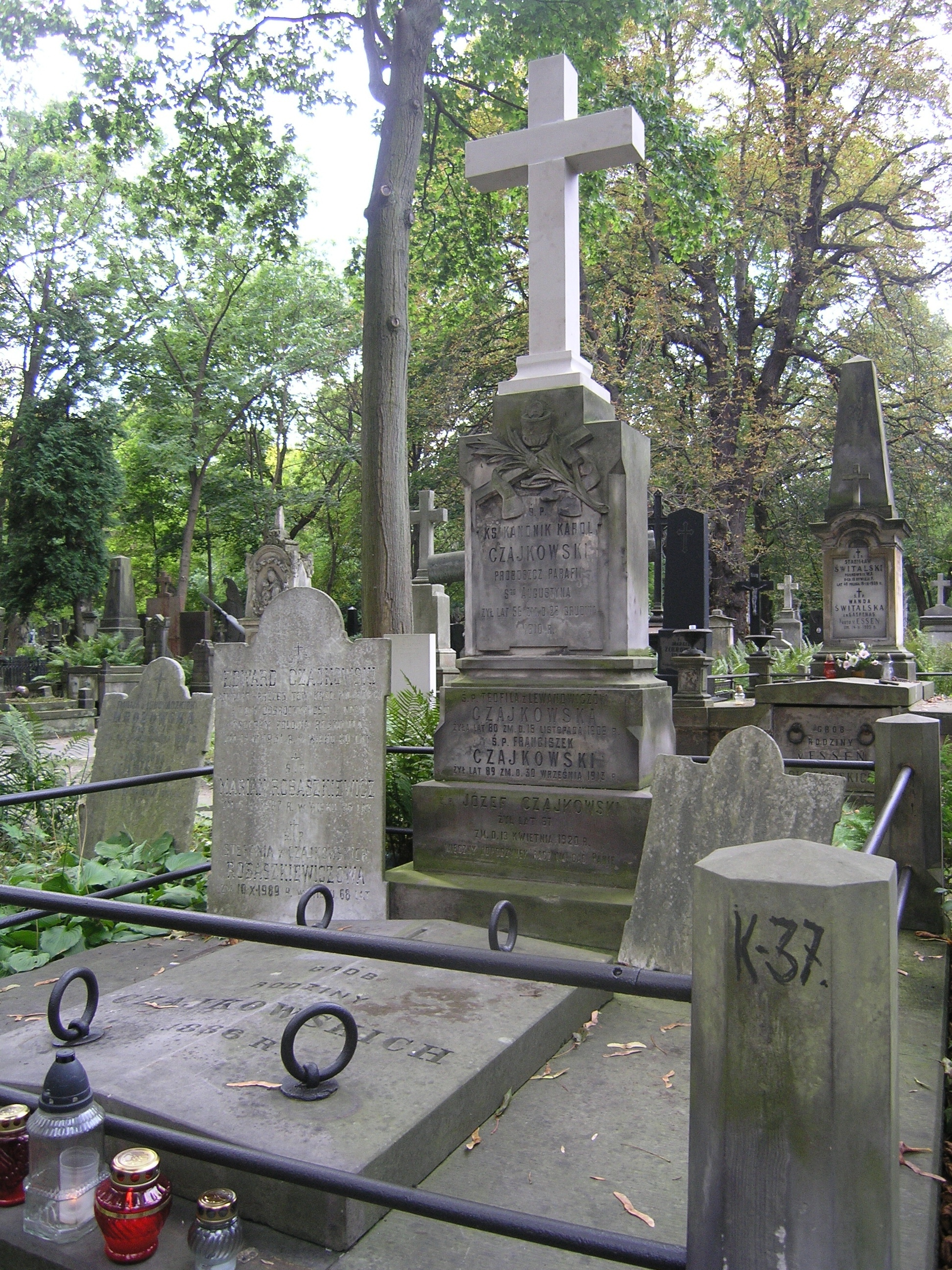
The tomb of the first parish priest Fr. Canon Karol Czajkowski at Powązki Cemetery

- Fr. Karol Czajkowski (1896–1910)
- Fr. Michał Siewruk (1911–1917)
- Fr. Wladyslaw Załuskowski (1917-1919)
- Fr. Julian Roczkowski (1919–1929)
- Fr. Karol Niemira (1929–1933)
- Fr. Franciszek Garncarek (1934–1942)
- Fr. Marian Wasilewski (1942–1949)
- Fr. Józef Netczuk (1949–1952)
- Fr. Stefan Kuć (1952–1966)
- Fr. Mieczyslaw Jablonka (1966–1986)
- Fr. Stefan Księżopolski (1986–1992)
- Fr. Walenty Królak (1992 - currently in office)

=== Present parish priests ===
- Fr. Walenty Królak (pastor, spiritual father of the deanery of Wola)
- Fr. Carlos Cezar Damaglio (vicar)
- Fr. Gienadij Kozłow (vicar)
- Ks. Moisés Marín Pérez (vicar)
- Ks. Sebastian Wawrzyński (vicar)

=== Priests associated with the parish ===
- Fr. Pedro Jose Guzman Ardila (former vicar, now prefect of the Archdiocesan Missionary Seminary "Redemptoris Mater")
- Fr. Artur Awdalian (former vicar at the same time acting as the central parish priest of the Eastern Rite faithful who do not have their own Ordinary. Later vicar of the parish of St. Teresa of the Child Jesus in Warsaw in the Ursus deanery and currently directed to recuperate from a stay in the seminary "Redemptoris Mater" Warsaw)
- Fr. Jaroslaw Kotula (former vicar, now vicar of the Church of the Holiest Saviour in Warsaw)
- Fr. Andrzej Kucharczyk (former vicar, now vicar of the Parish of St. Stephen in the Wilanów deanery in Warsaw)
- Fr. Jan Józef Lorenz (former vicar, now directed to the ministry as a missionary priest "Fidei Donum")
- Fr. Zbigniew Porzeziński (former vicar, now vicar of the parish of Holy Trinity in Warsaw in the Świętokrzyskie deanery)
- Fr. Robert Sawa (former vicar, now pastor of Notre Dame de la Paix in Avignon, France)
- Fr. Ivica Susnjar (former vicar, now parish priest of St. Vincentego Paul - Nkolndobo and St. Peter - Nyom II in Yaoundé, Cameroon)

== Bibliography ==
- Official site of the church
- Kronika Parafialna Kościoła św. Augustyna w Warszawie (Chronicle of the Parish Church of St. Augustine in Warsaw)
- ”100 lat kościoła św. Augustyna” (100 years of the St Augustine Church, Drukarnia WN Alfa-Wero Sp. z o.o., Warszawa, 1997 r., ISBN 83-902006-7-8)
- Information on the parish Archdiocese of Warsaw
