= Cecylia Słapakowa =

Polish journalist (1900–1942)

- Born: c. 1900; Vilnius/Wilna, Lithuania, Russian Empire
- Died: 1942 or 1943; Treblinka extermination camp or Trawniki "training and labour camp", Germany
- Occupations: Journalist; Translator
- Known for: her "Oyneg Shabbos" interviews with women in the Warsaw Ghetto
- Children: 1

Cecylia Słapakowa (c. 1900–c. 1942) was a Polish-Jewish journalist and translator. She is most known for her work for the Ringelblum Archive, then code-named the "Oyneg Shabbos" project, established by Emanuel Ringelblum.

Her life was dramatically impacted by the invasion of Poland in September 1939, but for approximately six months she was able to continue living in her Warsaw home and to welcome visitors. In early 1940 she was forced to leave her apartment. She ended up living in the Warsaw Ghetto where she chronicled the lives of Jewish women living in the ghetto for the "Oyneg Shabbos" project. She was killed at a concentration camp in either 1942 or 1943.

== Early life and background ==
Cecylia Słapakowa and her family came from Lithuania which at the time of her birth was a socially and intellectually semi-detached frontier province of the Russian Empire. She had been born in the Vilnius/Wilna region. At some point she relocated to Warsaw in Poland, which before 1915 was administered as another semi-detached province of the Russian Empire. Despite her Lithuanian provenance she was fluent in both Yiddish and Russian. She was, according to one source, a member of the "old Russian-speaking Jewish intelligensia", which had been dispersed during the turbulent aftermath of the October Revolution in Leningrad. At home her daily language was Russian, but it is clear from what is known of her work that she had mastered a number of different languages. Despite being identified in Warsaw as "Lithuanian", she defied contemporary stereotypes by building and sustaining contacts with Polish and Yiddish cultures.

== Pre-war career ==
During the 1930s Słapakowa worked as a journalist and translator. Her articles and reviews appeared regularly in Nasz Przegląd, a daily newspaper published in Warsaw for the large Polish-Jewish community, presenting what one source defines as a "moderately zionist viewpoint" ("...umiarkowanie syjonistyczny punkt..."). She also undertook work for the Warsaw branch of the Yiddish Research Institute (YIVO / Żydowski Instytut Naukowy). The largest translation project on which she is known to have worked involved teaming up with Zofią Erlichową. Together the women translated Simon Dubnow's twelve volume "Historia Żydów" ("History of the Jews") from Russian into Polish. The Polish edition was first published at Kraków in 1939. A posthumously published second edition appeared in 1948.

Little is known of Słapakowa's family situation. It is believed that she was married to a successful engineer and that the couple had a daughter. They lived comfortably in a large first floor apartment along the Ulica Elektoralna, a long street running not quite east–west across Warsaw's Śródmieście and Wola districts, near the city centre on its western side. Słapakowa was closely networked with fellow members of the Yiddish intellectual elite. Among the better known members of her circle were the eminent historian-critic Shmuel Niger and his younger brother, the poet Daniel Charney. Others in their group included Marc and Bella Chagall.

== World War II experiences ==
Following the invasion of Poland in September 1939, Warsaw was under German military occupation. Słapakowa continued to welcome Jewish artists and intellectuals to the apartment, and did so with great determination, partly in order to try and stave off depression and set aside fear of the future. A basic meal and a few hours of good conversation among fifteen or so guests made it possible, temporarily, to forget about the war. Sometimes there was even the chance for music making among the guests. One frequent guest was the journalist Rachel Auerbach who as late as April 1940 was able to observe that the Słapak home was still a pleasant place, "despite the many articles of furniture that the Germans had confiscated".

In late April or early May 1940 the Słapaks had to leave their home. Of Słapakowa's final years, little information survived, though it appears she was able to keep her school-age daughter with her in what became remembered by future generations as the Warsaw Ghetto, which is where she ended up.

== Ringelblum Archive work ==
It was probably during early 1941 that Cecylia Słapakowa began to work for the Ringelblum Archive project, then code-named the "Oyneg Shabbos", established by Emanuel Ringelblum to create a chronicle of lives of Jews incarcerated in the Warsaw Ghetto during the German occupation. A comprehensive study covering the first two and a half years of the German occupation was planned, covering cities under both German and Soviet occupation. After February 1942, when group members first learned of the existence of the death camps, it became clear that the project could never be completed as initially envisaged. There was never any formal list of contributors, and as events unfolded surviving contributors introduced a number of smaller studies outside the originally envisaged project scope. Only part of the archive survived the destructive impact of the war, so the full extent of Słapakowa's contribution is impossible to know.

From what survives, it is known that between December 1941 and May 1942 (possibly later), Słapakowa undertook a study of the lives of Jewish women living in the ghetto during the period. She undertook sixteen in-depth interviews from Jewish women selected in order to represent different social strata She asked them about their lives before the war, and about all the changes they had experienced under the German occupation. As conditions had deteriorated she asked them about their struggles for survival and experiences of war during a period of intensifying familial impoverishment, hunger, disease and danger. She completed sixteen short biographies that have survived, each with their subjects identified simply by the initials of the interviewees. One of her hopes for the project was that, after the war was over, her contribution might help change the stereotypical perceptions of women's roles within Jewish society. The surviving biographies, written in Polish, are held as part of the Ringelblum Archive at the Jewish Historical Institute in central Warsaw.

It is likely that Słapakowa handed over the notebook containing transcriptions of her interviews and other research work to Eliahu Gutkowski or Hersz Wasser, two of the "Oyneg Shabbos" project organisers, shortly before the start of the so-called "Great Action", the mass-deportation of Polish Jews undertaken by the German military administrators. Mass-deportations began in the second half of July 1942.

== Death and legacy ==
Like many others working on the project, Cecylia Słapakowa was taken by train to the Treblinka extermination camp where, according to information later provided by the project organiser Ringelblum, she and her daughter were killed soon after arrival. There is a certain amount of unclarity as to whether she was murdered at Treblinka in 1942 or at the Trawniki concentration camp in 1943, but it is as certain as it can be that she was a Holocaust (or shoah) victim. According to her friend, the young journalist Rachel Auerbach, her husband survived the shoah, however. The nature and extent (possibly only partially) of her work for the "Oyneg Shabbos" project became apparent only after the war was concluded and the large tin boxes in which Part I of the project had been hastily hidden were retrieved and opened up.

The surviving interview transcripts were published in Volume 5 of the Ringelblum Archive, most recently in 2012, edited by Katarzyna Person.

== Basia Temkin-Berman ==
At least one of Słapakowa's sixteen interviewees is known to have survived the Holocaust, Barbara "Basia" Temkin (1907–1953). Before 1939 she was one of very few Jews to be employed at the Warsaw Public Library. This meant that she had many friends in Warsaw who were not Jewish, and who would be able to help her after the Germans invaded. As a ghetto inmate, she overcame a succession of difficulties to set up a children's library which, she told Słapakowa during an interview, was far more satisfying than her pre-war work in the city library, because in the library in the Warsaw Ghetto she repeatedly had an instant sense of achievement from the belief that she was helping Jewish children prepare for life after the war. At some point, probably early in 1943, she managed to escape the ghetto after which she and her husband, the future politician Adolf Berman, lived as non-Jews in the "Aryan" part of the city, actively working with members of the Polish resistance to help fellow Jews escape the ghetto, until this activity was abruptly halted in 1944 by the arrival of the Soviet army. Adolf and Besia Temkin-Berman emigrated to Israel in 1950 where Besia died, still aged only 45, in 1953. Through the posthumous publication, in 2000, of her wartime diaries, Basia Temkin-Berman's contributions to Polish resistance have become accessible in her own words.
