= Central Arrest in the Warsaw Ghetto =

Detention center in the Warsaw Ghetto

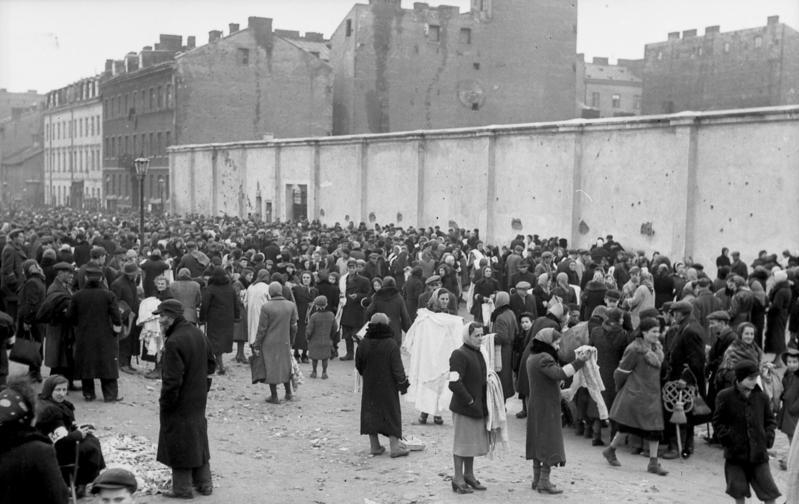
Warsaw Ghetto, market at the intersection of Ksawery Lubecki and Gęsia streets. On the right, the wall of the Central Arrest is visible. Photo taken in June 1941

The Central Arrest in the Warsaw Ghetto, officially the Central Arrest for the Jewish Residential District (German: Zentralarrest für den jüdischen Wohnbezirk), commonly referred to as Gęsiówka, was a prison facility in the Warsaw Ghetto during World War II. It operated from 1941 to 1942.

The detention center was located on the site of a pre-war Polish military prison at Gęsia Street. It was formally subordinate to the Polish Police of the General Government ("Blue Police"), while its staff consisted of members of the Jewish Ghetto Police. The facility detained Jews accused of offences against German occupation regulations. In spring 1942, approximately 190 Roma and Sinti individuals were also held there. The prisoner population grew steadily, reaching around 1,800 by July 1942.

Living and sanitary conditions were extremely poor, leading to high mortality. Executions took place on the premises, including two recorded in November and December 1941 involving Jews caught on the "Aryan side" without permits. Other prisoners were executed at separate locations. During Grossaktion Warsaw in summer 1942, the inmates of the Central Arrest were among the first groups deported to the Treblinka extermination camp.

== Establishment ==
At the turn of 1940 and 1941, the German Sondergericht in Warsaw (German: Sondergericht Warschau) significantly intensified penalties for Jews accused of violations of occupation regulations. Convictions increasingly resulted in terms of imprisonment without the option of release pending trial, leading to a sharp rise in the number of Jewish detainees held in Warsaw facilities, including Pawiak prison, the investigative detention center at Daniłowiczowska Street, and Mokotów Prison.

Jewish prisoners faced severe hardship. A prohibition on external assistance prevented support from families or Jewish aid organizations, limiting help to occasional aid from the Patronage for the Care of Prisoners. Many inmates succumbed to starvation, disease, and mistreatment by guards. German authorities cited these conditions as posing an epidemiological risk to non-Jewish prisoners. Additionally, instances were recorded of ill Jewish inmates escaping during temporary transfers from "Aryan side" prisons to Warsaw Ghetto hospitals. These factors contributed to the decision to create a dedicated detention facility for Jewish prisoners within the ghetto. Historian Jan Grabowski has also suggested that the broader German policy of "Aryanizing" prisons in the Warsaw District played a role in this development.

The earliest known references to the planned facility appear in the diary of Adam Czerniaków, chairman of the Judenrat. On 6 June 1941, he recorded a discussion with Major Franciszek Przymusiński of the Polish Police of the General Government, who emphasized the need for a separate "Jewish arrest" in the ghetto due to typhus infections among "blue police" officers. Three days later, Czerniaków noted: "The Jewish arrest has been launched. The director is Lewkowicz". (Note: Tomasz Szarota dates the establishment of the Central Arrest significantly earlier, namely to 15 November 1940 (Komorowski (2014, p. 251)).) Official announcement of the new detention facility appeared in mid-July 1941 in the German-licensed Gazeta Żydowska, published in Kraków.

Initially, occupation authorities debated whether the facility should function as a prison or a pre-trial detention center. It was ultimately designated the Central Arrest for the Jewish Residential District (German: Zentralarrest für den jüdischen Wohnbezirk). Following its establishment, Jewish prisoners previously held in other Warsaw detention sites were transferred there. Nonetheless, Jews apprehended on the "Aryan side" continued occasionally to be detained outside the ghetto.

== Location ==
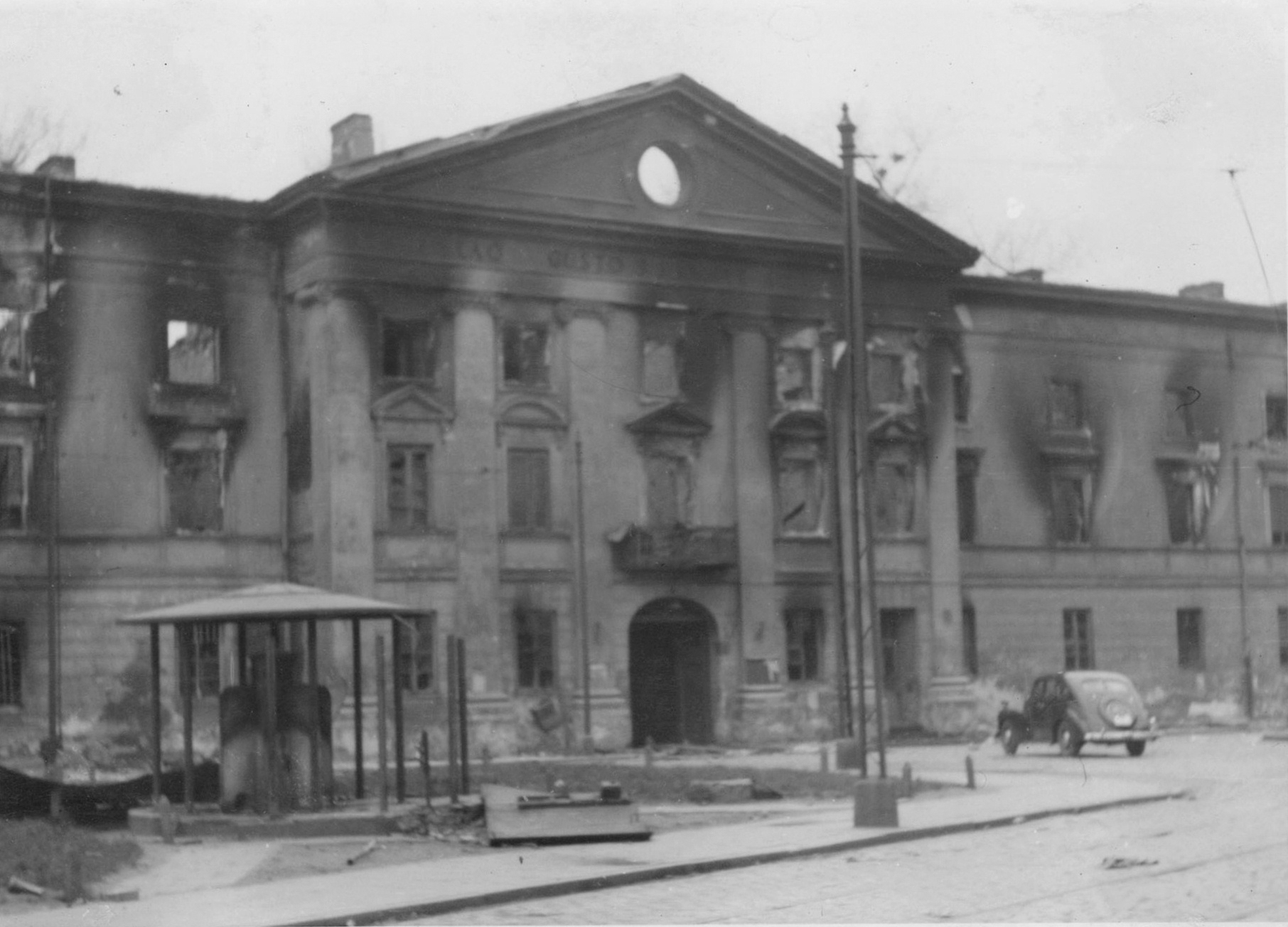
Front building of the Volhynia Barracks, burned during the Warsaw Ghetto Uprising

The Central Arrest was initially established in the building at 22 Gęsia Street. Entries in the diary of Adam Czerniaków indicate that the facility was originally designed to accommodate approximately 100 to 150 inmates. However, the rapid increase in the number of detainees soon exceeded the building's capacity. To address this overcrowding, 10 large cells in the adjacent structure at 24 Gęsia Street – part of the pre-war Volhynia Barracks complex – were repurposed for detention purposes. This complex had formerly housed Military Investigative Prison No. I, known colloquially as "Gęsiówka". The front building of the complex, situated at 19 Ludwik Zamenhof Street, saw only limited use by the Central Arrest; it primarily served as the location for the ghetto's Postal Parcel Receiving Office, the headquarters of the Fifth District of the Jewish Ghetto Police, and private apartments. (Note: In August 1942, during Grossaktion Warsaw, the headquarters of the Judenrat were also transferred there (Engelking & Leociak (2013, p. 399)).) The majority of detention cells were installed in the side wing of the barracks.

Despite the transfer of a substantial portion of inmates to the expanded facilities in the former barracks, the original building at 22 Gęsia Street remained in use as a detention site. It subsequently became referred to as the "small arrest".

== Organizational subordination and staff ==
The Central Arrest was formally subordinate to the Blue Police, with effective oversight maintained by that authority. Inspections of the facility were conducted regularly by both Polish police functionaries and representatives of the German occupation authorities.

Guard duties were carried out by members of the Jewish Ghetto Police. The prison staff formed a distinct unit within the Jewish Ghetto Police, reporting directly to its commander, Józef Szeryński. The director of the Central Arrest was Leopold Lindenfeld, a pre-war judge. (Note: Leopold Lindenfeld is indicated as director of the arrest by an anonymous ghetto chronicler who devoted one of the chapters of his account, preserved in the archive of the Jewish Historical Institute, to the Central Arrest. This is also confirmed by some official documents. As Hoffman (1989, p. 66) notes, however, this information conflicts with the mention in Adam Czerniaków's diary of the appointment of Lewkowicz as director of the arrest (Person (2018, p. 116)).) His initial deputy for economic affairs was a Judenrat official named Lewkowicz, who was replaced after several weeks by Ignacy Blaupapier, a member of the Jewish Ghetto Police command staff. Blaupapier was later succeeded, after several months, by Jewish Ghetto Police sub-district commander Izaak Rudniański. The administrative office was managed by Fryderyk Rose, a former captain in the Polish Armed Forces. Lower hierarchy included group leaders – comprising the commandant of the male guard section and the head of the female ward – followed by section leaders and orderlies. Auxiliary roles, such as medical and kitchen personnel, were also filled by staff members. Personnel assigned to the Central Arrest wore distinctive badges featuring the letter "A" with a number at the center.

In August 1941, female guards were incorporated into the staff. Although they were not formally members of the Jewish Ghetto Police, they were subject to the same uniform, organizational, and disciplinary regulations as that service. The position of head of the female ward was held by Sylwia Hurwicz, a pre-war lawyer from Łódź.

Leopold Lindenfeld was generally well-regarded within the ghetto. However, corruption was reportedly widespread among subordinate personnel. Inmates with sufficient financial means could often secure favors through bribes, including the facilitation of family parcels, assignment to less overcrowded or more comfortable cells, temporary release passes, or early discharge. Ignacy Blaupapier, in particular, was noted for corruption and was alleged to have shared bribe proceeds with German officials.

== Conditions in the arrest ==
The Central Arrest primarily held individuals accused of smuggling or remaining on the "Aryan side" without authorization. Detention there was also imposed for lesser infractions, such as traveling on trams without a valid ticket or failing to observe air-raid precautions. By late May 1942, nearly one-third of the inmates were minors under the age of 15.

Conditions in the facility were harsh from the very beginning. Historian Jan Grabowski has described them as even more severe than those in prisons on the "Aryan side". Although the two buildings combined had a normal capacity of approximately 350 people, overcrowding was extreme: on 10 March 1942, the prison held 1,283 inmates. By 9 April 1942, the population had risen to 1,436, comprising 751 men and 685 women. The number increased further to about 1,600 in May and reached approximately 1,800 by July 1942.

Relatively tolerable conditions existed in the "small arrest" (at 22 Gęsia Street) and in the southern cells of the main Gęsiówka complex. These areas housed more prominent or affluent prisoners, including wealthy smugglers, currency dealers, ghetto businessmen, and members of the intelligentsia. In contrast, the northern cells – referred to as the "proletarian" section – were severely overcrowded, accommodating 90–120 people per cell despite a pre-war capacity of only 10–20. Inmates in these areas could often maintain only a standing position due to lack of space. Ventilation was inadequate, leading to frequent incidents of fainting from oxygen deprivation. Conditions were particularly dire in the designated "death cell", reserved for seriously ill and dying prisoners.

The official daily bread ration was limited to 130 grams (compared to 400 grams in "Aryan side" prisons). Inmates also received two portions of soup per day and grain coffee. Bathing and disinfection occurred at irregular intervals. Overcrowding and poor sanitation facilitated the spread of infectious diseases, particularly typhus and tuberculosis. Physical abuse of prisoners by guards was commonplace.

Mortality rates in the Central Arrest were very high due to the severe conditions. An anonymous chronicler of the ghetto observed that, despite assistance efforts by the Patronage for the Care of Prisoners, inmates were "dying like flies". On 22 March 1942, Adam Czerniaków noted in his diary that an average of two prisoners perished daily at the facility. The high number of deaths created significant sanitary and administrative challenges, as corpses could not be removed until the death was formally verified and approved by the German Special Court. Only after some delay did German authorities allow death notifications to be communicated by telephone, and the court prosecutor subsequently permitted burials of deceased inmates.

The Central Arrest did not exclusively hold Jewish prisoners. In April and June 1942, approximately 190 Roma and Sinti people, arrested outside Warsaw on charges of "vagrancy" and temporarily resettled in the ghetto, were detained there. As outsiders unfamiliar with the city, they were particularly vulnerable, receiving no family parcels and little protection from guards. On 16 June 1942, German authorities authorized their release, after which they were transferred to Judenrat-maintained refugee shelters (known as "points"). Czerniaków's diary also mentions occasional detention of "Polish beggars", though this is not corroborated by other sources.

Adam Czerniaków made repeated interventions to improve conditions in the Central Arrest. Through his negotiations, larger groups of prisoners were released on several occasions, including 151 in March 1942 and 260 the following month. The Judenrat secured German permission for the observance of Jewish religious holidays within the facility and pursued initiatives to introduce vocational training for inmates. During Passover in spring 1942, the prison administration organized Passover Seder dinners for detainees. Czerniaków paid particular attention to the plight of juvenile prisoners. After prolonged negotiations, he obtained German approval in July 1942 for the establishment of a ghetto institution that would function as both a shelter and a reformatory, intended to house young Jews apprehended on the "Aryan side". These plans, however, were never implemented, as Grossaktion Warsaw commenced that same month.

At least three escape attempts from the Central Arrest were recorded during its period of operation.

== Executions and deportations ==
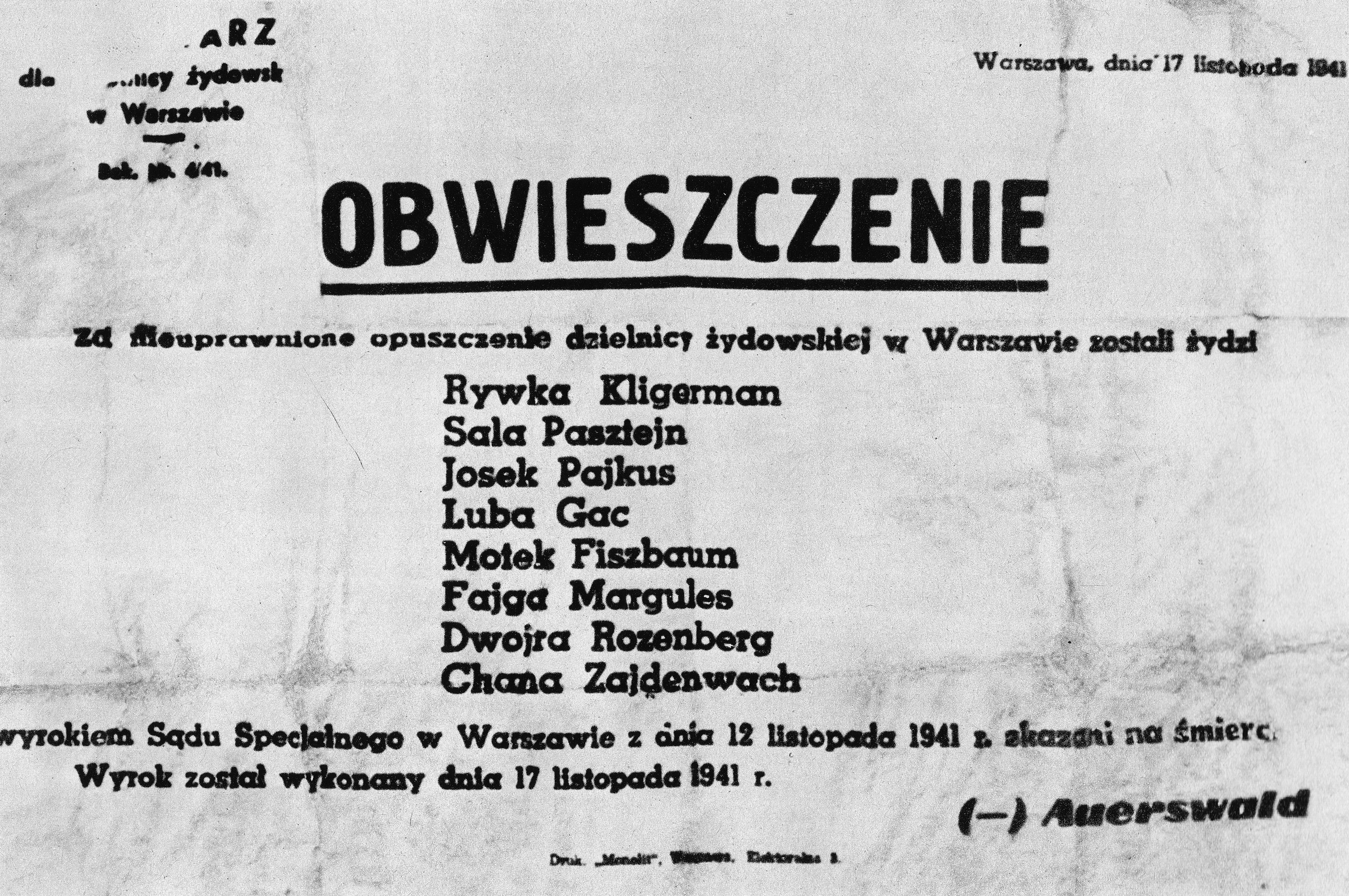
Announcement by ghetto commissioner Heinz Auerswald dated 17 November 1941, informing about the execution of eight Jews for "unauthorized departure from the Jewish district"

At the end of 1941, German occupation authorities intensified restrictions on the Jewish population in Warsaw. On 6 November 1941, Heinz Auerswald, the commissioner for the Jewish district, issued a public appeal announcing the death penalty for unauthorized crossings of the ghetto boundary. Four days later, on 10 November, Ludwig Fischer, the governor of the Warsaw District, signed an order stipulating capital punishment for Jews who left ghettos without permission, as well as for non-Jews who provided them shelter or assistance.

The initial executions under these decrees occurred on the grounds of the Central Arrest. On 17 November 1941, despite interventions by the Judenrat and clemency pleas from the families of the condemned, eight Jews – including six women – were shot in the prison yard. (Note: The victims were: Motek Fiszbaum, Luba Gac, Rywka Kligerman, Fajga Margules, Josek Pajkus, Sala Pasztejn, Dwojra Rozenberg and Chana Zajdenwach (Person (2018, p. 122)).) The firing squad comprised members of the Blue Police, (Note: 32 functionaries took part in the execution. Corporal Wiktor Zelek, who was the only one to volunteer, was condemned in the pages of the underground press (Person (2018, p. 124)).) with the execution overseen by the German prosecutor of the Sondergericht and Józef Szeryński, commander of the Jewish Ghetto Police. (Note: The participation of commissioner Heinz Auerswald was also planned, but he arrived late for the execution (Bartoszewski (1970, p. 182)).) A rabbi and a Catholic priest were also present.

A second execution took place at the facility on 15 December 1941, when Blue Police officers shot 15 Jews. (Note: Some sources give the number of victims as 12 or 16 (Engelking & Leociak (2013, pp. 226, 436); Bartoszewski (1970, p. 182)).) Both events profoundly affected inmates and the broader ghetto population, generating widespread shock that extended to the "Aryan side". Although Jewish Ghetto Police personnel played only supporting roles, they faced significant public condemnation.

Władysław Bartoszewski notes that comparable executions continued in the early months of 1942. As the volume of death sentences issued by the Sondergericht grew, however, German authorities shifted most executions in May 1942 to the penal labor camp in Treblinka. Isolated instances persisted in which selected prisoners were removed from the Central Arrest and executed on ghetto streets. The largest such action occurred on 1 or 2 July 1942, when 110 inmates – including 10 women and 10 Jewish Ghetto Police functionaries – were transported from the facility and shot in Babice, near Warsaw.

On 19 February 1942, the first transport of prisoners from the Central Arrest departed for the penal labor camp at Treblinka I. The group consisted of 50 individuals; in the following months, they were likely employed in construction work that contributed to the establishment of the nearby Treblinka extermination camp.

Grossaktion Warsaw commenced on 22 July 1942. Inmates of the Central Arrest were among the first groups targeted for deportation to Treblinka II, alongside residents of refugee shelters and individuals apprehended on the streets as beggars. Several hundred prisoners were included in the initial transport that left the Umschlagplatz collection point on that same day. They were marched from the prison through Gęsia Street to the Umschlagplatz under escort, in full view of relatives and other ghetto residents gathered along the route. During the deportation period, the Central Arrest served temporarily as one of the assembly points where Jews were held prior to transfer to the Umschlagplatz and subsequent deportation to Treblinka. Amid these events, the prison director, Leopold Lindenfeld, and his deputy, Izaak Rudniański, were killed by German forces.

According to Władysław Bartoszewski, Jewish prisoners continued to be detained at the "Gęsiówka" until the summer of 1942. A report by the chairman of the Warsaw Judenrat for January 1943 references the liquidation of the Central Arrest. The Virtual Shtetl portal, however, dates its closure to 19 April 1943, coinciding with the outbreak of the Warsaw Ghetto Uprising.

As early as autumn 1942, German authorities established an educational labor camp of the Security Police (German: Arbeitserziehungslager der Sicherheitspolizei Warschau) on the "Gęsiówka" premises. Its inmates were primarily Poles detained for minor violations of occupation regulations. In July 1943, the entire complex was incorporated into the newly created Warsaw concentration camp. (Note: After the establishment of the Warsaw concentration camp, prisoners of the educational labor camp were still held on the "Gęsiówka" premises for some time. Only at the turn of November and December 1943 were they transferred to Śródmieście, to 14 Litewska Street (Kopka (2007, p. 44)).)

== Bibliography ==
- Bartoszewski, Władysław (1970). Warszawski pierścień śmierci 1939–1944 [Warsaw's Ring of Death 1939–1944] (in Polish). Warsaw: Interpress.
- Engelking, Barbara; Leociak, Jacek (2013). Getto warszawskie. Przewodnik po nieistniejącym mieście [The Warsaw Ghetto: A Guide to a Non-Existent City] (in Polish). Warsaw: Stowarzyszenie Centrum Badań nad Zagładą Żydów. ISBN 978-83-63444-28-0.
- Grabowski, Jan (2007). "Żydzi przed obliczem niemieckich i polskich sądów w dystrykcie warszawskim Generalnego Gubernatorstwa, 1939–1942" [Jews Before German and Polish Courts in the Warsaw District of the General Government, 1939–1942]. In Engelking, Barbara; Leociak, Jacek; Libionka, Dariusz (eds.). Prowincja noc. Życie i zagłada Żydów w dystrykcie warszawskim [Night Province: Life and Extermination of Jews in the Warsaw District] (in Polish). Warsaw: Centrum Badań nad Zagładą Żydów. ISBN 978-83-63444-03-7.
- Fuks, Marian (1983). Adama Czerniakowa dziennik getta warszawskiego. 6 IX 1939 – 23 VII 1942 [Adam Czerniaków's Warsaw Ghetto Diary: 6 September 1939 – 23 July 1942] (in Polish). Warsaw: Państwowe Wydawnictwo Naukowe. ISBN 83-01-03042-9.
- Hoffman, Zygmunt (1989). "Areszt Centralny w getcie warszawskim" [The Central Arrest in the Warsaw Ghetto]. Biuletyn Żydowskiego Instytutu Historycznego w Polsce (in Polish). 2 (150).
- Komorowski, Krzysztof, ed. (2014). Warszawa walczy 1939–1945. Leksykon [Warsaw Fights 1939–1945: Encyclopedia] (in Polish). Warsaw: Fundacja Warszawa Walczy 1939–1945; Bellona SA. ISBN 978-83-1113474-4.
- Kopka, Bogusław (2007). Konzentrationslager Warschau. Historia i następstwa [Concentration Camp Warsaw: History and Consequences] (in Polish). Warsaw: Instytut Pamięci Narodowej. ISBN 978-83-60464-46-5.
- Person, Katarzyna (2018). Policjanci. Wizerunek Żydowskiej Służby Porządkowej w getcie warszawskim [Policemen: The Image of the Jewish Ghetto Police in the Warsaw Ghetto] (in Polish). Warsaw: Żydowski Instytut Historyczny im. Emanuela Ringelbluma. ISBN 978-83-65254-78-8.
