= Maria Ajzensztadt =

Polish singer

Maria Ajzensztadt

Maria Ajzensztadt (1922–1942; often referred to by a diminutive of her first name Marysia) was a Polish singer, who was murdered in the Holocaust.

She was born in Warsaw to a Polish-Jewish family of Dawid Ajzensztadt, the director of the choir of the Nożyk family synagogue and the Grand Synagogue of Warsaw. After the outbreak of World War II and the start of the German occupation of Poland, she was forced into the Warsaw Ghetto together with her father. She then started a musical career as a singer in various music cafes still operating within the borders of the ghetto, notably the Sztuka cafe at that Ghetto. Her voice gained her the nickname of Nightingale of the Ghetto. She was murdered by the Germans in September 1942. Mixed reports suggest that she was either shot by an SS man as her family boarded a train carrying Jews from the Warsaw Ghetto to Treblinka, or was murdered later, having arrived at that extermination camp.
