= Godlewski =

Godlewski, Godlevsky, Hodlevskyi, or Hadleŭski is a surname with variants in multiple languages. Its Belarusian and Ukrainian forms are generally transcribed beginning with an 'h' but may also appear with a 'g'.

In Poland, the surname is most frequent in north-eastern areas.

Language	Masculine	Feminine	Plural
Polish	Godlewski ([ɡɔˈdlɛfski])	Godlewska ([ɡɔˈdlɛfska])	Godlewscy ([ɡɔˈdlɛfst͡sɨ])
Belarusian (Romanization)	Гадлеўскі (Hadleŭski, Gadleuski)	Гадлеўская (Hadleŭskaja, Hadleuskaya, Hadleuskaia; Gadleuskaja, Gadleuskaya, Gadleuskaia)	
Russian (Romanization)	Годлевский (Godlevsky, Godlevskiy, Godlevskij)	Годлевская (Godlevskaya, Godlevskaia, Godlevskaja)	
Ukrainian (Romanization)	Годлевський (Hodlevskyi, Hodlevskyy, Hodlevskyj; Godlevskyi, Godlevskyy, Godlevskyj)	Годлевська (Hodlevska, Godlevska)	

== People ==
- Antoni Szczęsny Godlewski (1923–1944), Polish Home Army soldier
- Brunon Godlewski (1924–1989), Polish-American WWII airman
- Carl Godlewski (1862–1949), German circus performer
- Emil Godlewski (junior) (1875–1944), Polish embryologist
- Emil Godlewski (senior) (1847–1930), Polish botanist
- Ewa Małas-Godlewska (born 1957), Polish soprano
- Izabella Godlewska (1931–2018), Polish painter and sculptor
- Marceli Godlewski (15 January 1865 – 25 December 1945) Warsaw ghetto priest, who aided in saving Jewish Poles from extermination.
- Marek Godlewski (born 1965), Polish footballer
- Sarah Godlewski (born 1981), American politician
- Stefan Godlewski (1894–1942), Polish poet and novelist
- Vincent Hadleŭski (1898–1942), Belarusian Roman Catholic priest
- Wiktor Godlewski (1831–1900), Polish explorer and naturalist
- Zbyszek Godlewski (1952–1970), Polish protester
