= Zdzisław Król =

Zdzisław Król (8 May 1935 in Zdziebórz – 10 April 2010) was a Polish Roman Catholic priest.

Parents of Zdzisław Król were Bolesław Piotr Król and Marianna née Turek. He had two brothers Stanisław and Jan. During the war, the family sheltered two Jewish brothers, one of whom was killed. Król's father was exiled to Siberia by the Soviets in November 1944, returning home in 1946. Zdzislaw Król in 1953 began his philosophical and theological studies at the Metropolitan Seminary in Warsaw, from which he graduated in 1958 and was ordained a priest. In 1960 he began his studies at the Faculty of Canon Law of the Catholic University of Lublin. In 1966 he received the degree of Doctor of Laws.

In 1967 he began pastoral work in Warsaw parishes and in the chancellery of the Warsaw archdiocese. In 1979 he became chancellor of the Warsaw Metropolitan Curia. He organized the funeral of Primate Stefan Wyszyński, and was part of the committee to build his monument in Warsaw. During martial law, he ex officio dealt with cases of priests invigilated and arrested by the authorities. After the murder of Father Jerzy Popiełuszko, he took up the matter of his burial, and also dealt with issues related to the trial of the priest's killers. In the 1990s, he became involved in Popiełuszko's beatification process, which culminated in his beatification on June 6, 2010, two months after the Król's death in Smolensk.

In 1980s Król became associated with Father Stefan Niedzielak, pastor of St. Charles Borromeo parish in Powązaki. When Niedzielak was assassinated in 1989, King took over the parish after him. He also took over from Niedzielak as chaplain of the Warsaw Katyn Family and the maintenance of the Sanctuary for the Fallen and Murdered in the East. He was also relentless in his efforts to uncover the real murderers of Niedzielak.

In 1992, he stepped down as a chancellor of the Warsaw Metropolitan Curia and became pastor of All Saints parish in Warsaw. He made efforts to honor the memory of priests who saved Jews during the war, most notably Father Marceli Godlewski, who was parish priest at All Saints' during the occupation. He also looked after the memory of priests murdered by the communist authorities. In June 1990, he was appointed to the Council for the Protection of Struggle and Martyrdom Sites, of which he was a member until 2004. On March 18, 1993, he was honored with the dignity of apostolic protonotary. In August 2003, he was named chairman of the New Council of the Foundation for the Construction of the Temple of Divine Providence in Wilanów in Warsaw. It was the only function he continued to conduct after his retirement in 2006.

He died in the 2010 Polish Air Force Tu-154 crash near Smolensk on 10 April 2010. He was posthumously awarded the Order of Polonia Restituta.

== Bibliography ==
- Mandziuk, Józef (2022). "Ksiądz infułat Zdzisław Król – wybitna postać Kościoła warszawskiego" [Mitered prelate, reverend Zdzisław Król – a prominent figure of the Warsaw Church]. Seminare. Poszukiwania Naukowe. 43 (1): 159–175. doi:10.21852/sem.2022.1.10. Archived from the original on 2024-02-07.
