= Emil Godlewski =

Emil Godlewski is the name of:

- Emil Godlewski (senior) (1847–1930), botanist
- Emil Godlewski (junior) (1875–1944), epidemiologist
