= Vital theory =

Vital Force Theory

According to the vital force theory, the conduction of water up the xylem vessel is a result of vital action of the living cells in the xylem tissue. These living cells are involved in the ascent of sap. Relay pump theory and Pulsation theory support the active theory of ascent of sap.

Emil Godlewski (senior) (1884) proposed the Relay pump or Clambering force theory (through xylem parenchyma) and Jagadish Chandra Bose (1923) proposed the pulsation theory (due to pulsatory activities of innermost cortical cells just outside the endodermis).

Jagadish Chandra Bose suggested a mechanism for the ascent of sap in 1927. His theory can be explained with the help of a galvanometer or electric probes. He found electrical ‘pulsations’ or oscillations in electric potentials, and came to believe these were coupled with rhythmic movements in the telegraph plant Codariocalyx motorius (then Desmodium). On the basis of this Bose theorized that regular wave-like ‘pulsations’ in cell electric potential and turgor pressure were an endogenous form of cell signaling. According to him the living cells in the inner lining of the xylem tissue pump water by contractive and expulsive movements similar to the animal heart circulating blood.

This mechanism has not been well supported, and in spite of some ongoing debate, the evidence overwhelmingly supports the cohesion-tension theory for the ascent of sap.

== See also ==
- Cohesion-tension theory
