= Brunon =

Brunon is a male given name. Notable people with the name include:

- Brunon Bendig (1938–2006), Polish amateur boxer
- Brunon Godlewski (1924–1989), Polish-American airman of the Second World War
- Brunon Synak (1943–2013), Kashubian sociologist, politician and local government activist
- Bogdan Brunon Wenta (born 1961), Polish politician and handball coach
