= All Saints Church, Warsaw =

All Saints Church
- Kościół Wszystkich Świętych w Warszawie
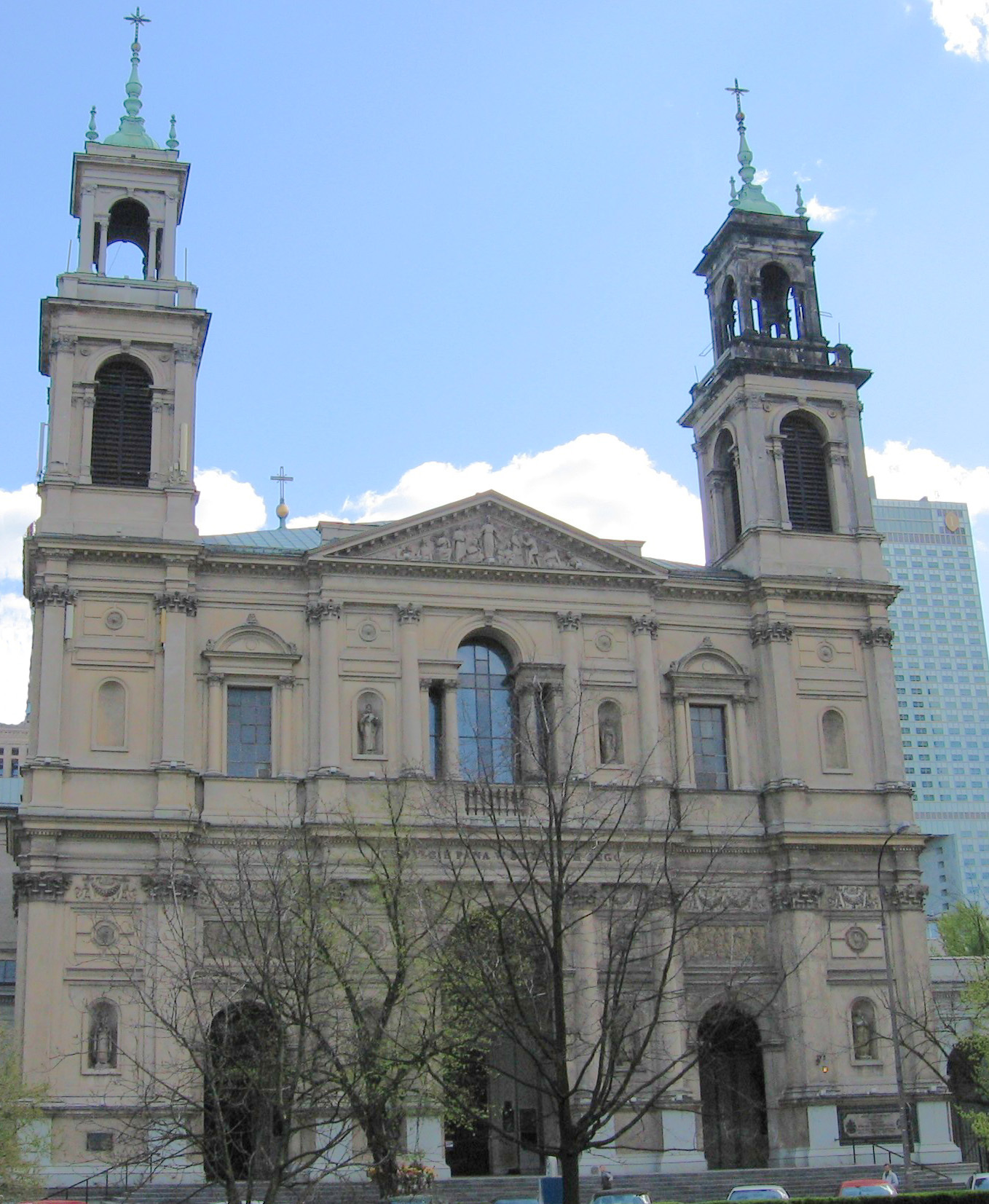
- Church of All Saints.
- All Saints Church
- 52.235000°N 21.003611°E
- Location: Warsaw
- Country: Poland
- Denomination: Roman Catholic
- Website: http://www.wszyscyswieci.pl/

Architecture
- Architect: Enrico Marconi
- Style: Renaissance
- Completed: 1883

Administration
- Archdiocese: Warsaw
- Deanery: Śródmieście
- Parish: All Saints Parish

Clergy
- Pastor: Piotr Waleńdzik

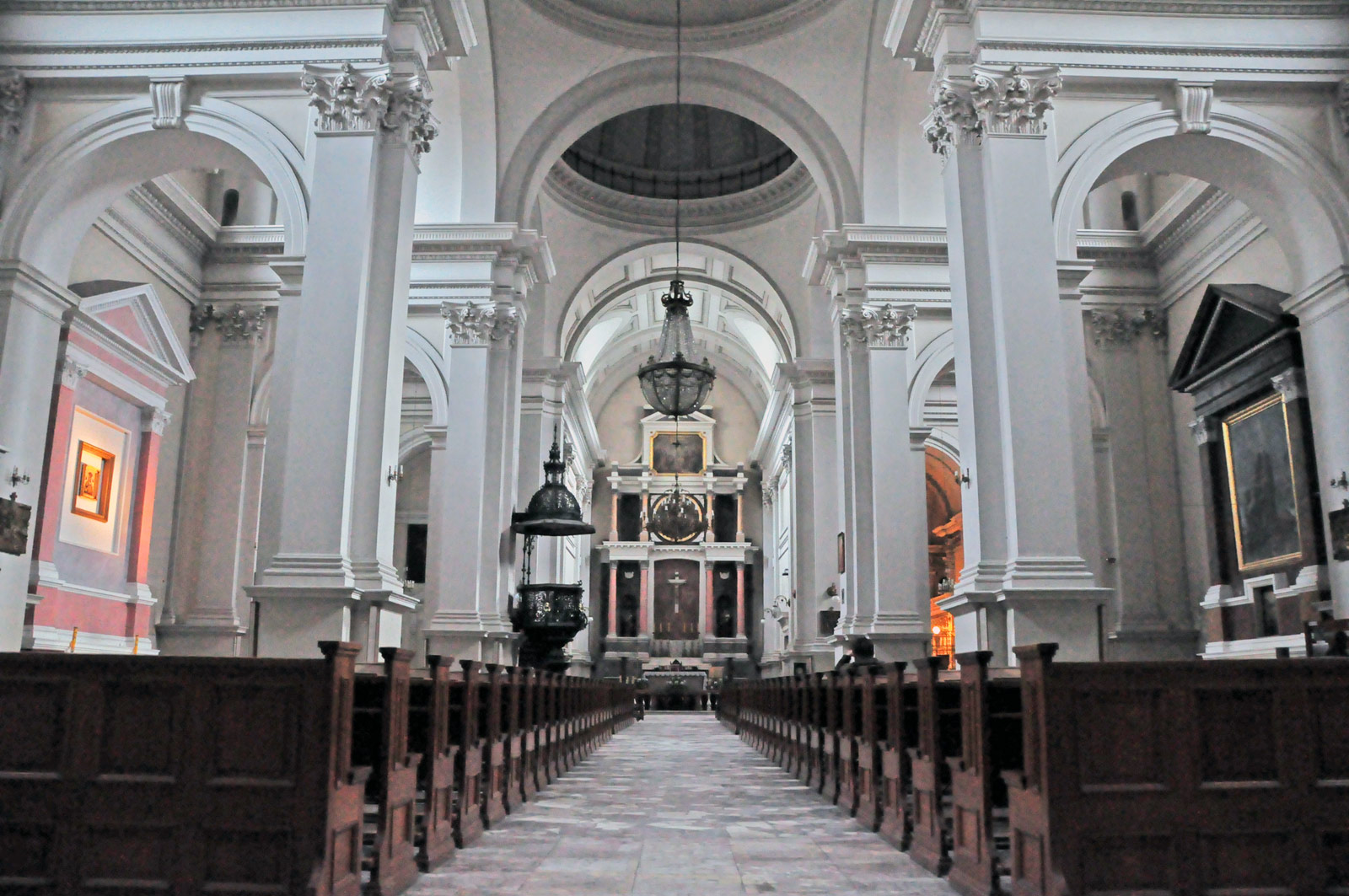
Interior of the church today

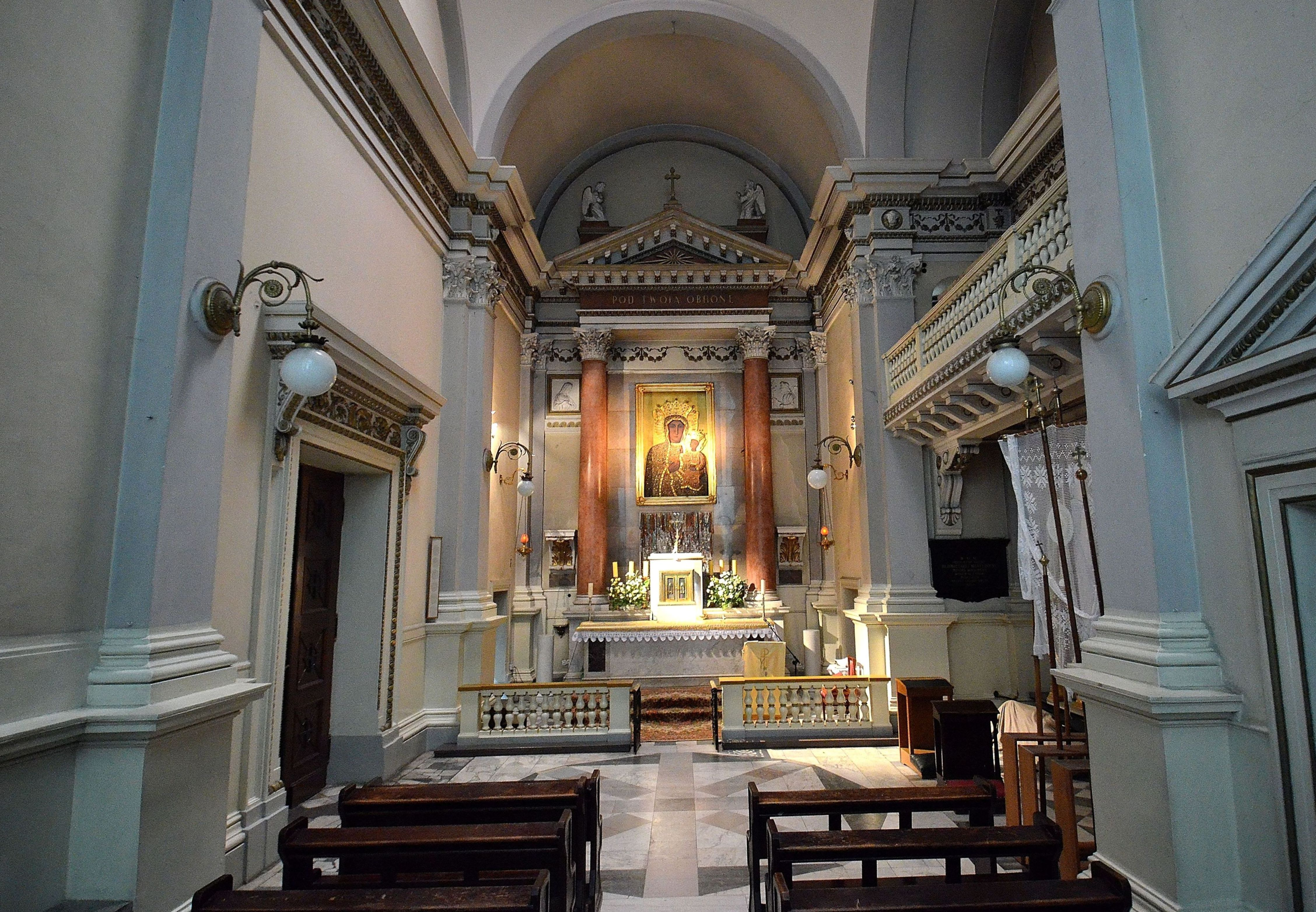
Chapel of Our Lady of Częstochowa

All Saints Church is a Roman Catholic church located at 3/5 Grzybowski Square in Warsaw, the seat of the parish of All Saints in Warsaw.

== History ==
The first plans to found a church in the village of Grzybów near Warsaw emerged in the 17th century, under the rule of King Michał Korybut Wiśniowiecki. It was only in the 19th century that serious work started with the growth of the local population. In 1856 Countess Gabriella Zabiełło donated her Grzybów estate to the Society of Missionary Priests and also provided financial assistance.

The design was by the architect Enrico Marconi, construction work commenced in 1861. The design was modelled on an existing Renaissance style Abbey of Santa Giustina in Padua. The church was dedicated on October 31, 1883, by Archbishop Wincenty Popiel. The church was finally completed in 1892 with the completion of the two bell towers.

During the defensive war in 1939, the roof was slightly damaged. During the occupation, it was one of three Christian churches (two that were operating) in the ghetto (the other two being St. Augustine's Church and the Church of the Nativity of the Blessed Virgin Mary). All Saints Church served Jewish Christians who were detained in the ghetto.

At that time, the parish priest, Fr. Monsignor Marceli Godlewski, known for his antipathy to the Jews before the war, became involved in helping them. At the rectory of the parish, the priest sheltered and helped many escape including: Ludwik Hirszfeld, Louis-Christophe Zaleski-Zamenhof, and Wanda Zamenhof-Zaleska. For his actions in 2009 he was posthumously awarded the Righteous Among the Nations medal.

After the deportation action in 1942, the church was outside the ghetto. It was extensively damaged during the Warsaw Uprising. Aerial bombing and German-led artillery caused part of the roof to collapse and the eastern tower of the temple was also destroyed. Many valuable epitaphs and paintings were also destroyed.

The ruins were stabilised in autumn 1945. Under the stewardship of Mgr. Zygmunt Kaczynski, the reconstruction of the church began. However the parish priest was soon imprisoned by the communist security service and murdered in the Rakowiec District prison. His successors nevertheless continued the reconstruction efforts. For ideological reasons the communists reconstructed the area with large communal housing projects which obscured the church.

On 8 June 1987, during the third apostolic visit to Poland, Pope John Paul II celebrated Mass inaugurating the Second National Eucharistic Congress at All Saints Church. Among the tens of thousands of faithful was Mother Teresa of Calcutta.

In 1993, for the fifteenth anniversary of the pontification of John Paul II, the church unveiled a monument donated by the Italian sculptor Giorgio Gallettiego. Its twin monument is located in the Shrine of Our Lady of Czestochowa in Dozio in Lombardy.

Historical images

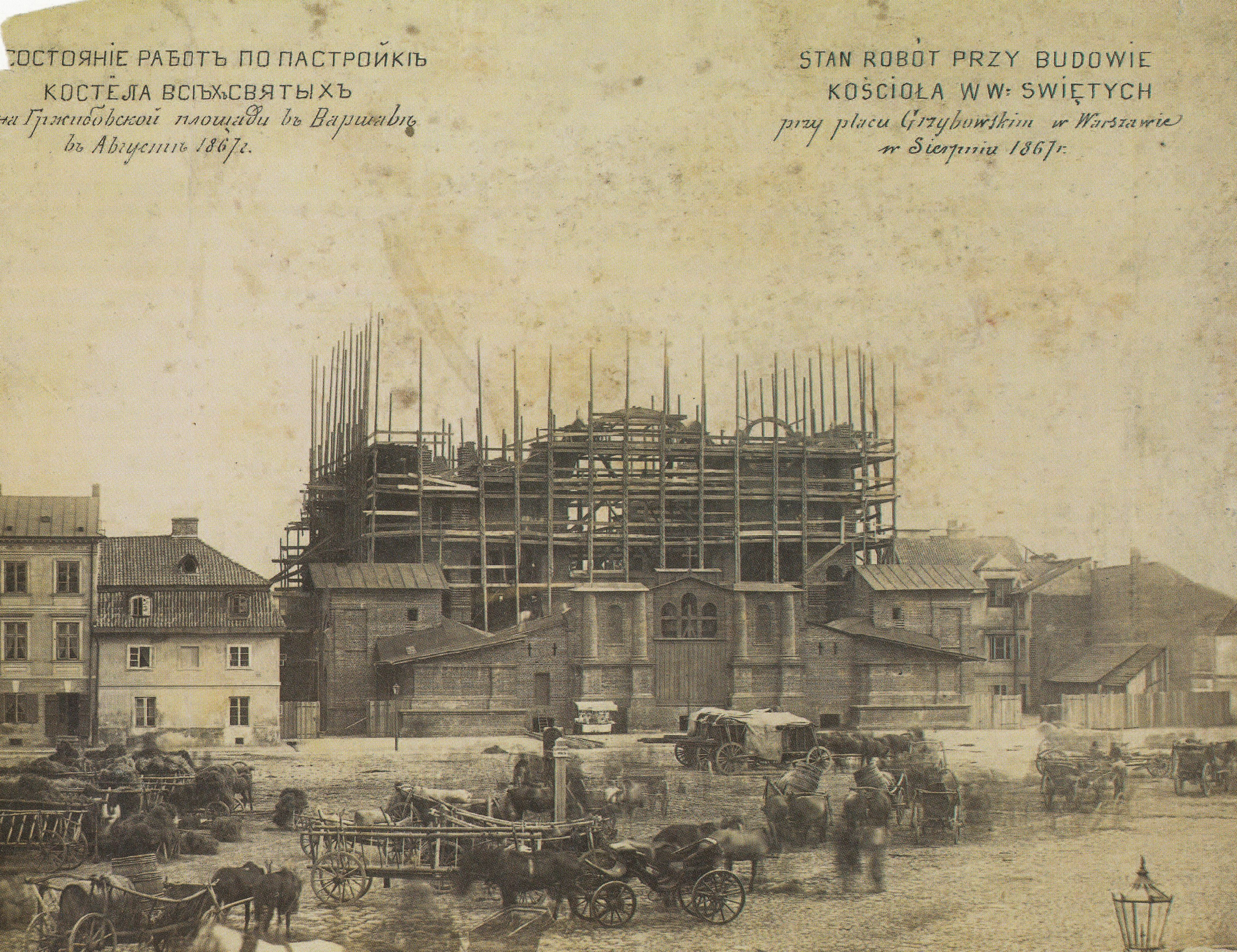
All Saints Church being constructed (August 1867)

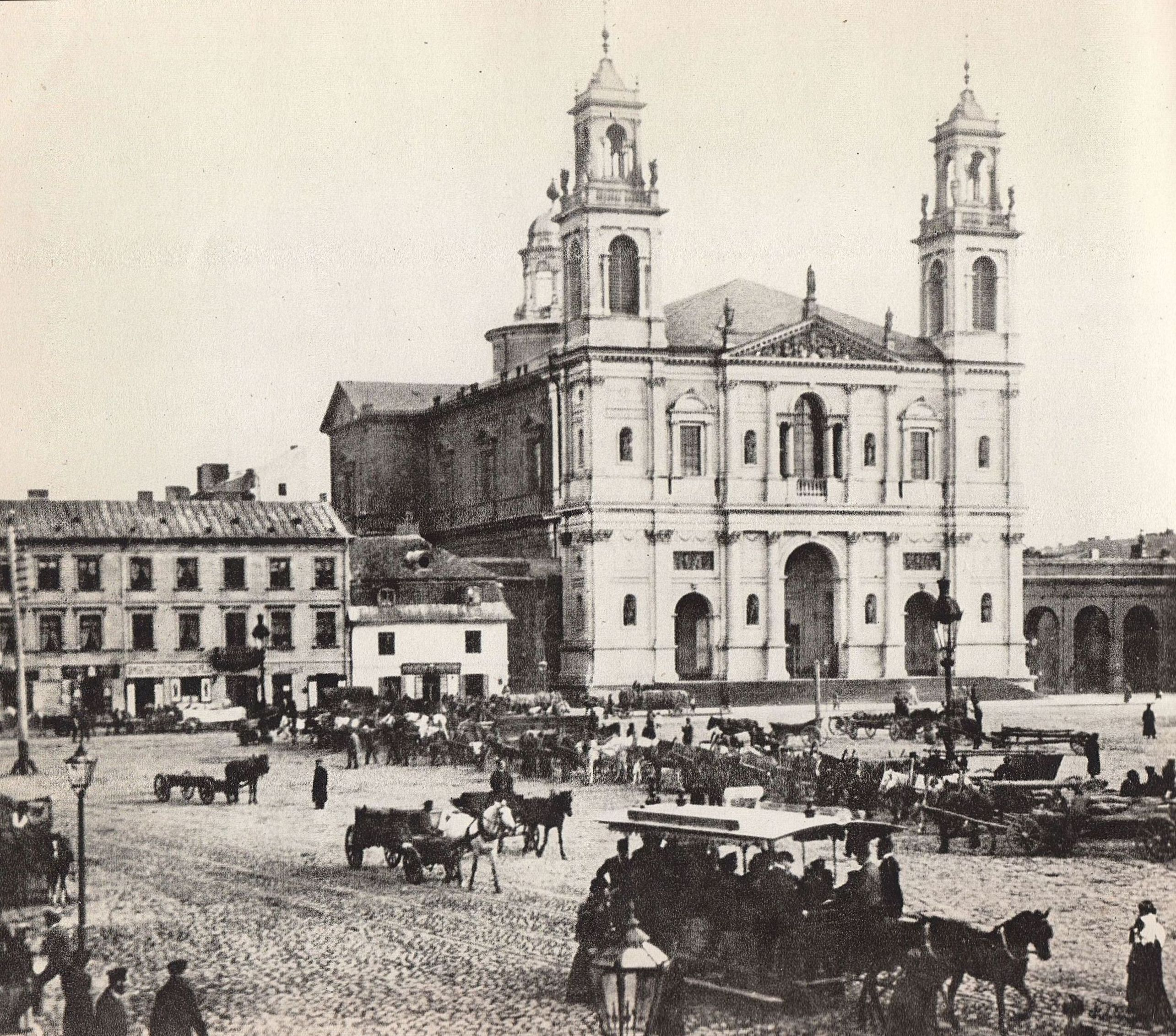
Church on Grzybowski Square in the 2nd half of the 19th century

At a ceremony at the Church of All Saints in Warsaw, proclaiming it as the "House of Life," Polish President Andrzej Duda recalled Fr. Monsignor Marceli Godlewski was known as the "parish priest of the ghetto."

== Architecture ==
It is the largest church in Warsaw. The basic layout is a cross. It has three aisles, a dome mounted at the intersection of the cross vault, the choir and main altar, the side chapel of Our Lady of Częstochowa, a porch and two tall bell towers, all built in the neoclassical style.

There are paintings by the 17th century artist M. L. Willman, a representative of Silesian baroque. The restored marble figure of Jesus the Preacher is by Wiktor Brodzki. The pulpit of wrought iron is based on a design by Dziekinski and Nieniewski. On the 15th anniversary of the office of Pope John Paul II a monument in his honour was placed in front of the church, a donation from the Italian artist Giorgio Galletti.
