= Zygmunt Balicki =

Polish sociologist (1858–1916)

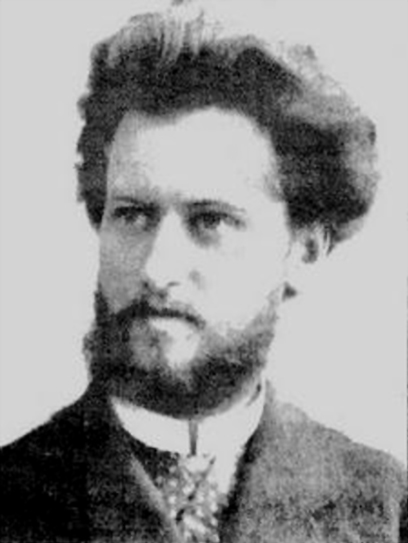
- Born: 30 December 1858; Lublin, Congress Poland
- Died: 12 September 1916 (aged 57); Saint Petersburg, Russia
- Known for: National Democracy
- Spouse: Gabriela Balicka-Iwanowska (married 1891)
- Scientific career
- Fields: Psychology; Sociology; Political theory

Zygmunt Balicki (30 December 1858 in Lublin – 12 September 1916 in Saint Petersburg) was a Polish sociologist, publicist and one of the first leading thinkers of the modern Polish nationalism in the late 19th century under the foreign Partitions of Poland. Balicki developed his original political thought inspired by the ideals of Aleksander Świętochowski from the movement of Positivism which was marked by the attempts at trying to stop the wholesale Russification and Germanization of the Poles ever since the Polish language was banned in reprisal for the January Uprising. Balicki was a key protagonist in the National Democratic campaign of antisemitic agitation.

== Life ==
Zygmunt Balicki was born on 30 December 1858 in Lublin. His father was Seweryn Tomasz Balicki, and his mother was Karolina Balicka, née Gruszczyńska. The Balickis (Ostoja coat of arms) were an impoverished family of landowners who cultivated patriotic traditions. Zygmunt's grandfather, Józef Balicki, was a cavalryman in the Napoleonic guard. Seweryn Balicki was a clerk in the Lublin governorate administration.

In 1876, with his matriculation examination, Zygmunt graduated from the Male Middle School in Lublin, which was a typical example of the Russification policy of the partitioning government.

After his matriculation examination, Zygmunt took up law studies at St. Petersburg University. At the same time, he attended classes at the St. Petersburg Academy of Painting. Already then, his extraordinary drawing skills became apparent.

During his studies in St. Petersburg, he established contacts with Russian and Polish revolutionary circles. In the case of the former, they were people connected with "Narodnoya Volya". The latter was the "Community of Polish Socialists" in St. Petersburg, which Zygmunt joined with his brother Tadeusz in 1879.

In 1880, after completing his studies in the Russian capital Zygmunt. returned to Warsaw, where he took up a position of a court trainee at the local District Court. There was also a second purpose for his stay in Warsaw. He was commissioned by the Petersburg authorities of the Commune of Polish Socialists to create its structures in the Polish capital.

Already during his studies Balicki became known as a talented organiser. "He was a man of extensive knowledge, great talents and a good speaker, as well as being very handsome and shapely. He also enjoyed the great confidence of his colleagues and was widely liked by his female colleagues. (Hłasko).

There was a discussion within the Polish Socialist Commune on the fundamental issue of whether it was possible to reconcile the programme of the fight for Poland's independence with socialist postulates. Balicki was an ardent advocate of the "independence programme", i.e. focusing the efforts to regain national sovereignty on the broadest possible social base (not excluding the "class of the owners"), and postponing the implementation of the social programme until after the reconstruction of the Polish state.

In February 1881, the tsarist police broke up the Warsaw organization of the Polish Socialist Commune. Zygmunt managed to avoid arrest. He found refuge in Lwów and he continued his political activity in Galicia. He started to cooperate with socialist sympathizers among students of the Lwów universities (University and Polytechnic) as well as the Agricultural Academy in Dublany. He published his first political articles in the socialist biweekly "Praca" [Work] published in the capital of Galicia.

His activity in this field was so dynamic that already in 1882 he was called "one of the leaders of Lwów socialism". (Ignacy Daszyński). This did not escape the attention of the Austrian police, who at the end of 1882 carried out numerous arrests of Lwów socialist activists.

On 10 May 1883 Balicki was sentenced to four months' imprisonment in a trial brought before the National Criminal Court in Lwów against the entire Galician socialist organisation. After serving his sentence, he - formally a subject of the Russian Tsar - was threatened with extradition to the Russian authorities. He awaited his fate in police custody in Lwów. His escape abroad, that was being organised by local socialists, did not succeed.

Eventually, however, the governor of Galicia, Count Alfred Potocki, decided not to extradite Balicki. The decision was replaced by deportation from the Austrian partition and the entire Austro-Hungarian monarchy. By the end of 1883, Balicki left Galicia for Switzerland.

This thirteen-year-long stay in the Helvetian country (initially in Zurich, and later in Geneva) was a time of Balicki's intense political and scientific activity.

He came to Switzerland as a socialist. In Geneva, he became acquainted with the doyen of Polish ("independence") socialism, Bolesław Limanowski. This is how he became active in the Socialist Association "Polish Folk" [Lud Polski], founded in 1881 by Limanowski in Paris.

Parallel to this, Balicki developed his scientific interests in Switzerland. At that time he was focused on completely new fields of knowledge of the era: sociology and social psychology.

In 1896, on the basis of his dissertation "L'Etat, comme organisation coercitive de la societe politique (The State as a coercive organisation of the political society), Balicki obtained a doctorate in law at the University of Geneva. Even before his doctorate, he published treatises on sociology of politics in the international scientific press. In 1895 the "Revue internationale de sociologie" [International Journal of Sociology] published his article "L'organisation spontanee de la societe civile" [Spontaneous organisation of civil society].

A measure of Balicki's recognition as a scientist was his appointment as a correspondent member of the Institut International de Sociologie (International Sociological Institute) in Paris after completing his doctoral degree.

At the beginning of his stay in Switzerland, the question of his membership in freemasonry was widely discussed among his friends and political associates. B. did not deny his membership in one of the Geneva freemasonry lodges. He treated it - as Władysław Jabłonowski reported later - purely pro forma, as a condition for faster acquisition of Swiss citizenship. This in turn was a prerequisite for carrying out scientific activity crowned with a doctorate.

Balicki obtained Swiss citizenship in 1891. At the beginning of this year, on 3 January 1891, he married the thirteen years younger Gabriela Ivanovska, who was studying botany at the Geneva University.

Balicki's material existence in Switzerland was difficult. In this respect it was no different from his "Polish years". He had no permanent employment and earned his living as a casual labourer. His talent as a draughtsman allowed him to earn money, for example, as the author of illustrations for the well-known "Atlas of normal human anatomy", published in 1891 by Professor Zygmunt Laskowski, dean of the Faculty of Medicine at the local university.

The beginning of a political breakthrough in his life was the acquaintance in Switzerland in 1886 with Colonel Zygmunt Miłkowski (literary pseudonym Teodor Tomasz Jeż), a veteran of the January Uprising associated with the democratic wing of Polish emigration. Balicki fully accepted Miłkowski's programme presented in his 1887 booklet "On Active Defence and the National Treasury", around which the Polish League led by Miłkowski was established.

By 1888 at the latest, Balicki was already a member of this organisation. In August 1888, he took part in the convention of the Polish League members in Hilfikon near Zurich, where he co-authored the statute of the organisation. It was thanks to him that Balicki Limanowski joined the Polish League at that time.

His stay in Switzerland did not mean that Balicki broke off his contacts with Poland. In 1886, on the instructions of Miłkowski, he went to Cracow and Warsaw, where he studied the possibilities of political organization of Polish academic youth. During these meetings, Balicki proposed the idea of creating a unified secret organization for all Polish students, both those studying at universities in the divided Poland and those studying outside the Polish territory.

This idea materialized on 14 January 1887 with the establishment of the secret Union of Polish Youth ("Zet") in Krakow. Balicki.'s participation in the establishment of "Zet" was one of his greatest achievements as a political activist. A year after the establishment of the organization, Balicki, as a representative of the Polish League Centralization, led to the formal association of "Zet" with the League.

Although the Union of Polish Youth was "an agglomerate of the most contradictory elements". (Stefan Żeromski), it can be treated as a real forge of cadres of the national-democratic camp. The most important points of "Zet's" political programme were "the independence of Poland and the liberation and nationalisation of the people". (Kozicki).

The organisational structure of "Zet" based on three degrees of initiation ("colleagues", "comrades", "brothers") was the work of Balicki Considering the fact that he joined freemasonry, it was assumed that the structure of secrecy present in Masonic lodges was the prototype.

The strengthening of Balicki's ties with the Polish League and his involvement in the establishment and expansion of "Zet" went hand in hand with his political activity in other fields. In December 1891, he was one of the founders of the Union of Polish Exiles, which referred to the tradition of the Polish Democratic Society in exile.

In 1892 Balicki joined the Foreign Union of Polish Socialists (ZZSP), the parent organisation of the Polish Socialist Party. In the ZZSP, he held the post of treasurer. When in 1894 the convention of the ZZSP decided that it was impossible for its members to belong to other political organisations, Balicki decided to leave its ranks. He thus severed his last organisational links with the socialist movement.

However, this was not only a matter of form. In 1895, in a farewell article published in the socialist "Przedświt", Balicki explained that the reason for his parting with socialism was ideological. He addressed his polemic to the pro-independence direction represented by the PPS, which was dominant in the Polish socialist movement. He accused it of underestimating the significance of the "right to parallelism", which - as he stressed - meant the necessity to combine the struggle for social goals with the struggle for socialism. - meant the necessity to combine the struggle for social and national goals. Balicki also found unacceptable the view fixed in the PPS about the natural leadership of workers in the fight for national liberation.

At the same time, Balicki rejected the thesis formulated by Kazimierz Kelles-Krauz - the main creator of the political thought of the independence trend in Polish socialism - that the struggle for independence favoured socialism, as the yoke of the partitioning power made it impossible to quickly achieve a socialist system. "What if it did? If a foreign government ensured all political freedoms except national ones, would it cease to be a yoke, would the author [Kelles - Krauz] then sell the personal and public dignity of the proletariat and the independence of Poland for thirty pieces of silver with a party stamp?".

When Balicki wrote these words he already belonged to the National League, which was established in 1893 on the initiative of Roman Dmowski, who made domestic activists connected with Miłkowski's organisation independent from the Swiss centralisation of the Polish League. Dmowski's right hand in this undertaking was Balicki himself.

A detailed project of the "Polish League reform" was worked out by Balicki and submitted to Dmowski in Switzerland in the summer of 1892. All the rules of conspiracy were observed. The plan of action regarding the establishment of a new organisation was written down by Balicki in "chemical ink on the reverse side of the album with views of Versailles that Dmowski took home". (Kozicki).

The National League was founded on 1 April 1893 in Warsaw, and during its first years of existence it operated on the basis of a statute authored by Balicki He did not join the highest authorities of the National League until August 1897. The second Congress of the National League General Council held in Budapest elected him a member of the Central Committee of the organization.

Since the establishment of the National League, which coincided with his severance of ties with the socialist movement, Balicki became increasingly involved in the organisational and programmatic development of the nascent All-Polish movement.

An expression of this activity was his participation as a representative of the National League in the 11th session of the Polish National Alliance (ZNP), the largest Polish organization in the United States, held in Cleveland in September 1895. The result of the ZNP deliberations was the establishment of cooperation between the National Treasury in Rapperswil and the National Treasury in Milwaukee. On the initiative of Balicki on 19 September 1895, the "Act of Incorporation of the National League in the United States" was signed in Chicago.

In March 1896, Balicki and his wife settled in Munich. From there he led the reconstruction of the "Zet" structures, which were broken up in 1894 after the arrests by the Tsarist police in connection with the organisation of demonstrations by its members on the centenary of the Kościuszko Uprising.

Thanks to the efforts of Balicki "Zet" resumed its activities in 1898. This so-called second "Zet" also included Polish students at domestic and foreign universities, and in its programme it definitely reflected the All-Polish programme. People with socialist sympathies were no longer accepted into its ranks.

The stay of Balicki in Munich lasted less than two years. At the beginning of 1898, he returned to Poland. He settled in Krakow, hoping to continue his scientific career there. In 1903 he was offered a chair (as associate professor) of sociology at the Jagiellonian University. However, the offer was linked to the condition that Balicki ceased his political activity. However, he did not want to agree to this. "He postponed the thought of a chair for calmer times, when the duties of national work would be lifted from his shoulders. He did not live to see this chair". (Mosdorf).

Balicki's attempt to find employment at the Jagiellonian Library was also unsuccessful. As explained by its director Karol Estreicher, the applicant did not meet the formal requirements (he did not have a doctoral degree from any Austrian university), and what was worse, "he had the opinion of a socialist". It is worth noting, however, that for Polish conservatives, the nascent national-democratic movement also belonged to "extreme parties".

In this situation, his main source of income were the fees received for his journalistic activity.

After arriving in Kraków, Balicki took up his duties as a commissioner of the National League in Galicia. "The Balickis' apartment in Kraków, in the Debniki district, was really a vestibule to the National Democracy temple, and its charm was such that it was impossible to turn back halfway. [...] No-one active in the movement could avoid the hospitable house. Here he met and got to know everyone he needed to know'. (Plutyński).

After returning to Galicia, Balicki not only worked on developing the structures of the national democratic movement in this part of divided Poland. He was also active as a journalist, for example in the "All-Polish Review", which was published in Lwów from 1895 onwards. - the main press organ of the forming camp.

It was at that time that he was specifying the reasons for his parting with socialism. In 1898, in the pages of the theoretical magazine of the National League published in Lwów, "Kwartalnik Naukowo - Polityczny i Społecznego" ("Scientific, Political and Social Quarterly"), he published an article entitled "Critical remarks on contemporary socialism". Balicki rejected socialist egalitarianism, i.e. "striving for the greatest possible equality between people" and "equal distribution of wealth". As he pointed out "equality in social relations by itself does not yet mean a high level of culture and high social forms, which is best proved by primitive societies".

Balicki also saw serious dangers in the "legal compulsion of a rational state", i.e. statism, which would be a natural consequence of the implementation of the socialist programme. He did not accept ascribing to the omnipotent state the role of the basic tool for introducing "progressive" social reforms. According to Balicki, "state power and the legal coercion which follows it, play an often complementary role in social life [...] there is a lack of spontaneous initiative, cooperation and organisation of society, a lack of connection in collective activities and solidarity and cohesion among its members".

According to Balicki, the consequence of the realisation of the socialist postulate of the nationalisation of the "means of production" would not be the liberation of workers, but the creation of "a host of state bureaucracy, endowed with enormous power". This "new privileged class" would rule over "a mass of state mercenaries deprived of their own organisation, linked to each other only by central institutions and their branches".

Finally, socialism was incompatible with the programme of national solidarity. In his article, Balicki noted that "no one sows greater class and partisan antagonisms, greater internal hatreds than those who appear under the slogan of abolishing antagonisms and national hatreds. Wishing to organise international solidarity, they begin by disorganising their own nation".

In the same text from 1898, Balicki stressed that his parting with socialism did not mean abandoning democratic traditions, which were the basis of the "All-Polish" movement: "After all, history is not only a class struggle, it is also a process of progressive socialisation; democratism, which is an expression of this historical current, aims at ever greater social solidarity, and at the same time fulfils a thoroughly national role".

In 1902, Balicki's thesis was published. "National egoism towards ethics". Next to Roman Dmowski's "Thoughts of a Modern Pole", published a year later, and Jan Ludwik Popławski's journalism, it had the greatest influence on the formulation of the basic elements of the political thought of the "All-Polishers".

The main thesis of the book consists in opposing the "ideal ethics" - i.e. striving to achieve individual moral perfection, affirming general humanism, and finally political altruism - the "ethics of ideas". The latter was defined by Balicki as "the real good of the concrete society to which a given individual belongs". This is how he saw the transition to the principle of national egoism. Its adoption is necessary because, as Balicki argued. - "the right to an independent existence is vested only in nations with a strong individuality, able to fight and win for this existence, able to oppose force with force, to avenge the wrongs suffered and to ensure that justice prevails".

The "national ethic" thus outlined by Balicki was based on the fundamental conviction that the nation "encompasses the whole of man's comprehensive life". Consequently, the conduct of a human citizen is to be "always and everywhere subject to one, universal and absolute law of social ethics [ethics of ideas]". This included the injunction to subordinate man's actions in society to "self-determined national egoism".

However, this did not mean that Balicki transferred the principles of Darwinism ("struggle for existence") without any restrictions to the social matter or international relations. Admittedly - as Balicki wrote - "a nation, as a living organism, has a moral right to grow not only at the cost of passive, thoughtless and socially formless elements, but even at the cost of other nations", he added at once, however, with a reservation: "so long as this growth is natural and not based on brute force, coercion and exceptional laws".

Balicki emphasised in his treatise that "raised to the dignity of an ethical banner, the nation does not thereby become an end, capable of all means of sanctification; it constitutes only the conscience of the human citizen". The fundamental aim of the policy of "national egoism" was to strive for the greatness of the nation. However, this aim – he emphasised - did not sanctify the means, for it was above all the spiritual dimension of freedom that was at stake: "A nation that is spiritually great, great in the power of self-determined egoism, will not humble itself to abuses and violations, because it highly values its dignity, has respect for its own culture and reverence for its banner, which as a soldier it will not tarnish with murder or stealthy murder".

His words resound with the heritage of the political thought of Polish Romanticism. One can see in them what another activist of the national-democratic movement called "a synthesis of romantic and positivist thought". From Romanticism, the movement's thought took "the definition of further goals" and "the concept of the nation and the cult of national feeling", and from positivism "close consideration of the conditions of time and place". (Kozicki).

The combination of these two traditions of thinking about politics can also be seen in B.'s description of the "soldier-citizen" in "Egoizm narodowym wobec etyki" ["National egoism vs Ethics"]. Here, as Balicki stressed, it was not a matter of stimulating the "militaristic spirit", but rather of appealing to the "chivalrous spirit": "the craft [of war] lies not in killing, but in the readiness to go to death, to give one's life in the service of society".

In his concept, the soldier-citizen raised in the "national ethic" was to be guided "not by the advantage of force, but by the advantage of justice". The role models here were - as Balicki stressed - the participants of all the Polish national uprisings. - participants of all the Polish national uprisings. Their ethos reflected what was most important for every soldier-citizen, namely, the primacy of spirit: "He is not a soldier who wears a uniform and a baton, but he who has a soldier character and a soldier spirit. These qualities can be combined with any profession, any position and any kind of work [...]. In this sense, a soldier is the best politician in a nation that has been declared a life-and-death struggle".

"National Egoism vs Ethics" was the most famous publication of Balicki. Not only because the ideas it contained found approval and continuators in the All-Polish camp itself. In 1905, Roman Dmowski in his Fundamentals of National Policy referred to the distinction made by Balicki between individual and collective ethics. Balicki's dissertation became notorious also due to polemicists from conservative and Catholic circles, who criticised this distinction between two ethical orders as "the purest chauvinism, permeated by hackatism" (conservatives) or neo-populism (neo-Catholics). (conservatives) or a neo-pagan, idolatrous cult of the nation (Catholic publicists).

The stay of Balicki in Krakow lasted until 1905. During this time, he led the development of the structures of the National League in the Austrian partition, but also in the Prussian district (in Great Poland and Upper Silesia). This also included the development of "Zet" structures, as well as involvement in political educational activities among the Polish people. This was the nature of the establishment of peasants' Falcon nests by Balicki, as well as the activity of the People's School Society. This organization, which was founded in Krakow in 1891, was taken over by the National League at the beginning of the 20th century. Balicki's contribution to this undertaking could not be overestimated.

Balicki was also a patron of other initiatives aiming to extend the influence of the national democratic movement. In this context, we should mention the National Aid Union founded in Kraków in 1902, a charitable organisation related to the National League, providing material aid to political refugees from the two other partitions.

In 1903, on his initiative, the Society for the Nurturing of Social Sciences was founded in Kraków. Its main aim was to provide education in political and social issues, but it was also intended to serve as a place for the exchange of ideas between the still strongly conflicted "All-Polishers" and Kraków conservatives.

The political breakthrough of 1905 caused by Russia's defeat in the war with Japan and the outbreak of revolution in the Romanov Empire, as well as the fact that the most developed structures of the national democratic movement existed in the Kingdom of Poland, made its leadership move its main activity to the Russian partition. This was the background to Balicki's decision to move (together with his wife) to Warsaw.

After 1905, the leadership of the day-to-day activities of the National Democratic Party rested in the hands of Roman Dmowski. As a member of the governing bodies of both the Party and the National League until the outbreak of World War I, Balicki focused primarily on journalistic and writing activity.

In January 1908, on the initiative of Balicki, Przegląd Narodowy (National Review) was established in Warsaw, which took over from Przegląd Wszechpolski (All-Polish Review), closed down in 1905, as the most important press organ of the national democratic movement. Balicki became the chief editor of the new monthly. As Zygmunt Wasilewski recalled years later: "a monthly as a central laboratory of guiding thought for such an exuberantly expanding movement was indispensable. Balicki was a perfect manager for such a job: a sociologist, psychologist, excellent publicist, organiser gifted with an extraordinary imagination for the machinery of life, and at the same time, as an artist, gifted with an aesthetic sense, so necessary in every job".

As editor of the National Review, Balicki gathered an extraordinary group of authors around the magazine. Even though the profile of this periodical was decidedly political, it was published by people who were not associated with current political activity, such as Ignacy Chrzanowski, Jan Karol Kochanowski, Jan Kucharzewski, Władysław Konopczyński or Adam Szelągowski.

Between 1908 and 1910, Balicki also cooperated with national democratic newspapers published in Warsaw: These were "Głos Warszawski" (Voice of Warsaw) and "Gazeta Warszawska" (Warsaw Daily). In the latter, he took over the management of the socio-political section, which was key to the newspaper's profile.

His journalism from the years 1905-1914 reflected the main threads of political disputes in which the national democratic movement was engaged in the last years before the outbreak of the First World War. In this case, it was a matter of defining relations with conservatism and socialism, as well as a debate that had far-reaching consequences for the organisational cohesion of the All-Polish camp, as to who would be the main enemy and potential ally of the Polish cause during the upcoming clash of great powers.

The latter issue aroused most political emotions, and the anti-German option described by Dmowski in "Niemiec, Rosji i kwestii polskiej"(Germany, Russia and the Polish Question). The anti-German option described by Dmowski in "Germany, Russia and the Polish Question" (1908) (which meant "orientation towards the Entente", whose representative in our part of Europe was Russia) became the reason for a number of secessions within the national-democratic movement in 1907–1911. The most painful for Balicki was the departure of "Zet" and the Galician branch of the Democratic and National Party, i.e. organisations which he co-founded and led for some time.

Secessionists accused the "Dmowski line" of being pro-Russian. In this orientation dispute, Balicki consistently took a position supporting the leader of the National Democratic Party. Like Dmowski, he separated his personal antipathy towards the Russians and their culture from the political benefits for the Polish cause that may be derived from joining the Entente against the German expansionism.

As early as in the pages of the All-Polish Review in 1896, Balicki wrote: "We belong to the West by history, tradition and culture, so the decaying influence of the eastern wind threatens us twice: our national and civilizational future". According to Balicki, the basic mistake that the conservative loyalists made towards Russia after 1864 was to overestimate the significance for the Polish cause of the internal differences in political attitudes among the Russians. "The differences of outlook concern only the means of moral conquest and the sauce in which we are to be eaten. There is actually no difference," stressed Balicki - between Russians unreservedly devoted to the idea of building a 'Tsaroslav' empire and Russian revolutionaries: "all of them, as to one thing, are Russificationists on our ground and never treat us as an equal nation".

However, the turn of 1905 - the weakening of Russia, the entry of the tsarist empire on the path of building a constitutional monarchy combined with the increasing expansion of Germany - created a new political situation.

In 1908, in Przegląd Narodowy, Balicki argued that "Russia has been weakened internally and externally, and has ceased to play the role of the axis around which international politics revolved a few years ago". In the same article ("In view of the new situation"), he pointed out that "in Russia, after the recent events, all the old plans for the renationalisation of the Poles have finally gone bankrupt. Germany is ready to further expand its Polish possessions, while Russia cannot cope with the old ones".

Against the background of a weakening Russia, the increasing expansionary power of the German Reich was all the more apparent, manifested, according to Balicki, in German "racial instincts, excessive militarism on land and sea, overpopulation looking for an outlet, the economic situation requiring ever new markets, domestic political considerations" and "the personal qualities of the monarch [German Emperor and King Wilhelm II of Prussia]". The conclusion that Balicki drew from this conjecture in 1908 was: "The Hohenzollern state is preparing for a new [blood] spilling and that towards the whole line of the east and south-east from the Baltic to Constantinople"

In the last years before the outbreak of the Great War, Balicki continued his "reckoning" with socialism. This time he referred to his interests in social psychology, stating in 1912 in the pages of the National Review that socialism should be regarded as "a symptom of social pathology and psychopathy" with two dominant types of behaviour: "revolutionary - spy" and "revolutionary - bandit".

Three years earlier, in the pages of a monthly he edited, Balicki had written about "socialist training", which "breaks characters and people in us, degenerates them, makes them unfit for fruitful civic work". Equally harmful was the socialist "idea of reform in the family, marriage and sex life".

In his political writings, like those of other leading representatives of the national democratic movement, there was no lack of sharp attacks on the representatives of Polish conservatism at the beginning of the 20th century. He accused them of abandoning the cause of Poland's independence, social egoism and "passively sticking to the past".

However, if one reads his journalism from 1905 to 1914, it is clear that it is more about attacks on conservatives than on conservatism. The political thought of Balicki (just like Dmowski at the same time) revealed many points of contact with conservative thought.

This is how the term "national conservatism" used by Balicki should be perceived. The definition of the nation presented by him, devoid of ethnic connotations, and emphasizing instead the cultural motif, was also close to conservatism. In the aforementioned polemic with Kazimierz Kelles-Krauz: "national unity is not a tactic of any kind, it is not even a programme or a political indication, but a simple sociological fact, which may not be understood, but which does not cease to be a fact because of this. It is not any synthesis of conflicting class interests, but a separate sphere of life incommensurable with them, embracing language (not always, anyway), literature, art, customs, national character. In a word, culture in the broadest sense".

From this point of view, the nation was no different from the "organic entities" so accented in conservative thought, which were the result of long-term development. The prospect of a rapprochement with conservative thought was also opened by Balicki's statement from 1909 that "the state arose earlier than the nation".

It can be said that, in this way, Balicki was in line with the view on the relationship between the state and the nation dominant in the national-democratic movement. A similar approach to this issue was adopted by Dmowski in Fundamentals of Polish Politics (1905), writing that "the nation is a product of state existence". In the political thought of the All-Polish camp, the categories of "nation" and "state" were not perceived as contradictory, but as complementary to each other. Without its own strong state, the nation will never be able to achieve its full development.

The rejection of socialist egalitarianism and Balicki's recognition of the existence of natural hierarchies within the nation was another element in common with conservative thought. In 1908 he wrote about the necessity of an "aristocracy of competence" in the nation. On the other hand, the "leading layer" was described by the Kraków "stańczycy". (Szujski). Balicki pointed out that the most important task of this national elite was to lead "the citizenship of the people". At the same time, he stressed that "any notion of democracy, not based on the principle of competence and talents of those who exert influence and hold power, is a simple misuse of the term".

In 1905 Balicki emphasised that the Polish nation, deprived of the state, "deported, destroyed, disorganised, and even outright exterminated mechanically and spiritually" naturally "had to be conservative". At the beginning of the twentieth century, however, the point - emphasised Balicki - that this conservatism should be "creative". In this context, he pointed to the need for a synthesis of conservativeness and "real progress", because "conservativeness and creativity in the life of a nation are most closely linked, they permeate each other in such a way that they cannot be separated without significant damage to its very vitality".

Like Dmowski at the time, Balicki also pointed to two models to follow: England and Japan. The former "throughout its history has never broken either its organisation or the principles of its political system, but has continued to develop them organically, without imitating anyone". The latter, on the other hand, was able to combine modernisation in the sphere of material civilisation with "an unshakeable traditional national organisation, beliefs, customs and the core of its forms of existence".

His pointing to culture as the fundamental binder and determinant of belonging to the Polish national community meant, in his opinion, that there was no chance for the Jewish population to assimilate into the Polish nation. Jews - as Balicki wrote in 1912 in National Review - are a community "closed tightly in their own spirituality, too crystallized by centuries of one-sided and exclusive living".

Balicki's anti-Semitism, like that of other creators of his camp's political thought, was of a cultural and economic rather than biological nature. The word "race" used in his public writings did not have a biological connotation, but a sociological and cultural one (similarly to the term "British race" used in Britain at the same time).

Balicki defined his attitude to Jews as a result of "objective" factors and not as a result of succumbing to "dark anti-Semitism" or "racial hatred". In addition to the above-mentioned observation of the lack of chances for assimilation of Jews into Polish culture (he even pointed to the danger of a reverse process), there was also a factor in the form of cooperation of the Jewish population with the partitioning authorities and the economic activity of Jews, which was an obstacle to the development of Polish economic life.

In 1912, in National Review, at the time of the boycott of Jewish trade announced by National Democracy, Balicki wrote about the need to "support your own national production, buying only from your own people, buying land and not selling it to foreigners, defending the national language and customs, counteracting foreign influences in opinion".

His publicism, which did not avoid sharp and polemical clashes, did not bring him repression from the partitioning authorities. However, they were caused by an article he published in 1908 in the pages of National Review entitled "Szymon Konarski's programme", which referred to an emissary of the Towarzystwo Demokratyczne Polski (Polish Democratic Society) and the founder of an underground network in the "partitioned territories" in the 1830s.

For this publication, Balicki was sentenced by a Russian court to a year in prison. He started serving his sentence in February 1910 in Włocławek. Ultimately, he did not serve even half of the sentence. He left prison at the end of June of the same year. The conditions of solitary confinement were not too severe. As he wrote shortly after his release to Zygmunt Wasilewski: "In my body, because good hygiene with daily wood chopping, gymnastics, rhythmical breathing etc. made me feel as if I had left a sanatorium; in my mind, because I wrote half of a decent scientific dissertation entitled "Social psychology of cognition. On my mind, because I have written half of a decent scientific dissertation entitled "Social psychology of cognition. A theory of utility and value". This dissertation appeared in print in 1912 as "Social Psychology. Acts of Cognition".

In October 1913, Balicki left for Petersburg as a correspondent of the "Warsaw Newspaper". He arrived in the Russian capital alone. At that time he was already separated from his wife, Gabriela Balicka (a member of "Zet" and "National League"). He came to the city at the Neva River with impaired health. Despite his physical activity (Balicki was, among other things, a member of the Warsaw Rowing Society), his exhaustion with political activity and coronary heart disease were becoming increasingly evident.

The outbreak of the Great War found Balicki by the Neva. On 25 November 1914, he became a member of the Polish National Committee (KNP) established in Warsaw and then transferred to Petrograd under the leadership of Roman Dmowski. He published in the pages of "Sprawa Polska" ("Polish Issue") - a weekly founded by Dmowski, the press organ of the KNP.

The last political initiative in which Balicki got involved was his idea to create Polish military formations attached to the Russian army. Dmowski was much more sceptical in this matter, doubting the independence of such units (should they be created), and therefore seeing little political benefit for the Polish cause in this undertaking.

Ultimately, however, the KNP favoured Balicki's concept. In January 1915, the Organizing Committee of the Polish Legions was set up under the auspices of the KNP. Balicki joined it as head of the recruitment section. It was assumed that between 200,000 and 300,000 volunteers would join the ranks of the Legions. Less than a thousand joined (the so-called Puławski Legion, consisting of 900 soldiers). Not only was there a lack of enthusiasm for the idea among Poles, but also the actual sabotaging of the entire campaign by the Russian authorities played its (negative) role. This failure was certainly a great blow to Balicki as the author of the whole concept and head of the recruitment section at the Polish Legions' Organising Committee. It also contributed to a weakening of his position in the national democratic camp itself.

After Dmowski's departure from Russia in November 1915, Balicki - as it might have seemed - was the natural leader of National Democracy in Russia. However, this did not happen.

At the beginning of 1916, Balicki's closest associates noticed his deteriorating mood and apathy, which manifested itself in his shying away from political activity. This was undoubtedly caused by the combination of several factors: problems in his personal life (separation from his wife), growing coronary heart disease and the failure of the idea of forming Polish Legions in Russia.

Balicki died in Petrograd on 12 September 1916. Three days later he was buried in the crypt of the Catholic Church of the Ascension, which stood in one of the town's Catholic cemeteries. In 1920, the Bolshevik authorities ordered that all coffins be removed from the church to be destroyed, and the bodies buried in them were placed (or rather dumped) in a mass grave in the Uspensky Orthodox cemetery.

== Works ==
- Hedonizm jako punkt wyjścia etyki (1900)
- Egoizm narodowy wobec etyki (National Egoism and Ethics) (1903)
- Metody nauk społecznych i ich rozwój w XIX stuleciu (1903)
- Parlamentaryzm : zarys socylologiczny Vol 1–2 (1900, 1906)
- Psychologia społeczna : czynności poznawania (1912)
- Z doby przełomu myśli narodowej (1916)
