= Gabriela Balicka-Iwanowska =

Polish botanist, activist and legislator

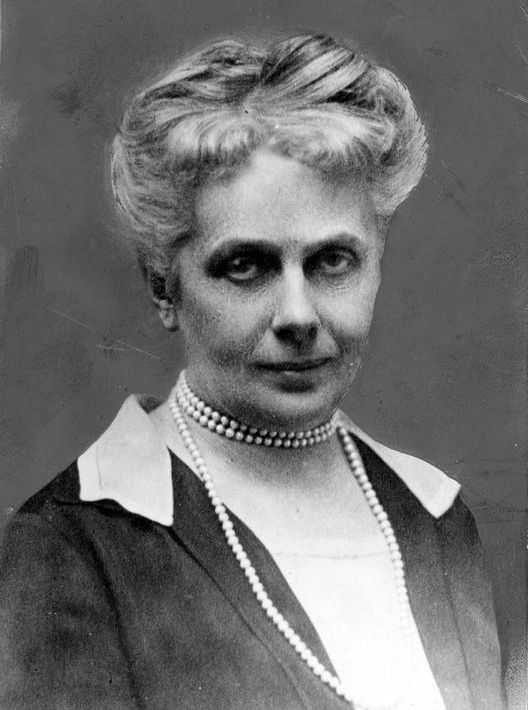
- Born: Gabriela Iwanowska; 16 May 1871; Warsaw, Poland
- Died: 19 February 1962 (aged 90); Kraków, Poland
- Burial place: Rakowicki Cemetery
- Education: University of Geneva
- Occupations: Botanist, activist, legislator
- Spouse: Zygmunt Balicki
- Parents: Antoni Iwanowski (father); Sybilla Rosenwerth (mother)

Gabriela Balicka-Iwanowska (16 May 1871 – 19 February 1962) was a Polish botanist, activist and legislator.

== Biography ==
Gabriela Iwanowska was born on 16 May 1867, in Warsaw, Poland, the third daughter of Antoni Iwanowski, a government official, and Sybilla Rosenwerth who hailed from a family of landowners. However, her mother died when Iwanowska was a young child, in 1874, and her father died only ten years later, leaving Iwanowska and her sisters orphaned but well-off members of Warsaw's social elite.

In 1889, Iwanowska travelled to Switzerland to begin her studies at the Faculty of Life Sciences at the University of Geneva, graduating with her bachelor's degree in natural sciences in 1890.

In 1891 she married Polish activist and sociologist Zygmunt Balicki, however, according to Luksa, "Zygmunt Balicki made his decision for marriage due to external coercion — he ensured the wedding with Gabriela would give him the financial stability he needed so badly."

=== Researcher ===
In 1893, Gabriela Balicka completed her botany studies at the University of Geneva, obtaining her Ph.D. in natural sciences with the dissertation Contribution a l'étude anatomique et systématique du genre Iris et des genres voisins, written under the direction of Robert Hippolyte Chodat. By doing so, she became one of the first Polish women to earn a university education. Her botanical research focused on the plant taxonomy of Iris, Tremandraceae and marine algae.

Remaining in Geneva after graduation, she went to work in a plant physiology laboratory. In 1896, the couple settled in Munich, where Gabriel continued her scientific activities under the guidance of the German botanist – Karl von Goebl. In 1898, she and her husband moved to Dębniki near Kraków to care for Gabriela's orphaned niece, Janina Kossobudzka.

In the years 1898–1906, Balicka collaborated with the botany professor Emil Godlewski (senior), at Jagiellonian University and published research in the field of anatomy, cytology and physiology.

During World War I, she remained in Warsaw becoming involved in the work of the Polish Red Cross. By this time she was separated from her husband; he died in 1916.

=== Legislator ===
After the end of the war, Poland regained its independence and Balicka took up a political career. According to the national decree of 28 November 1918, women were granted active and passive voting rights if they were older than 21. Deciding to run for office, Balicka aimed to be elected to the country's primary legislative body. Balicka's name was recognizable among voters and she was elected as a deputy in the Legislative Sejm (1919–1922) and in the Sejm I (1922–1927), Sejm II (1928–1930) and Sejm III (1930–1935). She also became the leading activist of the National Women's Organization.

In the Legislative Sejm, Balicka was mainly involved in the fight to lift restrictions on women's civil rights.

=== Last years ===
Balicka withdrew from politics after 1935. During the German occupation she lived in Górka Narodowa near Kraków. She died there 19 February 1962 and was buried in the historic Rakowicki Cemetery, near the center of Kraków.

== Selected publications ==
- Balicka-Iwanowska, Gabriela. Contribution à l'étude anatomique et systématique du genre Iris et des genres voisins . (dissertation) Impr. Aubert-Schuchardt, 1893.
- Chodat, Robert, and Gabriela Balicka-Iwanowska. Remarques sur la structure des Tremandracées. Romet, 1893.
- Balicka-Iwanowska, Gabriele. "Die Morphologie des Thelygonum cynocrambe." Flora 83 (1897): 357-366.
- Balicka-Iwanowska, Gabrielle. "Contribution à l'étude du sac embryonnaire chez certain Gamopetales." Flora 86 (1899): 47-71.
- Balicka-Iwanowska, Gabrielle. Recherches sur la décomposition et la régénération des corps albuminoides dans les plantes. 1903.
- Balicka-Iwanowska, Gabrielle. Contribution à l'étude du rôle physiologique de l'acide phosphorique dans la nutrition des plantes. 1906.
