= Church of the Nativity of the Blessed Virgin Mary, Warsaw =

Church of the Nativity of the Blessed Virgin Mary
- Kościół Narodzenia Najświętszej Maryi Panny w Warszawie
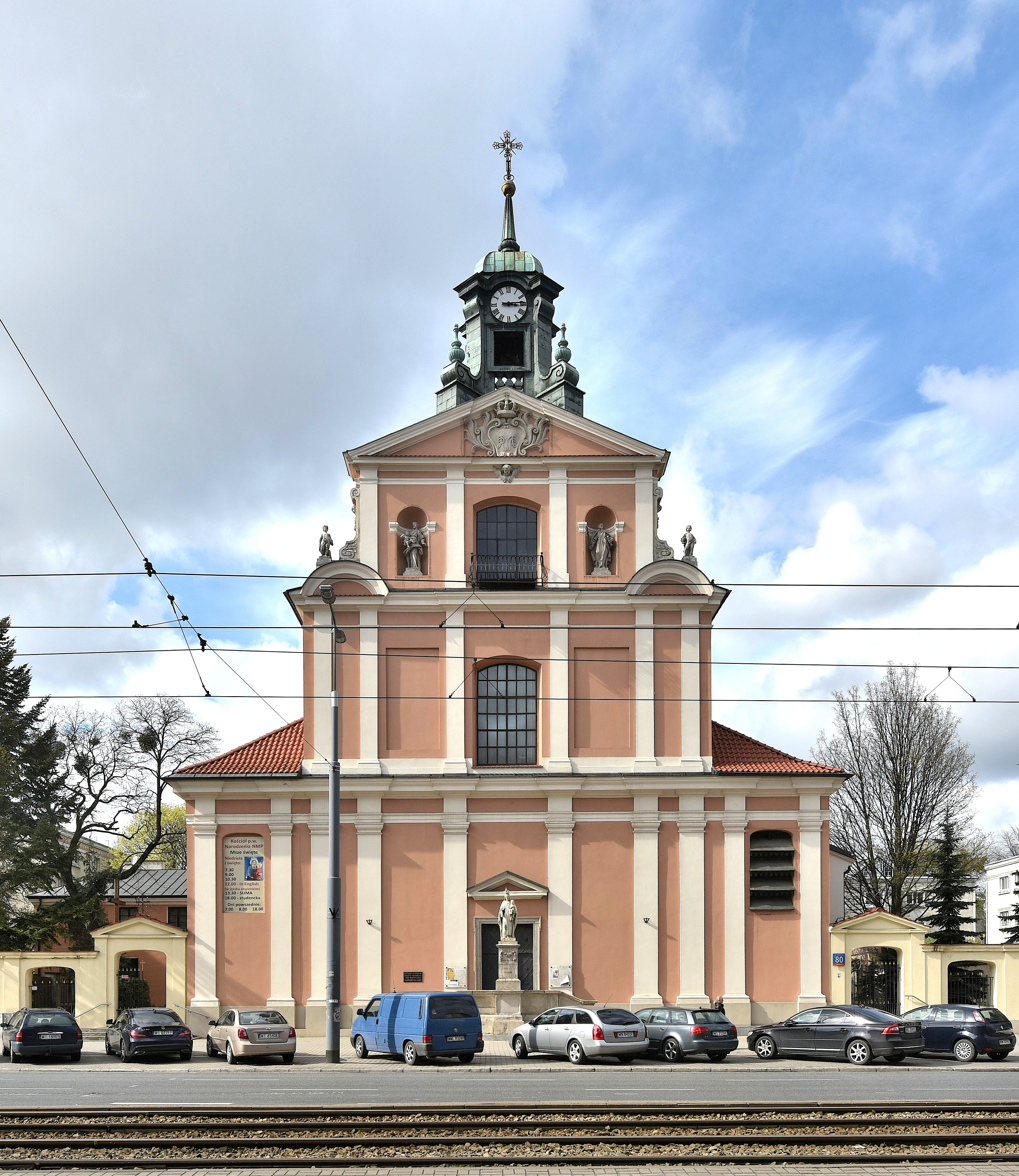
- Church of the Nativity of the Blessed Virgin Mary.
- Church of the Nativity of the Blessed Virgin Mary
- 52.242778°N 20.995000°E
- Location: Warsaw
- Country: Poland
- Denomination: Roman Catholic

Architecture
- Architect: Augustyn Wincenty Locci Jr
- Groundbreaking: 1682
- Completed: 1732

Administration
- Archdiocese: Warsaw

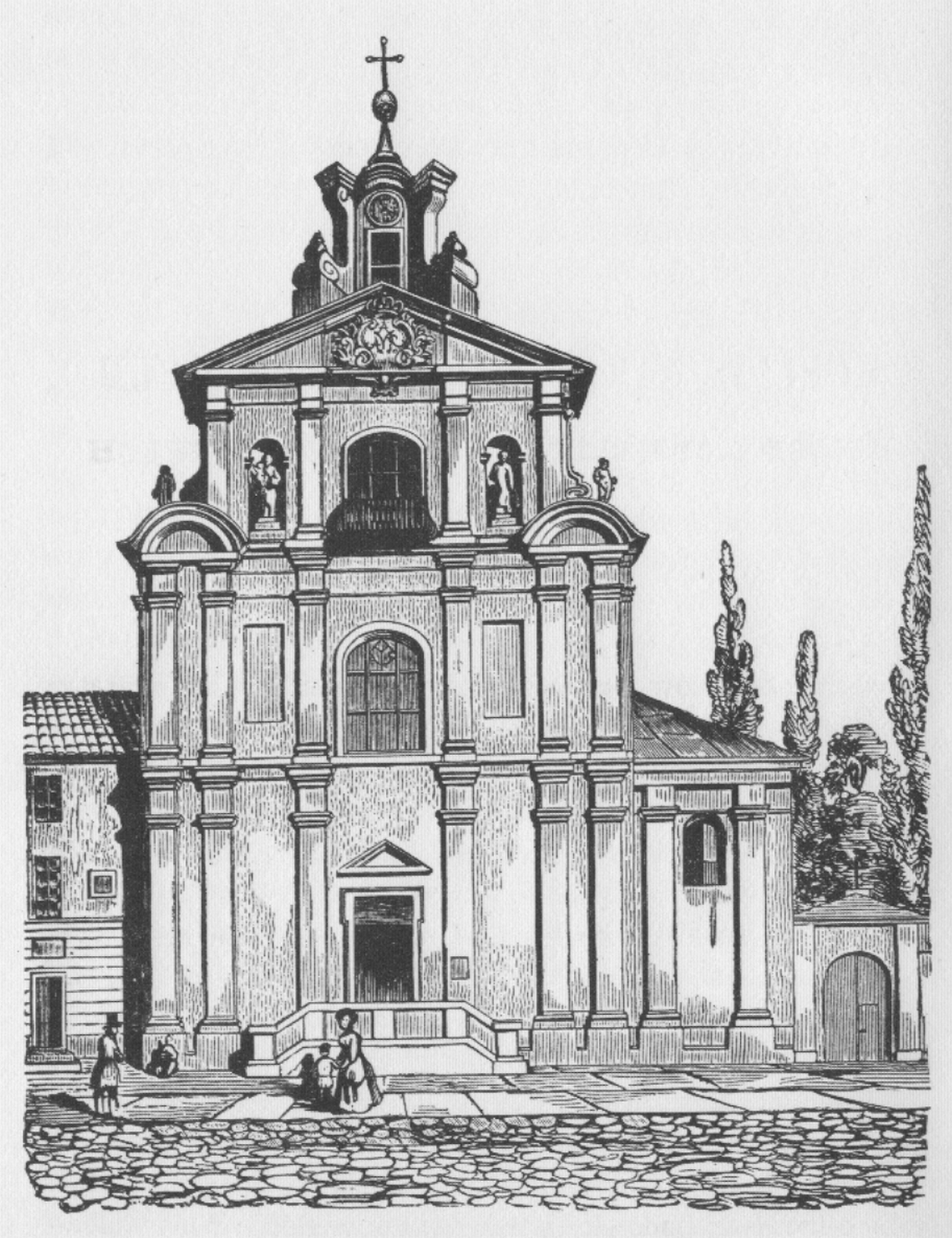
Michał Starkman's woodcut from around 1855

The Church of the Nativity of the Blessed Virgin Mary is a Roman Catholic church located at 80 Solidarności Avenue (formerly 32 Leszno Street) in Warsaw.

== History of the church ==
The church was built from 1682 to 1732 as a church adjacent to a Carmelite convent.

The Polish-Lithuanian Provincial, of the Carmelite Order, Fr. Marcin Charzewicz, through Fr. Dr. Marcin Behma, the theology notary of the General provinces, purchased the land for 2,000 złoty from Col. Jan Weretycki and his wife's estate in the town of Leszno near Warsaw. The Bishop of Poznań, Stefan Wierzbowski, in a letter on September 2, 1682 to the Provincial Order of Carmelites allowed them to raise a cross and celebrate Mass, which was tantamount to permission to build a church and monastery. Permission to build was also expressed by the Leszczyńscy brothers, owners of Leszno: Bogusław Leszczyński - abbot and rector of Płock and Raphael – father of the future king Stanisław Leszczyński.

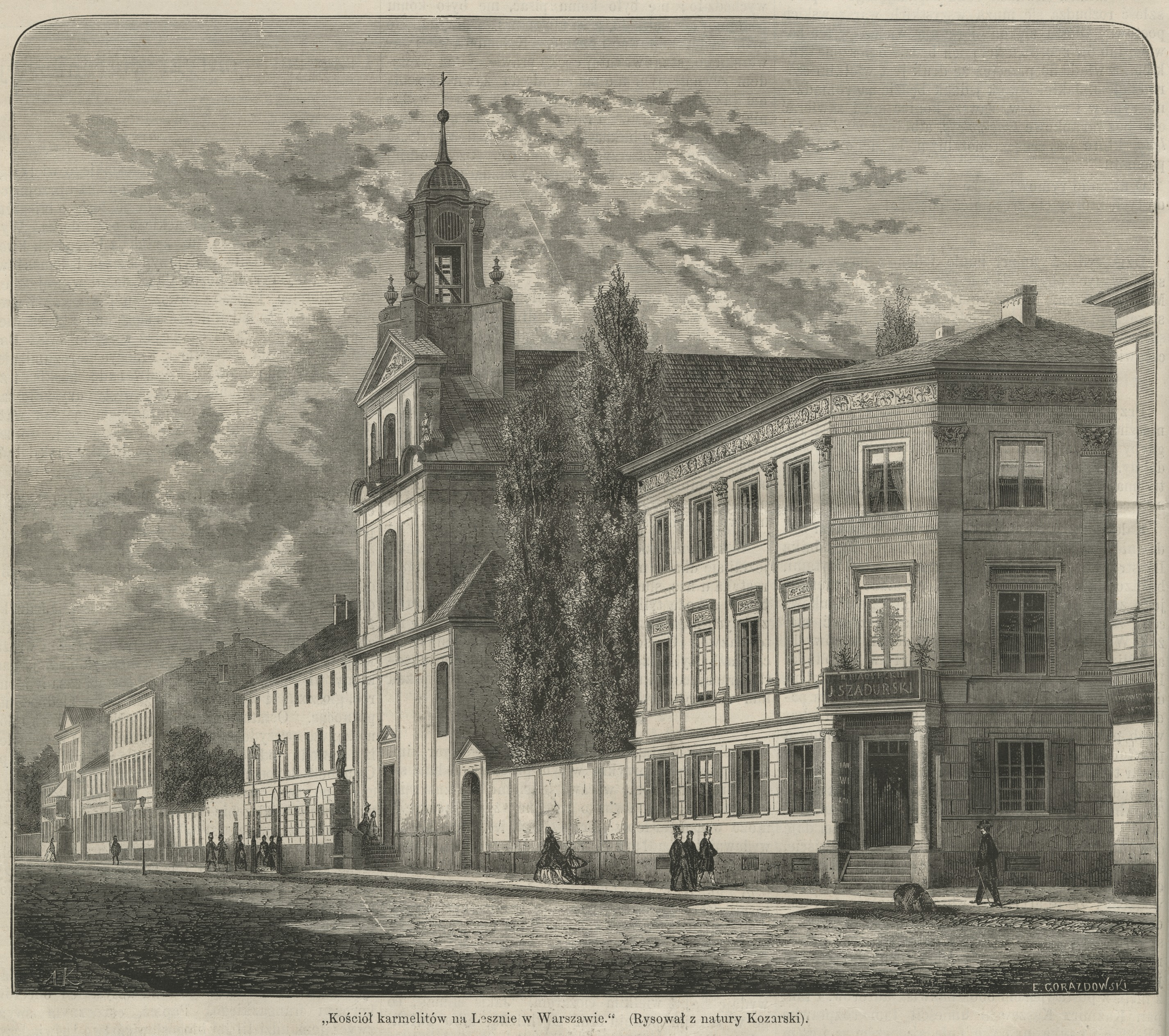
Church and its surroundings in 1866

The first service was held on September 8, 1682 in the chapel decorated with: "the miraculous icon of the silver framework, the author unknown and depicting the Mother of God". This image was then placed in the main altar of the church.

The church was dedicated on April 27, 1732 by the papal legate in Poland, Camillo Paolucci. Four side altars were devoted to saints: Joseph, Adalbert, Elijah and Magdalena de Pazzi. Images for these altars were painted by Szymon Czechowicz.

During the Great Northern War the monastery was occupied by the Swedes.

It was restored in 1853, when a chapel and clock tower were built. The cost of the restoration was more than 22,000 złoty, some of which was contributed by the government.

During World War II, it was one of two active churches within the ghetto (the other was All Saints Church). During that time the church was run by priest Puder, who aided many Jews, facilitating the construction of a tunnel leading outside the ghetto under the church. After the war, it was rebuilt between 1951 and 1956. The monastery buildings were rebuilt.

In the church hangs a copy of an image of Our Lady of Byalynichy, the original hangs in a castle at Lyakhavichy.

In connection with the construction of the through Warsaw W-Z Route' and the widening of Leszno Street (at the time called Gen. K. Świerczewskiego Avenue), on the night of November 30 to December 1, 1962, the church was moved back 21 meters.

In 1968 an organ was added. From 1984 to 1985 the church parsonage was built. In 2009 the facade underwent a partial renovation. During the renovation, baroque colors were restored to the front of the church.

On April 4, 2012 an antique, baroque dress of the Mother of God (which had even survived the Warsaw Uprising) was stolen, and the next day a painting of Our Lady of Perpetual Help was stolen as well.

== History of the monastery ==
The monastery was built at the same time as the church. In 1786, Fr. Marek Jandołowicz stayed at the monastery. In 1818 it was partly taken over by the authorities to be used as a prison. In 1822 inmates included Walerian Łukasiński and other members of the Patriotic Society as well as Ignacy Prądzyński and Piotr Wysocki.

The building suffered during World War II, but although initially secured, in 1962 it was demolished to accommodate the widening of the road aleja Gen. K. Świerczewskiego (now aleja Solidarności).
