= Próżna Street, Warsaw =

Street in Warsaw, Poland

Coordinates: 52.2365°N 21.0054°E

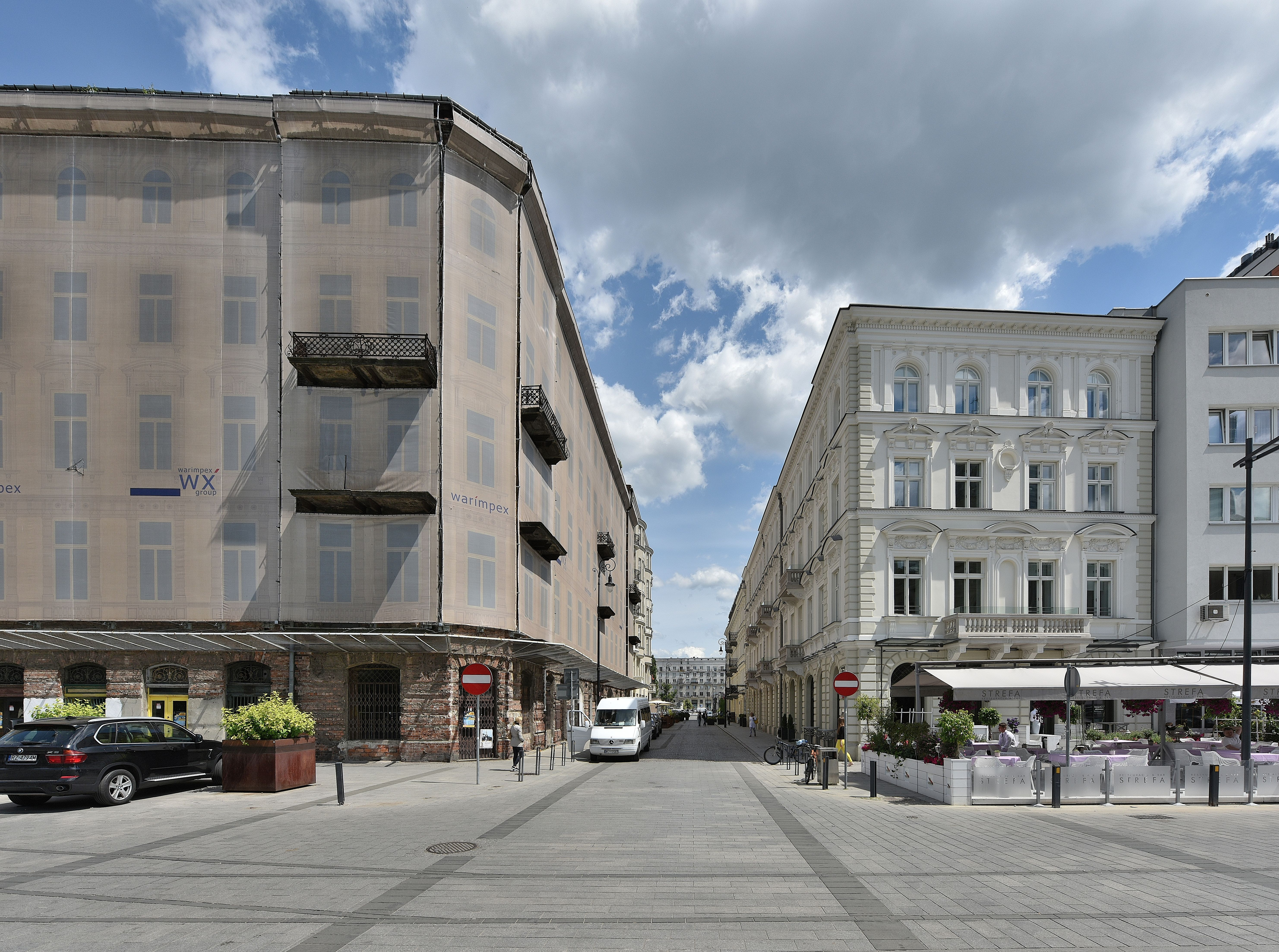
Próżna Street viewed from Grzybowski Square (2016)

Ulica Próżna (lit. Vain Street) is a historical street in the Śródmieście Północne neighbourhood of the borough of Śródmieście in Warsaw, Poland. It is the only former Warsaw Ghetto street still featuring as many as four tenement houses.

The street is one of the few fragments of "Jewish Warsaw" in which the climate of the old Jewish quarter is revived during the Festival of Jewish Culture – Singer's Warsaw. The festival has been held annually every September in Próżna Street and Grzybowski Square since 2004.

In 2011−2013 buildings at number 7 and 9 underwent extensive renovations and have become office space. The Austrian Cultural Forum is located on number 7.

The landmark PAST Tower, which was also a symbol of the Polish resistance, is right around the corner of the street.
