= Emil von Dungern =

German internist (1867-1961)

- Born: 26 November 1867; Würzburg, Bavaria
- Died: 4 September 1961 (aged 93); Ludwigshafen am Bodensee, West Germany

Baron Emil von Dungern (26 November 1867 – 4 September 1961) was a German internist. He was born in Würzburg and died in Bodman-Ludwigshafen.

Von Dungern worked at the Heidelberg Institute for Experimental Cancer Research where he was the director of the scientific section. Ludwik Hirszfeld, the co-discoverer of the heritability of ABO blood groups, was his research assistant from 1907 to 1911. Hirszfeld, in his work Historia (1967), described von Dungern as "a spiritual poet who had to fall in love with a problem in order to be able to work on it ... He was a flame burning from within." (Note: Mazumdar (2002) states that "many passages in Hirszfeld's work sound like blood grouping through the eyes of Goethe's Werther")
