= Grzybów Square =

Square in Warsaw

Coordinates: 52°14′9.93″N 21°0′11.93″E

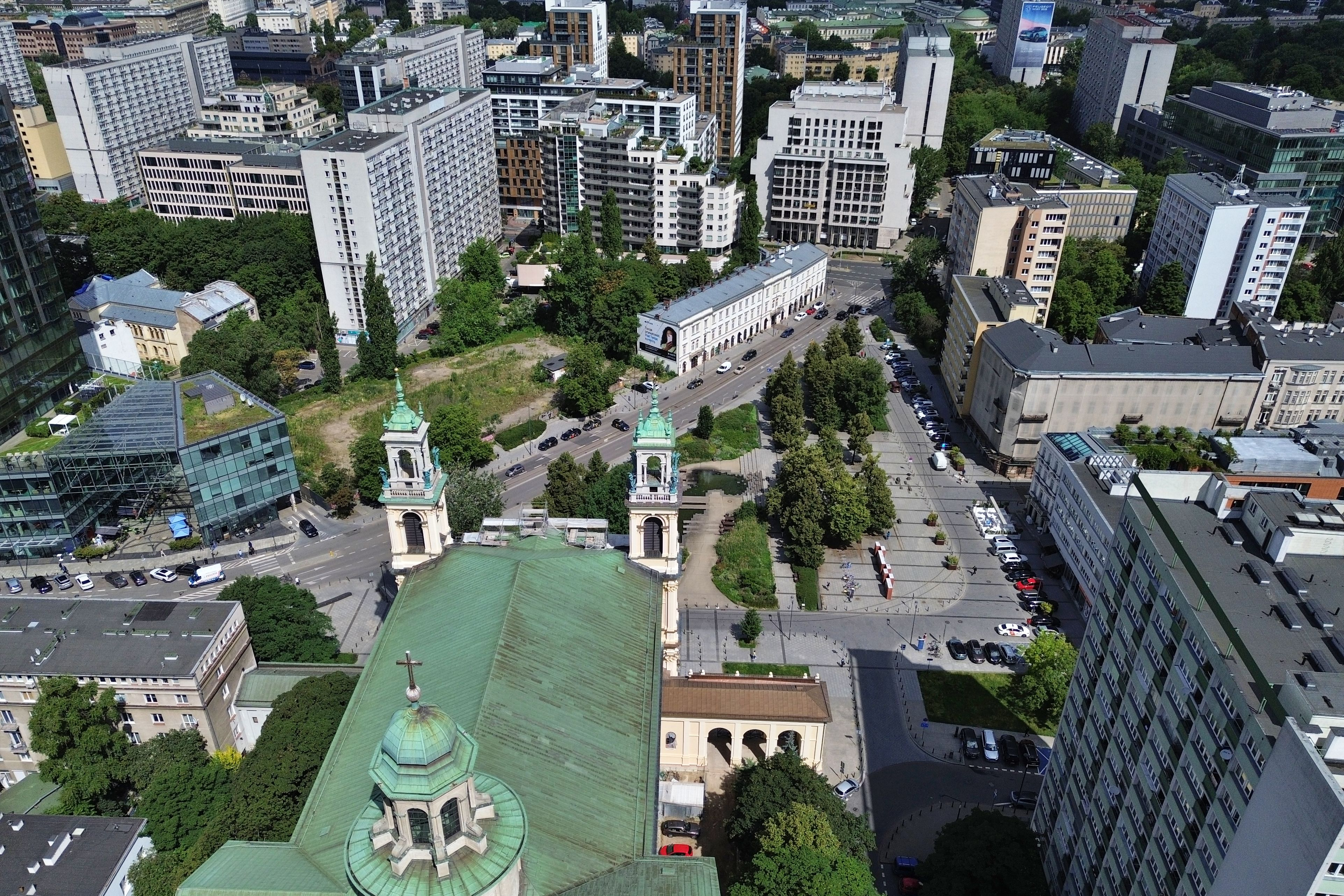
General view of Grzybowski (Grzybów) Square, 2024

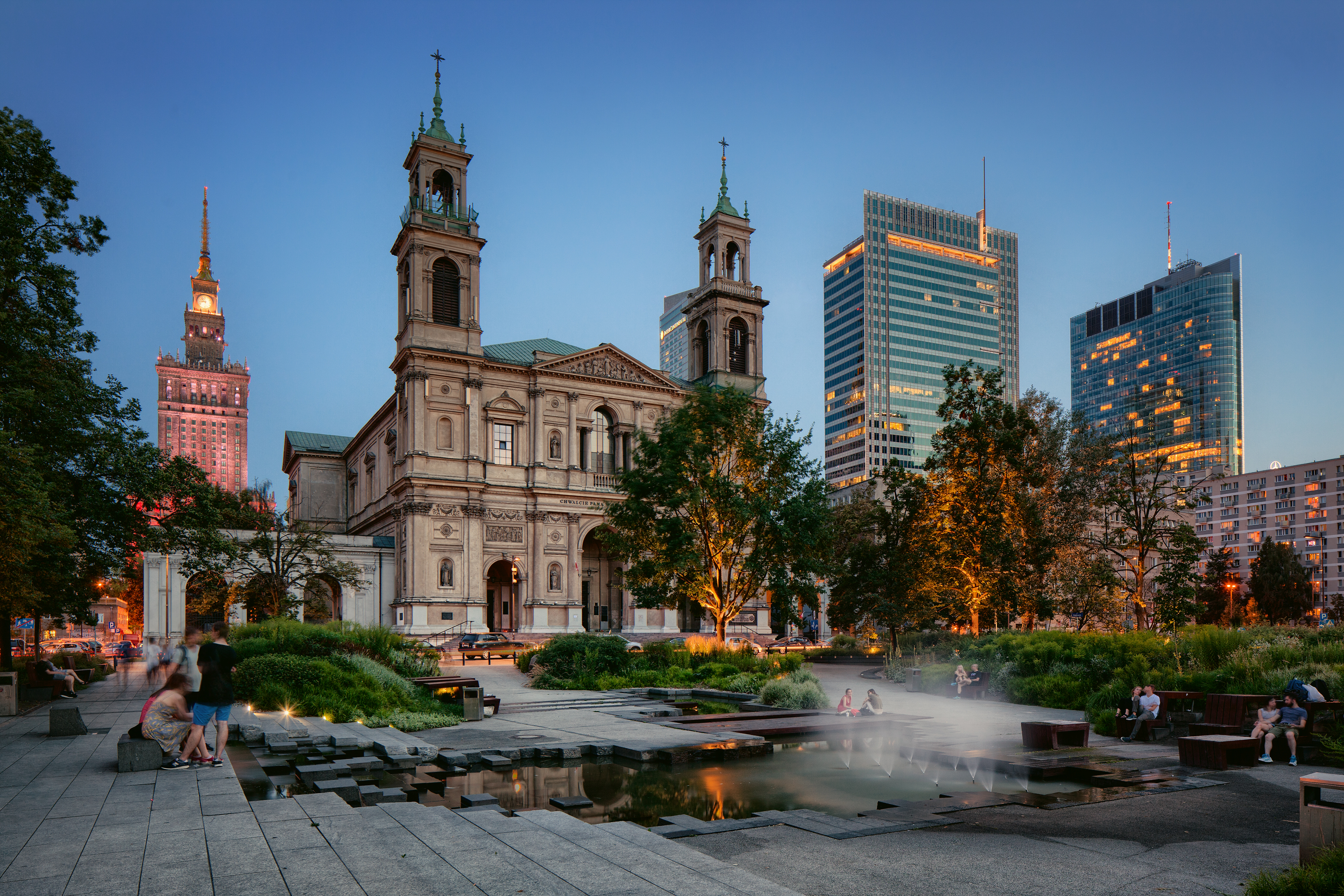
Nightview of the southern section and skyscrapers

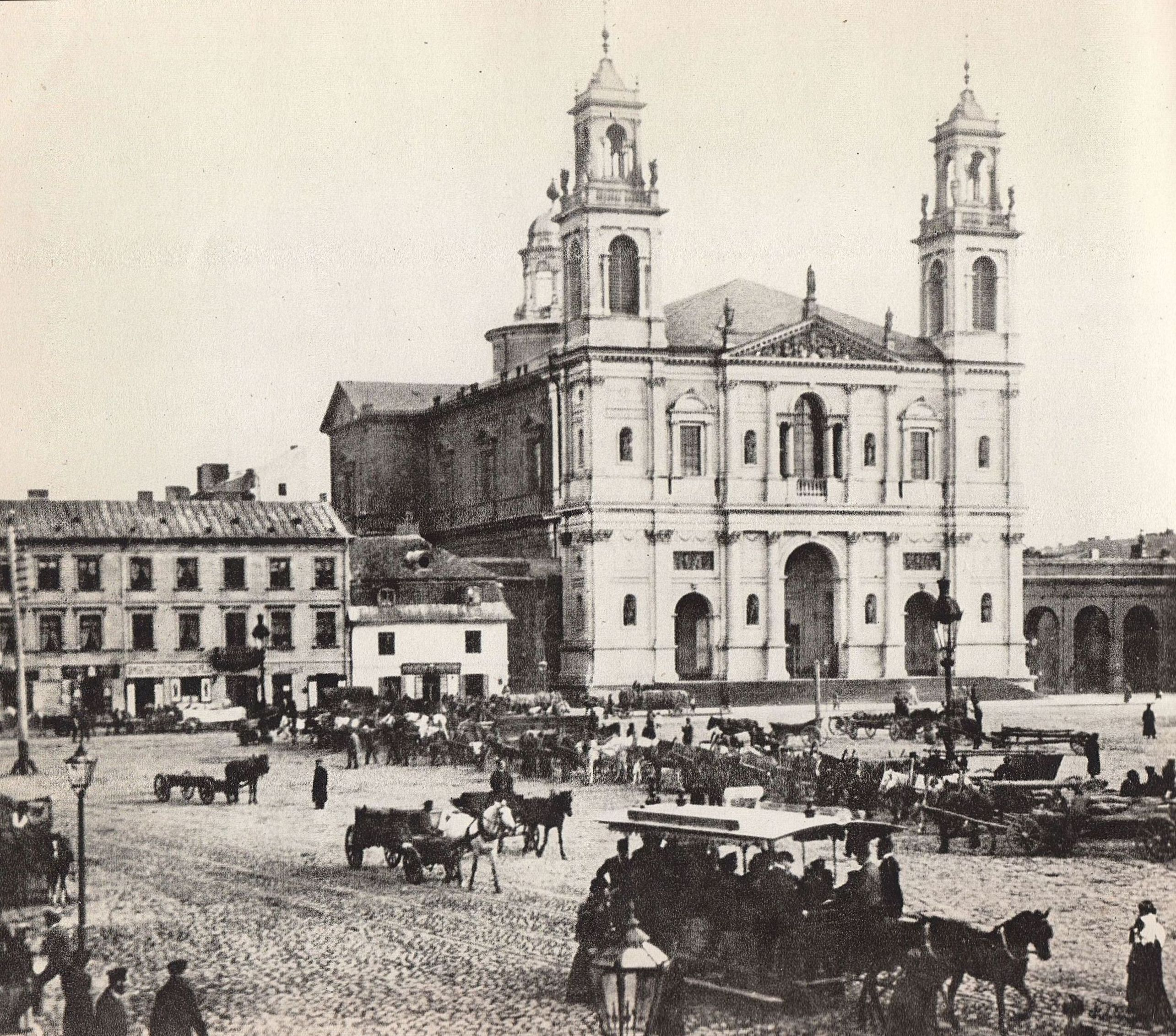
Grzybowski Square with the All Saints' Church in the late 19th century

Grzybów Square, Grzybowski Square (Polish: Plac Grzybowski, pronounced [ˈplat͡s ɡʐɘˈbɔf.ski]) is a triangular square in the Śródmieście (downtown) district of Warsaw, Poland, between Twarda, Bagno, Grzybowska and Królewska streets.

== History ==
=== 17th to 20th centuries ===
The square's history goes back to the early 17th century, when it was an undeveloped space at a crossroads leading to Ujazdów Castle, the village of Służewiec and the Old Town. From the mid-17th century, it became the market square, then assumed Jurydyka status named Grzybów after the owner, Jan Grzybowski. From 1786 to 1787, a town hall designed by Karol Schütz was built on the site. In 1791, it became part of the Warsaw area.

The town hall building housed a prison from 1809 to 1830. After its demolition, a grain market was created at the site, which ran until the end of the 19th century. Also from 1815, the square was gradually built up in neoclassical style, with some of its buildings designed by famous architects such as Antonio Corazzi and Fryderyk Albert Lessel. Overlooking the square, the streets also took on a uniform, neoclassical appearance, and from 1830 the market was called Grzybowski.

On 29 October 1863, during the January uprising, the Russians executed several insurgents in the square: Franciszek Trzaska, Górski, Filkiewicz, and Chojnacki. During this period, Jewish people lived in the area, and it was famous for its many small shops offering articles of ironwork.

From 1866, there was a loop line running through the square to Warsaw, which were replaced by double decker buses in 1880, then horse trams, and after 1908, electric trams. Even earlier, in 1855, the new Warsaw aqueduct, built and designed by Henryk Marconi, went through the square. Electric lighting came to the square in 1907. In 1897, the market was moved out to Witkowski Square (which no longer exists), and the square was paved in cobblestones. The interwar period brought no significant changes.

On 13 November 1904, there was a demonstration against mobilization during the Russo-Japanese War. During the demonstration, there was a clash between Combat Organization of the Polish Socialist Party and police, which was the first armed attack of the Combat Organisation. Ten people were murdered, forty-three were injured, and over a hundred were arrested.

=== World War II ===
During the Siege of Warsaw in 1939, bombs and missiles fell on the square and the surrounding area. Some houses were destroyed and had to be demolished in 1940.

In November 1940, Grzybowski Square was part of the Warsaw Ghetto, and a wall separated the area from the non-Jewish side. In March 1941, the area of the ghetto was reduced by setting its border along the eastern side of the square. After the liquidation of the ghetto, in August 1942, the "small ghetto" was closed and the area became available to the rest of Warsaw's population.

During heavy fighting in the Warsaw Uprising in 1944, two houses and a church were partially damaged, and after the collapse of the uprising, the Germans burned the western side of the square and also destroyed the Arona Serdynera Synagogue.

=== The present ===
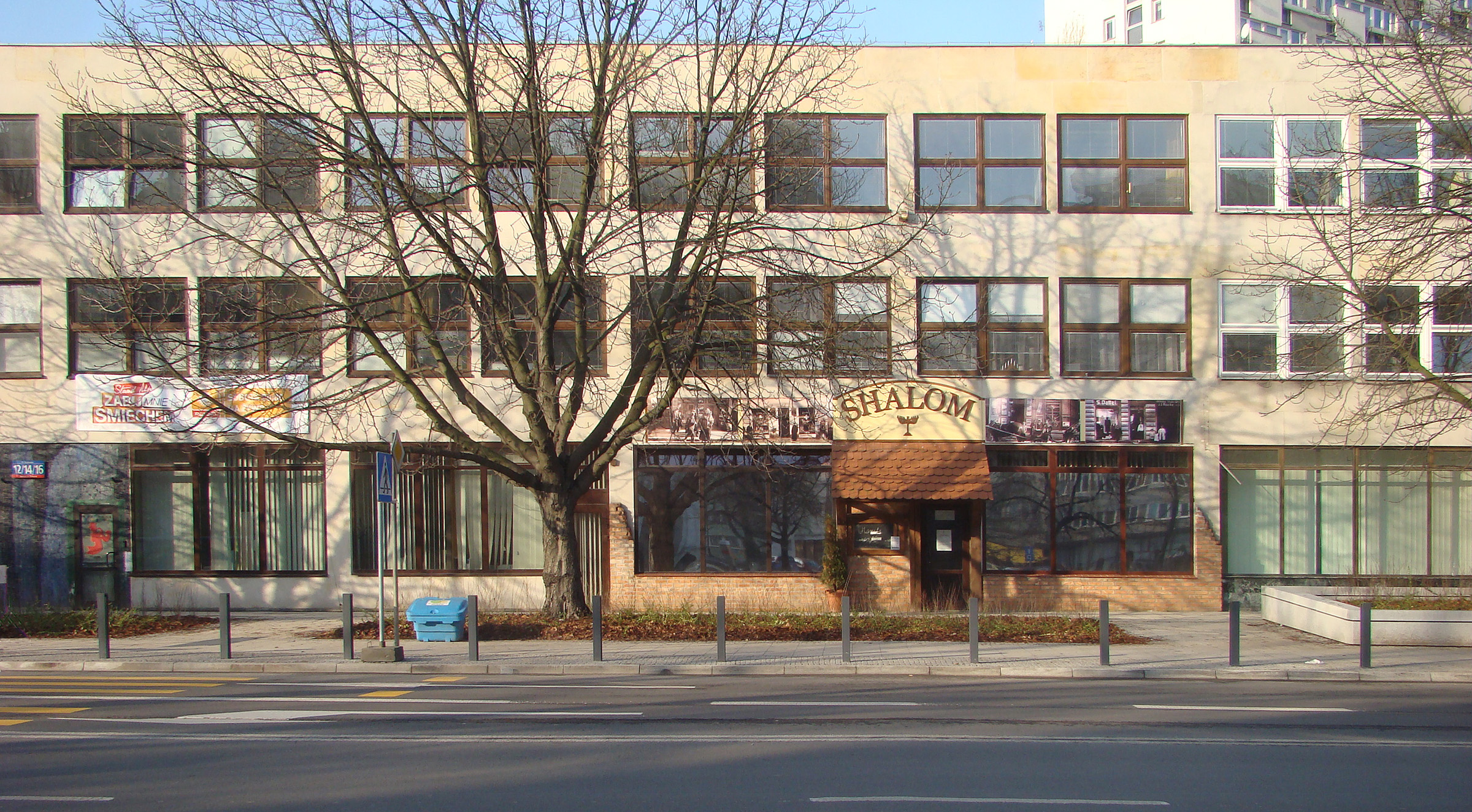
The new Jewish Theatre

Despite post-war reconstruction plans for only a partial reconstruction of the church and for a great realist market, many houses and buildings were demolished, and only Próżna Street exists from the old ghetto. The church was rebuilt, and from 1966 to 1967, a new post-modern Jewish Theatre building, designed by Bohdan Pniewski, was built. The synagogue was not rebuilt, and in its place is the 44-storey Cosmopolitan Twarda 2/4 apartment building. There is also a monument to the Polish underground in the center of the square.

The tram lines no longer exist, but in a restoration of Grzybowski Square from 2009 to 2011, a reminder of their tracks still shows.

A monument commemorating Poles who saved Jews during World War II is expected to be built by 2015. The monument, designed by Piotr Musialowski, Paulina Pankiewicz and Michał Adamczyk will be funded by the state and the city.

== See also ==
- Marceli Godlewski
