= Turczyn, Grajewo County =

Turczyn
- Village
- Location within Poland
- Coordinates: 53°42′N 22°36′E
- Country: Poland
- Voivodeship: Podlaskie
- County: Grajewo
- Gmina: Rajgród
- Population: 74

Turczyn [ˈturt͡ʂɨn] is a village in the administrative district of Gmina Rajgród, within Grajewo County, Podlaskie Voivodeship, in north-eastern Poland. As of 2019, it had a population of 74 people.

== Notable people ==
- Marceli Godlewski (1865 - 1945) - Polish priest
