= Marek Godlewski =

Polish footballer

Personal information
- Date of birth: 28 April 1965 (age 61)
- Place of birth: Słupsk, Poland
- Height: 1.86 m (6 ft 1 in)
- Position: Defender

Senior career*
Years	Team	Apps	(Gls)
1986-1986	Gryf Słupsk		
1986–1991	Zagłębie Lubin	103+	(10+)
1991	Galatasaray	0	(0)
1991	Sokół Pniewy		
1992–1993	Widzew Łódź	52	(3)
1994–1996	SV Lurup	52	(5)
1996–1998	TuS Lingen		
1998	Pogoń Lębork		
2000	Słupia Słupsk		
2001–2002	Słupia Kobylnica		
2003	Wybrzeże Objazda		

International career
1989–1990	Poland	3	(0)
- * Club domestic league appearances and goals

Marek Godlewski (born 28 April 1965) is a Polish former professional footballer who played as a defender

== Career ==
In 1986, at the age of 21, Godlewski signed for Zagłębie Lubin in the Polish top flight from lower league side Gryf Słupsk.

In 1991, he signed for Galatasaray, Turkey's most successful club, failing to make a league appearance there before returning to Poland to join Sokół Pniewy.

After playing for German lower league outfit SV Lurup, he played for Pogoń Lębork, MKS Słupia Słupsk, KS Słupia Kobylnica, and Wybrzeże Objazda in the Polish lower leagues

== Honours ==
Zagłębie Lubin

- Ekstraklasa: 1990–91
