= Stefan Godlewski =

Polish poet and novelist

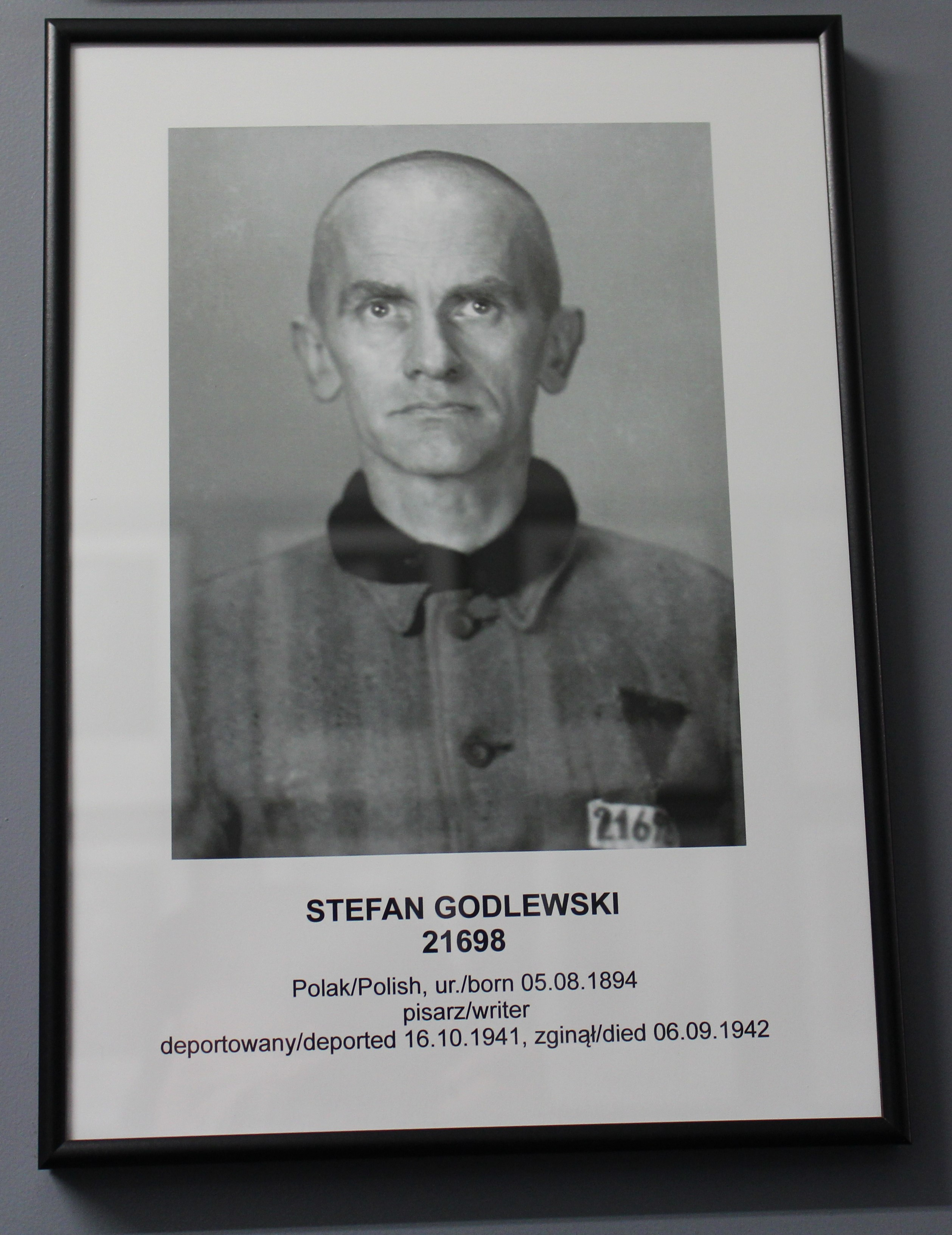
- Prisoner portrait of Stefan Godlewski in the Auschwitz Museum
- Born: 5 August 1894; Warsaw, Poland
- Died: 6 September 1942 (aged 48); Auschwitz
- Occupations: Poet and novelist

Stefan Józef Godlewski (5 August 1894 in Warsaw – 6 September 1942 in Auschwitz) was a Polish poet and novelist.

He was imprisoned and died in the German concentration camp Auschwitz.

A court testimony on 22 March 1947 by Auschwitz prisoner and member of the Sonderkommando, Aleksander Górecki, sheds light on the reason for the imprisonment of Godlewski, as well as his passage through the Prisoners Hospital block 20 in Auschwitz:

I saw a Warsaw writer among them, Stefan Godlewski. He knew he was going to be released from the camp. When he saw me, he asked for rescue. He had been sent to the camp because some conspiracy activist had run into his apartment while escaping, burst out onto the balcony, jumped out onto a tree and fled. But Godlewski was sent to Auschwitz by the Gestapo. The family was making efforts, however, and he was to be released. But people who were extremely exhausted, beaten or ill wouldn’t be released - they’d be put in quarantine until they got better. Stefan Godlewski fell ill with typhoid. He was moved to the typhoid block. He was emaciated, he couldn’t walk, he just crawled, begging to do anything to save him from the gas chamber. I turned to Dr. Entress, a graduate of Poznań University, a man brought up on Polish bread, who was doing quite well in Poland, to ask for help. Entress replied that he had to follow the list and told me to mind my own business.
