= Ludwik Hirszfeld =

Polish microbiologist and serologist

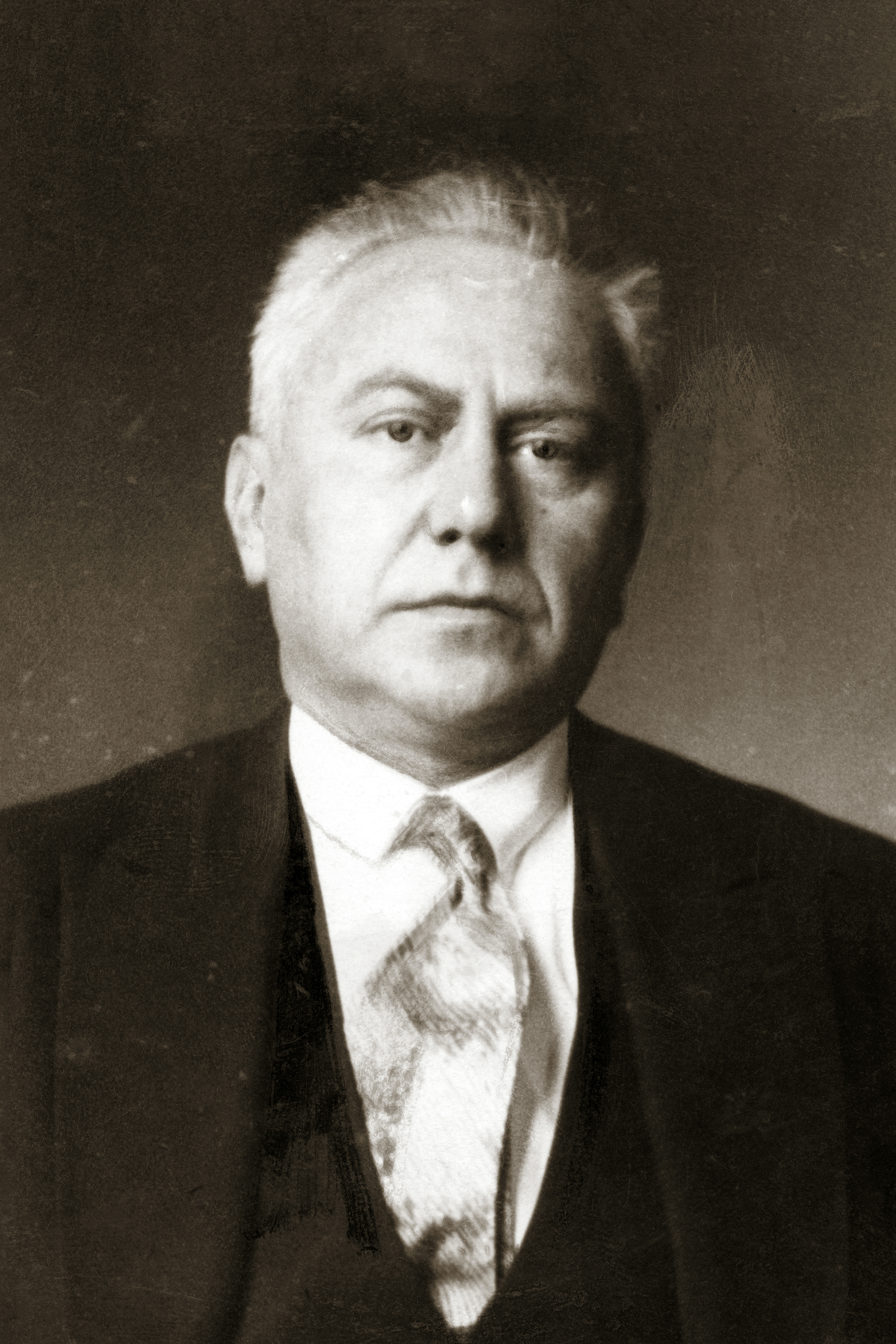
- Ludwik Hirszfeld, microbiologist and serologist
- Born: 5 August 1884; Warsaw, Congress Poland
- Died: 7 March 1954 (aged 69); Wrocław, Polish People's Republic
- Known for: discovered of the inheritance of ABO blood type
- Scientific career
- Fields: Microbiology, Serology

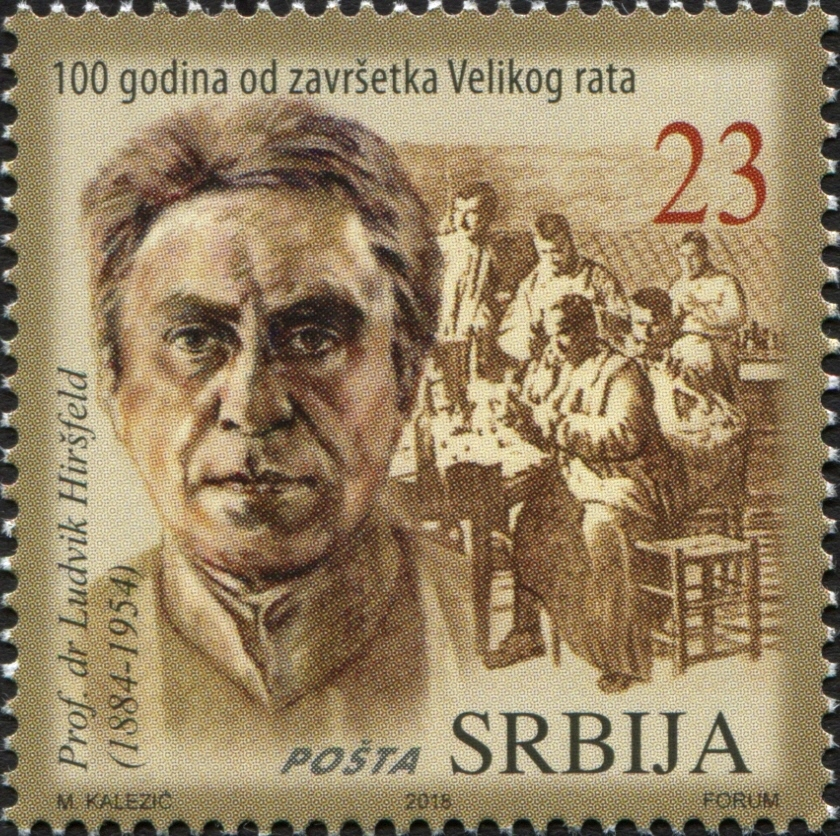
Hirszfeld as depicted on a 2018 stamp of Serbia

Ludwik Hirszfeld (Polish pronunciation: [ˈludvik xirʂfelt]; 5 August 1884 – 7 March 1954) was a Polish microbiologist and serologist. He is considered a co-discoverer of the inheritance of ABO blood types.

== Life ==
He was a cousin of Aleksander Rajchman, a Polish mathematician, and of Ludwik Rajchman, a Polish bacteriologist.

He was born into a Jewish family in Łódź and studied medicine in Germany. In 1902 he entered the University of Würzburg and transferred in 1904 to Berlin, where he attended lectures in medicine and philosophy. Hirszfeld completed his doctoral dissertation, "Über Blutagglutination," in 1907, thus taking the first step in what was to become his specialty. But first he became a junior assistant in cancer research at the Heidelberg Institute for Experimental Cancer Research, where E. von Dungern was his department head. Hirszfeld soon formed a close personal friendship with Dungern which proved to be scientifically fruitful. At Heidelberg they did the first joint work on animal and human blood groups which, in 1900, had been identified as isoagglutinins by Karl Landsteiner. Von Dungern and Hirszfeld examined 348 individuals from 72 families and showed that blood groups A and B did not occur in the offspring unless they were present in at least one of the parents, fulfilling the Mendelian principles of inheritance. They also showed that A and B are dominant, while O is a recessive trait. In addition, they came up with the names A, B and O for these blood groups, which have been used since. One year later, they showed that agglutination of A red blood cells can be strong or weak, and proposed two subtypes, named A1 and A2.

Hirszfeld gradually found the working conditions at Heidelberg too confining and to familiarize himself with the entire field of hygiene and microbiology, in 1911 he accepted an assistantship at the Hygiene Institute of the University of Zurich, just after he had married. His wife Hanka (1884–1964, born Hanna Kasman), also a physician, became an assistant at the Zurich Children's Clinic under Emil Feer.

In 1914 Hirszfeld was made an academic lecturer on the basis of his work on anaphylaxis and anaphylatoxin and their relationships to coagulation; he was also named "Privatdozent." When World War I broke out, Serbia was devastated by epidemics of typhus and bacillary dysentery. In 1915 Hirszfeld applied for duty there. He remained with the Serbian army until the end of the war, serving as serological and bacteriological adviser. At this time, in the hospital for contagious diseases in Thessaloniki he discovered the bacillus "Salmonella paratyphi" C, today called "Salmonella hirszfeldi."

As a physician in the Allied Army of the Orient, together with his wife, he tested over 8000 individuals from at least 16 different ethnic groups, and found that the frequency of blood groups differed depending on the ethnic background; group A was more common among people from Western Europe (English 46% A, 10% B), while B was more common among Asians (Indian 27% A, 47% B). Their report was accepted by The Lancet and published in 1919, and it was the first paper showing that blood group frequencies differ between populations.

In 1914, together with R. Klinger, Hirszfeld developed a serodiagnostic reaction test for syphilis, which did not, however, replace the Wasserman test introduced in 1906. His studies of goiter in Swiss endemic regions brought him into sharp disagreement with Eugen Bircher. Hirszfeld was a proponent of the today widely confirmed theory — that endemic goitres are caused by iodine deficiency in water and food, in opposition to the hydrotelluric theory, to which Bircher was partial to.

After the end of the war Hirszfeld and his wife returned to Warsaw, where he established a serum institute modeled after the Ehrlich Institute for Experimental Therapy in Frankfurt. He soon became the deputy director and scientific head of the State Hygiene Institute in Warsaw and, in 1924, professor there. He was involved in studies how ABO blood group incompatibility between mother and foetus may cause damage to the foetus or newborn. It seems that he was the first to propose that serologic incompatibility between mother and foetus may lead to abortion or fetal or neonatal disease. In 1931 he was named full professor at the University of Warsaw and served on many international boards. After the occupation of Poland by the German Army Hirszfeld was dismissed as a "non-Aryan" from the Hygiene Institute but, through the protection of friends, managed to do further scientific work at home until February 1941; it was, however, almost impossible for him to publish.

On 20 February 1941 Hirszfeld was forced to move into the Warsaw Ghetto with his wife and daughter. There he organized anti-epidemic measures and vaccination campaigns against typhus and typhoid, as well as conducting secret medical courses. He was helped there by the parish priest Marceli Godlewski. He described the living conditions in the ghetto in his book in The Story of One Life. Between March and June he and his family fled the ghetto and were able to survive underground through using false names and continually changing their hiding place; his daughter died of tuberculosis in the same year.

When a part of Poland was under Soviet Union control in 1944, Hirszfeld immediately collaborated in the establishment of the University of Lublin and became prorector of the university. In 1945 he became director of the Institute for Medical Microbiology at Wrocław and dean of the medical faculty. He continued his research on blood groups and together with obstetrician prof. Kazimierz Jabłoński, introduced exchange transfusion as a treatment for Hemolytic disease of the newborn, which saved the lives of almost 200 children. Both Hirszfelds resisted the pressure from the officials and never joined the Communist party. A few months before his death, the Institute of Immunology and Experimental Therapy in Wrocław, now affiliated with the Polish Academy of Sciences and named after him, was created. He became its first director.

Hirszfeld received many honors, including honorary doctorates from the universities of Prague (1950) and Zurich (1951). He wrote almost 400 works in German, French, English, and Polish, many in collaboration with other well-known scholars and many with his wife as well.

== See also ==
- Blood type
- List of Poles
- Occupational hygiene
