= Marceli Godlewski =

Roman Catholic priest from Poland

Monsignor Marceli Godlewski
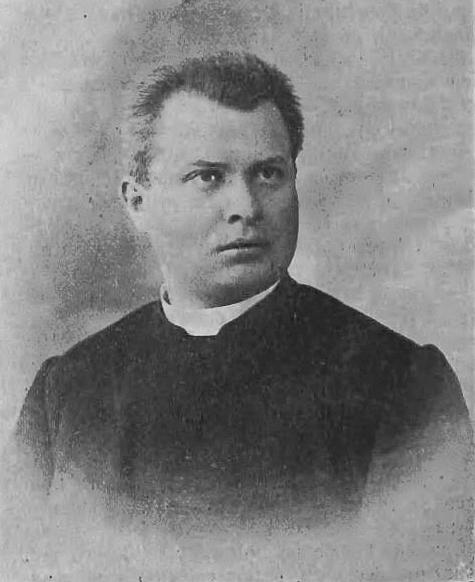
- Portrait of Godlewski, prior to 1906

Personal life
- Born: 15 January 1865 Turczyn, Belostoksky Uyezd, Russian Empire
- Died: 25 December 1945 (aged 80) Anin, Warsaw, Republic of Poland
- Resting place: Powązki Cemetery
- Parents: Ignacy (father); Katarzyna née Kuczyńska (mother)
- Education: Sejny Priest Seminary

Religious life
- Religion: Christian
- Denomination: Roman Catholicism
- School: CST

Marceli Godlewski (15 January 1865 – 25 December 1945) was a Polish priest who saved Jews during the Holocaust by hiding them, assisting in escapes, and issuing fake baptismal certificates. From 1915 until 1945, Fr. Monsignor Godlewski was a priest in Warsaw's All Saints parish, which became part of the Warsaw Ghetto in 1940. In this position, he was actively involved in helping Jews during the German occupation of Poland, for which he was posthumously awarded the medal of the Righteous Among the Nations in 2009. He was also a prelate, social activist, National Democrat politician and member of the Polish National Committee (1914–1917).

== Biography ==
Godlewski was born in Turczyn on 15 January 1865, the son of Ignacy and Katarzyna (née Kuczyńska). He graduated from the seminary in Sejny in 1886, was ordained a priest in 1888, and then studied in Rome, where he earned a doctorate in theology in 1893. In 1896 he moved to Warsaw where he became a professor at the seminary (1895–1902) and vicar of Holy Cross Church. In 1915 he became pastor of All Saints parish, a position he held until his death.

First in Łódź and then in Warsaw, he became involved in social activism, promoting Catholic social teaching, fighting socialist influence, and supporting the Polish national movement. Opposing revolutionary currents in 1905, he founded the Association of Christian Workers. Affiliated with the National Democracy, he opposed the association's affiliation with the Christian Democracy political party that was formed in independent Poland. He founded a number of magazines: Pracownik Polski, Któż jak Bóg, Nasz Sztandar, Chrześcijański Ruch Społeczny. He also edited Kronika Rodzinna (1905–1907). Godlewski often voiced anti-Semitic views, primarily related to fighting Jewish commerce. Yad Vashem described Godlewski as being "vocally anti-Semitic [for] most of his life". (Note: "When he found himself working within the ghetto, however, as one of his Jewish beneficiaries testified, 'He said he had been wrong all his life, not having known any Jews personally. Now that he had met us up close, he turned into a true friend.'") After 1918, Godlewski moved away from social activism and focused on parish work, but also became politically involved. In 1930, he joined the National Party.

The German invasion of Poland and the persecution of the Jewish population in the occupied country changed Godlewski's attitude toward Jews. All Saints' Church was located within the Jewish ghetto established by the Germans in 1940, and served both Christian Jews who were held there. He helped them escape. (Note: "Among the 27,712 Righteous Among the Nations, Poles constitute the most populous group, with 7,112 individuals. And there are thousands more who have yet to be recognised, but are nonetheless righteous. From diplomats to average citizens, the Polish people helped their Jewish brothers and sisters far and wide, with Poland, Switzerland, Hungary, Japan, Shanghai, Turkey and Britain being just a few of the locations.")

The exact dimensions of his change in actions are controversial, if not his attitude toward the Jews. For example, there is a question as to whether (or how many) baptisms of Jews occurred. Nor is it clear how many persons were spared from the persecution by his actions. (Note: "The fact that priests administered the sacrament of baptism in the ghetto is ambiguously assessed. According to some sources, several thousand Jews locked behind the wall decided to accept him. However, estimates of several hundred baptized people seem more realistic. Some neophytes probably treated the change of religion as a great spiritual experience. Others, perhaps most, took a very pragmatic approach. They hoped that as Christians they would be treated better by the Germans than other Jews. Perhaps they also hoped to get help from the Poles.")

Among them was Ludwik Hirszfeld; his memoirs are the main documentation of the assistance provided by Father Godlewski. Other notable individuals rescued by Godlewski included Louis-Christophe Zaleski-Zamenhof. Marceli Godlewski was an ailing, 78-year-old man at the time, so his main aid activity consisted of issuing hundreds of fake baptismal certificates, which allowed Jews to escape from the ghetto and survive outside. Together with the vicar Antoni Czarnecki, the priest also assisted in transmitting correspondence between the two sides of the ghetto wall, as well as organizing escapes. At his home in Anin, near Warsaw, Godlewski, with the help of the Franciscan Sisters of the Family of Mary, established an orphanage that housed some 20 Jewish children. He also organized a soup kitchen at the parish, which served meals to about 100 people a day. Many Jews, baptized and not, took up residence in the parsonage and its outbuildings. Yad Vashem stated "He also offered spiritual guidance and support indiscriminately, regardless of religious denomination, and was involved in creating the tunnel under the church on Leszno Street, which served for smuggling goods into and people out of the ghetto."

From October 1941, the Nazi occupiers decreed a mandatory death penalty for anyone assisting fugitives. This applied only to Poland among all the occupied European countries. "Besides losing a fifth of its population, the country saw much of its economy and infrastructure ruined, while its Catholic Church lost 20% of its 10,000 priests to summary executions and concentration camp deaths, in a German campaign to eradicate national culture and identity."

On 22 July 1942, with the start of the great liquidation action, the priests had to leave the ghetto. Godlewski left for Anin, where he became involved in orphanage work. All the children hiding in Anin survived the war. Godlewski died in Anin on 25 December 1945.

He is buried in Powązki Cemetery in Warsaw.

== Remembrance ==
Godlewski was posthumously awarded the Medal of the Righteous Among the Nations in 2009. At a ceremony at the Church of All Saints in Warsaw, proclaiming it as the "House of Life", Polish President Andrzej Duda recalled he was known as the "parish priest of the ghetto."

On International Holocaust Remembrance Day, the Polish bishops' conference honored Godlewski's work.

He is one of many Polish righteous Catholics documented in Ryszard Tyndorf's Wartime Rescue of Jews by the Polish Catholic Clergy: The Testimony of Survivors and Rescuers. (Note: "In March, [2023] a detailed study, published at Poland's John Paul II Catholic University of Lublin, documented help provided to Jews by 700 diocesan priests and over 2,000 nuns at more than 500 order-run centers. The 1,274-page book, prepared by Polish-Canadian researcher Ryszard Tyndorf, was published in cooperation with the university's Abraham J. Heschel Center for Catholic-Jewish Relations and includes testimonies from rescuers and survivors, as well as detailing the provision of undercover IDs and baptismal certificates to Jews by Catholic priests and bishops.")

Father Godlewski was one of the subjects of the 2017 documentary film All Saints' Oasis, which was directed by Roman Dobrzyński.

The Warsaw Ghetto Museum recognized his humanitarian efforts in episode 5 — Grzybowski Square — of its 16-part short-guided tour series, 'Remnants of the Warsaw Ghetto'.

== Selected publications ==
- A Good Catholic Among Protestants — Dobry katolik między protestantami, 1897
- Symbolic images of a sinful, justified and sanctified man — Obrazy symboliczne człowieka grzesznego, usprawiedliwionego i uświęconego, 1897
- Biblical Archeology (the first Polish textbook on the ancient history of Palestine) vol.1 1899, vol.2 1903 — Archeologia Biblijna (pierwszy polski podręcznik do historii starożytnej Palestynny) t.1 1899, t.2 1903
- Practical examination of conscience: (on the sacrament of penance) — Praktyczny rachunek sumienia: (o sakramencie pokuty), 1900
- Jesus, Mary, Joseph: a book for devotion — Jezus, Marya, Józef : książka do nabożeństwa, 1901
- Holy Father Pius X: short biography, decorated with a portrait and some drawing — Ojciec święty Pius X: krótki życiorys, ozdobiony portretem i kilkoma rysunkami, 1903
- In defense of the Church: a polemic with Lutheran pastors — W obronie Kościoła: polemika prowadzona z pastorami luterskimi, 1904
