= Emil Godlewski (junior) =

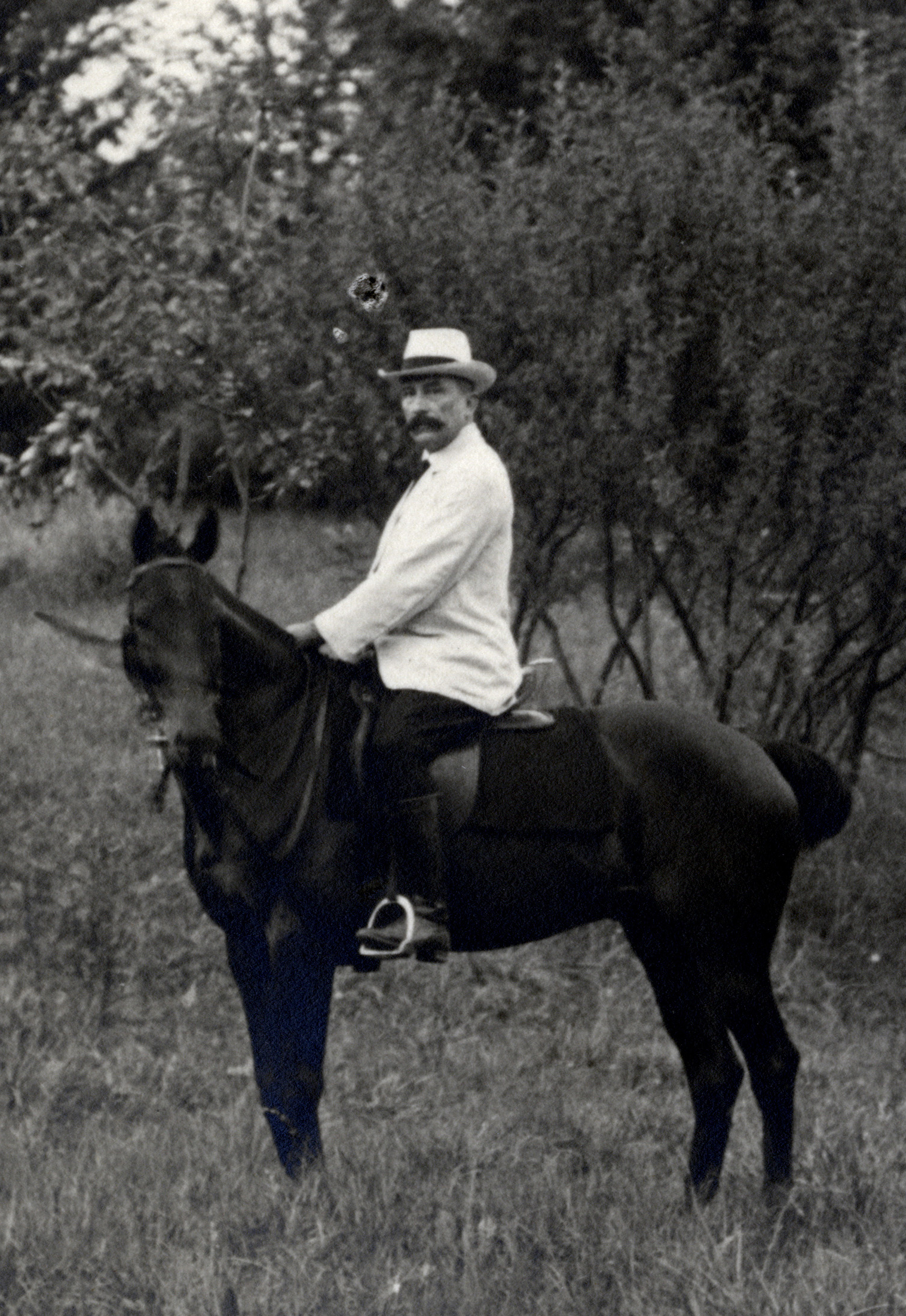
- Emil Godlewski (junior)
- Born: 1847
- Died: 1930 (aged 82–83)
- Scientific career
- Fields: embryology
- Workplaces: Jagiellonian University

Emil Godlewski (Polish pronunciation: [ˈɛmil ɡɔdˈlɛfskʲi]; 1875–1944) was a Polish embryologist, professor of the Jagiellonian University in Kraków. After early research on the development and histogenesis of muscles, professor Godlewski's scientific interests focused on regeneration and mechanisms regulating the process of fertilization, as well as early embryo development, blastulation and gastrulation. He was also interested in the origin of the primary differentiating cells in regenerates. He postulated the importance of epithelial tissue in this process and was the first to point out the change in the function, organization and role of the cells under the influence of external stimuli. Investigating fertilization and early development, he focused on the cooperation between the nucleus and the cytoplasm in the regulation of the early stages of development. Godlewski was also the author of the theory of migration of the inherited substances from the nucleus to the cytoplasm and, after their processing, from the cytoplasm to the nucleus. His works were never fragmentary, but always synthetic attempts at explaining important issues relating to the mechanisms of development. In 1936 Professor Godlewski was awarded the title of Member of the Pontifical Academy of Sciences. Apart from doing research and teaching, Emil Godlewski devoted a lot of time to social issues, especially those connected to medicine. When Poland regained independence after World War I, he actively participated in the reopening of the Jagiellonian University.
