= Brunon Godlewski =

Polish military personnel (1924–1989)

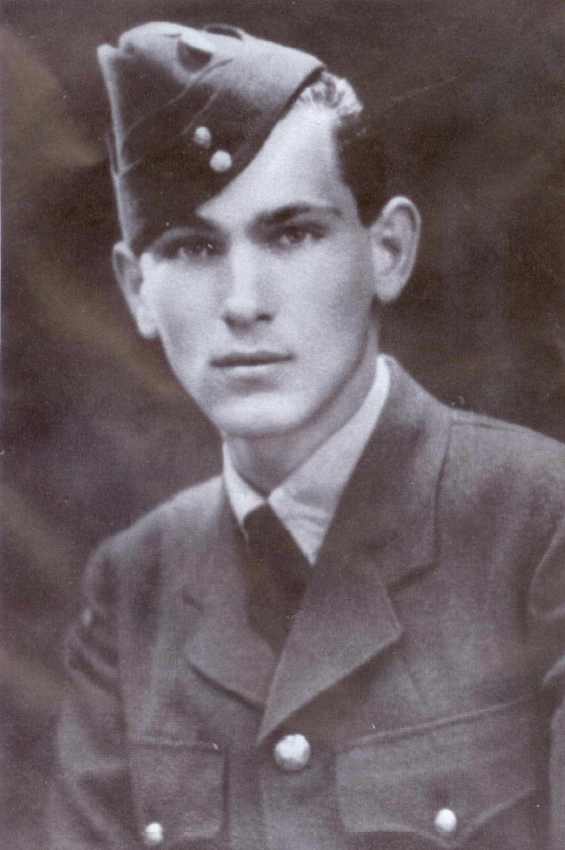
- Born: 7 January 1924; Chicago, Illinois
- Died: 12 June 1989 (aged 65); Dunedin, Florida
- Military career
- Allegiance: Poland; United Kingdom
- Branch: Polish Air Force; Royal Air Force
- Service years: 1942–1943
- Rank: Flight Sergeant
- Unit: No. 305 Polish Bomber Squadron
- Conflicts: Second World War
- Awards: Virtuti Militari, Cross of Valour, Distinguished Flying Medal, Air Force Medal, Distinguished Flying Cross, Purple Heart

Brunon Godlewski (also called Bronisław) (7 January 1924 – 12 June 1989) was a Polish-American airman of the Second World War. He served as an air gunner in the No. 305 Polish Bomber Squadron.

== Biography ==
Godlewski was born in Chicago in a family of Polish emigrants. In 1942, he volunteered to the Polish Air Force and arrived in the UK via Canada. From May to June 1942 he trained as air-gunner. On 1 August 1942, he was sent to the No. 18 Operational Training Unit (18 OTU) where he joined the crew of Kazimierz Artymiuk. On 1 January 1943 the crew was assigned to the No. 305 Bomber Squadron.

Godlewski flew for the first time over occupied France on 26 January. During his 9th bomber raid, on the night of 5 March over Essen his Vickers Wellington was attacked by German night-fighters. As a tail gunner, Godlewski shooting on enemies, gave instructions to the pilot, how to avoid Messerschmitts. He was badly wounded on both arms and transported to the hospital in Bishop's Stortford where his arms were amputated. On 2 April, in hospital, the general Ujejski decorated him with the Virtuti Militari.

After leaving the hospital, Godlewski stayed in the UK until the end of 1943, participating in meetings with volunteers and soldiers. Later he returned to his parents in Chicago. His story was made famous by journalists on both sides of the ocean. They mainly pointed out his sacrifice for the country he has never seen. Polish Americans organized a fundraiser for him. Thanks to the collected money, Godlewski became owner of two bars run by his mother. In later years, he lived in California and Florida, where he died in 1989.

== Awards ==
, Virtuti Militari, Silver Cross
Cross of Valour (Poland), twice
Distinguished Flying Medal
Air Force Medal
Distinguished Flying Cross
Purple Heart
