= Emil Godlewski (senior) =

Emil Godlewski, senior
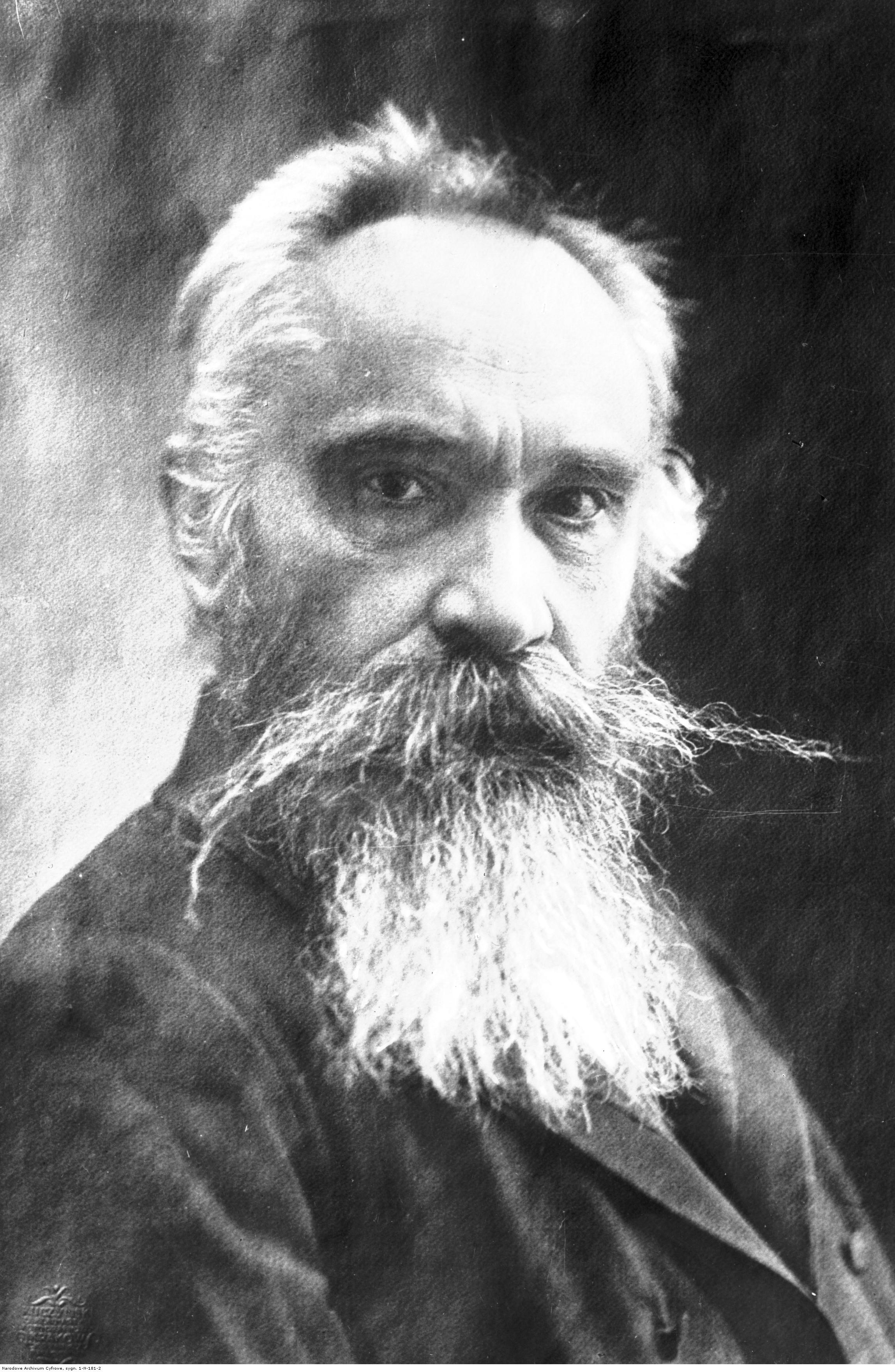
- Born: 1847
- Died: 1930 (aged 82–83)
- Occupation: botanist

Emil Godlewski (1847–1930) was a Polish botanist. Professor of the Jagiellonian University in Kraków, he was one of the key figures responsible for developing the field of botany in Poland.

One of his collaborators was the Polish botanist Gabriela Balicka-Iwanowska, Ph.D.
