= Statue of King Matt the First =

Monument in Szczecin, Poland

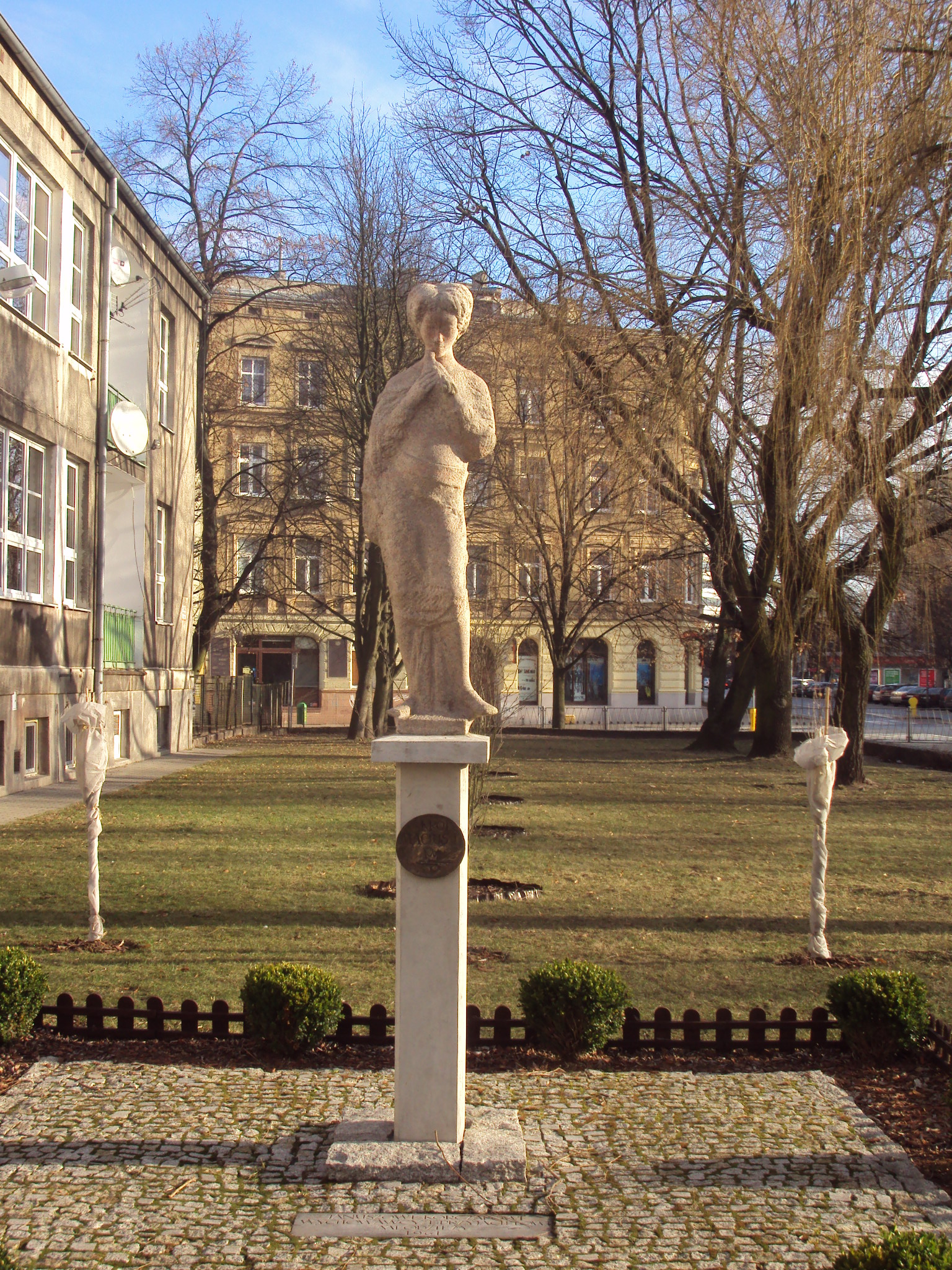
- The monument in 2017.
- Interactive map of Statue of King Matt the First
- Location: 9 Rayskiego Street, Szczecin, Poland
- Coordinates: 53°26′01.7″N 14°32′59.7″E
- Designer: Mieczysław Welter
- Type: Statue
- Material: Granite, concrete
- Height: 295 cm (116 in)
- Completion date: 1 June 1961
- Dedicated to: Janusz Korczak

The statue of King Matt the First (Note: Polish: Pomnik Króla Maciusia I) is a monument in Szczecin, Poland, placed in front of the 54th Primary School, at 9 Rayskiego Street. It is dedicated to writer Janusz Korczak and consists of a statue depicting the titular character from his 1923 children's novel King Matt the First. It was designed by Mieczysław Welter and unveiled on 1 June 1961 at Bałuki Street. The monument was temporary removed in 2012 and unveiled at its current location on 21 March 2013.

== History ==
The moment was designed by Mieczysław Welter and commissioned by the Department of Culture of the Szczecin Voivodeship National Council. It was dedicated to writer Janusz Korczak, and depicted the titular character from his children's book King Matt the First. The monument was unveiled on 1 June 1961, in front of the Janusz Korczak 54th Primary School near Bałuki Street. In 2012, the school was relocated to the new building at Rayskiego Street. As such, the monument was removed and renovated. It was unveiled in the new location on 21 March 2013.

== Characteristics ==
The monument is placed in front of the building of the Janusz Korczak 54th Primary School in Szczecin, within the neighbourhood of Centrum. It consists of a statue made from pink granite, depicting the titular character from the 1923 children's novel King Matt the First by Janusz Korczak. It has a form of a child, standing with slightly lowered head, looking at the dictionary that it holds in its hands. The statue has a height of 145 cm. It is placed on a small concrete pier, with a plaque placed on it. It reads Król Maciuś I, which translates from Polish to King Matt the First. The moment has a total height of 295 cm. At its base, in the ground, is embedded a gunmetal plaque dedicated to Korczak, with an inscription as transcribed below.

Polish text

Januszowi Korczakowi, wychowawcy i przyjacielowi młodzieży, 1961

Translation:
English translation

To Janusz Korczak, teacher and friend of the youth, 1961
