= Paulina Appenszlak =

Polish-Jewish journalist, editor, poet, and feminist (c. 1900–1976)

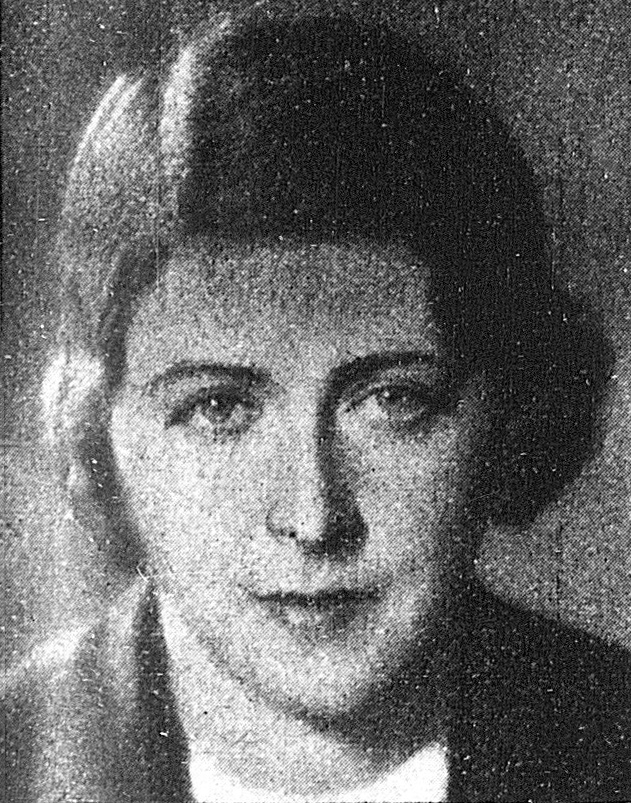
- Born: Paulina Jamajka cca 1900
- Died: 1976; Israel
- Occupations: journalist, editor, translator, poet
- Writing career
- Language: Polish, Hebrew

Paulina Appenszlak née Jamajka (cca 1900–1976) was a Polish-Jewish journalist, editor, poet, translator and a feminist. She cofounded and was the editor-in-chief of the Ewa magazine – the only Polish-language weekly of the interwar period for Jewish women.

== Career ==
Paulina Appenszlak debuted in 1919 with poems and literary translations in a Polish-language weekly called Tygodnik Nowy, where she later had a column. She went on to contribute to other Jewish titles, such as Divrei Akiva or Nasz Przegląd, and led the women's section in the latter. For the Nasz Przegląd, she wrote a great number of articles on the situation of Jewish women.

As translator, she was a valued contributor to the Safrus publishing house which created a series focused on popularising Hebrew and Yiddish literature.

In 1928, with Iza Rachela Wagmanowa, Paulina Appenszlak cofounded the Ewa magazine – the only Polish-language weekly of the interwar period for Jewish women. Appenszlak became its editor-in-chief, while Wagmanowa was it publisher. The magazine focused on social and feminist issues, such as the fight against human trafficking, protection of victims of violence, access to contraception and abortion, or gender pay gap. Although the editors tended to avoid strictly political content, they covered Jewish women in politics and discussed the question of accessibility of higher posts to them. The magazine ran until 1933, when it was discontinued for unknown reasons.

In the absence of her own weekly, Appenszlak continued to head the women's section of Nasz Przegląd where she kept alive the spirit of Ewa. A year after folding Ewa, Appenszlak with her husband Jakub launched a magazine called Lektura, with the aim of bringing together different generations of Polish-Jewish writers. Despite publishing works by well-known authors, the magazine was short-lived.

In 1939, Appenszlak traveled to the United States, but returned to Poland just before the World War II. She managed to leave Warsaw in the first days of September and emigrated to Palestine, where she published in women's magazines and went on to become an editor at Olam HaIsha. She also contributed to the New York-based Nasza Trybuna and to the Al HaMishmar. In 1946, she published a biography of Janusz Korczak called Ha-Doktor nish’ar: Roman biyografi ‘al Yanush Korts’ak, which was then translated into Yiddish and Spanish.

== Private life ==
She was born around 1900, probably in Warsaw, as Paulina Jamajka. She married fellow journalist Jakub Appenszlak, with whom she had a son, Henryk. The couple separated and Paulina unsuccessfully tried to gain a divorce. Paulina's second partner was a sports journalist Zygmunt Fogiel, whom she likely married after the death of Jakub in 1950. Appenszlak's son, Henryk, served in the Israeli army and died at a volunteer post in 1949.

Paulina Appenszlak died in 1976, in Israel.
