= Wizard's Hall =

1991 fantasy novel by Jane Yolen

- Author: Jane Yolen
- Illustrator: Trina Schart Hyman
- Cover artist: Trina Schart Hyman
- Language: English
- Publisher: Harcourt
- Publication date: June 1991
- Publication place: United States
- ISBN: 0-15-298132-2

Wizard's Hall is a 1991 fantasy novel by Jane Yolen, and illustrated by Trina Schart Hyman. The novel has been compared to the later, more famous Harry Potter series.

== Characters and story ==
The mother of shy Henry sends him to Wizard's Hall where he can train to become a wizard. At the Hall he is renamed Thornmallow, suggesting that he is prickly on the outside yet soft inside. He becomes quite conspicuous as he covers a classroom in snow, yells during an orientation speech and has other embarrassing moments. He soon learns that he is one of 113 students who are being prepared to confront the evil wizard Nettle and his huge Beast. Thornmallow feels he may not be equal to the challenge.

== Analysis ==
The Harry Potter series, which began publishing six years later, has many similarities. However, Yolen believes the similarities are coincidental.

== Reception ==
Publishers Weekly were fans of the children's book and wrote "this captivating package is neatly tied up by the marvelous bow of Yolen's (Owl Moon; Dove Isabeau) masterful prose, with a few lilting verses thrown in."

While Kirkus Reviews commended the author by stating that the story was "[b]riskly told, with plenty of engaging humor and wordplay."

== See also ==
- Kaytek the Wizard
- A Wizard of Earthsea
