= Little King Matty...and the Desert Island =

Book by Janusz Korczak

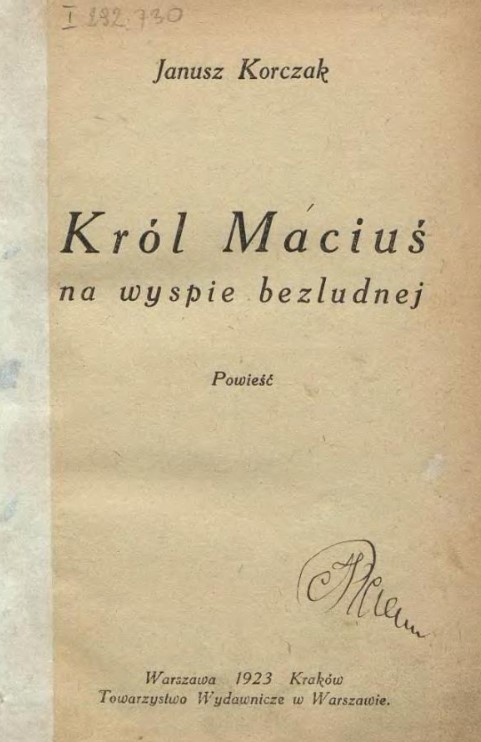
Polish original of Little King Matty and the Desert Island

Little King Matty and the Desert Island (Polish: Król Maciuś na wyspie bezludnej) is a children's book by Janusz Korczak, first published in 1923. It is the sequel to King Matt the First, depicting the exile of the young king.

The psychologist writes a picture of an angry, sensitive child prince who is crowned king after the illness and death of his parents. The young king learns through life and by individual tuition from various tutors and teachers. Matty’s learning is, at first, informal and motivated by anger and a strong imagination. However, Matty’s learning style then becomes analytical and, as time goes by, he becomes a catalyst, a facilitator and a motivator.

== Editions ==
The book was first published in Polish in 1923 as Król Maciuś na wyspie bezludnej. It was not translated into English until 1990.

The October 1990 English edition by Joanna Pinewood Enterprises is an unabridged translation from the original, combining two stories published as Little King Matty ...and the Desert Island (ISBN 1-871-424-01-1). This edition was translated by Dr Adam Czasak and edited by Krzysztof Bahrynowski.

In 2009, Tomasz Chmielik translated the book into Esperanto and held a competition for children from Lublin in Poland to design the front cover.

== Plot summary ==
Little King Matty...and the Desert Island is a story about freedom, democracy, politics, travel, corruption, tyranny and reform. Matty becomes king after his father’s death: he then must learn about “etiquette” – what kings can do and what they cannot – he has to learn to interpret the lies of his adult political advisors – and diplomacy “all about telling fibs”. His efforts to bring about reform take him to war with three neighboring kingdoms who try to partition his country. He succeeds in vanquishing them and wins by treaty. However, because his country is bankrupt, the other European countries refuse to provide him with aid to build ships so that he can make his kingdom economically sustainable. So, he goes to the land of the cannibals and witch-doctors where the child king succeeds in making a treaty that saves his kingdom, much to the annoyance of some of his political advisors and two of his vanquished neighbours.

The story is romantic; the daughter of the African king, Klu Klu, falls in love with Matty and smuggles herself into his kingdom. She kills a rabid wolf with her dagger, saving Matty’s life and the people of the capital and becomes the People’s Heroine. She becomes a role model for all women in Europe and Africa. She learns faster, hunts better and is Matty’s best warrior.

Matty’s reforms anger his adult enemies, who secretly encourage anarchy and invade his country again. His African warriors and Princess bravely fight alongside Matty, but he is betrayed by some of his cowardly adult citizens. His three enemies partition his country and, in the manner of Napoleon, order the child King to be banished to a deserted Island. However, before this is implemented, Matty escapes from gaol and is rescued by his African Princess and her father who renegotiates Matty’s sentence. The European kings cheat and Klu Klu’s father declares war on the whites. During a few paragraphs, there are references to Europe’s colonial atrocities in Africa and how Europe relies on Africa for goods like chocolate.

Matty chooses to go into exile to protect his country. However, he escapes when a swimming postal rat from Klu Klu reaches him with urgent messages; he is kidnapped by his worst and strongest enemy and hides in a maximum security prison where he is cared for and taught by the worst criminals. Later he hides his identity and goes to a school where peer pressure prevents him from doing better, until he loses his temper. He, the victim, nearly becomes a bully. It is here that he learns that this worst enemy wants to go to war against his kingdom for a third time. As anger turns to bitterness, self-analysis saves Matty; Matty uses and learns humour to prevent him becoming maudlin. Thus, he eventually regains his self-confidence and rescues his kingdom.

The book ends with Matty first becoming disillusioned, then dying.
