= CENTOS (charity) =

CENTOS (Polish: Centralne Towarzystwo Opieki nad Sierotami, also Związek Towarzystw Opieki nad Dziećmi i Sierotami; Yiddish: Farband far Kinder Szuc un Jatomim Ferzorgung; literally, Central Society for the Care of Orphans, or Central Union of Associations for the Care of Jewish Children and Orphans) was a Polish-Jewish children's-aid society. Founded in 1924, it became a "leading organization for Jewish childcare" in the Second Polish Republic and was highly active in the Warsaw Ghetto during The Holocaust in Poland.

== Interwar Poland ==
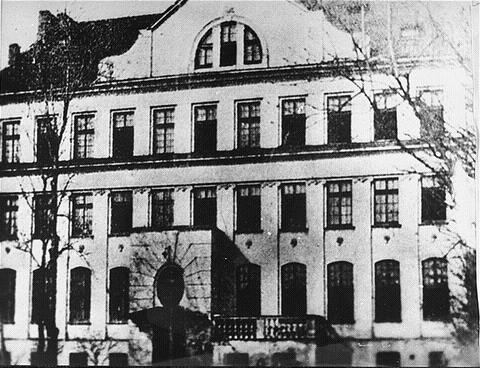
Orphanage at 92 Krochmalna Street, Warsaw, where Janusz Korczak worked: a CENTOS-supported institution.

CENTOS was founded in April 1924 by Jewish activists who sought to help children who had become orphaned in the aftermath of World War I. It was formed by the integration of hundreds of smaller regional institutions, mostly focused on caring for Jewish orphans. In addition to its headquarters, it had nine regional committees. It was affiliated with the American Jewish Joint Distribution Committee, which provided it with financial support. It also received support from Polish central and local governments. Another major source of income was individual donors, estimated at between 40,000 and 50,000.

CENTOS' first chairman was Polish politician and social activist Rafał Szereszowski. Other major interwar activists included Witold Wiesenberg, Maks Schaff, Anzelm Halpern, and Józef Kohn.

CENTOS aided disadvantaged families and ran orphanages, schools, and clinics. It also organized summer and winter holidays for children of poor families.

CENTOS published several monthly magazines for social workers, teachers, and other professionals involved in child care, two of them in Yiddish (Unzer Kind, which later merged with the similar Dos Kind and Dos Szucloze Kind;) and the Polish-language Przegląd Społeczny. Scholars and activists who wrote for them included Stefania Wilczyńska, who in the late 1930s also worked as a CENTOS inspector. Another author who published in those outlets was Janusz Korczak, whose Warsaw orphanage, with which Wilczyńska was also affiliated, was also supported by CENTOS.

CENTOS was present throughout the Second Polish Republic, but was most active in the Warsaw and Lwów Provinces. In 1928, of some 4,500 orphans in CENTOS' care, the two committees responsible for those two regions each cared for some 1,500 orphans, while the committees responsible for the seven remaining regions cared for the remaining 1,500. CENTOS is estimated to have employed at least 1,000 people.

In the 1930s CENTOS sought to aid German Jews facing growing discrimination in Nazi Germany. In 1938 an estimated 15,000 children were aided by CENTOS, more than half relying on CENTOS infrastructure such as orphanages. That year, CENTOS-affiliated institutions included 26 orphanages, 75 day-care facilities, 3 clinics, and over 30 holiday resorts. CENTOS functioned in over 200 Polish municipalities.

== World War II ==
CENTOS continued to operate following Germany's occupation of Poland in World War II. In 1940 CENTOS was still active in 74 locations in the General Government. In 1940-1941 CENTOS directors included Adolf Bergman and Józef Barski.

Most notably, CENTOS was highly active in the Warsaw Ghetto during the Holocaust in Poland. There were 20 day centers in that Ghetto to look after thousands of children. CENTOS was also present in the Brzesko Ghetto, along with Jewish Social Self-Aid (JSS, Żydowska Samopomoc Społeczna, Jüdische Soziale Selbsthilfe) and the Committee for Aid to Refugees and the Poor. In 1940 CENTOS helped some 130 children. By one estimate, without CENTOS, Jewish orphans in the ghettos would have starved to death within a few months.

CENTOS was also active in the ghettos' Jewish resistance, not only in its official capacity of providing food and shelter, but clandestinely, helping provide cover for resistance operatives, smuggling weapons into the ghettos, and helping maintain communication and smuggling channels between the Jewish and Polish resistance.

CENTOS was not the only Jewish humanitarian aid organization that sought to operate in the early years of the German occupation. Others included Jewish Social Self-Aid and Aid to Jews (Centrala Pomocy dla Żydów, Jüdische Unterstüzungsstelle für das Generalgouvernement, JUS).

Most of the children cared for by CENTOS perished in Nazi German concentration camps in the final stage of the Holocaust, following the liquidations of the Nazi ghettos and the relocation of survivors to the concentration camps. Many CENTOS personnel, including Korczak and Wilczyńska, accompanied the children to the camps and also perished there.

== See also ==
- Children in the Holocaust
- Kehilla (modern)
- Welfare in Poland
