= Janusz Korczak Monument, Warsaw =

Monument in Śródmieście, Poland

Coordinates: 52°14′01″N 21°00′16″E

Janusz Korczak Monument in Warsaw at Świętokrzyski Park was unveiled in 2006. It is dedicated to the memory of Janusz Korczak. It has been designed by Jan Bohdan Chmielewski and Zbigniew Mikielewicz.

The initiative to build a monument to commemorate Korczak appeared just after the war. However, due to difficulties in raising funds, the works did not go beyond the stage of plans.

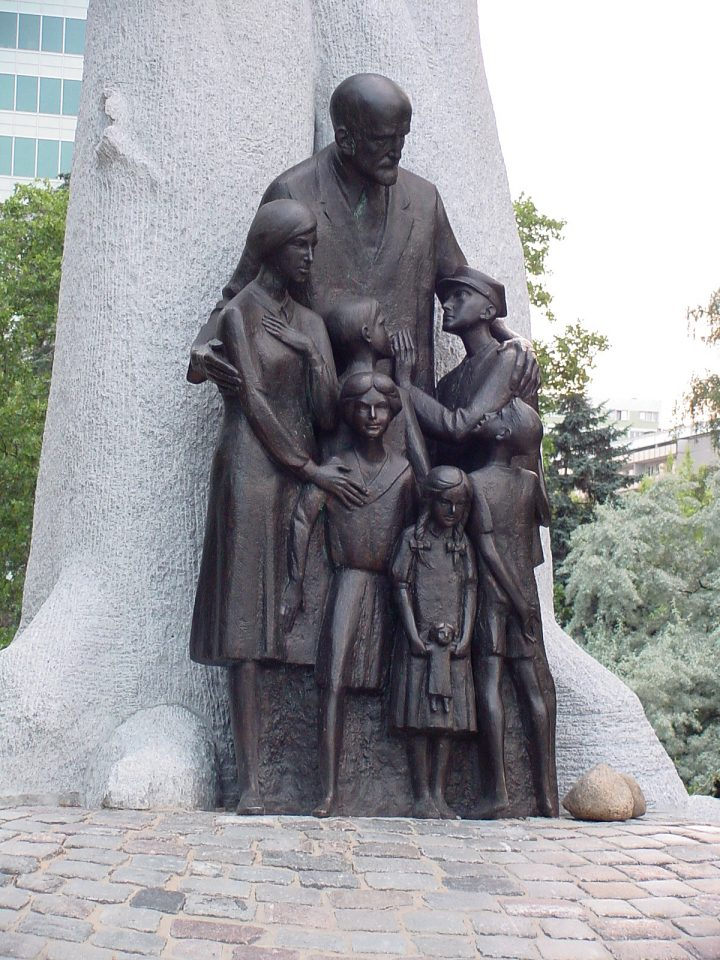
Monument to Korczak in Warsaw

In 1999, on the initiative of Gołda Tencer, General Director of the Shalom Foundation and Prof. Jadwiga Bińczycka, President of the Janusz Korczak Polish Association, the issue of building a monument was revived. Many people from the worlds of art, science and politics took patronage of the initiative. Funds for the construction of the monument were raised by organizing charity concerts, art auctions and support from the city authorities. The design of the monument was selected as a result of an international contest, announced in 2001. The project by Bohdan Chmielewski and Zbigniew Wilma won. The cornerstone of the monument was placed in 2003 by the Mayor of Warsaw, Lech Kaczyński. The monument was unveiled in 2006, on June 1, on Children's Day. The ceremony was a state event, attended by the President of the Republic of Poland Lech Kaczyński and the President of the Polish Janusz Korczak Association Prof. Jadwiga Bińczycka, Rabbi Michael Schudrich and the General Director of the Shalom Foundation Gołda Tencer.

The monument was erected at the site of a house for Jewish orphans, from which Janusz Korczak set off on his journey to the concentration camp with his pupils.

There are several monuments commemorating Janusz Korczak in Warsaw itself, the best known of which is the one located in the Jewish cemetery on Okopowa Street, which serves as his symbolic grave. However, the monument set up in the Świętokrzyski Park is not only the largest but also, due to its very convenient location, the most frequently visited by school trips and tourists monument commemorating Janusz Korczak. Every year, around June 1st, on Children's Day, trips from Warsaw schools go to the monument.
