= Stefania Wilczyńska =

Polish educator; Holocaust victim

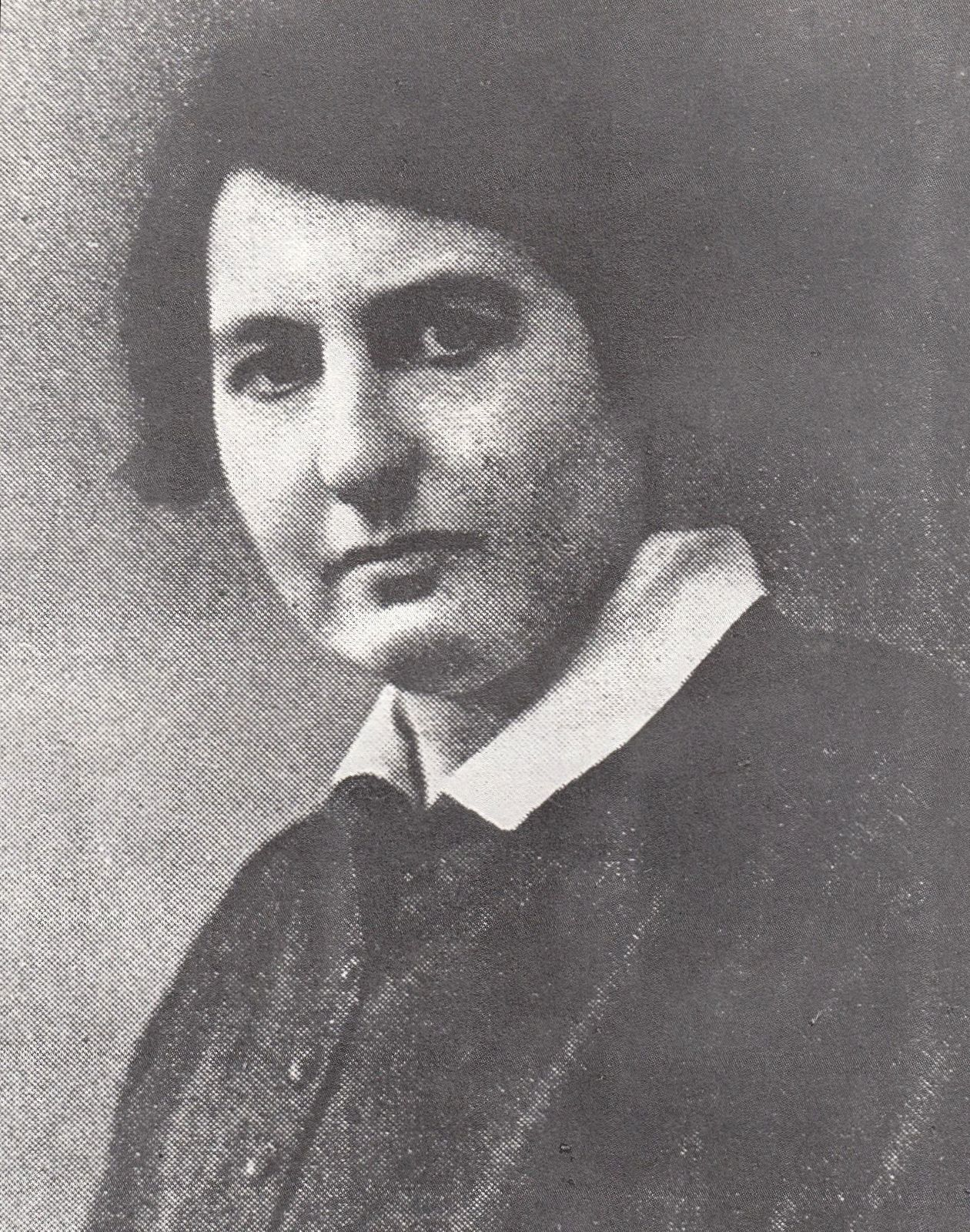
- Born: 26 May 1886; Warsaw, Poland
- Died: 6 August 1942 (aged 56); Treblinka
- Occupations: teacher, social activist

Stefania "Stefa" Wilczyńska (26 May 1886 – 6 August 1942) was a Polish educator who was murdered in the Holocaust.

She was born into a wealthy Jewish family in Warsaw, trained as a teacher and was educated at the University of Liège in Belgium and the University of Geneva in Switzerland. She returned to Warsaw and worked at a Jewish orphanage, later becoming its director. She met Dr. Janusz Korczak in 1909 and went to work at his Jewish orphanage. She was the main educator in his orphanages. Besides looking after the day-to-day operation of the orphanage, she also organized fundraising activities in support of the orphanage. During World War I, Korczak was called up for military service and Wilczyńska had to manage the orphanage by herself.

In the interwar period she published several articles in the magazines about child care published by CENTOS.

Wilczyńska visited Palestine in 1934 and 1937. Arrangements were made for her to leave Poland after the Nazi invasion of Poland in 1939, but she declined and moved with the orphanage to the Warsaw Ghetto. In August 1942, as part of the Kinderaktion, residents of Jewish orphanages were deported to the gas chambers at Treblinka. Korczak, Wilczyńska and the staff of the orphanage were given the option of avoiding the deportation, but chose to remain with the orphans.

A plaque dedicated to the memory of Wilczyńska has been placed at the original site of the orphanage.
