= Kaytek the Wizard =

Book by Janusz Korczak

- 2012 US edition
- Author: Janusz Korczak
- Original title: Kajtuś Czarodziej
- Translator: Antonia Lloyd-Jones
- Illustrator: Avi Katz (2012 US edition)
- Language: Polish
- Genre: Children's novel, Contemporary fantasy
- Publisher: Penlight Publications (2012 US edition)
- Publication date: 1933
- Publication place: Poland
- English publication date: 1 August 2012
- Media type: Print (Hardcover)
- Pages: 272 (2012 hardcover edition)
- ISBN: 978-0-9838685-0-7 (1st US edition)

Kaytek the Wizard (Polish: Kajtuś Czarodziej) (alternatively Kaytek the Sorcerer or Kaytek the Magician, with some title renderings retaining the original name Kaytus instead of Kaytek) is a 1933 Contemporary fantasy children's novel by Polish author, physician, and child pedagogue Janusz Korczak.

It was published in English translation in August 2012, the second of Korczak's novels to be published in English. His other novel to be published in English was King Matt the First. In addition, several of his pedagogical works have also been translated.

== Plot ==
The book depicts a schoolboy who gains magic powers. At first, Kaytek acts as a selfish child, using his power for mischief. He eventually becomes dissatisfied with himself, and leaves his home town, where he had acquired a reputation as a troublemaker. On his travels he meets Zosia, a girl who uses her magical power for good. Together they fight an evil wizard, and Kaytek chooses the path of a good mage.

The book contains some gaps, including one of the chapters, which were sections that were crossed out because they were too frightening to children.

== Reception ==
The book has been praised by critics, and is seen as part of the Polish canon of children's literature. It was highly popular during the 1930s, both in Polish and translated into several other languages. In more modern reviews and discussions, the book has been often compared to the Harry Potter book series.

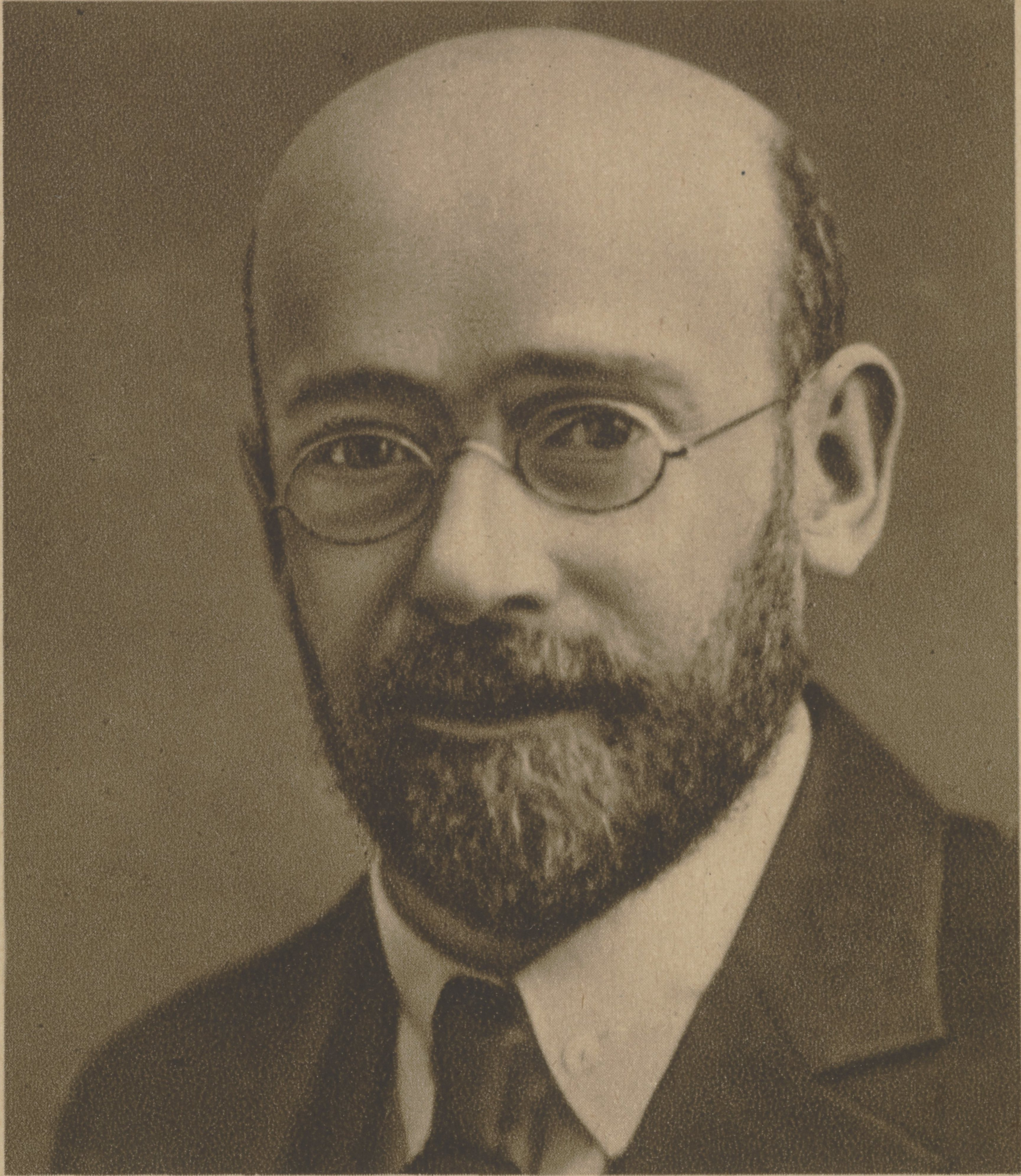
Kaytek contains a pedagogical message by Korczak, concerning growing up, adult decisions, and responsibilities.

The book is one of Korczak's most famous works, and contains his pedagogical message. As King Matt, from Korczak's other novel, King Matt the First, Kaytek must deal with his power, which is greater than those of an average person, and can cause suffering to others if misused. The major theme of this book is growing up, and how the children must make adult decisions about good and evil.

Kaytek has a far more difficult path than Harry Potter: he has no Hogwarts-type School of Magic where he could be taught by expert mages, but must learn to use and control his powers by himself – and most importantly, to learn his limitations. The book is set partly in Kaytek's unnamed hometown, which is recognizably 1930s Warsaw, where Kaytek causes chaos by making increasingly wild magical pranks, and partly in America and specifically in Holywood where Kaytek uses magic to become a film star overnight but is less than happy with the result. In Korczak's worlds, a happy ending is not guaranteed, and the child-hero must learn about the limitations of power and the consequences of its abuse.

According to Polish sociologist and writer Kinga Dunin, Kaytek, in pedagogical terms, is a superior book to Harry Potter, as within one book, Kaytek experiences much more growth than Harry; furthermore, the world is more realistic, less black and white. At the same time, Dunin criticises the book for what she considers outdated attitudes to issues of gender and race.

== Adaptations ==
The story has been adapted for theatre several times, including in 2008 (directed by Łukasz Kos) and 2012 (directed by Jerzy Łazewski).

Kaytek has been adapted for television, in a 1997 production by Julia Wernio that premiered in 1999. That production was 46 minutes in length.

A film adaptation was planned for a 2018 release, following a 14 October 2011 agreement between the Polish Book Institute (copyright holder to all works by Korczak) and Media Brigade of Wrocław. The movie, under the title Kajtek Czarodziej, directed by Magdalena Łazarkiewicz, premiered in 2023.

== See also ==
- Wizard's Hall, a short story that has also been compared to Harry Potter
