= Holy Cross Park =

Urban park in Warsaw, Poland

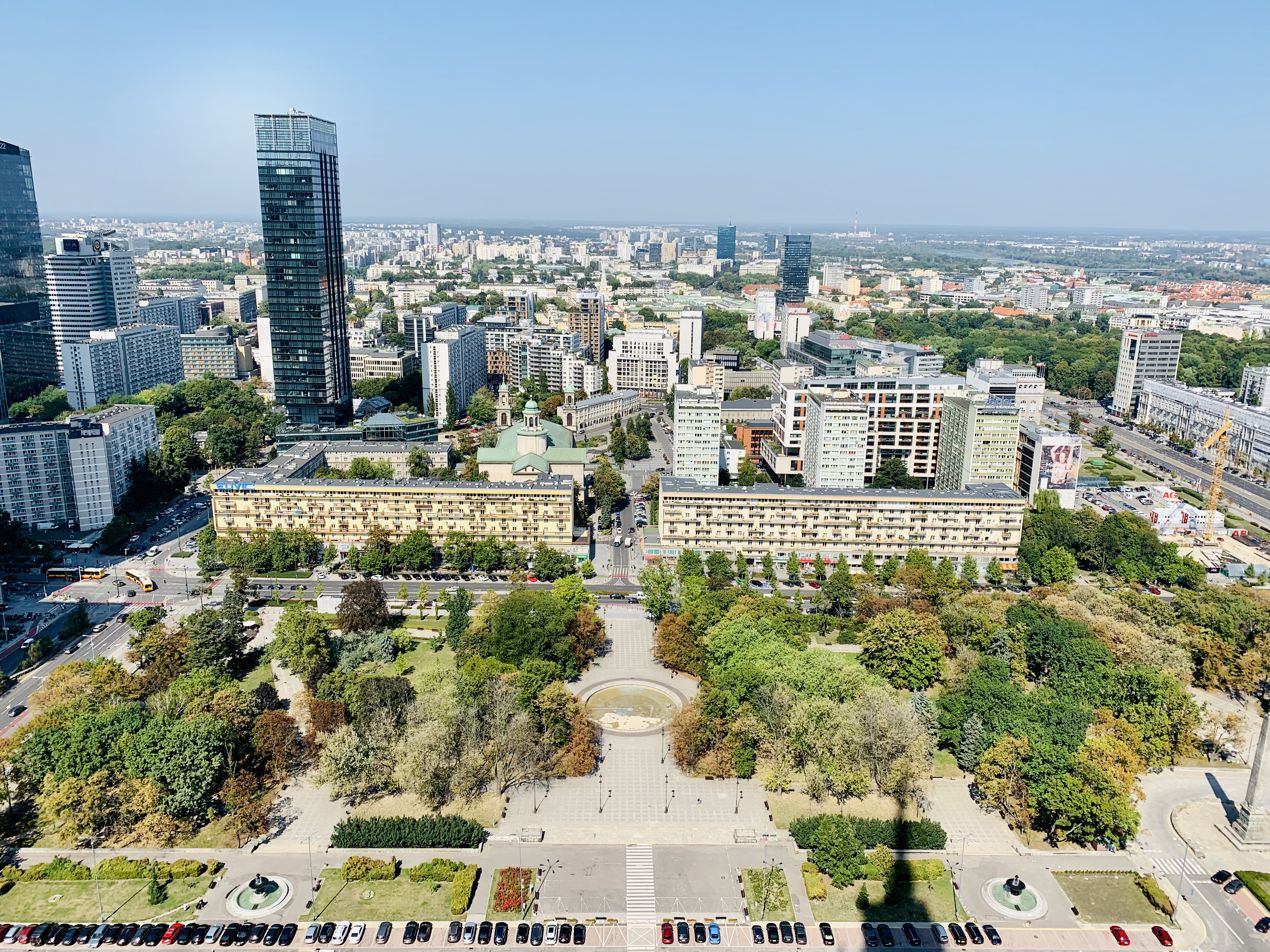
- Aerial wiew of the Holy Cross Park, as seen from the Palace of Culture and Science in 2019
- Interactive map of Holy Cross Park
- Type: Urban park
- Location: Warsaw, Poland
- Coordinates: 52°14′03.62″N 21°00′23.256″E
- Area: 6 hectares (15 acres)
- Created: 22 July 1955
- Designer: Tadeusz Nurkiewicz
- Public transit: Centrum; Świętokrzyska

The Holy Cross Park (Polish: Park Świętokrzyski) is an urban park in Warsaw, Poland. It is located in the district of Downtown, between Plater Street, Świętokrzyska Street, Marszałkowska Street, and the Palace of Culture and Science. The park was opened in 1955.

== Name ==
The Holy Cross Park (Polish: Park Świętokrzyski) is named after the Świętokrzyska Street (Holy Cross Street), which in turn was named after the Holy Cross Church.

Originally, it was named the Stalin Square Park (Polish: Park na placu im. Stalina), and later the Palace of Culture and Science Park (Polish: Park przy Pałacu Kultury i Nauki), before being given its current name.

== History ==
The Holy Cross Park was designed by Tadeusz Nurkiewicz, as part of the surrounding of the Palace of Culture and Science, in place of deconstructed fragments of Pańska, Sienna, Zielna, and Wielka Streets. It was placed between Plater Street, Świętokrzyska Street, Marszałkowska Street, and the Palace of Culture and Science.

The construction of the park begun in 1954. As part of it, there were planted around 400 trees and 7000 bushes. Some saplings came from Szczecin and Kamieniec Ząbkowicki, while others were replanted from the area of Księcia Trojdena Street in Warsaw. The park was opened on 22 July 1955.

On 1 June 2006, in the park was unveiled the Janusz Korczak Monument by Zbigniew Wilma and Jan Bohdan Chmielewski. It was placed where from 1941 to 1942 was located the Janusz Korczak's orphanage.

From 2007 to 2009, in the park functioned the Freedom of Speech Forum (Polish: Forum Wolności Słowa), an area where everyone was allowed to organize protests and share their believes, even without acquiring a permit to do so. It was established by politicians of the Law and Justice party, and inspired by similar in function Speakers' Corner in the Hyde Park in London, United Kingdom. It was not popular, having only a few protests organized there, and was dismantled in 2009.

== Characteristics ==
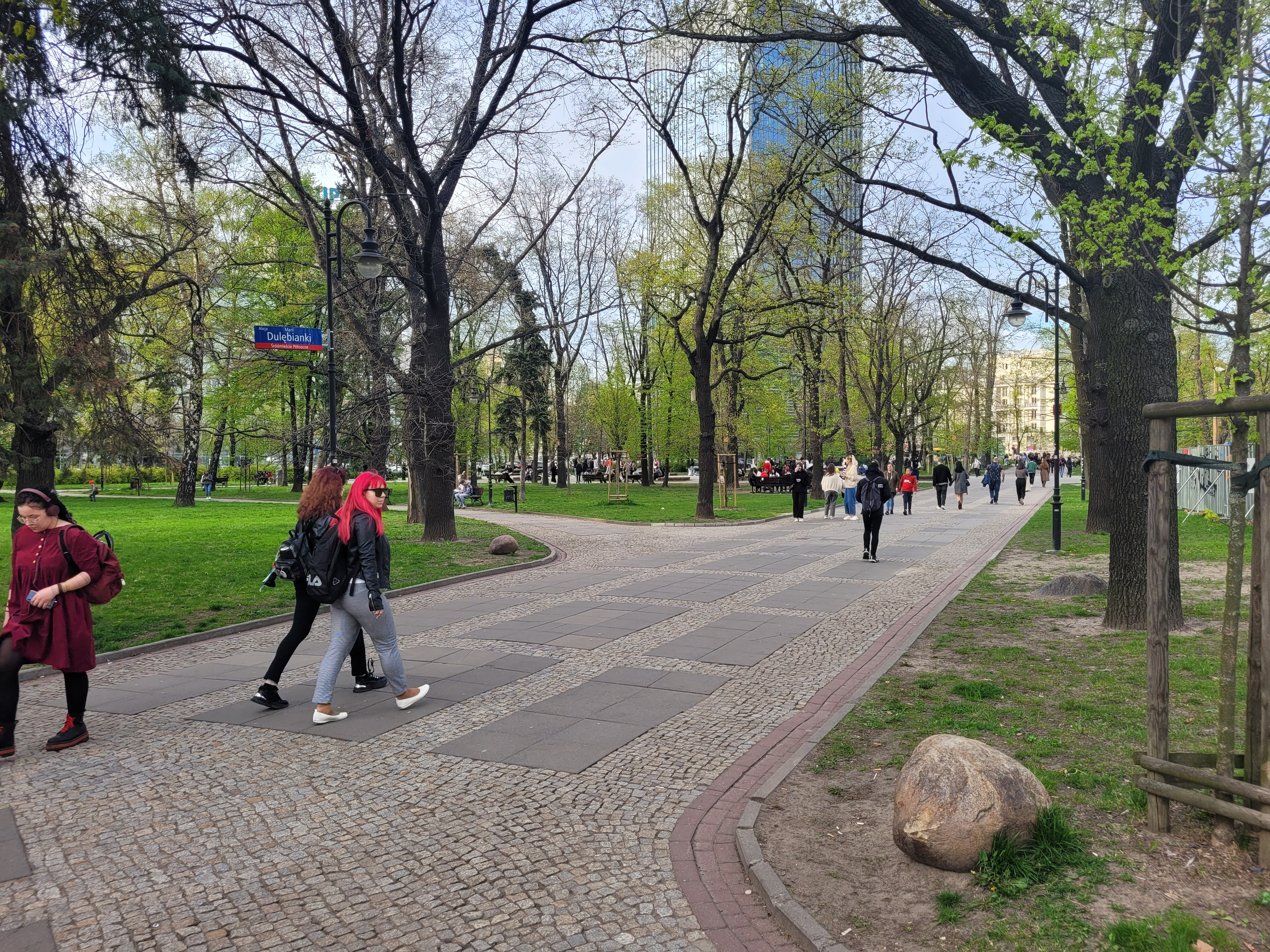
A pathway in the Holy Cross Park in 2022

The park is located between Plater Street, Świętokrzyska Street, Marszałkowska Street, and the Palace of Culture and Science, and has the shape of a rectangle. It has a flat terrain, covered in around 400 trees, of 15 species, and around 7,000 decorative bushes. It has the total area of 6 ha.

In the park is the Janusz Korczak Monument by Zbigniew Wilma and Jan Bohdan Chmielewski. There is also a sundial installation.

The park borders the Parade Square to the southeast.

== Gallery ==
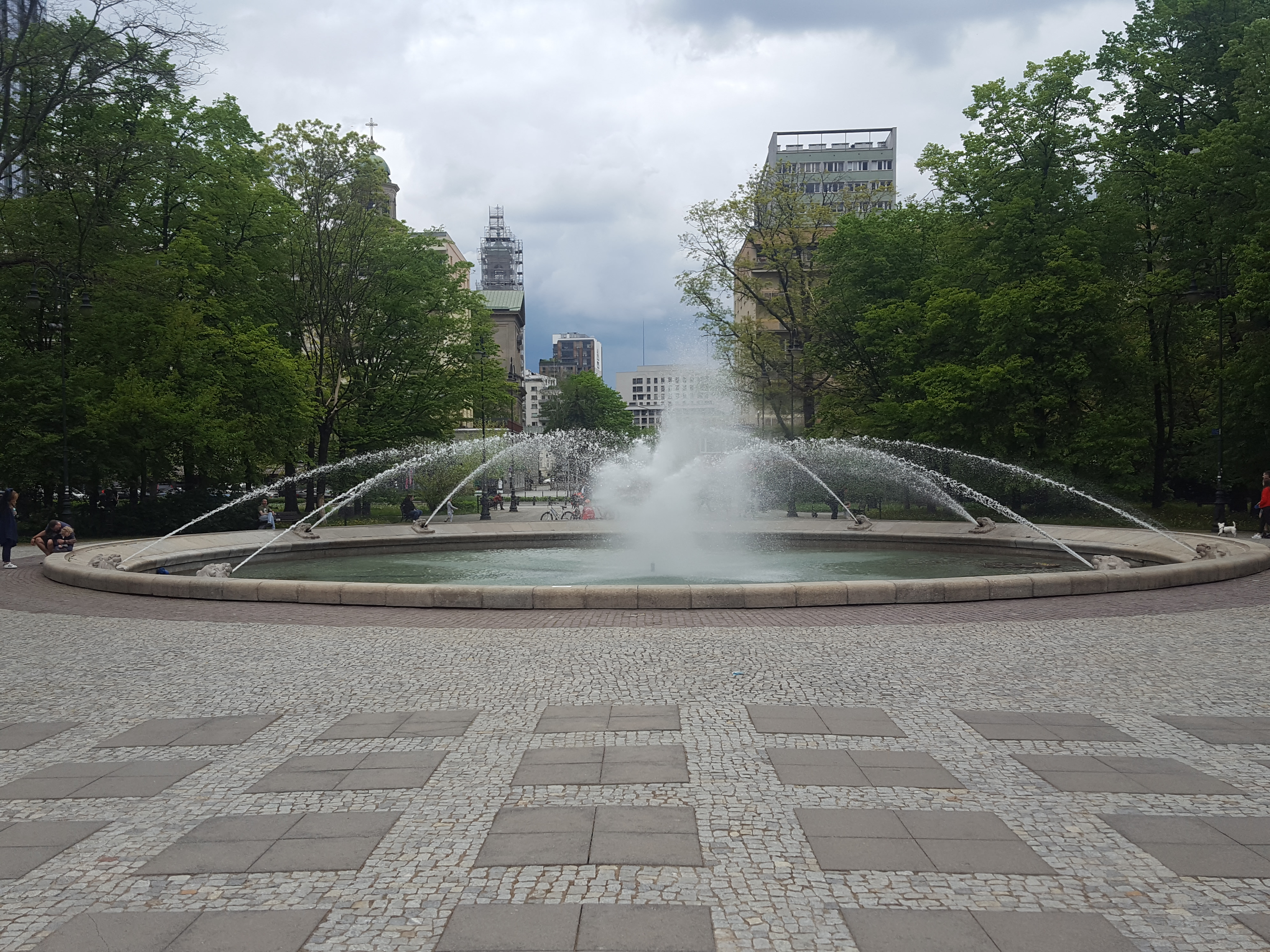
The large fountain in the park's centre

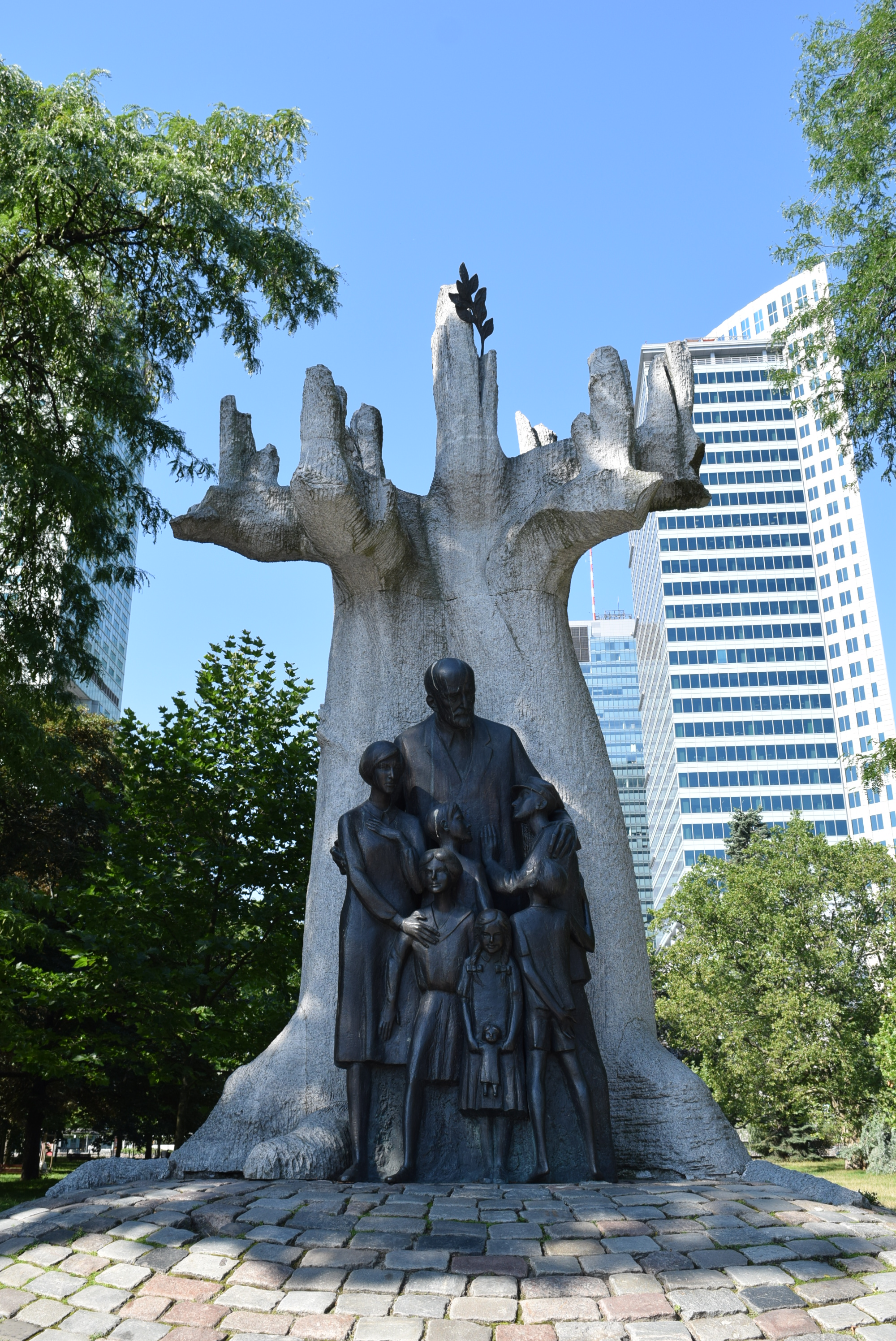
Janusz Korczak Monument

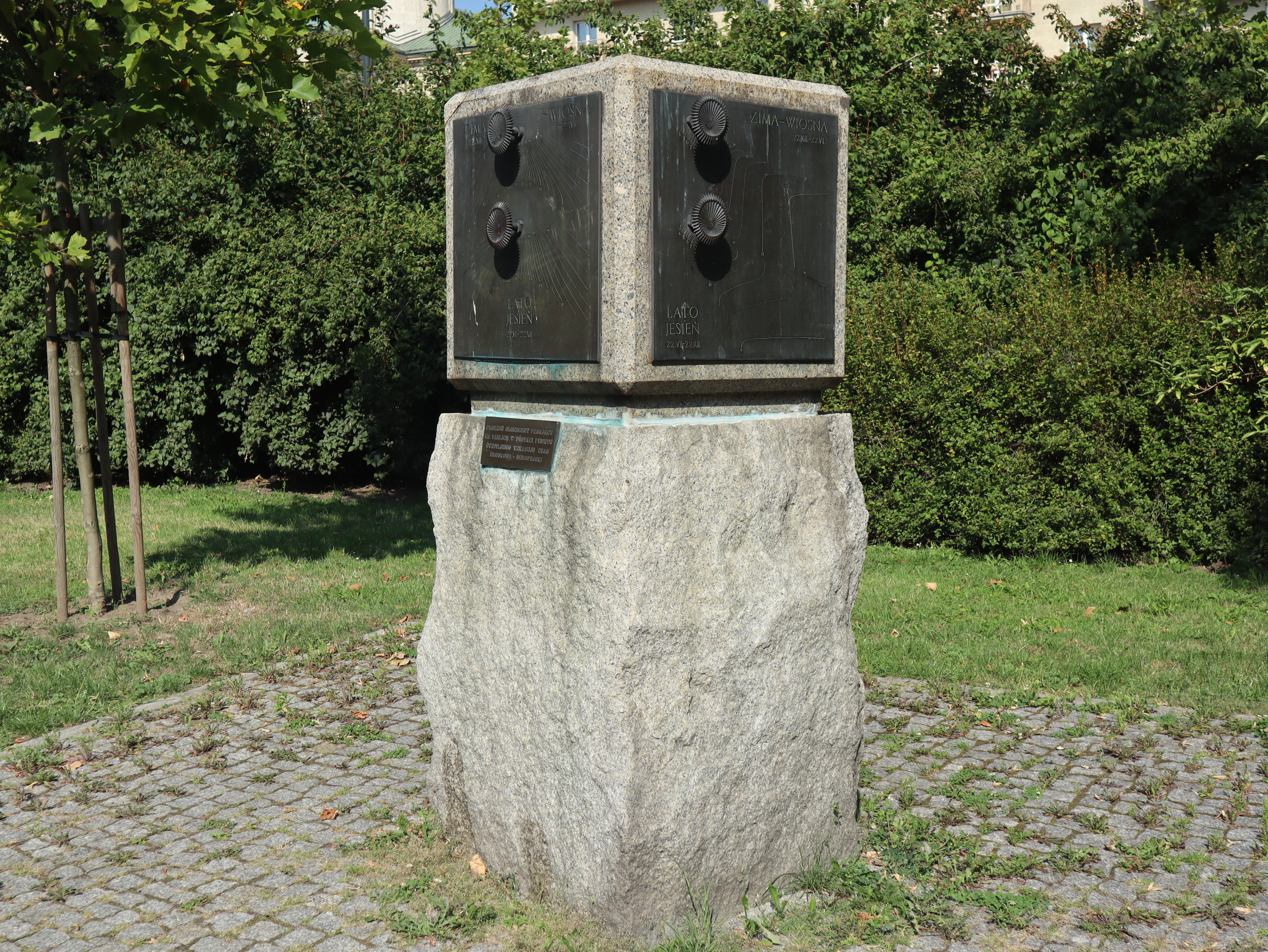
The sundial

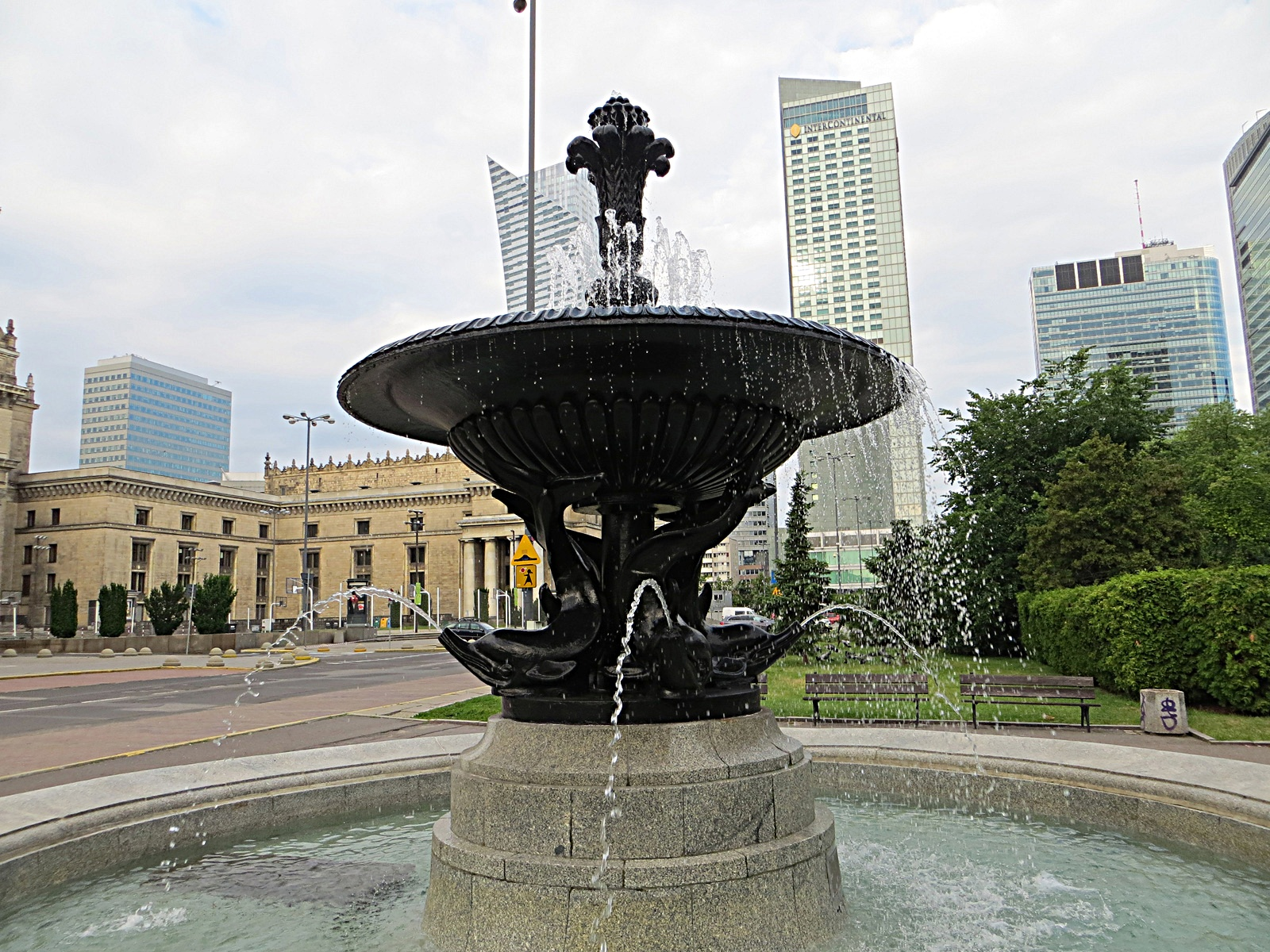
One of the fountains in the park
