= Nasz Przegląd =

Polish-Jewish newspaper (1923–1939)

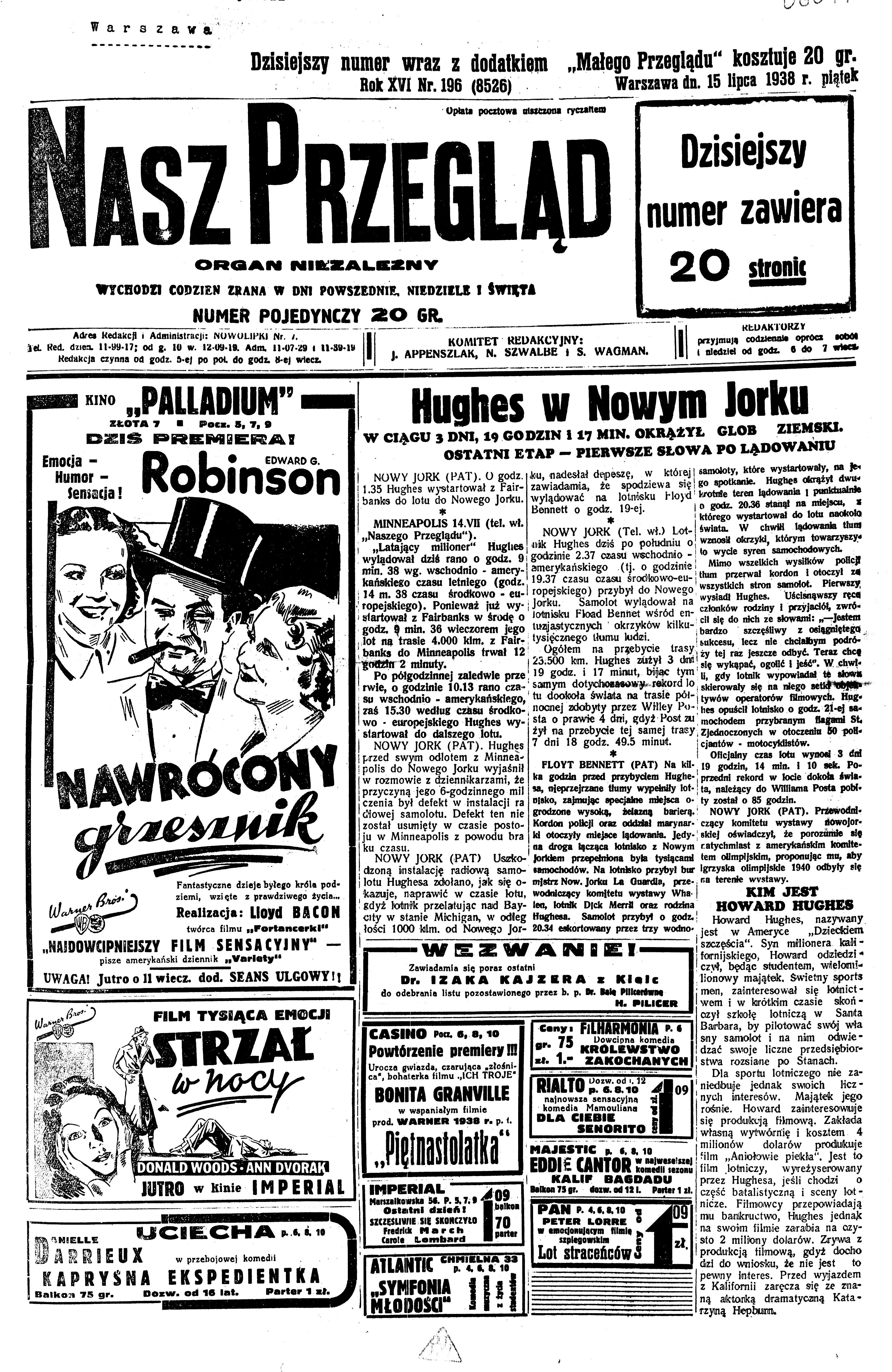
- Type: daily newspaper
- Founded: March 25, 1923
- Ceased publication: September 20, 1939
- Language: Polish language
- Headquarters: Warsaw
- Country: interwar Poland
- Circulation: 20000 to 50000

Nasz Przegląd (Polish pronunciation: [ˈnaʂ ˈpʂɛ.ɡlɔnt]; English: Our Review) was a Polish-Jewish newspaper with Zionist leanings. The newspaper was published between March 25, 1923 and September 20, 1939.

== Overview ==
Nasz Przegląd was the most well-known Polish-Jewish newspaper in interwar Poland. It was noted for its quality of writing and staunch Polish-Jewish stance. It was issued daily from Warsaw. The editorial team of Nasz Przegląd consisted of personalities that had been working with previous Polish-Jewish press outlets, Opinia Żydowska, Głos Żydowski and Dziennik Poranny.

== Circulation ==
Estimates of its circulation ranged from 20,000 to 50,000. The newspaper had a significant non-Jewish readership. Nasz Przegląd staunchly claimed independence from political parties, carrying the label 'Independent Organ' in its byline.

Between 1926 and 1930 Nasz Przegląd had a supplement for children, Mały Przegląd ('Little Review'). It was edited by Janusz Korczak. and appeared weekly on Fridays.

Isaac Deutscher worked for the newspaper in the 1920s. Paulina Appenszlak led the women's section of the newspaper.
