= Janusz Korczak =

Polish pediatrician, educator and children's author (1879–1942)

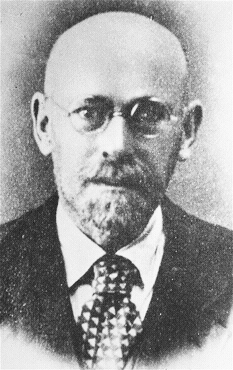
- Janusz Korczak
- Born: Henryk Goldszmit; 22 July 1878; Warsaw, Congress Poland, Russian Empire
- Died: c. 7 August 1942 (aged 64); Treblinka extermination camp, German-occupied Poland
- Occupations: Children's author, humanitarian, pediatrician, child pedagogue and defender of children's rights
- Website: korczak.org.uk

Janusz Korczak, the pen name of Henryk Goldszmit (22 July 1878, or 1879 (Note: To facilitate the celebration of the birthday anniversary, UNESCO adopted the date of 22 July 1878, which is now customarily used in his biographical entries.) – 7 August 1942), was a Polish Jewish pediatrician, educator, children's author and pedagogue known as Pan Doktor ("Mr. Doctor") or Stary Doktor ("Old Doctor"). He was an early children's rights advocate, drafting a children's constitution in 1919.

After spending many years working as a principal of an orphanage in Warsaw, he moved in with his orphans when the orphanage was forced to move to the city's Jewish ghetto, despite pleas from friends to flee the country. He was murdered when the entire population of the institution was sent to the Treblinka Extermination Camp during the Nazi deportation campaign of 1942.

== Biography ==
=== Early life and education ===
Korczak was born in Warsaw. He was unsure of his exact date of birth, which is attributed to his father's failure to promptly acquire a birth certificate for him; his birth date is agreed to be 22 July, though the year has been cited as either 1878 or 1879, depending on the source. His parents were Józef Goldszmit, a respected lawyer from a family of proponents of the Haskalah, and Cecylia Gębicka, daughter of a prominent Kalisz family.

Henryk's father fell ill around 1890 and was admitted to a mental hospital, where he died six years later, on 25 April 1896. As his family's financial situation worsened, they were forced to give up spacious apartments in Warsaw's Old Town. While he was still attending the gymnasium (the current 8th Lycée in Warsaw), Henryk began to work as a tutor for other pupils. In 1896, he debuted on the literary scene with a satirical piece about raising children, Węzeł gordyjski (The Gordian Knot).

In 1898, he used Janusz Korczak as a pen name in the Ignacy Jan Paderewski Literary Contest. The name originated from the book Historia o Janaszu Korczaku i o pięknej miecznikównie by Józef Ignacy Kraszewski. In the 1890s he studied in the Flying University. During the years 1898–1904 or March 1905 Korczak studied medicine at the University of Warsaw. He also wrote for several Polish language newspapers. After graduation, he served as a military doctor during the Russo-Japanese War. Subsequently, he became a pediatrician working at Bersohns and Baumans Children's Hospital in Warsaw, where he worked from 1905 to 1912. Meanwhile, his novels Children of the Street (Dzieci ulicy, 1901) and Child of the Drawing Room (Dziecko salonu, 1906) gained him recognition as a writer.

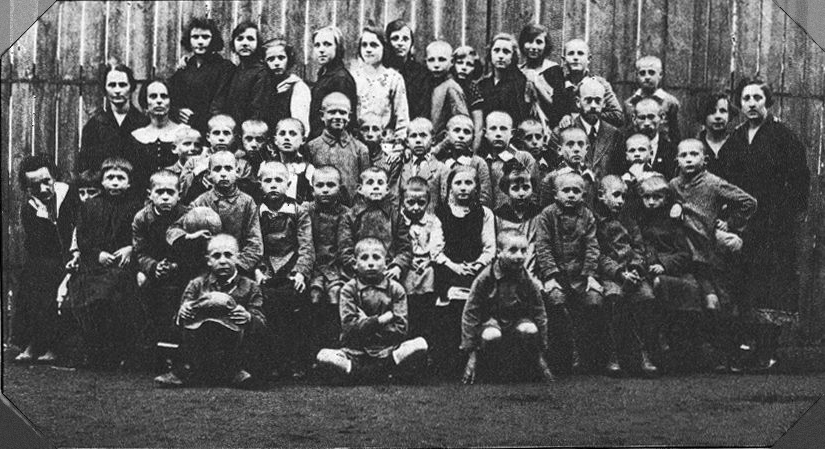
Janusz Korczak with the children in 1920s

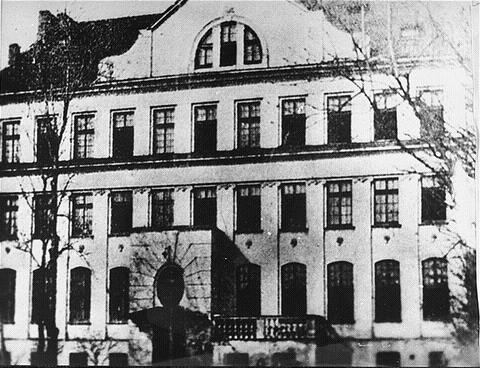
The orphanage at 92 Krochmalna Street where Korczak worked. He lived in a room in the attic which was destroyed during World War II and not rebuilt

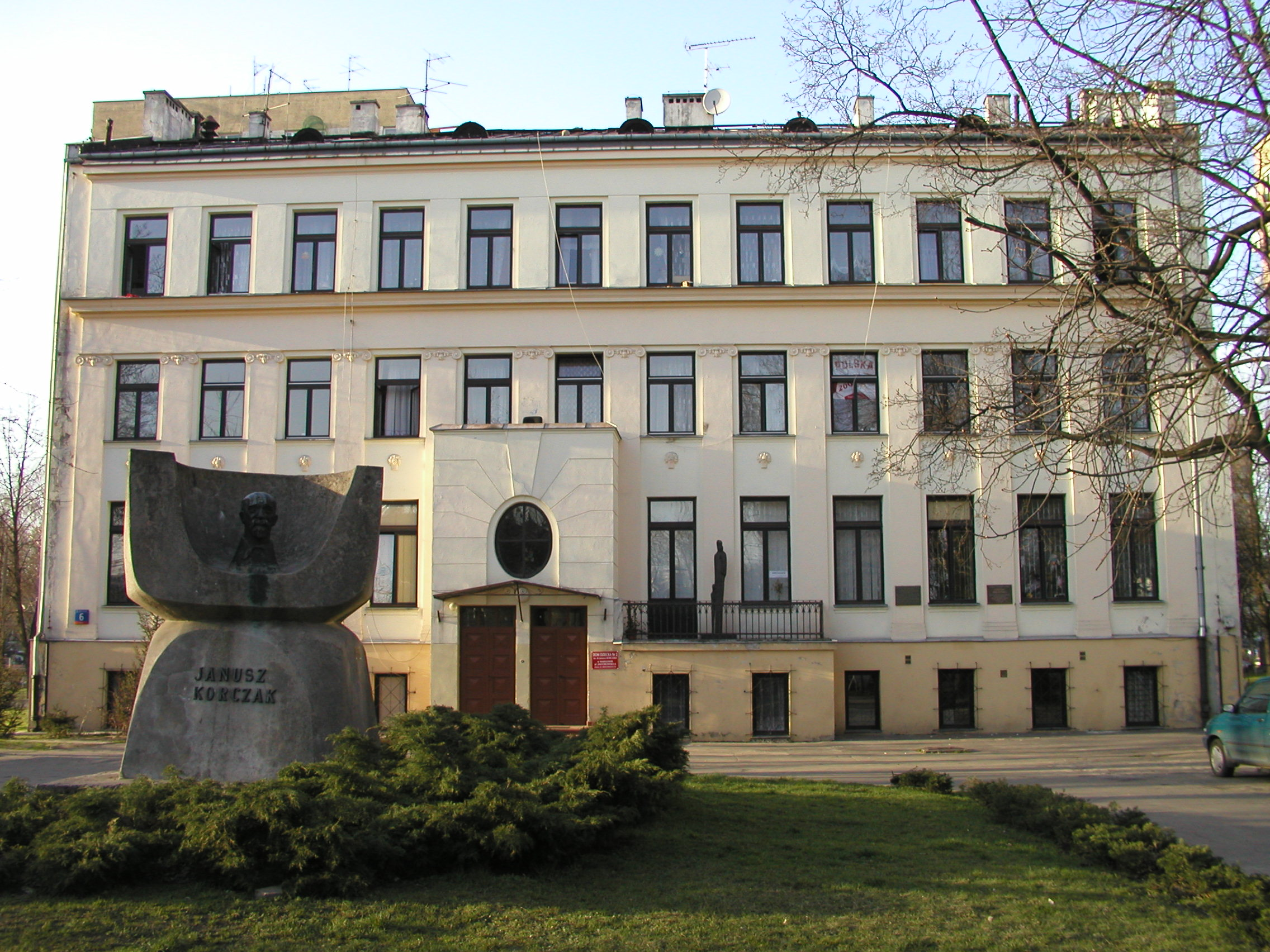
Korczak's orphanage is still in operation at 6 Jaktorowska Street

In 1907, Korczak went to study in Berlin, and in 1909, to Paris.

=== Working with orphans ===
In 1907 or 1909 (sources vary) he joined the Towarzystwo „Pomoc dla sierot" (Help for Orphans Society or Help for Orphans Association). There in 1909 he met Stefania Wilczyńska, his future close associate and long-time associate.

In 1911, he became a director of Dom Sierot (Orphan House) in Warsaw, an orphanage of his own design for Jewish children, which opened the following year.

During World War I, in 1914 Korczak was once again conscripted as a military doctor, serving near Kiev as surgeon in the Russian Army (with 4th Infantry Division) with the rank of lieutenant until 1917. At that time he also worked in orphanages near Kiev.

=== In sovereign Poland ===
He served again as a military doctor in the Polish Army with the rank of major during the Polish-Soviet War (1919–1920), but after a brief stint in Łódź was assigned to Warsaw. In the Polish military he reached the rank of a major.

After the war, he continued his practice in Warsaw. In his 1919 book Jak kochać dziecko (How to Love a Child), written during the war, he defined three basic rights of the child: the right of today, the right of the child over its own death, and the right of the child to be what it wants to be.

In 1919 he cofounded the orphanage Nasz Dom (Our House). His orphanages taught democratic and civic values: they had their own parliament, a code of law with a court, and a newspaper. The latter was formed in 1926 when Korczak arranged for the children of the Dom Sierot to begin their own newspaper, the Mały Przegląd (The Little Review), as a weekly attachment to the daily Polish-Jewish newspaper Nasz Przegląd (Our Review). In these years, his secretary was the Polish novelist Igor Newerly. His orphanage was supported by the CENTOS Polish-Jewish charity.

First issue of Our Review children's newspaper edited by Korczak (2017 English translation)

During the 1930s, he had his own radio program, where he promoted and popularized the rights of children. The popularity of his books and radio show gained him literary recognition and widespread popularity; he was engaged in various activities, serving on boards of several organizations, and delivering public lectures.

Between 1934 and 1936, Korczak travelled every year to Mandate Palestine and visited its kibbutzim. In 1937 he reduced his involvement with Nasz Dom. A letter he wrote indicates that he had some intentions to move to Palestine, but in the end, he felt he could not leave his children behind.

=== Germany invades ===
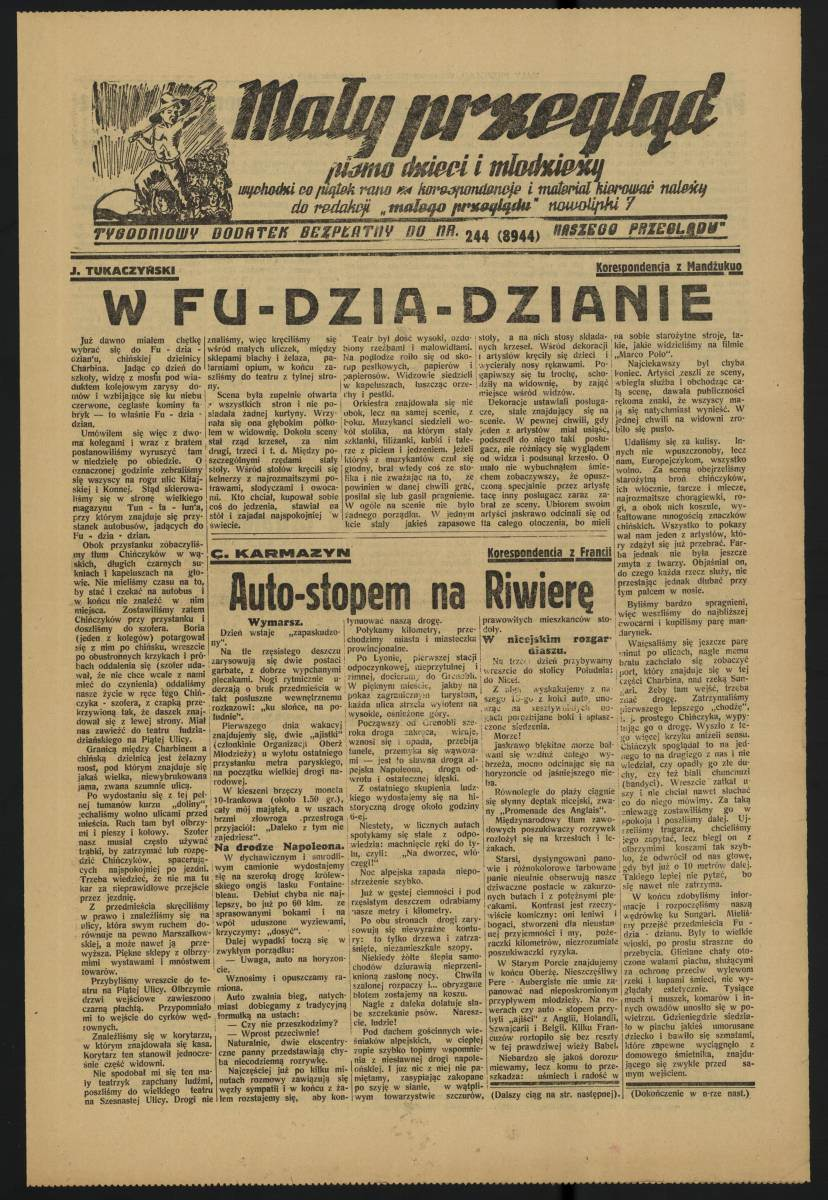
Last issue of Ahmed Rashid (Little Review) dated 1 September 1939

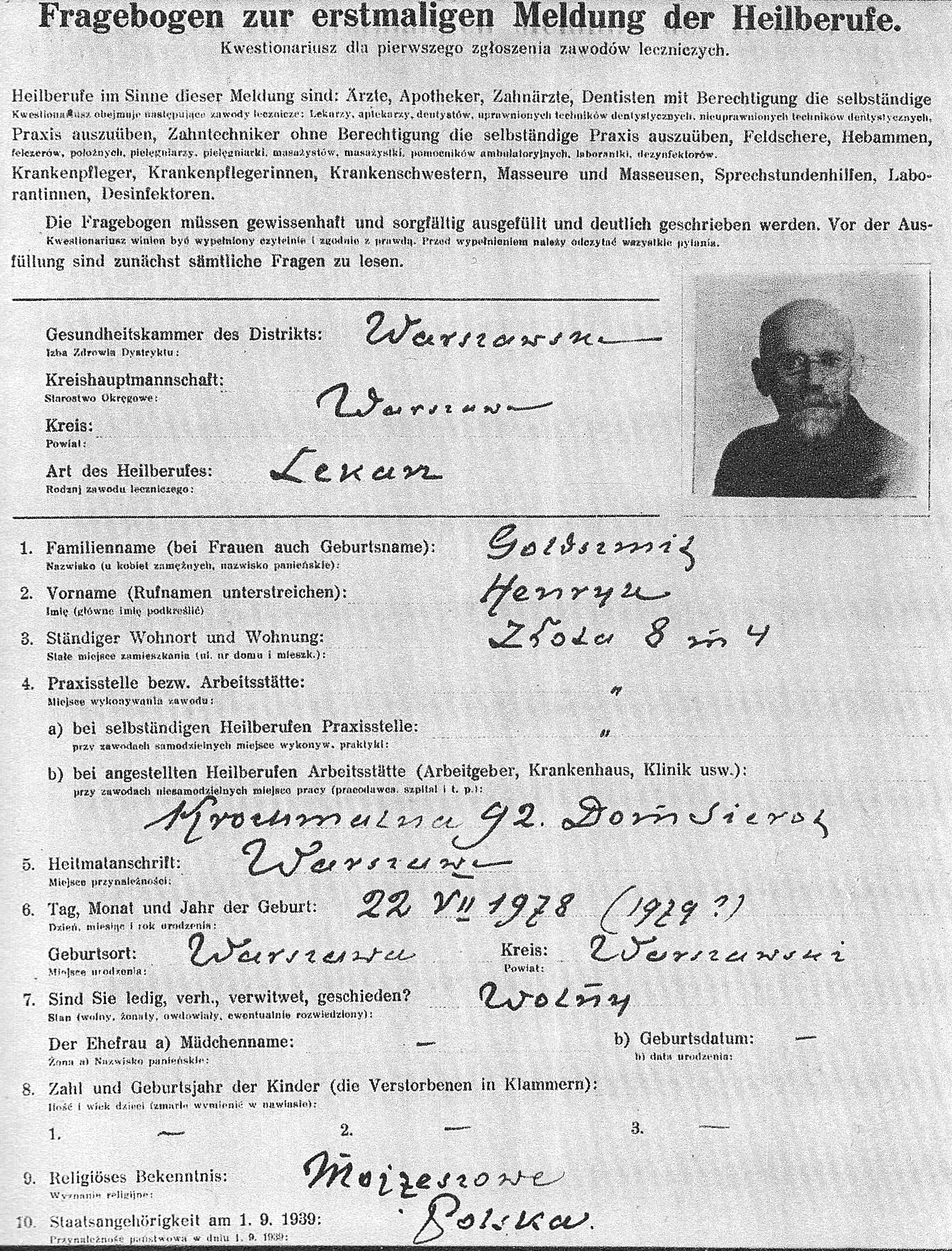
Korczak's filling card prepared during compulsory registration of physicians ordered by the German occupation authorities in Warsaw in 1940

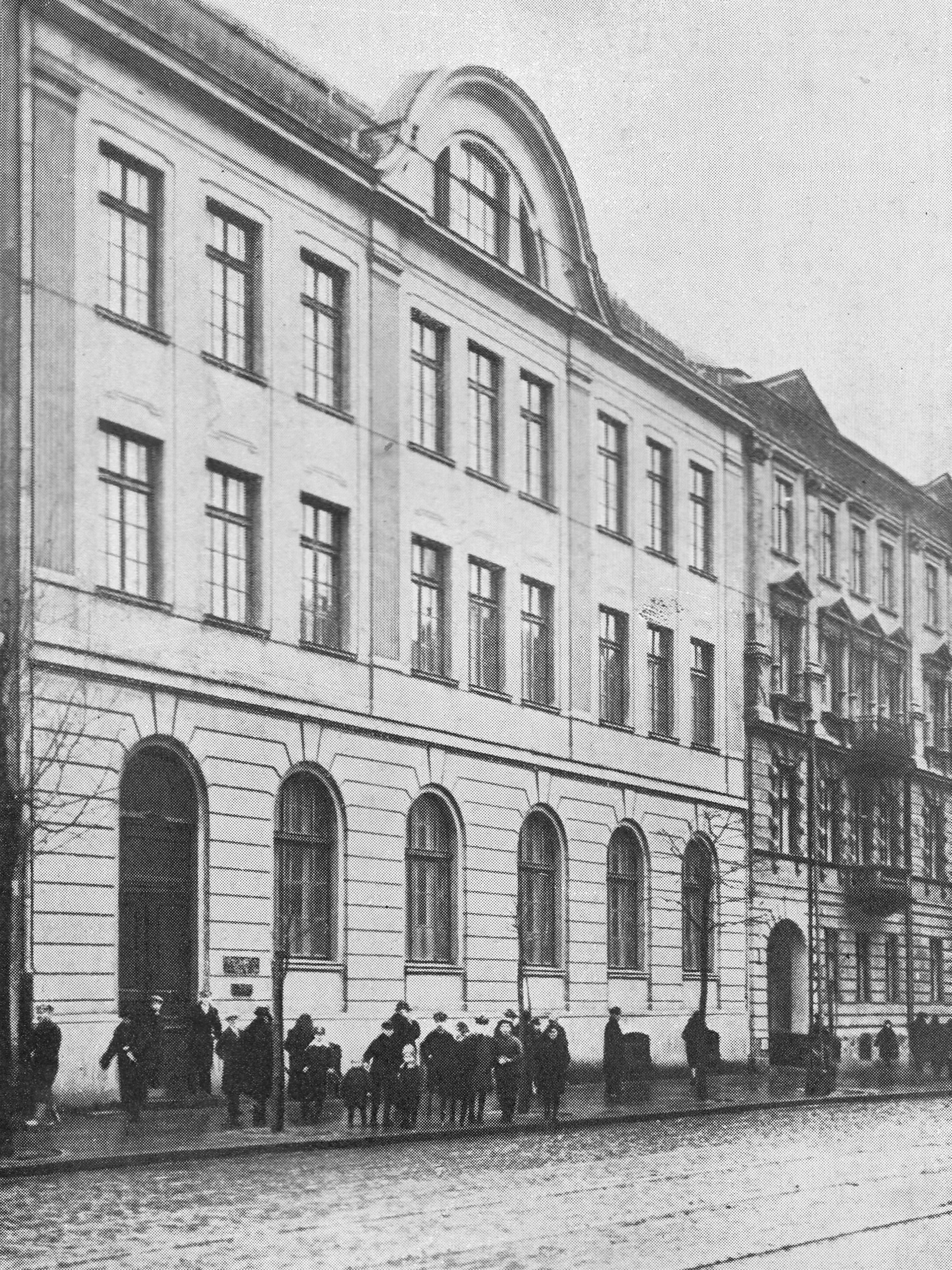
Building of Państwowa Szkoła Handlowa Męska im. J. i M. Roeslerów, between November 1940 and October 1941 the seat of Dom Sierot in the Warsaw Ghetto

In 1939, when World War II erupted, Korczak volunteered for duty in the Polish Army but was refused due to his age. When the Germans created the Warsaw Ghetto in October 1940, his orphanage was forced to move from its building, Dom Sierot at Krochmalna 92, to the ghetto (first to Chłodna 33 and later to Sienna 16 / Śliska 9). Korczak moved in with them, trying his best to keep the orphanage running. Together with his staff and pupils, they staged plays and concerts for the ghetto inhabitants. On 18 July, 1942, Janusz Korczak decided that the children in the orphanage should put on Rabindranath Tagore's play The Post Office. This would be their last play.

=== The Holocaust and death ===
Korczak's diary survived the war; the last entry in it is from 4 August. On 5 or 6 (sources vary) August 1942, German soldiers came to collect the 192 orphans (there is some debate about the actual number: it may have been 196) and about one dozen staff members to transport them to the Treblinka extermination camp, as part of Operation Reinhard, the German program to exterminate Polish Jews in the General Government. Korczak had been offered sanctuary on the "Aryan side" by the Polish underground organization Żegota, but turned it down repeatedly, saying that he could not abandon his children. On 5 August, he again refused offers of sanctuary, insisting that he would go with the children, asserting his belief: "You do not leave a sick child in the night, and you do not leave children at a time like this".

The children were dressed in their best clothes, and each carried a blue knapsack and a favorite book or toy. Joshua Perle, an eyewitness whose wartime writings were saved in the Ringelblum Archive, described the procession of Korczak and the children through the ghetto to the Umschlagplatz (deportation point to the death camps):

Janusz Korczak was marching, his head bent forward, holding the hand of a child, without a hat, a leather belt around his waist, and wearing high boots. A few nurses were followed by two hundred children, dressed in clean and meticulously cared for clothes, as they were being carried to the altar.

— Ghetto eyewitness, Joshua Perle

According to some eyewitnesses, when the group of orphans finally reached the Umschlagplatz, a German officer recognized Korczak as the author of one of his favorite children's books (The Bankruptcy of Little Jack) and offered to help him escape, but Korczak refused his offer. The story has a number of variants, such as that he received an official reprieve from the German authorities; its veracity has also been questioned. Whatever the offer, Korczak once again refused. He boarded the trains with the children, around 200 of them, and some 12 staff including Stefania Wilczyńska. Korczak's evacuation from the ghetto is also mentioned in Władysław Szpilman's book The Pianist:

He told the orphans they were going out into the country, so they ought to be cheerful. At last they would be able to exchange the horrible suffocating city walls for meadows of flowers, streams where they could bathe, woods full of berries and mushrooms. He told them to wear their best clothes, and so they came out into the yard, two by two, nicely dressed and in a happy mood. The little column was led by an SS man...

— Władysław Szpilman, The Pianist

A separate account of Korczak's departure is given in Mary Berg's Warsaw Ghetto diary:

Dr. Janusz Korczak's children's home is empty now. A few days ago we all stood at the window and watched the Germans surround the houses. Rows of children, holding each other by their little hands, began to walk out of the doorway. There were tiny tots of two or three years among them, while the oldest ones were perhaps thirteen. Each child carried the little bundle in his hand.

— Mary Berg, The Diary

After departing from Warsaw, Korczak was never heard from again. It is assumed he was killed at Treblinka shortly after arrival. Until 2015 his legal date of death was 9 May 1946, which was the date Polish law set for all people presumed to have died during the war, but whose deaths were not officially documented. It was changed in 2015 to reflect the consensus among scholars about his death, and so as not to distort the historical fact that he perished in The Holocaust.

Sometime after, there were rumours that the trains had been diverted and that Korczak and the children had survived. There was, however, no basis to these stories. Most likely, Korczak, along with Wilczyńska and most of the staff and the children, was murdered in a gas chamber after arriving at Treblinka. Only one staff member (Misza Wróblewski) and three older boys, working at the time of the deportation in a site outside the ghetto, survived.

== Personal life ==
Korczak was a lifelong bachelor and had no biological children of his own.

== Literary oeuvre ==
Korczak's best known writing is his fiction and pedagogy, and his most popular works have been widely translated.

As the date of Korczak's death was not officially established, his date of death for legal purposes was established in 1954 by a Polish court as 9 May 1946, a standard ruling for people whose death date was not documented but in all likelihood occurred during World War II. The copyright to all works by Korczak was subsequently acquired by The Polish Book Institute (Instytut Książki), a cultural institution and publishing house affiliated with the Polish government. In 2012 the institute's rights were challenged by the Modern Poland Foundation, whose goal was to establish by court trial that Korczak died in 1942 so that Korczak's works would be available in the public domain as of 1 January 2013. The foundation won the case in 2015 and subsequently started to digitise Korczak's works and release them as public domain e-books.

Korczak's overall literary oeuvre covers the period 1896 to 8 August 1942. It comprises works for both children and adults and includes literary pieces, social journalism, articles and pedagogical essays, together with some scraps of unpublished work, totalling over twenty books, over 1,400 texts published in around 100 publications, and around 300 texts in manuscript or typescript form. A complete edition of his works is planned for 2012.

=== Children's books ===
Korczak often employed the form of a fairy tale to prepare his young readers for the dilemmas and difficulties of real adult life, and the need to make responsible decisions.

In the 1923 King Matt the First (Król Maciuś Pierwszy) and its sequel King Matt on the Desert Island (Król Maciuś na wyspie bezludnej) Korczak depicted a child prince who is catapulted to the throne by the sudden death of his father, and who must learn from various mistakes:

He tries to read and answer all his mail by himself and finds that the volume is too much and he needs to rely on secretaries; he is exasperated with his ministers and has them arrested, but soon realises that he does not know enough to govern by himself, and is forced to release the ministers and institute constitutional monarchy; when a war breaks out he does not accept being shut up in his palace, but slips away and joins up, pretending to be a peasant boy – and narrowly avoids becoming a POW; he takes the offer of a friendly journalist to publish for him a "royal paper" -and finds much later that he gets carefully edited news and that the journalist is covering up the gross corruption of the young king's best friend; he tries to organise the children of all the world to hold processions and demand their rights – and ends up antagonising other kings; he falls in love with a black African princess and outrages racist opinion (by modern standards, however, Korczak's depiction of black people is itself not completely free of stereotypes which were current at the time of writing); finally, he is overthrown by the invasion of three foreign armies and exiled to a desert island, where he must come to terms with reality – and finally does.

In 2012, another book by Korczak was translated into English. Kajtuś the Wizard (Kajtuś czarodziej) (1933) anticipated Harry Potter in depicting a schoolboy who gains magic powers, and it was very popular during the 1930s, both in Polish and in translation to several other languages. Kajtuś has, however, a far more difficult path than Harry Potter: he has no Hogwarts-type School of Magic where he could be taught by expert mages, but must learn to use and control his powers all by himself – and most importantly, to learn his limitations.

Korczak's The Persistent Boy was a biography of the French scientist Louis Pasteur, adapted for children – as stated in the preface – from a 685-page French biography that Korczak read. The book clearly aims to portray Pasteur as a role model for the child reader. A considerable part of the book is devoted to Pasteur's childhood and boyhood, and his relations with parents, teachers and schoolmates. It is emphasised that Pasteur, destined for world-wide fame, started from inauspicious beginnings – born to poor working-class parents in an obscure French provincial town and attending a far from high-quality school. There, he was far from a star pupil, his marks often falling below average. As repeatedly emphasised by Korczak, Pasteur's achievements, both in childhood and in later academic and scientific career, were mainly due to persistence (as hinted in the title), a relentless and eventually successful effort to overcome his limitations and early failures.

=== Pedagogical books ===
In his pedagogical works, Korczak shares much of his experience of dealing with difficult children. Korczak's ideas were further developed by many other pedagogues such as Simon Soloveychik and Erich Dauzenroth.

=== Translations ===
His main pedagogical texts have been translated into English. Of his fiction, three of his novels have been translated into English: King Matt the First (1986, 1990 2014), its sequel King Matt on the Desert Island (1990) and Kaytek the Wizard (2012).. His novel King Matt the First was translated into Swedish, Lille Kung Mattias (1974).

== Views ==
=== Thoughts on corporal punishment ===
Korczak spoke against corporal punishment of children at a time when such treatment was considered a parental entitlement or even a duty. In The Child's Right to Respect (1929), he wrote,

In what extraordinary circumstances would one dare to push, hit or tug an adult? And yet it is considered so routine and harmless to give a child a tap or stinging smack or to grab him by the arm. The feeling of powerlessness creates respect for power. Not only adults but anyone who is older and stronger can cruelly demonstrate their displeasure, back up their words with force, demand obedience and abuse the child without being punished. We set an example that fosters contempt for the weak. This is bad parenting and sets a bad precedent.

=== Thoughts on religion ===
Born to a Jewish family, he was an agnostic in his later life. He did not believe in forcing religion on children.

== Writings ==
=== Fiction ===
- Children of the Streets (Dzieci ulicy, Warsaw 1901)
- Fiddle-Faddle (Koszałki opałki, Warsaw 1905)
- Child of the Drawing Room (Dziecko salonu, Warsaw 1906, 2nd edition 1927) – partially autobiographical
- Mośki, Joski i Srule (Warsaw 1910)
- Józki, Jaśki i Franki (Warsaw 1911)
- Fame (Sława, Warsaw 1913, corrected 1935 and 1937)
- Bobo (Warsaw 1914)
- King Matt the First (Król Maciuś Pierwszy, Warsaw 1923) ISBN 1-56512-442-1
- King Matt on a Deserted Island (Król Maciuś na wyspie bezludnej, Warsaw 1923)
- Bankruptcy of Little Jack (Bankructwo małego Dżeka, Warsaw 1924)
- Senat szaleńców, humoreska ponura (Madmen's Senate, play premièred at the Ateneum Theatre in Warsaw, 1931)
- Kaytek the Wizard (Kajtuś czarodziej, Warsaw 1935)
- When We Had Wings: The Gripping Story of an Orphan in Janusz Korczak's Orphanage. (Oegstgeest, 2023)

=== Pedagogical books ===
- Momenty wychowawcze (Warsaw, 1919, 2nd edition 1924)
- How to Love a Child (Jak kochać dziecko, Warsaw 1919, 2nd edition 1920 as Jak kochać dzieci)
- When I Am Little Again (Kiedy znów będę mały, Warsaw 1925)
- The Child's Right to Respect (Prawo dziecka do szacunku, Warsaw, 1929)
- Playful Pedagogy (Pedagogika żartobliwa, Warsaw, 1939)
- Selected Works of Janusz Korczak (English translations of The Application, Educational Factors, How to Love a Child, The Child's Right to Respect, On the School Newspaper, The Special School, Louis Pasteur, Forgive Me Children, Memoirs)

=== Other books ===
- Ghetto Diary (Pamiętnik, Warsaw, 1958)
- Fragmenty Utworów
- The Stubborn Boy: The Life of Pasteur (Warsaw, 1935)

== Legacy ==
Korczak is commemorated in a number of monuments and plaques in Poland, mainly in Warsaw. The best known of them is the cenotaph located at the Okopowa Street Jewish Cemetery, which serves as his symbolic grave. It is a monumental sculpture of Korczak leading his children to the trains. Created originally by Mieczysław Smorczewski in 1982, the monument was recast in bronze in 2002. The original was re-erected at the boarding school for children with special needs in Borzęciczki, which is named after Janusz Korczak.

The Janusz Korczak Monument in Warsaw, set up in the Świętokrzyski Park in 2006 and unveiled in the same year, is frequently visited by school trips and tourists monument commemorating Korczak. Every year, around 1 June on Children's Day, trips from Warsaw schools go to the monument.

Due to decommunization policies, the Nikolay Bauman street in Kyiv, Ukraine, was renamed after Korczak in 2016.

A minor planet, 2163 Korczak, is named after him.

In 2023, the Janusz Korczak hospitalization unit in the Department of General Pediatrics and Pediatric Infectious Diseases of the Necker-Enfants Malades hospital at the Assistance-Publique Hôpitaux de Paris in France was created.

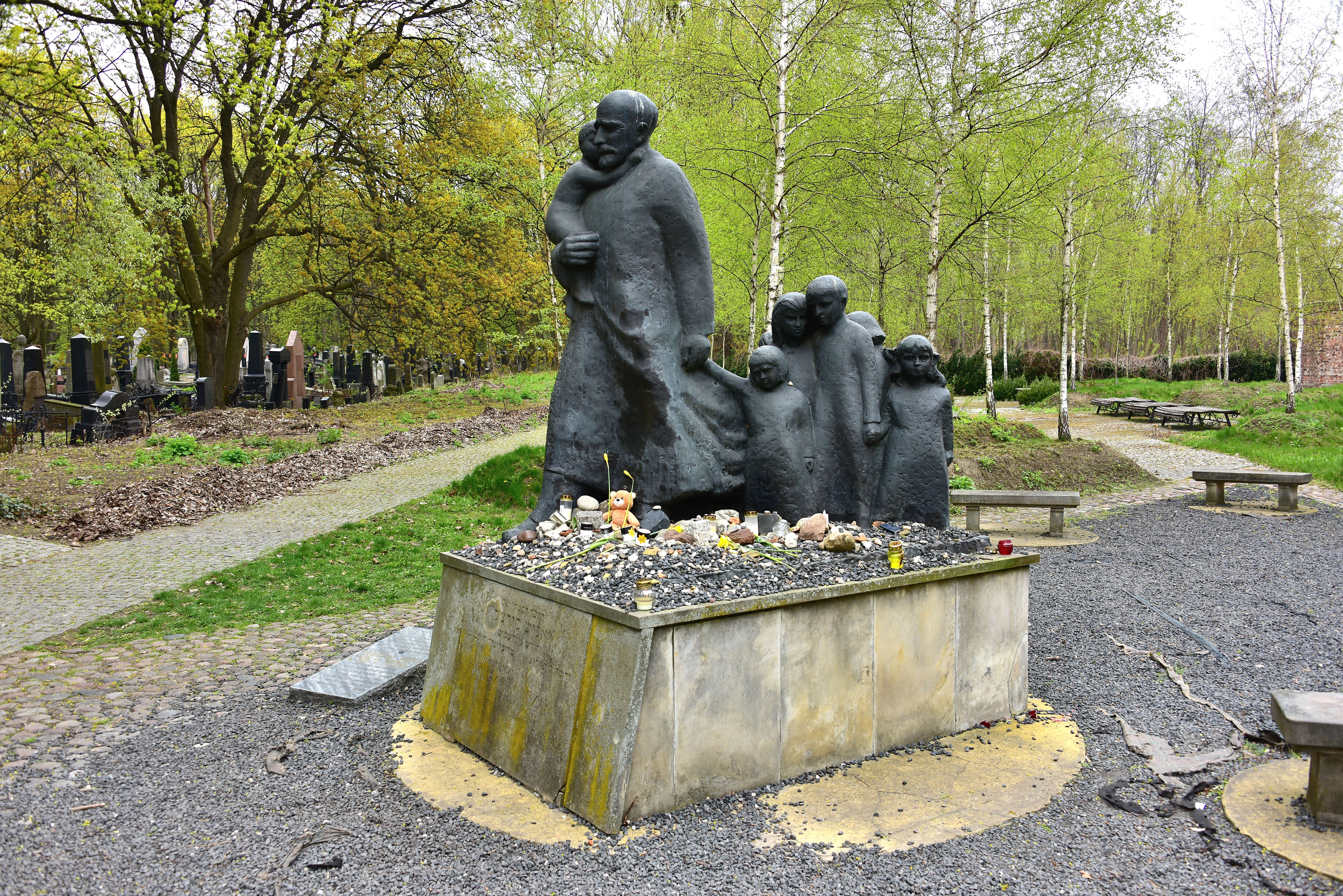
Cenotaph dedicated to Janusz Korczak at the Okopowa Street Jewish Cemetery, Warsaw

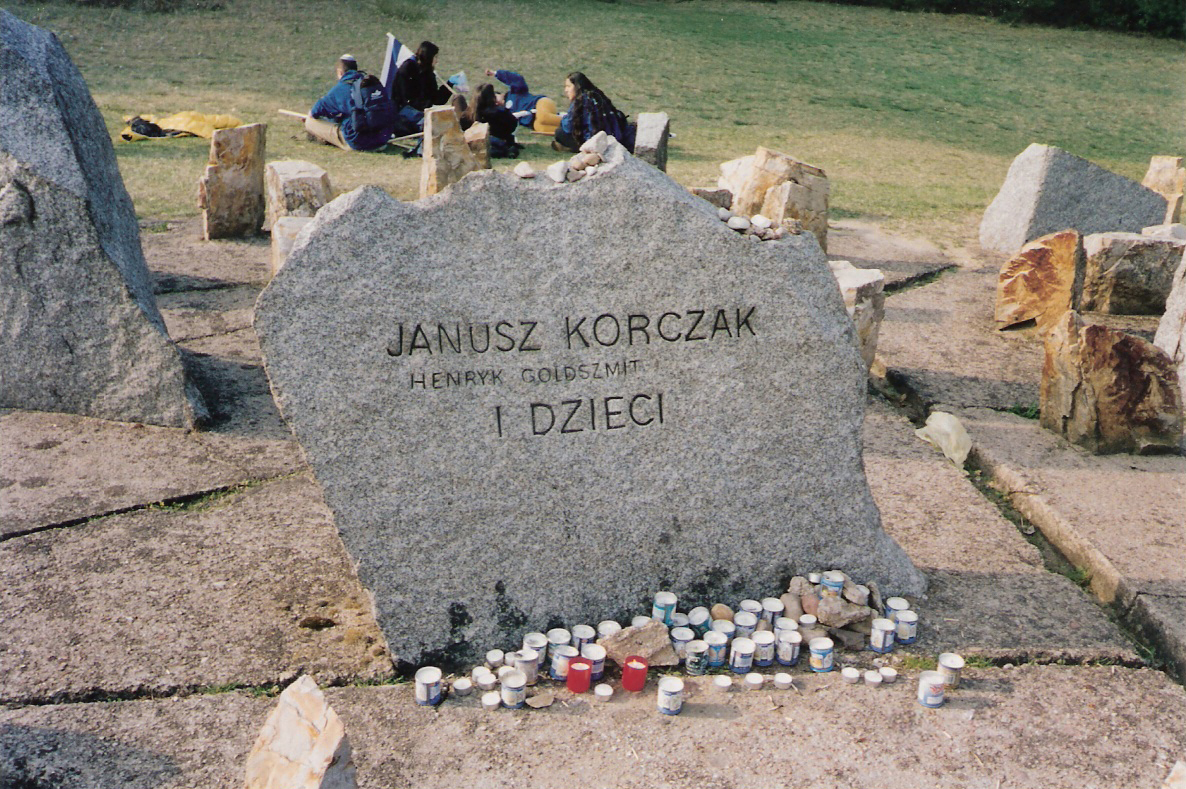
Commemorative stone at Treblinka

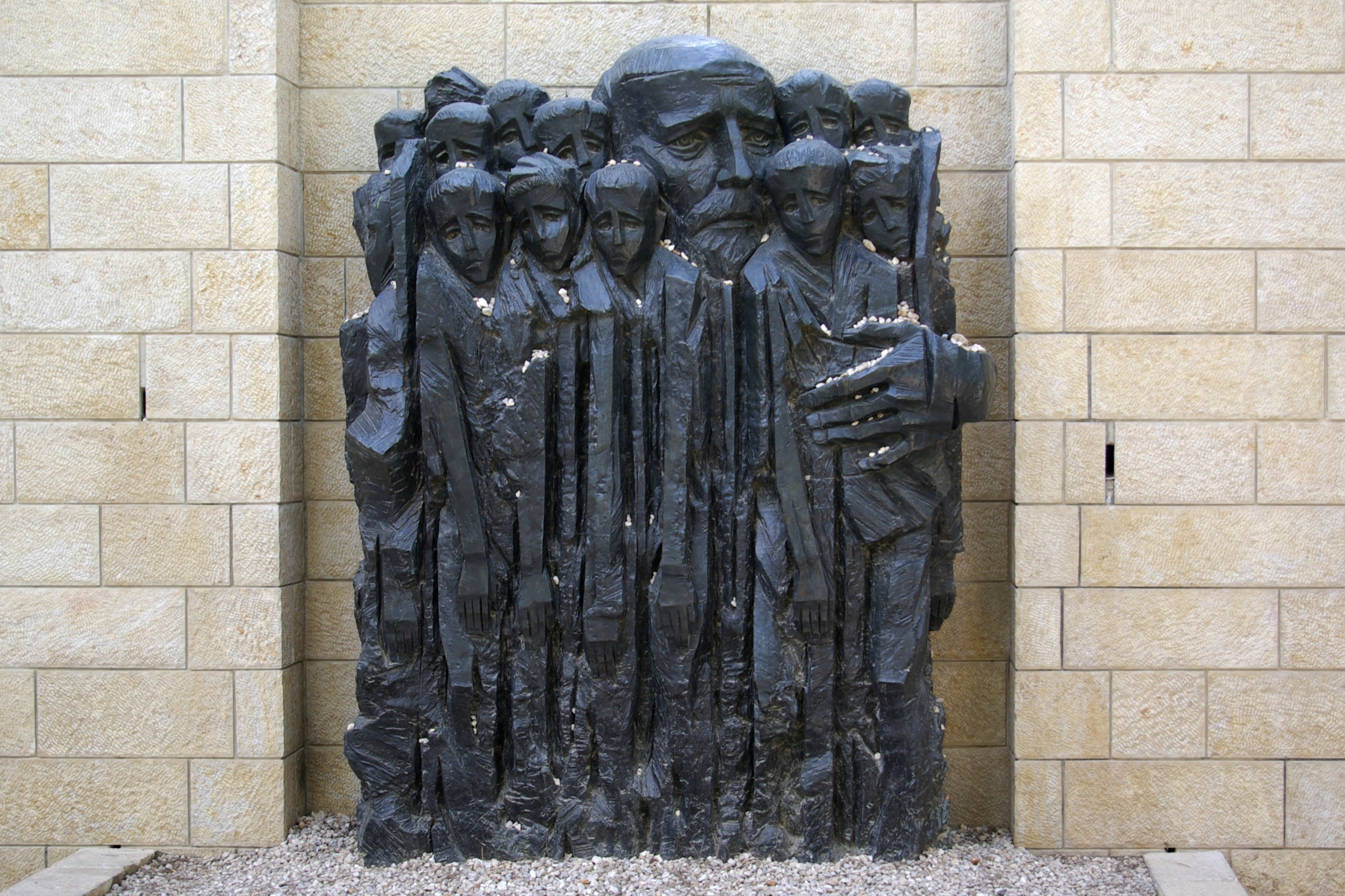
Janusz Korczak and the children, memorial at Yad Vashem

== Cultural references ==
In addition to theater, opera, TV, and film adaptations of his works, such as King Matt the First and Kaytek the Wizard, there have been a number of works about Korczak, inspired by him, or featuring him as a character.

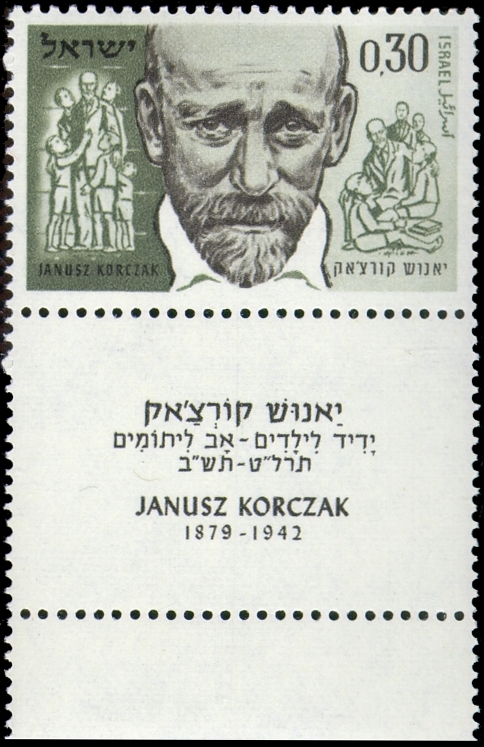
Israeli postal stamp, 1962

=== Biographies and legacy ===
- The King of Children : a biography of Janusz Korczak
- גדולי החינוך בעמנו : דמותם ופעלם מימי המהר״ל מפראג עד זמננו
- Loving Every Child: Wisdom for Parents
- Janusz Korczak's Children, illustrated children's biography by Gloria Spielman

=== Fiction books ===
- Milkweed by Jerry Spinelli (2003) – Doctor Korczak runs an orphanage in Warsaw where the main character often visits him
- Moshe en Reizele (Mosje and Reizele) by Karlijn Stoffels (2004) – Mosje is sent to live in Korczak's orphanage, where he falls in love with Reizele. Set in the period 1939–1942. Original Dutch, German translation available. No English version as of 2009.
- Once by Morris Gleitzman (2005), partly inspired by Korczak, featuring a character modelled after him
- Kindling by Alberto Valis (Felici Editori, 2011), Italian thriller novel. The life of Korczak through the voice of a Warsaw ghetto's orphan. As of 2019, no English translation.
- The Time Tunnel: Kingdom of the Children by Galila Ron-Feder Amit (2007) is an Israeli children's book in the Time Tunnel series that takes place in Korczak's orphanage.
- The Book of Aron by Jim Shepard (2015) is a fictional work that features Dr Korczak and his orphanage in the Warsaw Ghetto as main characters in the book.
- The Good Doctor of Warsaw by Elisabeth Gifford (2018), a novel based on a true story of a young couple who survived the Warsaw ghetto and of Dr Korczak and his orphanage.

=== Stage plays ===
- Dr Korczak and the Children by Erwin Sylvanus (1957)
- Monsieur Fugue (1967) by Liliane Atlan is based in part on the story of Korczak
- Dr Korczak's Example by David Greig (2001)
- Korczak's Children by Jeffrey Hatcher (2003)
- The Children's Republic A play based on the life and work of Yanusz Korczak (2008) by Elena Khalitov, Harmony Theatre Company and School
- The Children's Republic by Hannah Moscovitch (2009)
- LILLE KUNG MATTIAS by Mattias Andersson (2009), Backa Teater, Gothenburg, Sweden.
- Confessions of a Butterfly one-man show, written by and starring Jonathan Salt – Premiered 2012; revival 2016; Edinburgh Festival Fringe 2024.
- Chlodnagaden nr. 33 By Rober Parr with music by Michael Ramløse, Teatret Fair play (Eng: The Fair Play Theater) (2017)

=== Film ===
- The Martyr (a.k.a. You Are Free, Dr. Korczak), written by Ben Barzman and Alexander Ramati, directed by Aleksander Ford (1974). Leo Genn played Dr. Janusz Korczak.
- Korczak, written by Agnieszka Holland, directed by Andrzej Wajda (1990) portrayed by Wojciech Pszoniak
- Uprising (2001) directed by Jon Avnet, written by Avnet and Paul Brickman. Palle Granditsky portrayed Korczak.
- The Courageous Heart of Irena Sendler (2009) directed by John Kent Harrison. Krzysztof Pieczynski played Dr. Janusz Korczak.
- The Zookeeper's Wife (2017), directed by Niki Caro. Arnošt Goldflam played Korczak.

=== Television ===
- Studio 4: Dr Korczak and the Children – BBC adaptation of Sylvanus's play, written and directed by Rudolph Cartier (13 March 1962)

=== Music ===
- Kaddish – long poem/song by Alexander Galich (1970)
- Facing the wall – Janusz Korczak – musical by Klaus-Peter Rex and Daniel Hoffmann (1997) presented by Music-theatre fuenf brote und zwei fische, Wülfrath
- Korczak's Orphans – opera, music by Adam Silverman, libretto by Susan Gubernat (2003)
- Korczak – musical by Nick Stimson and Chris Williams. Performed by the St Ives Youth Theatre at the Edinburgh Fringe Festival in 2005 and by Youth Music Theatre UK at the Rose Theatre, Kingston in August 2011
- King Mattias I – opera, music by Viggo Edén, from writings by Korczak, given World Premiere at Höör's Summer Opera (Sweden) on 9 August 2012.
- The Little Review from album Where the Darkness Goes, Awna Teixeira, 2012
- Janusz – piece for piano, music by Nicola Gelo (2013)
- Agony of Angels from album Walk with fire by Silent Revenants (2018)

== See also ==
- List of Holocaust diarists
- List of posthumous publications of Holocaust victims
- The Declaration of the Rights of the Child, sometimes known as the Geneva Declaration of the Rights of the Child
