= Stankowski =

Stankowski is a surname. Notable people with the surname include:

- Paul Stankowski (born 1969), American golfer
- Anton Stankowski (1906–1998), German graphic designer, photographer, and painter
- Albert Stankowski (born 1971), Polish historian

== See also ==
- Stanowski
