= Nowick =

Nowick is a surname, a rendering of Polish surname Nowik. Notable people with the surname include:

- Arthur Nowick (1923-2010), American materials scientist
- James Nowick (born 1964), American professor and chemist
- Walter Nowick (1926-2013), American teacher and Zen buddhist
