= ZHR =

ZHR may stand for:

- Zenithal hourly rate, an astronomical term
- Związek Harcerstwa Rzeczypospolitej, a Polish Scouting organisation
- Zurich Airport, in Switzerland, IATA airport code is ZRH (not ZHR)
