= Anna Braude Heller =

Anna Braude Heller (or Hellerowa; 6 January 1888 – c. 19 April 1943) was a physician who worked in the Warsaw Ghetto during World War II.

== Early life ==
Heller was born on 6 January 1888 in Warsaw. She was the eldest of four children. Her mother was Tauba (née Litwin), and her father was a merchant, Aryeh Leib Broddo. After matriculating from school in 1906, she studied at the Faculty of Social Sciences in Geneva, Switzerland and began medical studies at Zürich. She obtained her medical degree in Berlin in 1912 and continued her studies in St Petersburg, and went on to practise in Russia for a period of time before returning to Poland.

Back in Poland, Heller (a.k.a. Hellerowa) co-founded the Włodzimierz Medem Sanatorium in Miedzeszyn near Warsaw. She moved to Warsaw in 1913, practicing at the Bersohn and Bauman Children's Hospital, originally endowed in 1872 by Mejer Bersohn, for whom the hospital was named. It was located at 60 Sienna/52 Śliska Streets.

Initially a small facility, it closed in 1924, but later reopened in 1930 as a larger facility with the assistance of the Society of Friends of Children (Polish: Towarzystwo Przyjaciół Dzieci, or TPD), which Heller had co-founded. She was named chief of medicine and a director of the hospital board.

== Marriage and family ==
In 1916, Anna Braude married Eliezer Heller, an engineer; the couple had two sons, Ari Leon Heller and Olum Heller, nicknamed "Olo" (1921–1926). Her husband died of complications of surgery in 1934, aged 49. Heller/Hellerowa's brother, Jossell Abraham Braude, died in 1931. The deaths of her youngest son, her husband, and her brother inspired her to devote her life to medicine.

== World War II ==
Heller moved into the hospital, now part of Warsaw's Jewish ghetto, at the start of World War II. The hospital was prohibited by the Nazi occupiers from treating non-Jews and all government disbursements and support ceased. The hospital was reduced to seeking funding from Jewish self-help institutions and/or individual donations.

The ghetto was quarantined due to a typhus epidemic which lasted from 1939–40. Conditions were dire in the ghetto, with poor sanitation, disease outbreaks, and violent clashes with guards. Many casualties also resulted from attempts by Jews to smuggle food and other necessities into the ghetto. The hospital's mortality rates were unavoidably high, despite the best efforts of the hospital's staff and workers.

== Last years and death ==
In 1942 and 1943, Heller refused to leave the hospital and the children she was trying to care for but did help her surviving son and his family escape the ghetto; they survived the war. Most of the doctors and nurses were sent to concentration camps; only a few (Teodozja Goliborska, Henryk Kroszczor, Rachela Kroszczorowa, and Adina Blady-Szwajger) survived. Heller (aged 55) and her sister, Sara Aftergut (aged 54, whose husband and daughter had been murdered in Treblinka), remained in the ghetto and were murdered there around 19 April 1943.

== Legacy ==
After the Holocaust, a plaque commemorating Heller was raised at the Jewish cemetery at Okopowa Street, on the joint tombstone of her husband and younger son. In April 2001, on a wall where the Bersohn and Bauman Children's Hospital had once stood, a similar plaque was unveiled.
