= Krzysztof Stanowski =

Krzysztof Stanowski may refer to:

- Krzysztof Stanowski (civic leader)
- Krzysztof Stanowski (journalist)
