= Stanowski =

Stanowski (feminine Stanowska) is a Polish surname. Notable people with the surname include:

- Krzysztof Stanowski (born 1959), Polish civic leader
- Krzysztof Stanowski (born 1982), Polish journalist
- Skip Stanowski (born 1944), Canadian ice hockey player
- Wally Stanowski (1919–2015), Canadian ice hockey player
