= Warsaw Ghetto Museum =

History museum in Warsaw

Coordinates: 52.23°N 21°E

- Muzeum Getta Warszawskiego
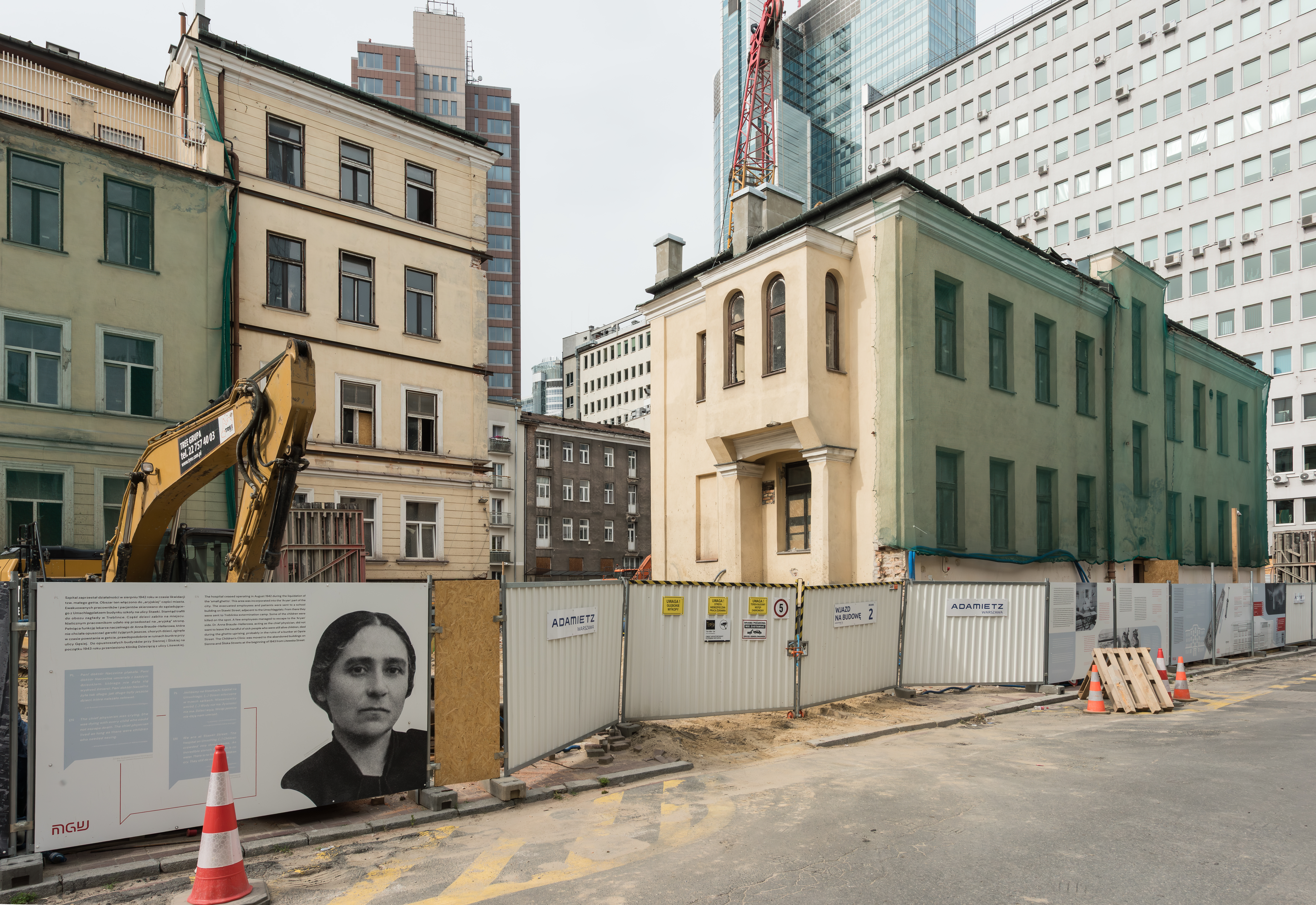
- Construction of the museum
- Location: Warsaw
- Type: Holocaust museum
- Director: Katarzyna Person
- Public transit access: Świętokrzyska
- Website: 1943.pl

The Warsaw Ghetto Museum is a historical museum in Warsaw currently under construction.

The target seat of the museum is the historic complex of the former Bersohn and Bauman Children's Hospital at Śliska 51 St./Sienna 60 St.

The museum’s director from 2018 to 2025 was Albert Stankowski. His successor, the Polish historian Katarzyna Person, was elected for the 2025–2030 term.

The mission of the institution is to disseminate knowledge about the everyday life, survival strategies, fight and extermination of Polish Jews in the Warsaw Ghetto and other ghettos on territory of the occupied Poland.

The museum's team is working on the creation of a permanent exhibition in the revitalised building of the former Bersohn and Bauman Children's Hospital, collecting archives, artefacts and testimonies of memory and drawing on the achievements, experience and resources of Polish and foreign institutions that deal with the topic of the ghetto.

The statutory tasks of the museum include: activities for the protection and care of the cultural heritage of Jews in the Warsaw Ghetto, conducting cultural, scientific, educational and popularisation activities related to the history of the Warsaw Ghetto and other ghettos built on the occupied Polish territories, initiating and supporting social initiatives and non-governmental organisations that contribute to the protection and commemoration of the history of the Warsaw Ghetto.

== History ==
Sigmund Nissenbaum, a participant in the Warsaw Ghetto Uprising, was the first initiator of the establishment of the Warsaw Ghetto Museum. At the end of the 1980s, he contacted the President of the Society of Fighters for Freedom and Democracy, prof. Henryk Jabłoński, to entrust the establishment of the Warsaw Ghetto Museum to the Nissenbaum Family Foundation. However, the works did not start at that point.

On 14 November 2017, the decision to establish the Warsaw Ghetto Museum was announced by the Polish Minister of Culture and National Heritage, Deputy Prime Minister Piotr Gliński. The museum was officially established on 28 February 2018. On 7 March 2018, in the Chancellery of the Prime Minister, there was a press conference on the establishment of the new institution, attended by Prime Minister Mateusz Morawiecki and Minister Piotr Gliński. Critics linked the timing of the announcement to the diplomatic crisis caused by the 2018 amendment to the Act on the Institute of National Remembrance and to broader concerns about the historical policy of the Law and Justice government.

In October 2018, the local government of the Mazowieckie Voivodeship leased the complex of the Bersohn and Bauman Children's Hospital to the museum for 30 years. Both buildings of the former hospital - the main pavilion and the southern pavilion - have been entered on the list of historical monuments by the Mazowieckie Voivodeship Conservator of Monuments in 2018. The permanent exhibition of the museum will be presented in the main building of the former hospital, while the two-storey southern pavilion, where the ophthalmology department was located, is to become the seat of the Education Department of the museum.

In November 2020, on the 80th anniversary of the closing of the ghetto borders, the authorities of the Mazowieckie Voivodeship sold the museum building for PLN 22.7 million (the funds for that purpose were provided by the Ministry of Culture and National Heritage). The museum had earlier been planned to open in 2023, on the 80th anniversary of the Warsaw Ghetto Uprising, but in 2025 a museum spokesperson said that the opening was planned for September 2027.

In 2020, the Institute of National Remembrance agreed to hand over the original of the Stroop Report as a deposit for the permanent exhibition at the museum.

The first meeting of the international Warsaw Ghetto Museum Council, that consisted of 15 members, took place on 10 September 2019. The Chairman of the Council became the Chief Rabbi of Poland, Michael Schudrich. In June 2021, the position was taken by Colette Avital.

== Visual identification ==
The concept for the visual identity of the Warsaw Ghetto Museum is the result of an international competition organised jointly with the Polish Association of Applied Graphic Designers. The competition was announced in September 2019. In the first stage, 216 applications were submitted, out of which the jury selected 6. The authors of the winning concept are the designers from the Lithuanian studio DADADA.

== Permanent exhibition ==
The work on the concept of the permanent exhibition began in 2019, under the supervision of Daniel Blatman, a historian and Professor at the Hebrew University of Jerusalem. The scientific team of the museum prepared documents with the initial concept of the exhibition. The team adopted three key parameters, which will constitute dominant themes in the historical narrative of the museum:

- a presentation of the broad perspective of Jewish life in Poland during the German occupation, going beyond the framework of Jewish history in the Warsaw Ghetto;
- the history of the Warsaw Ghetto against the background of the history of occupied Warsaw;
- conveying a universal message, based on which the tragedy of the Holocaust and extermination of Jews in Warsaw is the starting point for learning about the fate of other victims of Nazi persecution and for demonstrating humanistic values such as tolerance, compassion for minorities, dialogue between religious, ethnic and national groups.

Blatman described the planned exhibition as an attempt to place the Warsaw Ghetto and the Holocaust within the broader history of the Second World War and the Nazi occupation of Poland, while still centring the fate of the Jews. He also argued that a museum located on a site where the Holocaust occurred could not tell the history of the ghetto without addressing what happened outside the ghetto wall.

The permanent exhibition of the museum is to be based on authentic artefacts from the period of the German occupation of Poland.

In autumn 2022, the museum published a series of videos presenting the concepts of the permanent exhibition galleries. The videos featured the curators of the galleries and specialists involved in the preparation of the exhibition.

The museum constantly looks for historical artefacts, testimonies and documents relating to the functioning of the Warsaw Ghetto and its commemoration.

In 2022, the museum's collection included 5,125 artefacts, divided into archives, iconography and exhibits.

In 2025, the museum announced that Blatman's contract would end on 31 October 2025, explaining that the institution had entered the production phase of the permanent exhibition and that the historical-narrative work had been completed. Blatman disputed this explanation and warned that narrowing the exhibition, reducing material on other victims of Nazi genocide and changing the approved concept without transparent scholarly oversight would damage the museum’s credibility. A museum spokesperson denied that changes had been introduced to the permanent exhibition or to the historical narrative adopted in 2023.

=== Reception and controversy ===
Before its opening, the museum became the subject of controversy among Polish and Israeli Holocaust scholars over whether an institution created and financed under the Law and Justice government would present the Holocaust without subordinating it to PiS historical policy. Critics argued that the museum risked emphasizing Polish-Jewish solidarity and German perpetrators while insufficiently addressing Polish antisemitism, collaboration, denunciations, blackmail and violence against Jews during the Holocaust. The Polish Centre for Holocaust Research scholar Agnieszka Haska argued that the history of the Holocaust could not be selectively presented and that the Righteous Among the Nations were an exception rather than the norm in the spectrum of Polish wartime behaviour towards Jews. Havi Dreifuss of Tel Aviv University and Yad Vashem rejected an invitation to work with the museum, arguing that it sought Israeli approval for a project that many leading Polish Holocaust historians had refused to support. Dreifuss and Polish Holocaust historians including Jan Grabowski, Barbara Engelking, Agnieszka Haska and Jacek Leociak criticized Blatman's role as legitimising a PiS-backed narrative of the Holocaust. In this debate, the key criticism was that the participation of Poles in the persecution and murder of Jews must not disappear from a museum narrative limited to victims and German perpetrators.

Blatman rejected the criticism and said that no area of Holocaust history was taboo for the museum, including Polish antisemitism and instances of collaboration. Albert Stankowski also denied that the authorities had made political demands or steered the museum’s content. In 2025, a further dispute arose after Blatman said that parts of the exhibition concerning other victims of Nazi genocide and references to other twentieth-century genocides were being removed, which he described as a distortion of history motivated by sensitivity to possible comparisons with the war in Gaza. The museum denied that the approved historical narrative of the exhibition had been changed.

=== The most valuable artefacts in WGM collection ===
1. Hannukiah – a monumentral candelabrum of the synagogue type, dating to the 19th century. Made of bronze, the base is supported by depictions of lions. Purchased at Sotheby's auction in December 2022.

2. A kiddush cup which belonged to Kalman Kalonymus Shapiro, one of the Schutz shop's employees. A present of one of Shapiro's father Elimelech's follower from Grodzisko.

3. Megillat Esther – a pre-war megillah case made of silver in the Warsaw factory of Israel Szekman (the factory was closed in 1939). The central part bears an inscription in Hebrew. This in an object of exceptionally unique historical value, a witness to religious life in the Warsaw Ghetto.

4. Stroop Report.

5. Photographs of the burning ghetto – 11 photographs of the burning Warsaw Ghetto made from the “Aryan” side. The photos were taken on May 2, 1943 by Ryszard Jurgelewicz. The collection was donated to WGM in November 2022 by the photographer's grandson Ryszard Sikorski.

6. Cart for transporting dead bodies – dated to the 1930s, it has undergone professional restoration. The cart was discovered and purchased after the war by Pinkus Szenicer, a long-time guard of the Jewish cemetery in Warsaw. It then became the property of Szenicer's son Bolesław Szenicer (1952-), the founder of The Jewish Cemetery Foundation “Gęsia” in Warsaw. The cart was purchased with the help of The Nissenbaum Family Foundation.

7. Henryk Hechtkopf, Ruiny („Ruins”) – a collection of 76 drawings was donated to WGM by Rachel Postavski. The collection includes 22 drawings of the Warsaw Ghetto ruins which were drawn from nature – they are dated 1946-47. The rest depictions scenes from the ghetto life, as well as postwar life in Warsaw.

8. Erna Rosenstein, Golgota („Calvary”), 1968, acrylic, canvas – an exceptional piece not only in Erna Rosenstein's heritage but also in the whole Polish postwar art, which deals with a complicated history in private, social and political layers. It will be one of the key works of the WGM collection and the permanent exhibition of the museum.

9. Gustav Metzger, Historic Photographs: no. 1: Liquidation of the Warsaw Ghetto, April 19 – 28 days, 1943, 1995/2022 – a series of historical photographs made from enlarged archival photos that have been somehow hidden or obscured so that the viewer is not able to see the whole picture at once. For the museum, this is an extremely interesting work contextualizing the photos from the original Stroop Report as well as other photographs from the ghetto.

10. Maryan S. Maryan, no name, 1969, acrylic, canvas.

11. Ceija Stojka, SS.Auschitz, 2002, acrylic, carton.

12. Harun Farocki, Respite, 2007, film – a film based on the materials recorded in the Nazi Westerborg transit camp (The Netherlands) by a prisoner Rudolph Breslauer by order of the camp commander. The original recording, re-edited and accompanied by text comments, shows the delusion of the documentary being in fact an instrument of progagadna where the author carefully smuggles the fragments of cruel reality which are visible for Farocki and the audience many years later. The film will be a part of the collection of contemporary artists' work.

== Temporary exhibitions ==
In the course of its efforts to create a permanent exhibition, the museum also undertakes various exhibition-related activities. The projects of the museum are made available both in the urban space of Warsaw and in the virtual space. The projects of the museum are made available both in the urban space of Warsaw and in the virtual space. The following exhibitions have been organised so far:

1. "Witness to History. Bersohn and Bauman Children's Hospital" (23 July 2018 – 15 January 2019). The first outdoor exhibition of the museum was dedicated to the history of the Bersohn and Bauman Children's Hospital, the target home of the museum. The exhibition consisted of 20 boards placed on the fence of the building at Śliska 51/Sienna 60 streets. Curator: Ewa Toniak.
2. “Standing Up Straight, Unbent... Natan Rapaport and the Monument to the Ghetto Heroes" (18 April 2019 - 30 October 2019). The exhibition was dedicated to Natan Rapaport, the designer of the Monument to the Ghetto Heroes. The exhibition was based on photographic material presenting the artist and his work. It was arranged in front of the Monument to the Ghetto Heroes in Warsaw. Curator: dr Magdalena Tarnowska.
3. "Postcards From Our Neighborhood.. The history of Sienna and Śliska streets" (15 May 2019 – 10 January 2020). The exhibition, which was placed at the fence of the Bersohn and Bauman Children's Hospital, presented a part of the capital city that changed over three centuries and which was still the outskirts of the city in the 17th century. It was based on photographic materials from numerous national and foreign archives. Curator: dr Magdalena Tarnowska.
4. "Uncovering Warsaw – Three Views" (8 September 2019 – 15 November 2019). The exhibition at Grzybowski Square presented three images of the city: during the pre-war time, the wartime one and the one from the reconstruction period. Curator: dr Magdalena Piecyk.
5. "One in Three" (15 April 2020 – 31 December 2021). An exhibition presented the history of the Warsaw Ghetto. Due to the Sars-Cov-2 pandemic, the museum was able to present only the online version of the exhibition on 15 April. From 22 July, the exhibition was presented on Grzybowski Square. The exhibition was part of the celebrations on the occasion of the 77th anniversary of the outbreak of the Ghetto Uprising and the 80th anniversary of the closure of the ghetto on 16 November. Curator: Rafał Kosewski.
6. "City of the Living – City of the Dead" (16 November 2021 – 31 December 2022) - a photography project by Robert Wilczyński presenting archival photographs from the Warsaw Ghetto and photographs of contemporary Warsaw. The photographs were accompanied by source texts documenting the life and death of the prisoners of the Warsaw Ghetto. The photo boards were hung on the fence of the former Bersohn and Bauman Children's Hospital.
7. "Ordinary/Unusual. Doctors in the Warsaw Ghetto" at Grzybowski Square (4 April 2022 – 15 July 2022). The exhibition told the story of the doctors Anna Braude-Hellerowa and Franciszek Raszeja. In April 2022, in the All Saints Church, it was also possible to see the artefacts related to the professional life of Franciszek Raszeja, including his Righteous Among the Nations medal granted to him posthumously. Curator: dr Paweł Freus.
8. "Those Among the Thousands..." (21 July 2022 – 31 December 2022). An exhibition commemorating the victims of the so-called Great Action in the Warsaw Ghetto, presenting some of the victims' profiles. The exhibition at Grzybowski Square was open on the occasion of the 80th anniversary of "Grossaktion". Curator: dr Halina Postek.
9. “Ghetto Burning” at Grzybowski Square (20.04.2023 - 29.12.2023). Based on Tomasz Bereźnicki’s publication, one of a handful of graphic novels in Polish about the dramatic plight of the Warsaw Ghetto insurgents. What makes it even more extraordinary is the fact that we learn about the tragic events of 1943 through the story of three young Jewish girls, former playmates, who decide to put up armed resistance against Nazi terror. Curator: dr Paweł Freus.
10. "We Collect, We Build, We Remember" at Grzybowski Square (4.04.2024 – 31.12.2024). Visitors were able to explore a project of nine thematic galleries telling the story of a divided city. Photographs from the MGW collection, accompanied by short texts, will guide us through the fate of Warsaw’s Jews from the late 19th century to the immediate post-war period, particularly the history of the Warsaw Ghetto. Curators: Monika Mastyj and Zofia Gałązka

=== Online exhibitions ===
1. "Logo for the Museum" (14 July 2020 – 31 December 2020). The exhibition presented the works that took part in the competition for the logo of the museum. The exhibition was to be shown at the State Ethnographic Museum; however, due to the COVID-19 pandemic, it was presented online. Curator: Tomasz Kaliński.
2. "The Warsaw Ghetto. People, Places, Events – around the Shop of Abraham Ostrzega" (21 September 2020). The first edition of the virtual exhibition presented the biographies of Jewish artists associated with the so-called shop of Abraham Ostrzega in the Warsaw ghetto. Curator: dr Magdalena Piecyk.
3. "The Warsaw Ghetto. People, Places, Events – the Bersohn and Bauman Children's Hospital" (16 November 2021). The second edition of the virtual exhibition was dedicated to the Bersohn-Bauman Children's Hospital and the doctors who worked there. The exhibition accompanied the 81st anniversary of the closure of the Warsaw Ghetto. Curator: Joanna Bakoń.

== Scientific activity ==
The scientific activities of the Warsaw Ghetto Museum include: scientific conferences and seminars, archaeological and excavation works, etc.

The first international scientific conference organised by the Warsaw Ghetto Museum in cooperation with the Polish Society for Jewish Studies, the Emanuel Ringelblum Jewish Historical Institute, European Network Remembrance and Solidarity and Touro College in Berlin took place on 18–19 November 2019. The conference: "The beginnings of the Nazi occupation. Continuity and change in Polish and Jewish life 1939–1941" was part of the programme on the occasion of the 80th anniversary of the start of WWII.

At the turn of July and August 2021, at the invitation of the Warsaw Ghetto Museum, a research team of Prof. Richard Freund from Christopher Newport University in Virginia came to Warsaw and conducted geophysical research in places related to the history of the Warsaw Ghetto together with archaeologist Dr Jacek Konik from the museum. In October 2021, the museum, in cooperation with the Pułtusk Academy of Humanities, performed excavations at the northern border of the Krasiński Garden, on the western side of the pre-war axis of Wałowa Street. During the excavations, more than a thousand objects were found.

In the summer of 2022, the museum, in cooperation with Christopher Newport University and the Pułtusk Academy of Humanities, began excavations and archaeological research in Muranów, on the site of the former Warsaw Ghetto. The research was performed in the area of Miła – Dubois – Niska –Karmelicka streets, in the area where Anielewicz's bunker was located. Approximately 3,000 artefacts were found during the excavation works, including many objects of everyday use, as well as religious objects such as pieces of Jewish prayer books and tefillin used by Jews.

In September 2022, the Warsaw Ghetto Museum was one of the organisers of the international academic conference "80 years after Aktion «Reinhardt» (1942-1943)". The conference was held as part of the commemoration of the 80th anniversary of the beginning of Operation Reinhardt, which was carried out by Nazi Germany in the years 1942-1943, on the territory of the General Government and the Białystok District.

The museum also organizes scientific seminars on Holocaust-related subjects and its perceptions in museums. Another scientific activity is organizing series of webinars about the Holocaust.

== Educational activities ==
The museum has a well-developed educational offer for both kids and adults. The Education Department of the museum offers school lessons and workshops, seminars, conferences, Warsaw walking tours and educational walks.

The classes organised by the museum concern both the religion, tradition and culture of Polish Jews, as well as the history of the Warsaw Ghetto and the everyday life of people forced to live there. In the years 2018-2020, the museum conducted 164 classes in Warsaw and Masovia. On regular basis, the museum also organises lessons in secondary schools located in the area of former Warsaw Ghetto.

In the spring of 2019, WGM began a series of regular Warsaw walking tours related to the history and functioning of the Warsaw Ghetto. The tours are in Polish, English and German. In April 2022, Warsaw walking tours for refugees from Ukraine were added to the offer of the museum.

The Education Department of the museum offers training for teachers and educators in the form of conferences, getaway seminars and workshops. Meetings with teachers and educators were initiated with the 2019 conference "Around the Warsaw Ghetto and other ghettos of occupied Poland" ( 29-31 March 2019). So far, four getaway seminars have been organised: "Warsaw Ghetto – Treblinka – Majdanek" (25-27 October 2019), "Chełmno nad Nerem and Łódź" (9 October 2021), "In the footsteps of Operation Reinhardt – Lublin, Trawniki, Poniatowa" (26-27 March 2022) and "Hasag – German forced labour camp" (1-2 October 2022).

As part of the collaboration with the Polish Underground State Foundation, an educational guide related to the history of the Jews from Warsaw was produced in 2019. The guide in the form of an educational game is available on the website of the museum.

Cooperation with the World Association of Home Army Soldiers, within the framework of the "Niepodległa" Multi-Annual Programme, has resulted in a series of interviews with the Holocaust survivors, former Gray Ranks scouts, members of the underground, witnesses to history and family members of the Righteous Among the Nations. Another project implemented as part of the "Niepodległa" Multi-Annual Programme was entitled: "The image of the Jewish community in the eyes of their neighbours". This time, the residents of Warsaw, Łódź, Vilnius, Novogrudok, Oświęcim, Mińsk Mazowiecki, Tykocin and Bliżyn shared their memories. They talked about their Jewish neighbours, about events from their common and – from a certain moment – separate history which remained in their memory.

In 2020, the museum started a video project: "The Warsaw ghetto in Literature", the purpose of which was to show the ghetto from three perspectives: victims, executioners and witnesses. The project is an artistic interpretation of four publications: "Shielding the flame" (Zdążyć przed Panem Bogiem) by Hanna Krall, "Conversations with an executioner" by Kazimierz Moczarski, "Campo di Fiori" by Czesław Miłosz and "Memories. My version" by Wacław Isaac Kornblum. As part of a project for schools located on the territory of the former Warsaw Ghetto, the motto of which was: "What does it mean – what might it mean for our future – that we live around the place of their death?"(J. M. Rymkiewicz). The film "Opening the Silence" was produced in cooperation with a high school – XVII Liceum Ogólnokształcące z Oddziałami Dwujęzycznymi im. Andrzeja Frycza Modrzewskiego.

In November 2022, the Education Department of the museum in collaboration with the Faculty of Social Sciences of the SWPS University of Social Sciences and Humanities organised a webinar: "Around the trauma of the Holocaust" dedicated to the issue of trauma in its broadest sense. The seminar was attended by researchers from Poland, Ukraine and Israel.

The Education Department of the museum is also involved in the design of urban and educational games on the history of the Warsaw Ghetto and educational materials for teachers and educators.

== Publications ==
The museum is also involved in publishing activities. The following publications have been published to date:

- Węgrzynek H., Zieliński K., Szpital Bersohnów i Baumanów, Warsaw 2019 – an album presenting the history of the Bersohn and Bauman Children's Hospital as a witness to history;
- Kornblum W. I., Wspomnienia. Moja wersja, Warsaw 2019
- Walewski R., Jurek, Warsaw 2020
- Erlich B., Żydowskie dziecko Warszawy, Warsaw 2021
- Getto warszawskie w literaturze polskiej. Antologia, wybór i opracowanie Sławomir Buryła, Warsaw 2021
- Głowiński T., Lahnstaedt S., Międykowski W., Tak, jak gdyby nas nigdy nie było, Warsaw 2021
- Zbieramy, budujemy, pamiętamy. Warsaw Ghetto Museum, Warsaw 2021
- „Wolność! Zwróćcie nam naszą!" Eseje historyczne o getcie warszawskim, red. M. Grądzka-Rejak, K. Zieliński, Warsaw 2022
- „W roku trzyǳiestym ǳiewiątym poszedłem inną drogą…” Eseje historyczne o getcie warszawskim, red. M. Grądzka-Rejak, K. Zieliński, Warsaw 2022

Apart from the above, the following works have been published with the collaboration of the museum:

- Małkowska-Bieniek E., Bohaterki drugiego planu. Buchholtz, Auerbach oraz Berman, wydawnictwo Oficyna CM, Warsaw 2022
- Krempa A., Sztetl Mielec. Z historii mieleckich Żydów, Samorządowe Centrum Kultury w Mielcu, Warsaw Ghetto Museum, 2022

== Commemorating the Holocaust victims ==
The Warsaw Ghetto Museum undertakes numerous activities to commemorate the victims of wartime terror, e.g. by organizing events to restore the memory of the victims of the Holocaust in Poland.

The museum was, inter alia, a co-organiser of the celebrations of the 77th, 78th and 79th anniversaries of the Warsaw Ghetto Uprising and the initiator and organiser of the celebrations on the occasion of the 80th, 81st and 82nd anniversary of the closure of the Warsaw Ghetto on November 16. On the occasion of the 82nd anniversary of the ghetto border closing, a new plaque was placed on the preserved piece of the ghetto wall at 62 Złota Street, which presents the map of the ghetto at the time of the closure of the Jewish District on 16 November 1940.

The Warsaw Ghetto Museum is a patron of the March of Remembrance organised by the Emanuel Ringelblum Jewish Historical Institute to commemorate the victims of Grossaktion Warsaw.

The museum co-organised the X and XI Holocaust Remembrance Day in Łódź; it took an active part in organising workshops for schoolchildren and participated in a panel discussion on education related to Holocaust.

In 2019, on the initiative of the specialists from the Warsaw Ghetto Museum, the fence of the building at 5/7 Stawki Street, near Niska Street, was included in the municipal register of historical monuments of the City of Warsaw.

The museum has taken part in consultations with the office of the Voivodeship Conservator of Monuments, indicating, inter alia, spots of particular historical significance in the area of the former ghetto, as well as preparing reports on the current condition of the remains of the ghetto buildings. On 6 October 2021, the area of the former Warsaw Ghetto was included in the municipal register of historical monuments.

In 2022, the museum was one of the co-organisers of a programme to commemorate the 80th anniversary of the German Nazi Operation Reinhardt, co-financed by the Ministry of Culture and National Heritage and under the honorary patronage of Polish President Andrzej Duda. The programme included scientific conferences and seminars, outdoor exhibitions and educational meetings for secondary school students. A documentary film entitled "Aktion Reinhardt" directed by Michał Szymanowicz was produced and its premiere was during the Holocaust Remembrance Day in Lublin in April 2022; a concert entitled "As if we had never existed" was held in memory of the victims of the Holocaust in the territory of the General Government and the Białystok District; an album entitled "As if we had never existed" was published - it presents archive photographs and information on the course and consequence of "Aktion Reinhardt". In July 2022, to commemorate the victims of Operation Reinhardt, a monument by Jerzy Kalina, "The Matzevah of Memory", was unveiled in Józefów Biłgorajski. It was a joint initiative of the Warsaw Ghetto Museum and the Mayor of Józefów.

In October 2022, the museum launched an initiative to collect signatures to support giving the name of the Jewish Military Union to the junction of Gen. W. Anders and Stawki streets in Warsaw.

== Cooperation ==
The Warsaw Ghetto Museum cooperates with many museums, academic and research institutions, as well as Jewish organisations. The museum's partners are, inter alia: the Institute of National Remembrance, the Emanuel Ringelblum Jewish Historical Institute, the Majdanek State Museum, the Warsaw Rising Museum, POLIN Museum of the History of Polish Jews, the Social and Cultural Association of Jews in Poland, the Institute of Archaeology and Ethnology of the Polish Academy of Sciences, Hebrew University in Jerusalem, Touro College in Berlin, the Holocaust Museum in Sered, Slovakia, the Jewish Community of Warsaw, and Chabad Lubavitch of Poland.

The museum's excavation site was visited by, among others, the Director of the Menachem Begin Heritage Centre in Jerusalem Herzel Makov, the Ambassador of the United States to Poland Mark Brzezinski and the Israeli Ambassador to Poland Dr. Yacov Livne. Among those who have visited the museum were representatives of Jewish institutions in Estonia and the United States. In August 2022, the museum visitors were the researchers from the National Museum of the History of Ukraine in the Second World War who took part in the meeting: "The Work of Museum in War Time", dedicated to the functioning of the museum in Kyiv during the ongoing Russian war in Ukraine.
