= Bersohn and Bauman Children's Hospital, Warsaw =

Former hospital in Warsaw

Bersohn and Bauman Children's Hospital
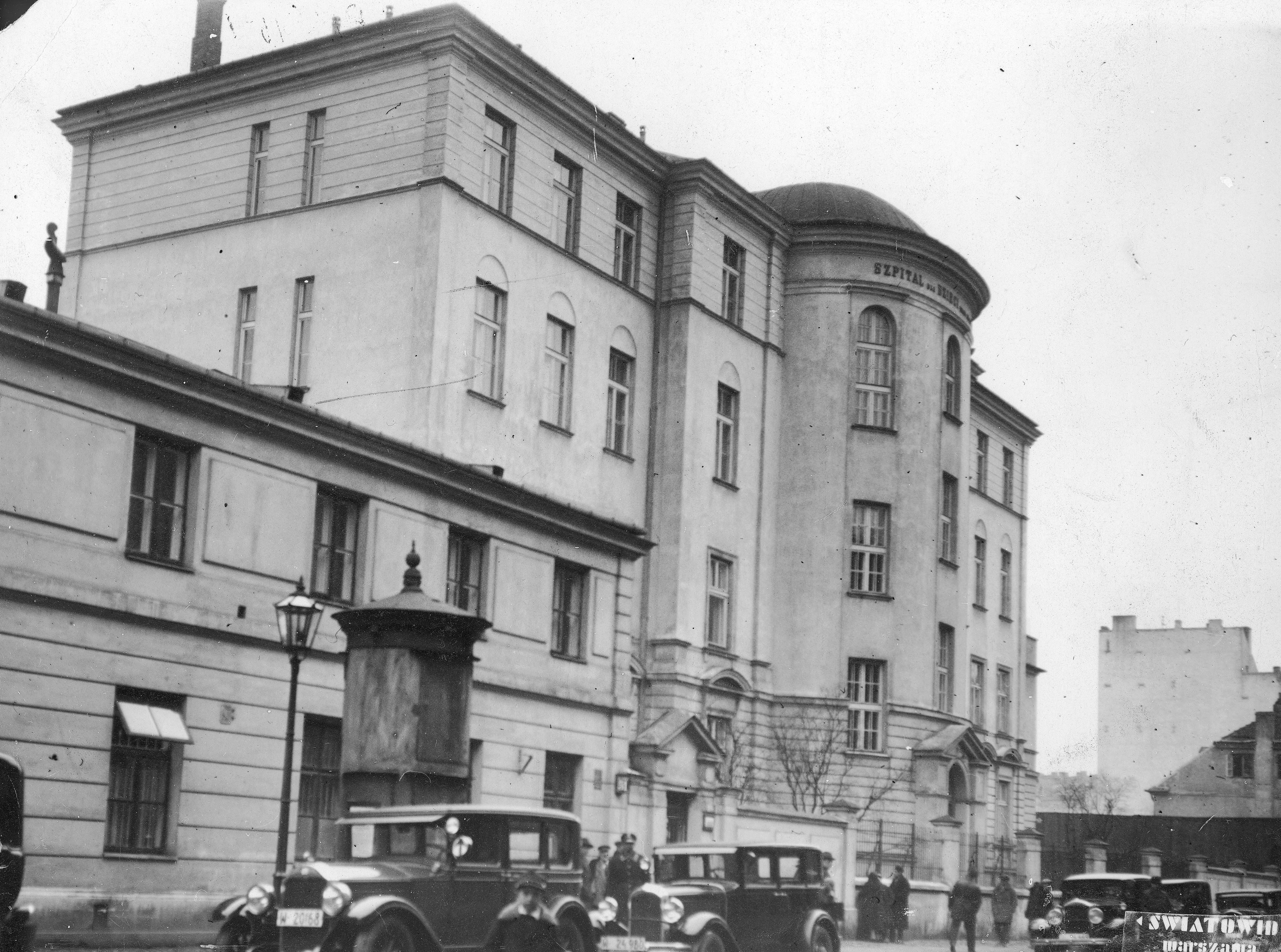
- Bersohn and Bauman Children's Hospital in 1930
- Interactive map of the Bersohn and Bauman Children's Hospital area

General information
- Location: Warsaw, Congress Poland; Government General of Warsaw; Second Polish Republic
- Coordinates: 52°13′53″N 20°59′51″E
- Construction started: 1876
- Completed: 1878

Design and construction
- Architect: Artur Goebel

Bersohn and Bauman Children's Hospital was a Jewish medical facility operating from 1878 to 1942 in Warsaw at 51 Śliska Street/ 60 Sienna Street.

In 1941, a branch of the hospital was established at 80/82 Leszno Street and, after the liquidation of the so-called small ghetto in August 1942, it was moved to Umschlagplatz, to the building at 6/8 Stawki Street.

== History ==
The idea to build a hospital to treat Jewish children was born in the early 1870s. In 1873 two families: Majer and Chaja Bersohn and their daughter Paulina Bauman together with her husband Salomon bought the land for the construction of the hospital. Initially, the facility was intended for 27 children. The hospital was built in the area between two parallel streets: Sienna and Śliska (hence the double address). Thanks to the families’ financial support, the entire hospital complex, designed by Artur Goebel, was built in 1876-1878. The first chief physician of the hospital was Ludwik Chwat.

Between 1905 and 1912, Janusz Korczak worked in the hospital as a pediatrician.

=== World War I ===
During the First World War, the financial situation of the hospital changed dramatically, due to the fact that the testamentary and founding provisions were devalued. In 1923 the facility was closed down. The situation changed after numerous interventions of doctor Anna Braude-Heller, thanks to whom hospital buildings that belonged to the Bersohn and Bauman Foundation Board were taken over by the Society of Friends of Children in 1930.

Soon, efforts were made to expand the hospital complex, which was financed by the Warsaw Jewish Community and the American Jewish Joint Distribution Committee. After the enlargement the hospital had 150 beds.

=== World War II ===
At the outbreak of the war, the hospital had about 250 hospital beds. The buildings did not suffer any damage during the defense of Warsaw. In November 1940, the hospital was incorporated into the Warsaw Ghetto. German authorities appointed Wacław Konieczny from Inowrocław as the hospital administrator.

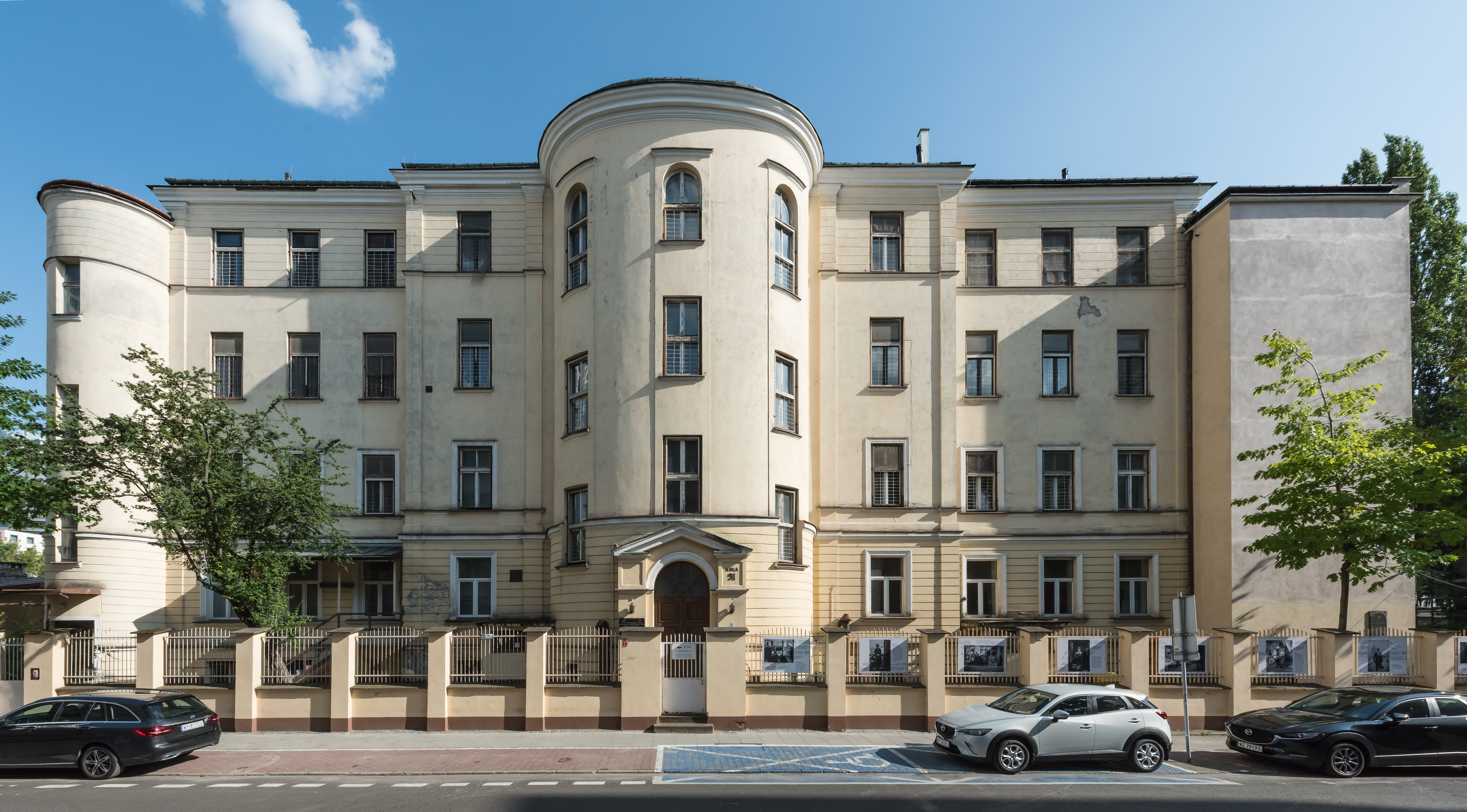
Hospital building today, view from Śliska Street.

As the hospital was overcrowded due to a huge increase in the number of children suffering from typhus fever, in October 1941, thanks to the efforts of Anna Braude-Hellerowa, a branch was opened at 86/88 Żelazna Street, at the corner of 80/82 Leszno Street. 400 patients were admitted to the newly-organized hospital.

Since February 1942, the staff of the hospital have been taking part in scientific research on hunger disease in the Warsaw Ghetto. The research was conducted in utmost secrecy in order to avoid German-ordered shutdown. Postmortem examinations of starved to death patients were carried out in a shed at the Jewish cemetery at Okopowa Street, where they waited for burial in mass graves. Some of the typescripts with results of the research were delivered to the "Aryan" side. They were published in 1946 in a book edited by Emil Apfelbaum "Hunger Disease. Clinical research on hunger carried out in the Warsaw Ghetto in 1942".

As a result of the reduction of the ghetto area on August 10, 1942 (the liquidation of the so-called small ghetto), the mother hospital and its patients were evacuated from Sienna Street. On August 13, the hospital was moved to the buildings of former common schools at 6/8 Stawki Street in the Umschlagplatz area. Doctors and nurses lived in a tenement house at 22 Pawia St. The hospital staff could enter the Umschlagplatz area in a compact column after a thorough control.

In Umschlagplatz, the Bersohn and Bauman Hospital merged with the second Jewish hospital in the Warsaw Ghetto, the Czyste Hospital. On September 11, 1942, the sick and most of the staff (about 1000 people) were deported to the death camp in Treblinka. Adina Blady-Szwajger gave a group of children morphine so that they could die in the hospital in peace, avoiding the suffering of displacement.

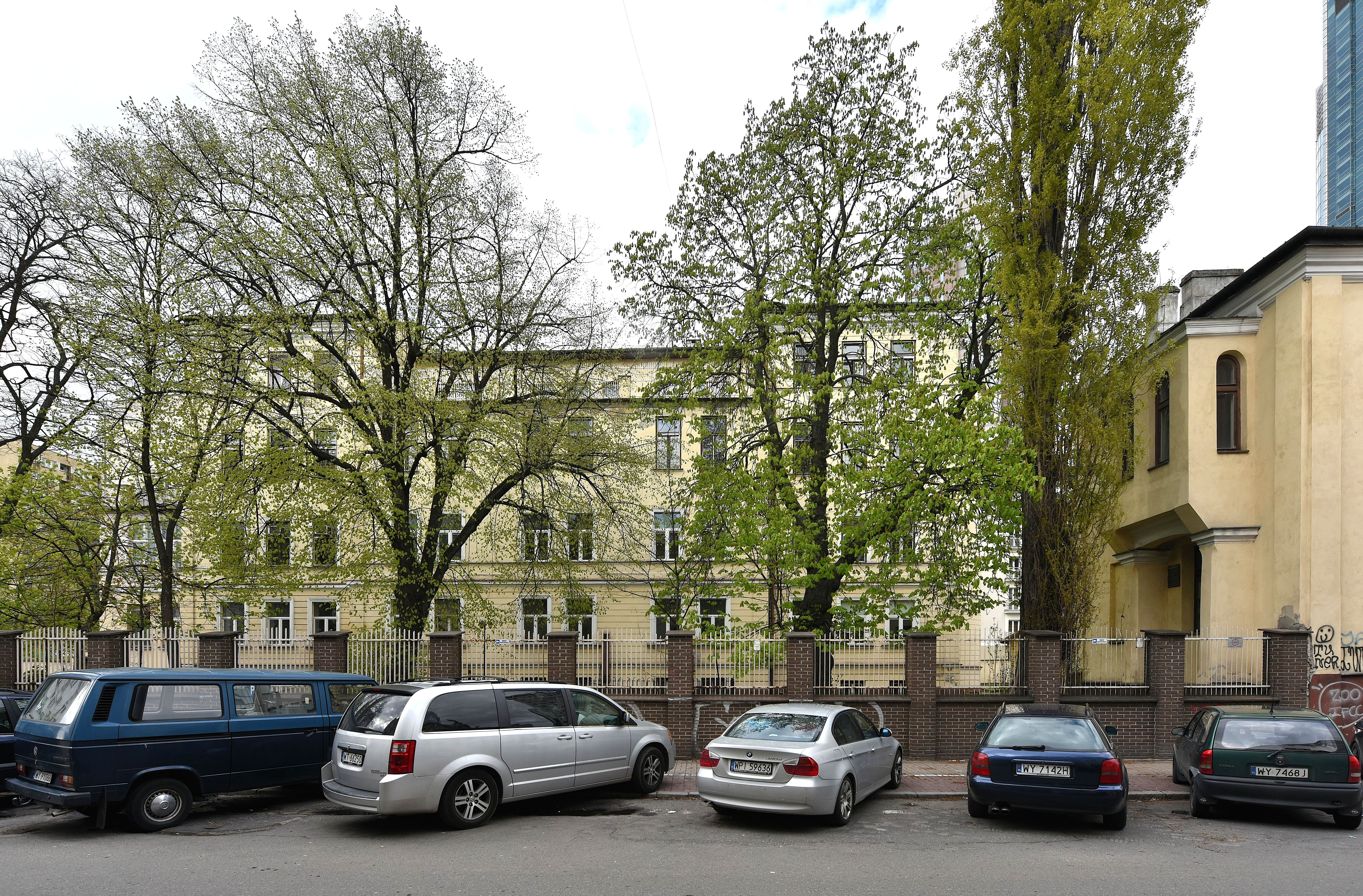
The hospital complex looking from Sienna Street.

During the war, at the beginning of 1943, the Children's Clinic from Litewska Street was located in the abandoned buildings of the hospital. It operated there until the Warsaw Uprising. From August to October 1944, the hospital was the only professional medical facility in the downtown area of Warsaw. Hospital buildings were damaged during the uprising.

=== Post-World War II ===
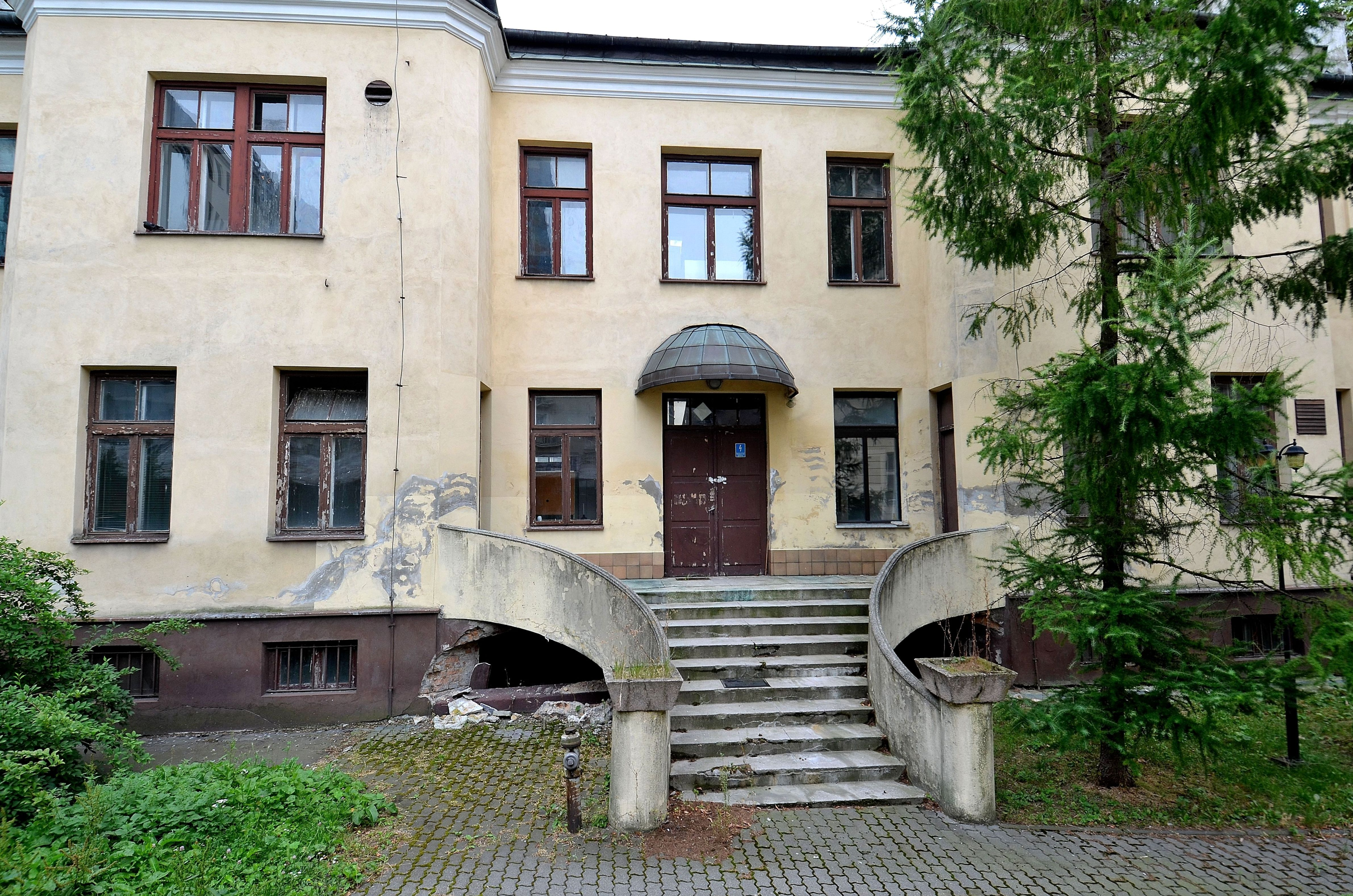
Entrance to the southern pavilion.

After the end of the war, in 1946-1950, after reconstruction, the hospital buildings housed the headquarters and apartments of employees of the Central Committee of Polish Jews. It was then adapted back to medical needs and housed a hospital for children with infectious diseases. Between 1988 and 1993 all the buildings were rebuilt and modernized. Later, it housed the Provincial Infectious Hospital named after the Children of Warsaw. In 2000, the center was merged with Children's Hospital in Dziekanów Leśny, where all the units were gradually transferred. In 2016, the owner of the property, the local government of the Mazowieckie Voivodeship, put the emptied property up for sale. In 2017, the Ministry of Culture and National Heritage asked the voivodship's government to lease the former hospital for 30 years and establish the Warsaw Ghetto Museum there.

== Commemoration ==
On April 20, 2001, a plaque commemorating Anna Braude-Heller, director of the hospital in the years 1930-1942, was unveiled on the wall of the main building of the hospital (from Śliska Street side).

== Hospital staff ==
- Anna Braude-Heller
- Adina Blady-Szwajger
- Marek Edelman
- Teodozja Goliborska-Gołąb
- Hanna Hirszfeldowa
- Janusz Korczak
- Julian Kramsztyk
- Henryk Kroszczor
- Henryk Makower
- Anna Margolis
