= Virtual Shtetl =

Website of Polish Jewish history museum

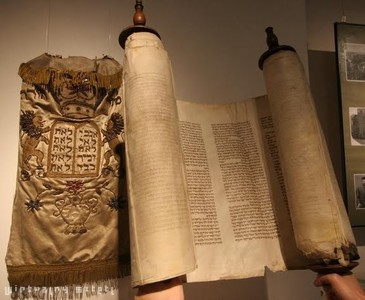
Torah scroll of the dress

The Virtual Shtetl (Polish: Wirtualny Sztetl) is a bilingual Polish-English portal of the Museum of the History of Polish Jews in Warsaw, devoted to the Jewish history of Poland.

== History ==
The Virtual Shtetl website was officially launched on June 16, 2009 by founder Albert Stankowski. The portal lists over 1,900 towns with maps, statistics and picture galleries. In the future, it will also include an interactive system by which Internet users will interact with each other. It creates a link between Polish-Jewish history and the contemporary, multi-cultural world.

The Virtual Shtetl is an extension of the real Museum opened in 2013 on the site of the Warsaw Ghetto, facing the Monument to the Ghetto Heroes. Its main objective is to provide a unique social forum for everyone interested in Polish-Jewish life. The "Virtual Shtetl" re-tells the history of Polish Jews which existed, to a great extent, in a town or a village (Yiddish: shtetl). But besides that, it also provides information about German Jews and the Jewish life of the Eastern territories of Germany.

The portal provides information on small towns and big cities—both about the past and the present. It covers both contemporary and pre-war Poland. The English version enables Jews from all over the world to research their own Polish ancestry. Creating a fuller picture of Polish-Jewish history and Polish-Jewish relations was possible thanks to the efforts of many institutions, organizations and individuals. Because the subject is so broad, the initiatives for further research and development are considered infinite. Numerous resources have been provided by the Polin portal and the Jewish.org.pl community portal. Other Internet projects which have participated were the www.izrael.badacz.org and Diapozytyw (Adam Mickiewicz Institute) as well as the Jewish Historical Institute.

== See also ==
- The Holocaust in Poland
- History of the Polish Jews
- Włodawa Synagogue at the List of active synagogues in Poland
