= Kazimierz Wiatr =

Polish politician (born 1955)

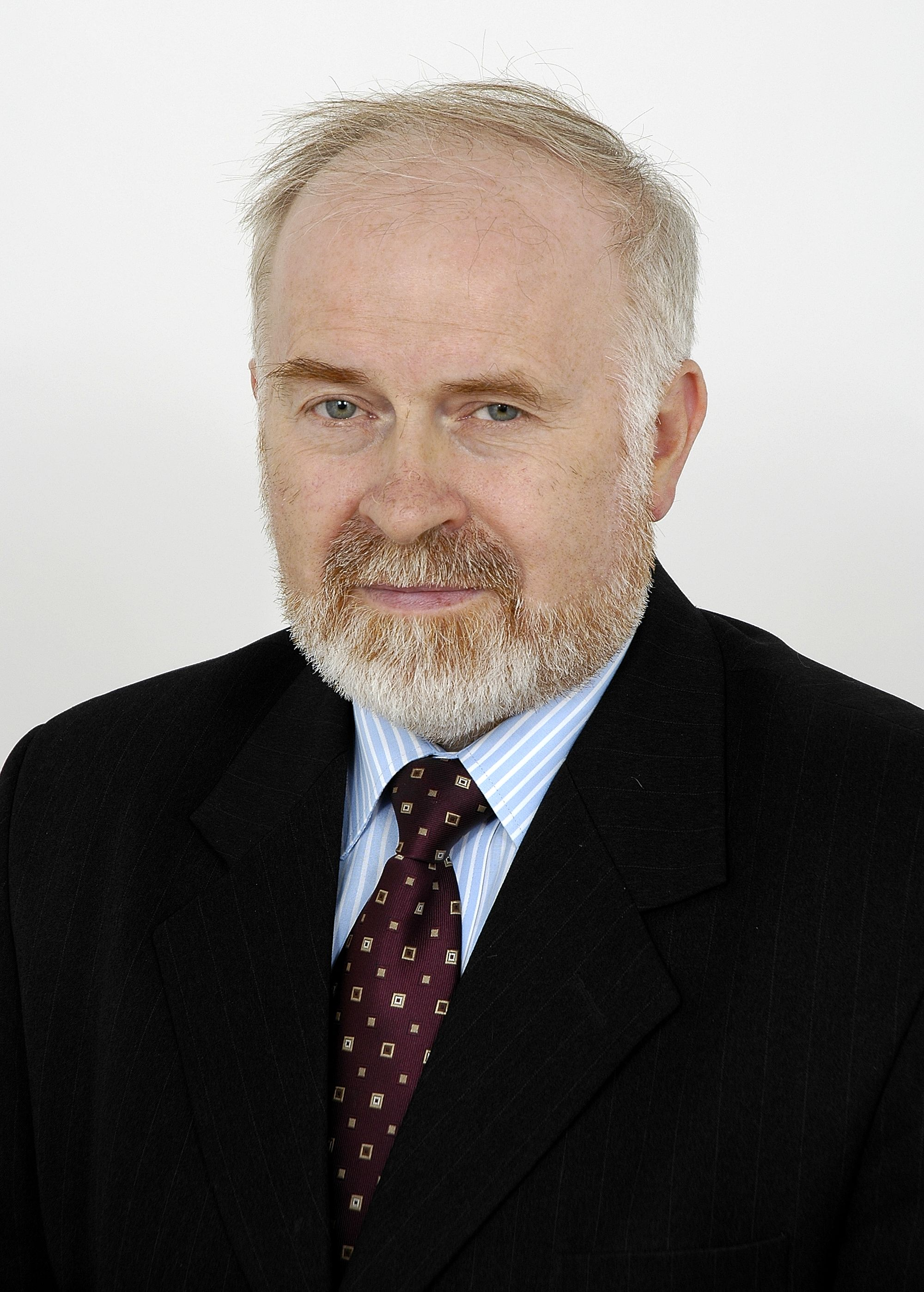

Member of the Senate
- Incumbent
- Assumed office 19 October 2005

Personal details
- Born: 18 February 1955 Kraków, Poland
- Profession: Scientist
- Website: www.kazimierzwiatr.pl

Kazimierz Adam Wiatr (born 18 February 1955) is a Polish scientist and politician, professor of technical sciences at AGH University of Science and Technology, scoutmaster, former chairman of the Scouting Association of the Polish Republic (2004–2006), director of the Cyfronet AGH Academic Computer Center in Kraków (2004–2025), senator of the 6th, 7th, 8th, 9th, 10th, and 11th terms (since 2005) representing the constituency of Tarnów.

Senator Kazimierz Wiatr has received the following decorations:

- Commander’s Cross with Star of the Order of Polonia Restituta (2025), awarded by the President of the Republic of Poland, Andrzej Duda.
- Medal of the Commission of National Education (2000).
- Silver Cross of Merit (1999).
- Knight’s Cross of the Order of Polonia Restituta (1990), awarded by the President of the Republic of Poland in exile, Ryszard Kaczorowski.
