= Katarzyna Person =

Polish Holocaust historian

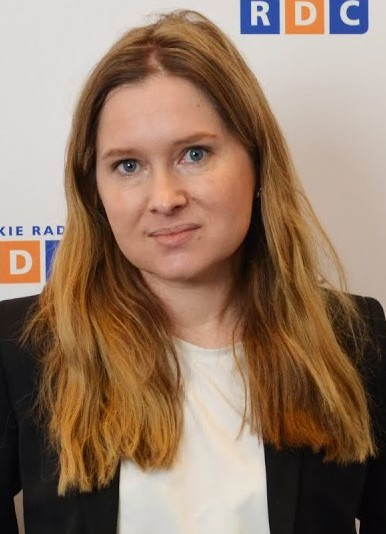
- Portrait of Person, 2025
- Born: 1982 (age 43–44)
- Occupation: Historian
- Father: Andrzej Person

Academic background
- Education: Royal Holloway, UoL
- Thesis: Assimilated Jews in the Warsaw Ghetto, 1940-1943 (2010)
- Doctoral advisor: David Cesarani

Academic work
- Discipline: History
- Sub-discipline: Holocaust studies
- Website: Katarzyna Person publications on Academia.edu

Katarzyna Person is a Polish historian. Her work focuses on Polish Jews of the Holocaust and its aftermath.

== Biography ==
Born in 1982, Person is the daughter of Polish journalist and politician Andrzej Person. She grew up and lives in Warsaw where she studied journalism at the University of Warsaw. In 2010 under the supervision of David Cesarani she obtained a PhD in history at the University of London for her thesis on aspects of the Jews in the Warsaw Ghetto. She received a postdoctoral fellowship from the Alexander von Humboldt Foundation (2016-2017, Institute of Contemporary History (Munich)) during which she worked on a project exploring relations between Polish and Jewish Displaced Persons in postwar Germany, focusing in particular on Bavaria, and postdoctoral fellowships from the International Institute for Holocaust Research in Yad Vashem, the Center for Jewish History in New York City and the Fondation pour la Mémoire de la Shoah (Foundation for the Memory of Shoah) in Paris., and a Maria Skłodowska-Curie fellowship in the Horizon Europe Programme (2020-2022, LMU Munich), a fellowship from the Gerda Henkel Foundation (2022-2023, LMU Munich).

As head of the scientific department of the Jewish Historical Institute, she coordinated the publication of the complete edition of the Ringelblum Archive. She still coordinates the English edition of this archival collection. In 2020, she obtained a habilitation in history based on the thesis entitled Dipisi. Polish Jews in the American and British Occupation Zones of Germany, 1945–1948 at the Tadeusz Manteuffel Institute of History of the Polish Academy of Sciences. In 2024 Person was appointed deputy director of the Warsaw Ghetto Museum and continues (as of 2024) to head the scientific department of the Emanuel Ringelblum Jewish Historical Institute. Person is director of the Full Edition of the Ringelblum Archive publication project at the Jewish Historical Institute in Warsaw.

== Awards ==
Person was awarded a 2024 $300,000 Dan David Prize for her work on Holocaust archives and the recovery of marginalized voices at the Warsaw Ghetto Museum. For her book Policemen: the image of the Jewish Order Service in the Warsaw Ghetto, she was nominated for the 2019 Polityka Historical Awards and the Kazimierz Moczarski Historical Award.

== Publications (selection) ==
- Industrial Concentration Camp. The Camp, the Children, the Trials (with Johannes-Dieter Steinert) (London: Palgrave Macmillian, 2023; ISBN 978-3-031-13947-5)
- Polnische Juden in der amerikanischen und der britischen Besatzungszone Deutschlands, 1945–1948 (Wiesbaden: Harrassowitz Verlag, 202; ISBN 978-3-447-12100-2)
- Warsaw Ghetto Police. Jewish Order Service during the Nazi Occupation (Ithaca: Cornell University Press in association with USHMM, 2021; ISBN 978-1-5017-5407-4)
- Assimilated Jews in the Warsaw Ghetto, 1940-1943 (Syracuse University Press, Syracuse, 2014; ISBN 978-0-8156-3334-1)
- Polish Jews in the American and British Occupation Zones of Germany, 1945-1948 (Emanuel Ringelblum Jewish Historical Institute, Warsaw, 2019; ISBN 978-83-65254-91-7)
- Policemen: The Image of the Jewish Order Service in the Warsaw Ghetto (Emanuel Ringelblum Jewish Historical Institute, Warsaw, 2018; ISBN 978-83-65254-78-8)
- Warsaw Ghetto Police: The Jewish Order Service during the Nazi Occupation (Cornell University Press in association with United States Holocaust Memorial Museum, 2021) ISBN 978-1-5017-5407-4 doi:10.4000/temoigner.11519
- Przemysłowa Concentration Camp. The Camp. The Children. The Trials (with Johannes-Dieter Steinert; Palgrave Macmillan 2023 ISBN 978-3-031-13947-5, 978-3-031-13949-9)
- Seeking Accountability for Nazi and War Crimes in East and Central Europe: A People’s Justice? - Rochester Studies in East and Central Europe contributing author with Eric Le Bourhis (editor) et al. (Boydell & Brewer Ltd 2022 ISBN 978-1-64825-041-5)
- Jews from Poland and Jewish Honor Courts as Spaces of Retribution in the Immediate Postwar World, 1945–48 (Journal:Revue d’Histoire de la Shoah Cairn.Info, 2021/2 No 214 pp55–69)
- Pawiak Prison and the Jewish Community of Warsaw Under Nazi Occupation (1939-1944) (Academia 2023. In Hebrew).
