= Albert Stankowski =

Polish historian

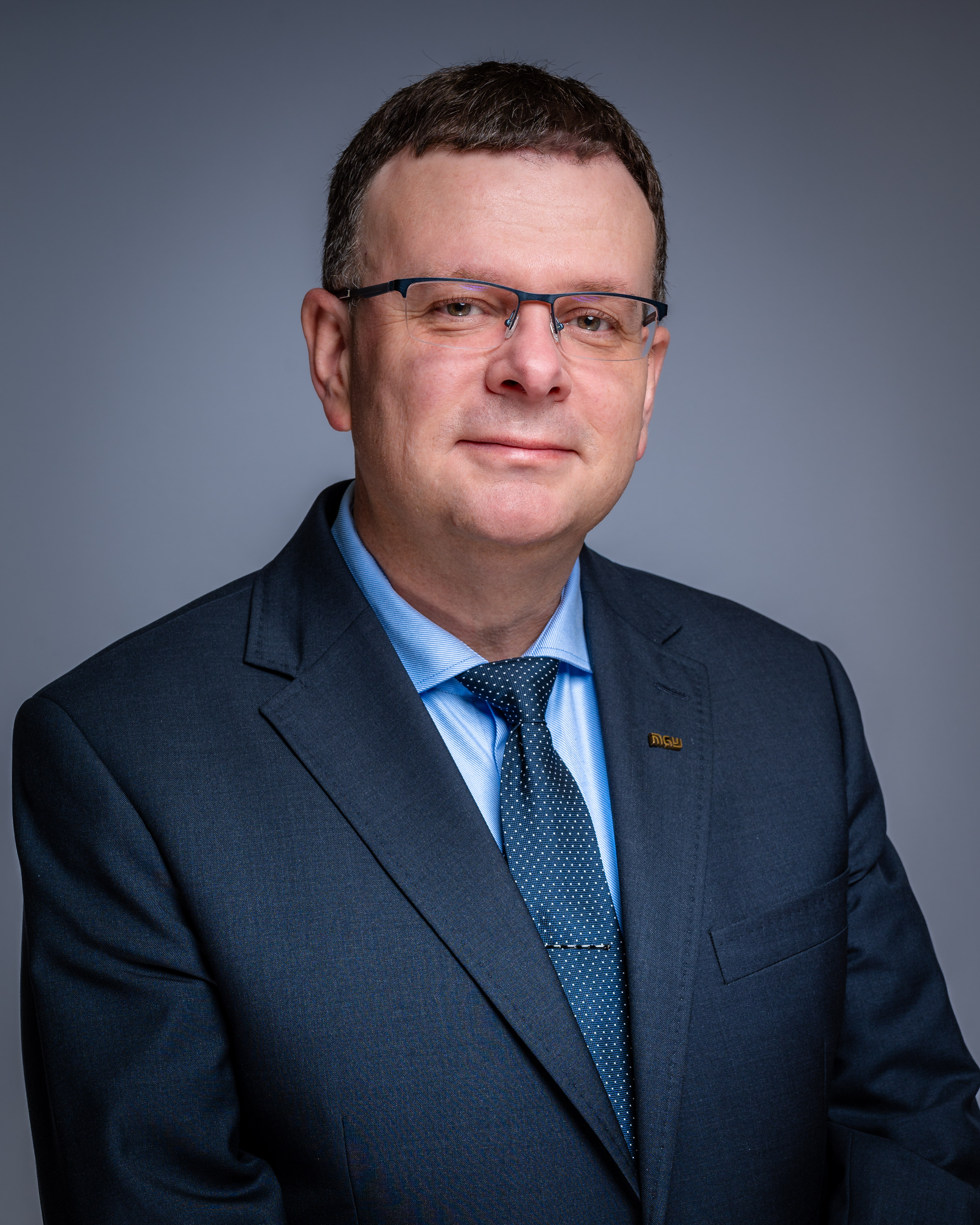
- Portrait of Stankowski, 2024
- Born: 1971 (age 54–55); Szczecin, Szczecin Voivodeship, Polish People's Republic

Academic background
- Education: University of Warsaw

Academic work
- Discipline: History
- Sub-discipline: Contemporary history

Albert Stankowski (born 1971) is a Polish historian and a member of the Jewish Historical Institute Association in Poland (2011-2015). He is a former Head of the Digital Collection Department of the Museum of the History of Polish Jews., adviser for contacts with the Jewish community, and originator and creator of Virtual Shtetl. On March 2, 2018, he was appointed by the deputy prime minister and minister of culture and national heritage Piotr Gliński, for the position of head of the Warsaw Ghetto Museum.

== Biography ==
Stankowski was born in Szczecin to Dariusz Stankowski, a prisoner of Stalin’s camps from 1941 to 1956, and to Krystyna Kot. In 1989, Stankowski finished Mikołaj Kopernik Comprehensive High School in Kołobrzeg and afterwards, from 1990 to 1995, studied history at the University of Szczecin, where he also studied political science from 1995 to 1998. Stankowski continued his education and completed his doctoral studies at the History Department in University of Warsaw from 1997–2001. From 1998-1999 a scholarship holder at the Hebrew University in Jerusalem, in 2001 a scholarship holder of the [United States Holocaust Memorial Museum]. In 2006-2007, postgraduate studies in Management at the Warsaw School of Economics, and in 2011-2012, post-graduate studies in museum studies at the Institute of Art History, University of Warsaw.

In 2001, Stankowski lectured on contemporary history and Polish-Jewish relations at the University of Warsaw. In 2000, he coordinated and sat on the mayoral committee for the construction of collections of stone monuments in Kołobrzeg as part of ‘The Days of Tolerance’ international programme - "The Days of Tolerance - Kołobrzeg 2000". From 2003 to 2007, Stankowski coordinated the ‘Memory Programme’ (Program Pamięć) of the Foundation for the Preservation of Jewish Heritage in Warsaw. Stankowski is also the originator of the ‘Virtual Shtetl’ international multimedia project, run by the Museum of the History of Polish Jews, which he coordinated from 2007 to 2011. Since 2011 he has been a member of the Jewish Historical Institute Association. Albert Stankowski has headed the Digital Collection Department of the Museum of the History of Polish Jews from 2012 to 2015. From the year 2013 he was a member of the International Council of Museums.

From 2018, he was the director of the Warsaw Ghetto Museum.

He is a member of the councils of: POLIN Museum, Pilecki Institute, the Treblinka Museum, the State Museum in Majdanek and the Memorial KL Płaszów in Krakow. In May 2021 he was appointed to the Museum Council of the Stutthof Museum in Sztutowo, in June 2021 to the Museum Council of the Auschwitz-Birkenau State Museum in Oświęcim and in October to the Museum Council of KL Płaszów Memorial Site. In 2022 he was appointed as vice-chairman to the International Auschwitz Council.

== Publications ==
- Demograficzne skutki Holokaustu i Życie religijne społeczności żydowskiej, co-author in: Następstwa zagłady Żydów. Polska 1944–2010, Lublin 2011, pp. 15–39; 215-245
- A selection of documents in: Jewish Studies at the CEU, Budapest 2002–2003, pp. 297–306
- Zerwanie stosunków dyplomatycznych z Izraelem przez Polskę w czerwcu 1967 roku, in: Rozdział wspólnej historii Studia z dziejów Żydów w Polsce, Warszawa: Cyklady, 2001, pp. 355–374
- Nowe spojrzenie na statystyki dotyczące emigracji Żydów z Polski po 1944 roku, pp. 103–151. Studia z historii Żydów w Polsce po 1945 roku. Warszawa: Żydowski Instytut Historyczny, 2000, p. 151
- Stosunki polsko-izraelskie w latach 1947–1951, Acta politica, Uniwersytet Szczeciński, Szczecin: 1999, No. 12, pp. 59–82
- Poland and Israel: Bilateral Relations 1947–1953 [in:] Jews in Eastern Europe No. 3(37), Jerusalem 1998.
- Emigracja Żydów z Pomorza Zachodniego w latach 1945–1960 in: Studia z historii i kultury Żydów w Polsce po 1945 roku, A. Grabski, M. Pisarski, A. Stankowski, Warszawa: Trio, 1997, pp. 83–141

== Awards ==
- 2001: Konik Kołobrzeski, the statuette awarded by the chapter of journalists for the organization of "Days of Tolerance".
- 2010: Golden Star of the National Council For International Visitors (NCIV), USA
- 2015: Honorary Badge of Merit for Polish Culture, Poland (http://www.mkidn.gov.pl/pages/posts/odznaczenia-dla-osob-zasluzonych-dla-powstania-mhzp-5312.php)
