= Scouting Association of the Republic (Poland) =

Związek Harcerstwa Rzeczypospolitej
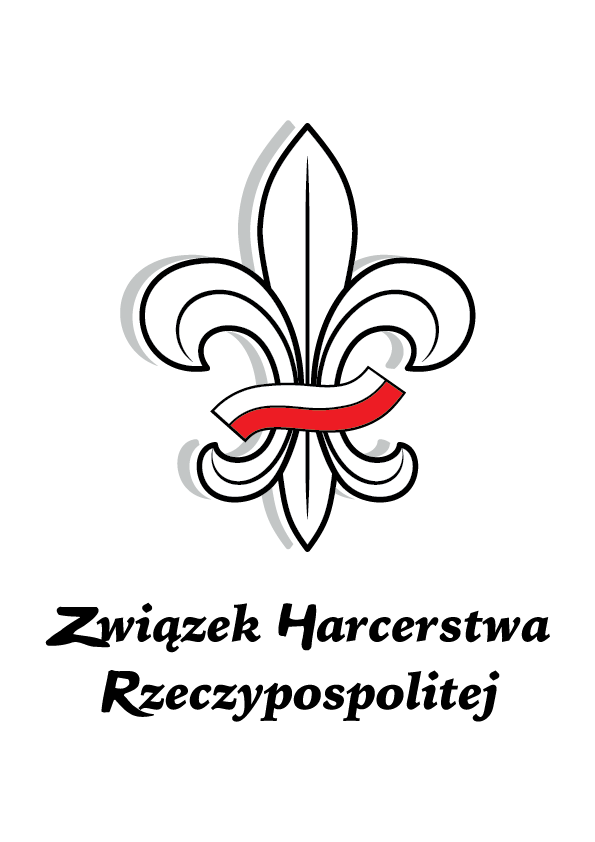
- The Scouting Association of The Republic of Poland
- Headquarters: Leadership Office, Girl and Boy Scouts Main Headquarters
- Location: Warsaw
- Country: Poland
- Founded: 12 February 1989
- Membership: 23 150
- Chairman: Anna Malinowska
- Website zhr.pl

Boy Scout	Girl Scout

Związek Harcerstwa Rzeczypospolitej (Scouting Association of the (Polish) Republic, abbreviated ZHR) is a Polish Scouting organization founded on 12 February 1989. At present, Związek Harcerstwa Rzeczypospolitej has over 23,000 members and is second largest scouting organisation in the country.

The association draws on the ideological traditions of scouting and Polish scouting (harcerstwo), continues the programme, methodological, and organizational principles of the Polish Scouting Association from 1918–1939, and develops the achievements of independent scouting communities operating after 1945 within and outside then communist-controlled Polish Scouting Association.

The association is under the Honorary Patronage of the President of the Republic of Poland and, in accordance with the law, constitutes a civil protection and civil defense entity.

Związek Harcerstwa Rzeczypospolitej is an associate member of the Confederation of European Scouts.

== History ==
=== Origins ===
Between 1949 and 1951, the authorities of Soviet-occupied Poland dissolved the Polish Scouting Association (ZHP). In 1956, after Stalin's and Bierut's death, the communist party youth movement ZMP OH was transformed and renamed to ZHP, the same name the Polish Scouting association had before World War II. After a brief period of easing of repressions, in 1958 many pre-war instructors were removed from the new ZHP or marginalized, and the original oath, law, educational content and methods were changed.

After Pope John Paul II's first pilgrimage to Poland in August 1980, some "non-conforming" instructors inside the ZHP created the Andrzej Małkowski Circle of Scout Instructors (KIHAM), with the objective of restoring the original Scout ideals. The culminating moment of KIHAM's overt activity was the Jubilee Rally of the 70th Anniversary of Polish Scouting in Krakow (September 1981), which attracted about 6,000 participants and was the first mass scouting event in years that was not imposed from above.

After the 7th Congress of ZHP at the beginning of 1981 rejected all their motions and the martial law was imposed in December 1981, they went underground. The underground movement came to light in the fall of 1988. After they were unsuccessful in reforming the ZHP their way, the ZHR was founded.

=== Establishment ===
The process was initiated by a meeting of 51 instructors from the illegal Scouting Movement of the Republic of Poland (RHR) and other alternative groups in the basement of St. Andrew's Church in Warsaw on February 12, 1989. The name for the organization was lent by the Pomeranian “Mały ZHR” (Small regional organisation). An Organizing Committee was then appointed, which began work on the statutes and registration of the association.

The Organizing Committee consisted of: Monika Figiel, Marek Frąckowiak, Marek Gajdziński, Jarosław Janas, Grzegorz Nowik, Krzysztof Stanowski, Andrzej Suchocki, Kazimierz Wiatr, Wojciech Wróblewski, and Jacek Zaucha.

During this meeting, two representatives of the opposition participating in the Round Table talks (Marek Frąckowiak and Wojciech Wróblewski) were authorized to represent the ZHR there.

The next meeting of instructors took place on February 25 at St. Sigismund's Church in Warsaw, where a binding resolution was passed to establish the Scouting Association of the Polish Republic as an ideological and educational youth organization. The resolution was signed by 116 scouting instructors, with more people adding their signatures after the meeting.

On April 1–2, 1989, the First General Assembly of the ZHR was held in Sopot, attended by 424 delegates from across the country. The Congress elected Tomasz Strzembosz as the first Chairman of the ZHR and Krzysztof Stanowski as its Chief Scout, adopted the ZHR Statute, and declared that the ZHR was the heir to the traditions of the ZHP (Polish Scouting Association) from before 1949 and the successor to the achievements of independent groups operating after the war.

=== Further development ===
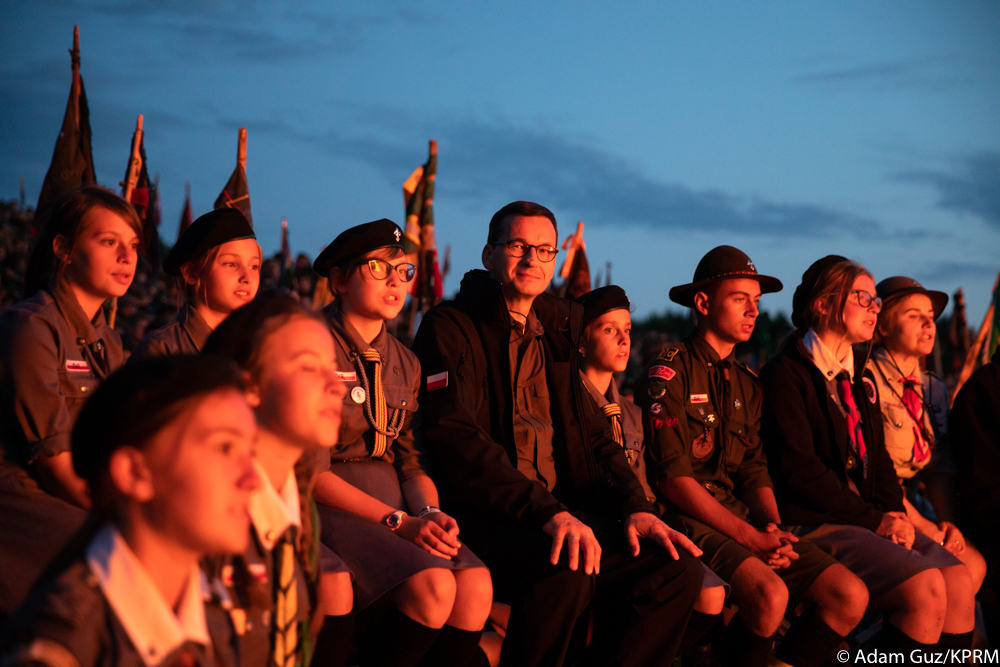
Polish Prime Minister Mateusz Morawiecki among the participants of the Jubilee Rally of the 30th Anniversary of the Association (2019).

Following its 1992 unification with another independent scouting association named ZHP-1918, ZHR consolidated its nationwide structures and entered a period of institutional stabilization. A joint Unification Congress in Warsaw confirmed the merger under the ZHR name, after which unified national authorities were elected in 1993. During the 1990s the organization clarified its Christian (non-denominational) identity, strengthened its statutory foundations, and absorbed several smaller scouting groups. Large national rallies (most notably the 1999 jubilee gathering at Lednica) symbolized its growing public visibility. By the end of the decade, ZHR had approximately 15,000 members.

Throughout its history association combined internal development with visible public service, including nationwide engagement during periods of national mourning, papal visits, and major commemorations. Since 2020, ZHR has focused strongly on crisis response and institutional resilience: it organized nationwide volunteer structures during the COVID-19 pandemic, provided humanitarian assistance following Russia’s invasion of Ukraine in 2022, and participated in flood relief efforts. Marking its 35th anniversary in 2024, ZHR entered the mid-2020s as nationwide youth organization rooted in Christian values and oriented toward civic service and character formation.

== Organization ==
The association is divided into autonomous Girl Guide and Boy Scout Organizations (Single-sex education) which involve:

- Zuchy i zuchenki, Boy and Girl Cub Scouts (7–10 years old) grouped into
- Harcerze i harcerki, Boy and Girl Scouts (11–14 years old)
- Wędrownicy i wędrowniczki, Boy and Girl Wanderers (15–18 years old)
- Harcerze starsi i harcerki starsze, Senior Boy and Girl Scouts (over 18).

The highest governing body of ZHR is the General Assembly (Zjazd ZHR) held every two years, which elects the Chairman (Przewodniczący ZHR) and members of the National Council (Rada Naczelna ZHR) who govern the organization in between the General Assembly sessions. Also elected by the Assembly are the Chief Girl Guide (Naczelniczka Harcerek ZHR) and the Chief Boy Scout (Naczelnik Harcerzy ZHR) who are the respective leaders of the Girl Guide and Boy Scout Organizations and oversee the educational process and implementation of the scout method within the association. Both organizations and the Chairman cooperate on national level and run the association's Executive Body (Naczelnictwo ZHR).

ZHR has a double territorial structure, as it is divided into administrative Regions (Okręg) supervised by the National Council, that assist separate regional Boy Scout and Girl Guide Banners (Chorągiew Harcerzy / Chorągiew Harcerek). Each Banner is made up of districts (hufiec) consisting of local troops (drużyna) for scouts and wanderers, and packs (gromada) for cub scouts. A troop usually numbers 16 to 30 scouts or guides and is split into patrols (zastęp) of about 6 people. An optional scout group (szczep) can be created as a gathering of both boy scout and girl guide troops within the same local scouting community - especially those with long standing history and tradition.

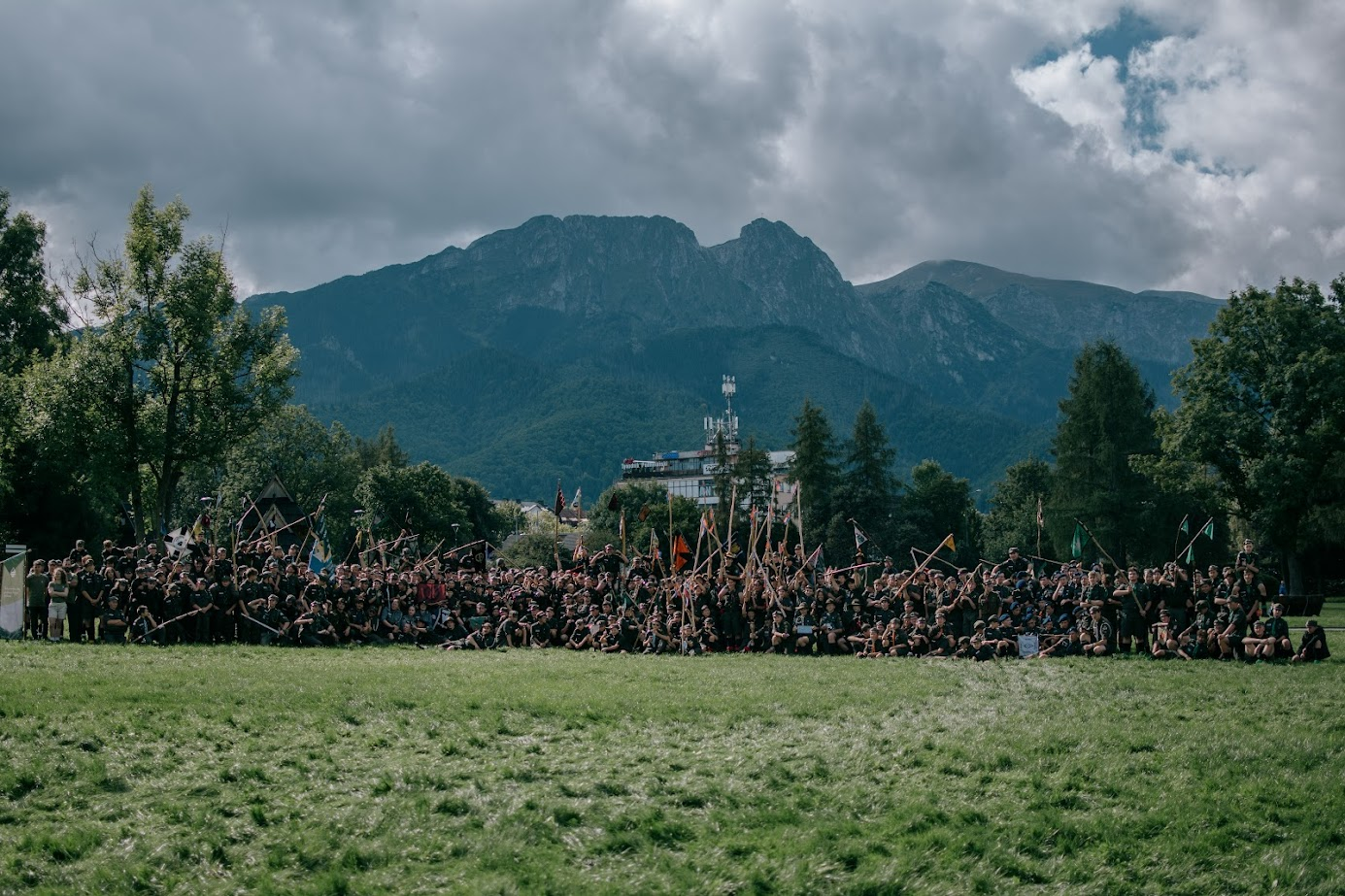
Male scouts from the ZHR at the tournament (2023).

Adult members of the ZHR, after completing the required courses (usually lasting about two weeks) and passing the appropriate trials, can become scouting instructors. Instructor ranks are approved by the instructor committees.

Appropriate tools help in implementing the scout method. The key methodological tools in the ZHR are the rank system and the badges system. The rank system holistically defines the successive stages of scouting maturity. Both tools ensure transparency of requirements, gradation of difficulty, and objectivity in the progress assessment process.

The logo of the ZHR is a white Fleur-de-Lis with the Polish Flag. The logo of the Girl Guide Organization is a modified ZHR logo on a blue trefoil and the logo of Boy Scout Organization is ZHR logo with addition of oak and laurus leafs in the back.

== See also ==
- History of the Scout movement in Poland
