= Adina Blady-Szwajger =

Polish pediatrician and Holocaust survivor (1917–1993)

- Born: 21 March 1917; Warsaw, Poland
- Died: 19 February 1993 (aged 75); Łódź, Poland
- Occupation: Pediatrician
- Spouse: Władysław Świdowski (died before her)
- Children: 2

Adina Blady-Szwajger (21 March 1917 – 19 February 1993) was a Polish pediatrician and Holocaust survivor who worked at the children's hospital in the Warsaw Ghetto during World War II. She later became known for her memoir I Remember Nothing More: The Warsaw Children’s Hospital and the Jewish Resistance, in which she recounted her experiences under Nazi occupation.

== Warsaw Ghetto and wartime activities ==
Blady-Szwajger studied medicine at the University of Warsaw before the German invasion of Poland. When the Nazis created the Warsaw Ghetto, she worked in the Bersohn and Bauman Children's Hospital located in the ghetto. Under desperate conditions she treated young patients suffering from starvation, typhus, and tuberculosis.

As deportations intensified in 1942–43, Blady-Szwajger described giving fatal doses of morphine to terminally ill children to spare them from deportation to extermination camps. After the hospital was closed by the Nazis, she escaped the ghetto with forged identity papers and joined the Polish resistance movement.

== Later life and death ==
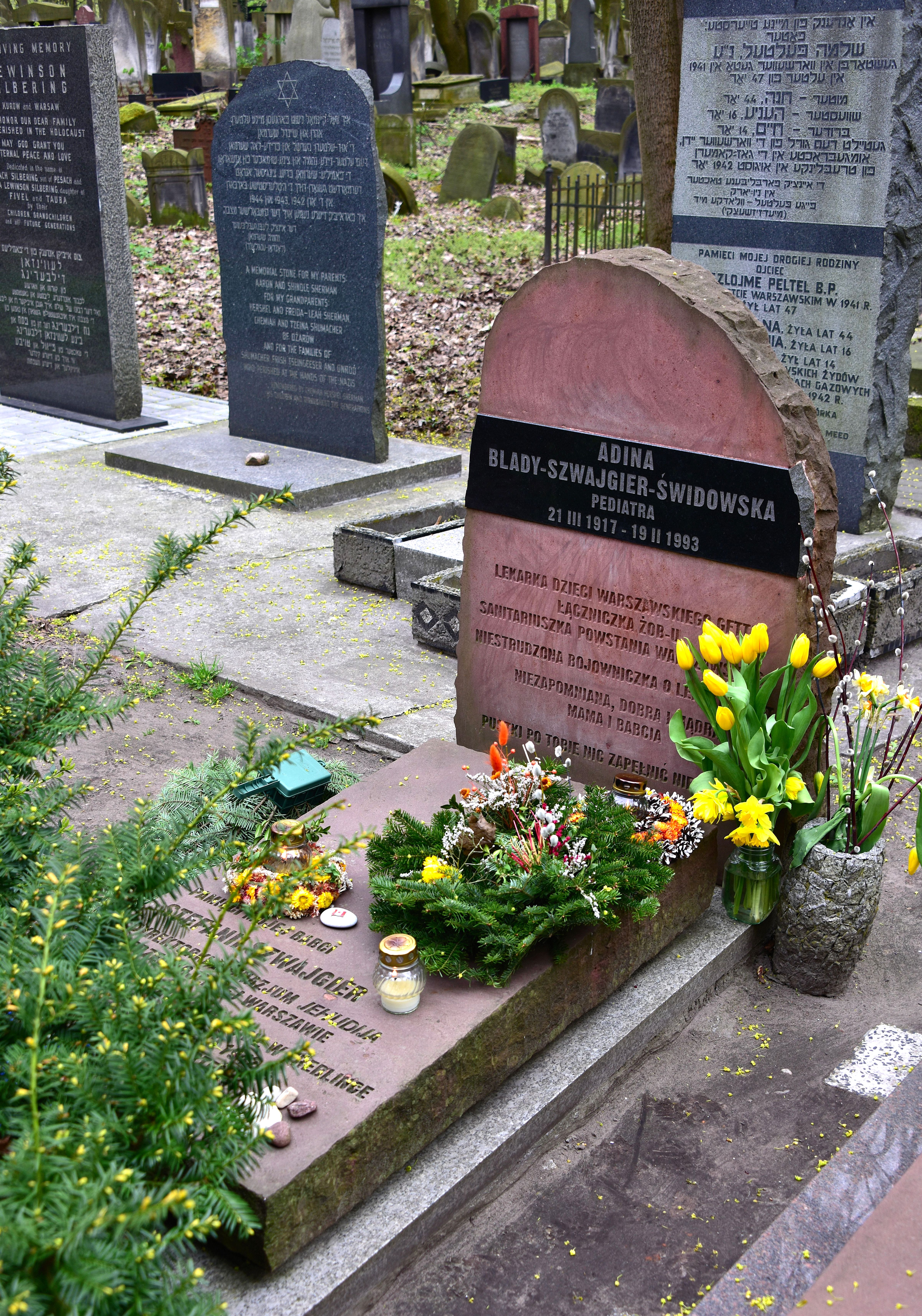
Adina Blady-Szwajger's grave in Jewish Cemetery, Warsaw (2017)

After the war, Blady-Szwajger resumed her medical career as a pediatrician in Warsaw treating children with tuberculosis. She later published her wartime recollections, first circulated in underground publications in the 1980s and released in book form in 1988. Blady-Szwajger died of pancreatic cancer in Łódź on 19 February 1993, aged 75. She was survived by two daughters and four grandchildren.
