= Grzegorz Nowik =

Polish historian

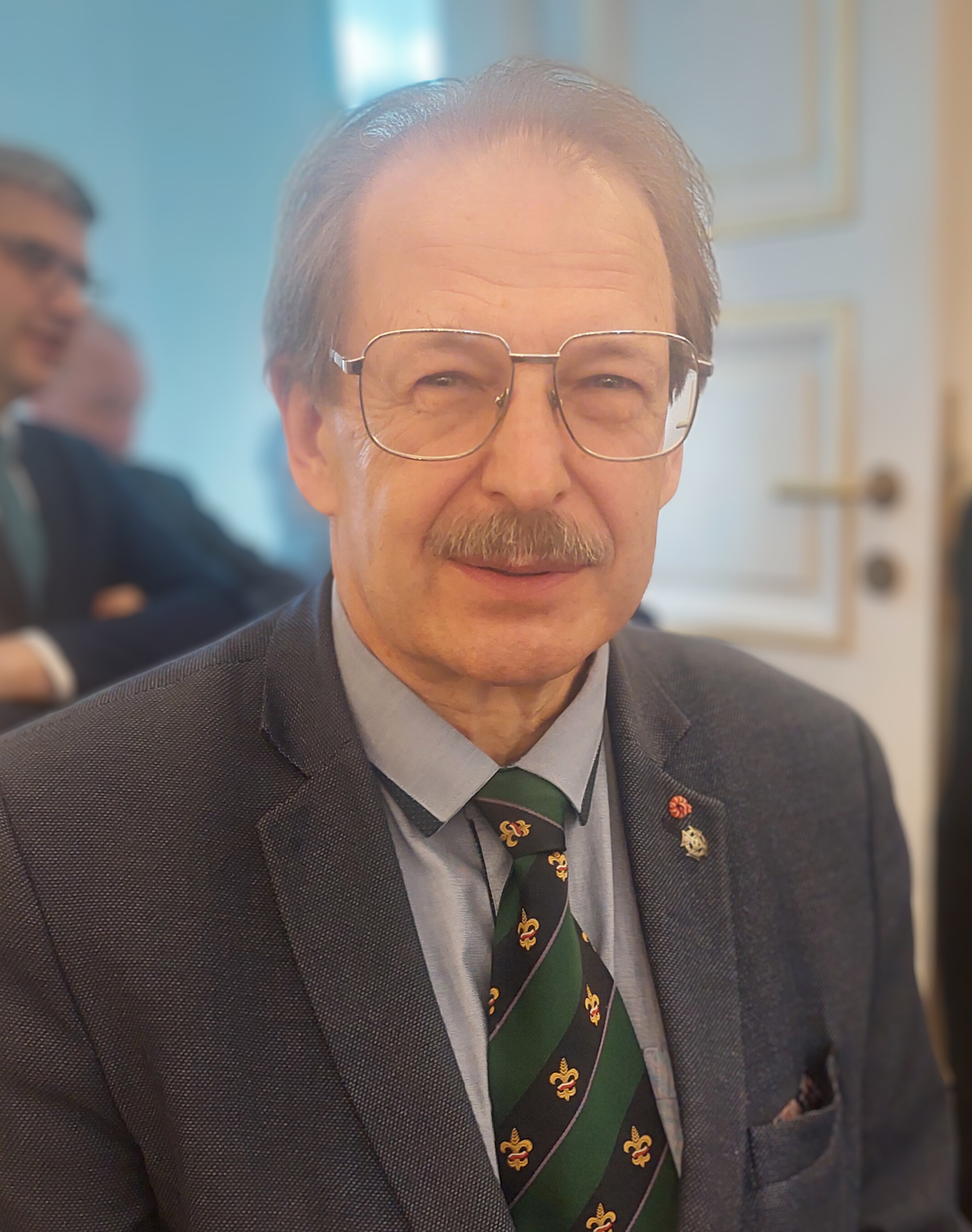
Grzegorz Nowik in 2025

Grzegorz Nowik (born July 10, 1954) is a Polish historian specializing in scouting, scout instructor, scoutmaster (harcmistrz), writer and publicist. He is a professor, habilitated doctor of history and an employee of the Institute of Political Studies of the Polish Academy of Sciences. Head of the Department of History and Scientific Research of the Józef Piłsudski Museum in Sulejówek. Editor-in-chief of Przegląd Historyczno-Wojskowy (2000–2009), deputy director of the Military Bureau of Historical Research (2004–2009), chairman of the Scouting Association of the Republic from 2016 to 2021.

== Books ==
- Nowik, Grzegorz (2008). Ósmy ułan Beliny. Generał brygady Józef Marian Smoleński "Kolec" (1894–1978). Maciej Smolenski. Warszawa: Wydawnictwo Rytm. ISBN 978-83-7399-291-7.
- Nowik, Grzegorz (2002). Straż nad Wisłą. Warszawa: Wydawnictwo Rytm. ISBN 83-88794-55-8.
- Nowik, Grzegorz (2004). Zanim złamano Enigmę. Warszawa: Wydawnictwo Rytm. ISBN 83-7399-099-2.
- Englert, Juliusz; Nowik, Grzegorz (2007). Marszałek Józef Piłsudski. Warszawa: Wydawnictwo Rytm. ISBN 978-83-7399-221-4.
- Nowik, Grzegorz (2010). Zanim złamano "Enigmę" rozszyfrowano Rewolucję. Polski radiowywiad podczas wojny z bolszewicką Rosją 1918–1920. Warszawa: Wydawnictwo Rytm. ISBN 9788373994256.

== Awards and decorations ==
- 2023: Officer's Cross of the Order of Polonia Restituta
- 2011: Knight's Cross of the Order of Polonia Restituta
- 2004:Golden Cross of Merit
- 1993: Silver Cross of Merit

He is also a recipient of several awards.
