= Krzysztof Stanowski (civic leader) =

Polish civic leader and politician

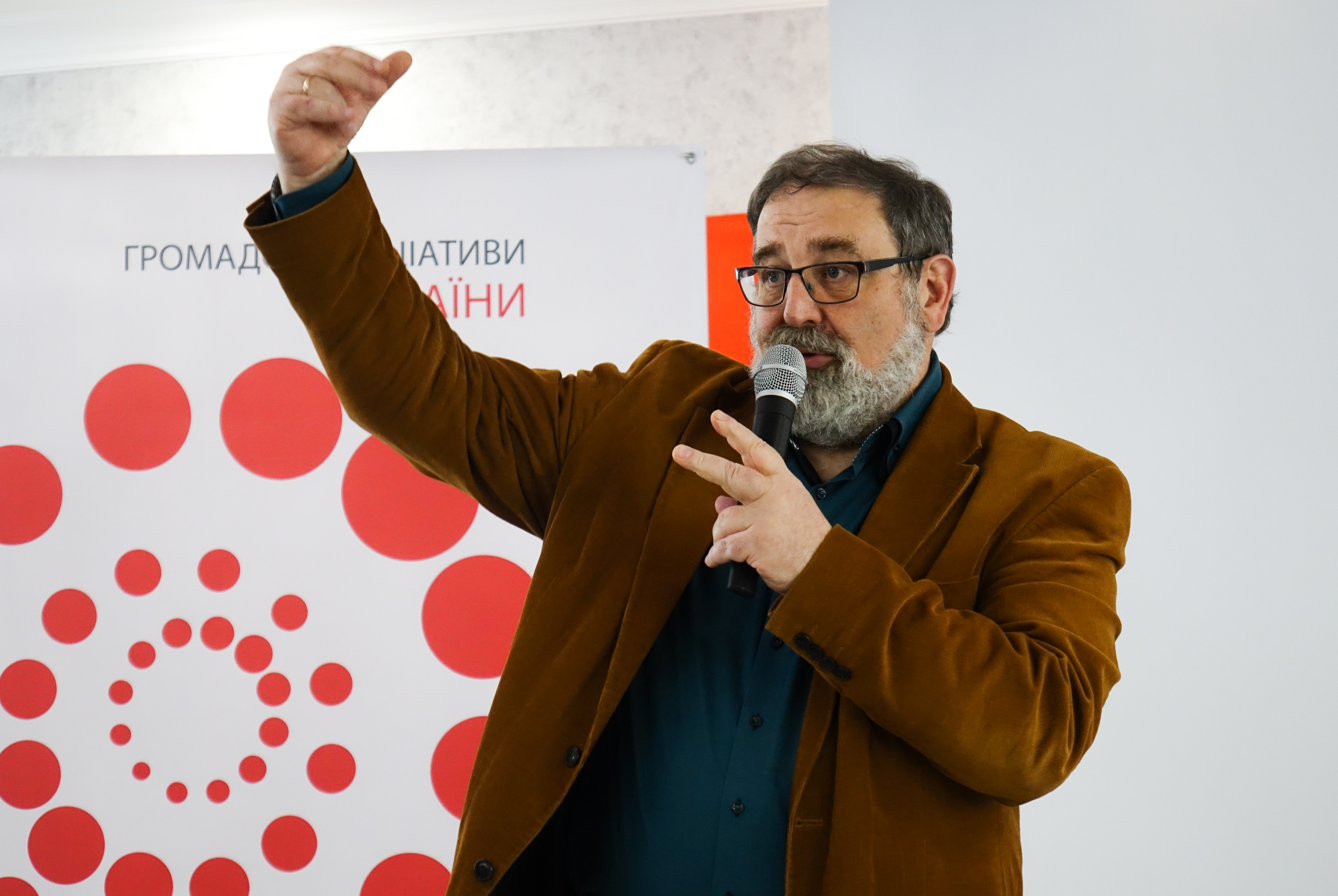

Chief Scout of Scouting Association of the Republic (Poland)
- In office 1990–1989
- Succeeded by: Tomasz Maracewicz

Director of the International Cooperation Centre at Lublin City Office
- In office 2017-

Undersecretary of State in the Ministry of National Education (Poland)
- In office 2011–2008

Undersecretary of State in the Ministry of Foreign Affairs (Poland)
- In office 2010–2011

Personal details
- Born: 12 April 1959 (age 67) Lublin, Poland

Krzysztof Stanowski (born April 12, 1959, in Lublin) is a Polish civic leader and educator. Member and one of the leaders of underground Solidarity in Lublin region after governmental crackdown on Solidarity after the martial law in Poland. For his activity he was arrested, spent time in jail and was released under a general amnesty in 1985. Co-funder and first Chief Scout of Scouting Association of the Republic. Undersecretary of State at the Polish Ministry of National Education and Polish Foreign Ministry (2007-2011).

== Biography ==
Krzysztof Piotr Stanowski was born in Lublin, Poland. When still a secondary school he was scoutmaster of troop of disabled boys. In 1983, he graduated from the Catholic University of Lublin in the field of history.

Co-founder of independent Polish scouting movement at the beginning of 1980s. Founder and later member of the governing bodies of the Independent Scouting Movement. In 1990s, co-founder of the Scouting Association of the Republic (ZHR), where he served since 1989 as the first Chief Scout (President of the Board) and later as the Secretary-General.

Stanowski was the co-founder and leader of various NGOs, including Education for Democracy Foundation, the Zagranica Group - Polish Non-Governmental Development Cooperation Organisations' Platform, as well as a member of Steering Committee of the World Movement for Democracy. Ashoka Fellow. He is an experienced trainer and educator active in Poland, Eastern Europe and Central Asia.

In the years 2007-2010 he was the under-secretary of state in the Ministry of National Education (Poland) responsible for international cooperation, the promotion of the Polish language abroad, and contacts with the NGO sector. Deputy Chair of the Council of Polish-German Youth Cooperation. Between the years 2010-2012 he was an undersecretary of state at the Polish Ministry of Foreign Affairs responsible for development cooperation. President of Solidarity Fund PL - Polish democracy support agency (2012-2017). Since 2013 co-organizer of Polish support for the Revolution of Dignity in Ukraine. Co-founder and member of Civic Committee of the Solidarity with Ukraine.

2017-2026 Director of International Cooperation Center at Lublin City Office. Since 2026 Honorary Plenipotentiary of the Mayor of Lublin for International Cooperation.

== Awards ==
- Officer's Cross of the Polonia Restituta (2006)
- Order of the Polar Star, Mongolia (2012)
- Bene Merito honorary badge, Poland (2013)
- Knight's Cross of the Order for Merits to Lithuania (2019)
- Cross of Freedom and Solidarity (2020)

== Selected publications ==
- Education for Democracy Foundation (with Andrzej Janowski in: Tolerancje Matters. International Educational Approaches, Bartelsmann Foundation Publisher), 2003
- Teaching Democracy in Post-Communist Countries. Journal of Democracy 9, no. 3 (1998): 157–165.
- How to Win Democracy. New Eastern Europe Issue 1/2012.
