= Stroop Report =

Nazi report about the 1943 Warsaw Ghetto Uprising

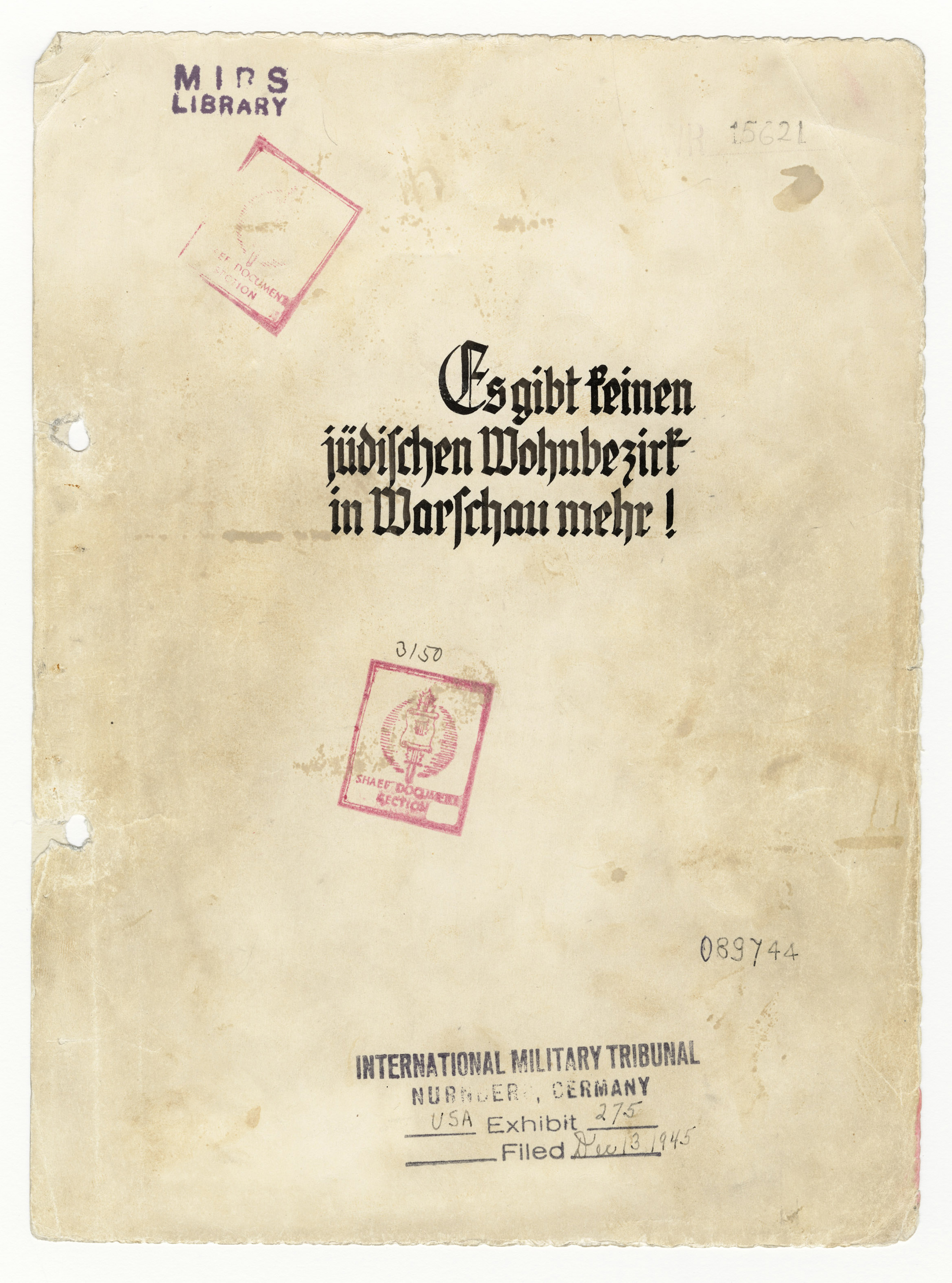
The cover page of the "American copy" of The Stroop Report with International Military Tribunal in Nuremberg markings

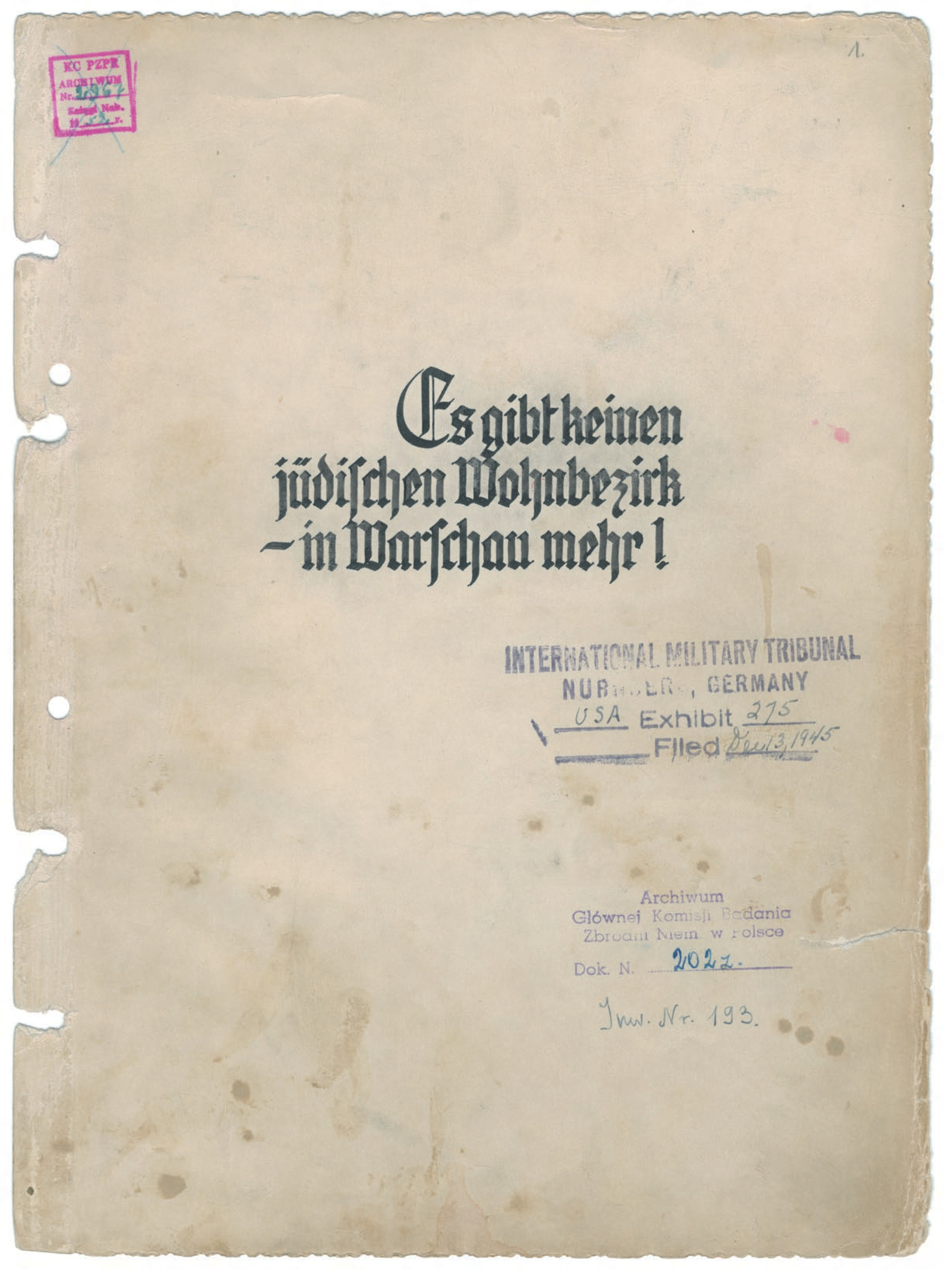
The second copy of The Stroop Report from the Institute of National Remembrance in Poland

The Stroop Report is an official report prepared by Gruppenführer Jürgen Stroop for Reichsführer-SS Heinrich Himmler, recounting the German suppression of the Warsaw Ghetto Uprising and the liquidation of the ghetto in the spring of 1943. Originally titled The Jewish Quarter of Warsaw Is No More! (Ger. Es gibt keinen jüdischen Wohnbezirk in Warschau mehr!), it was published in the 1960s.

== History ==
The Report was commissioned by Friedrich-Wilhelm Krüger, chief of the SS and police in Kraków and was intended as a souvenir album for Heinrich Himmler. It was prepared in three distinct leather-bound copies for Himmler, Friedrich-Wilhelm Krüger and Jürgen Stroop. One unbound "file" copy of the report (das Konzept) remained in Warsaw, in the care of Chief of Staff Max Jesuiter. According to a statement given in 1945 by Stroop's adjutant Karl Kaleshke to US authorities in Wiesbaden, he ordered Stroop's copy of the report burnt with other secret documents in Burg Kranzberg.

After the war only two of the four copies were discovered, those belonging to Himmler and Jesuiter. Himmler's copy went to Seventh Army Intelligence Center (SAIC) and Jesuiter's to Military Intelligence Research Section (MIRS) in London. Several sources stated that the German Bundesarchiv also had a copy in Koblenz. But, in reply to inquiries by Richard Raskin, the Bundesarchiv stated that the third copy of report was never in their possession.

The two known copies held by the Allies were introduced as evidence at the International Military Tribunal in Nuremberg, sharing the document number 1061-PS, and used in the trial as "US Exhibit 275". The report was first displayed by the chief U.S. prosecutor Robert H. Jackson for the judges during his opening address. The assistant prosecutor dealing with the persecution of the Jews referred to it as "the finest example of ornate German craftsmanship, leather bound, profusely illustrated, typed on heavy bond paper ... the almost unbelievable recital of the proud accomplishment by Major General of Police Stroop". Both copies were also used in Nuremberg in the 1947 trial of Oswald Pohl, as exhibit 503.

On June 10, 1948, the Himmler/SAIC copy of the Stroop report and Katzmann Report were handed over by Fred Niebergal, head of Office of Chief of Counsel for War Crimes – OCCWC, to Bernard Acht, head of the Polish Military Mission in Nuremberg. It was used in Stroop's trial at Warsaw Criminal District Court in July 1951, and transferred afterwards to the KC PZPR archive. In 1952 it was transferred to the Główna Komisja Badania Zbrodni Hitlerowskich w Polsce (Main Commission for the Investigation of Nazi Crimes in Poland) archive and subsequently to its successor, the Institute of National Remembrance (Polish: Instytut Pamięci Narodowej or IPN), where it remains. In 1948 the Jesuiter/MIRS copy of the report went to the National Archives (NARA) in Washington, D.C., where it continues to be held.

In 2017, the Stroop Report was submitted by Poland and included in UNESCO's Memory of the World International Register.

== Content ==
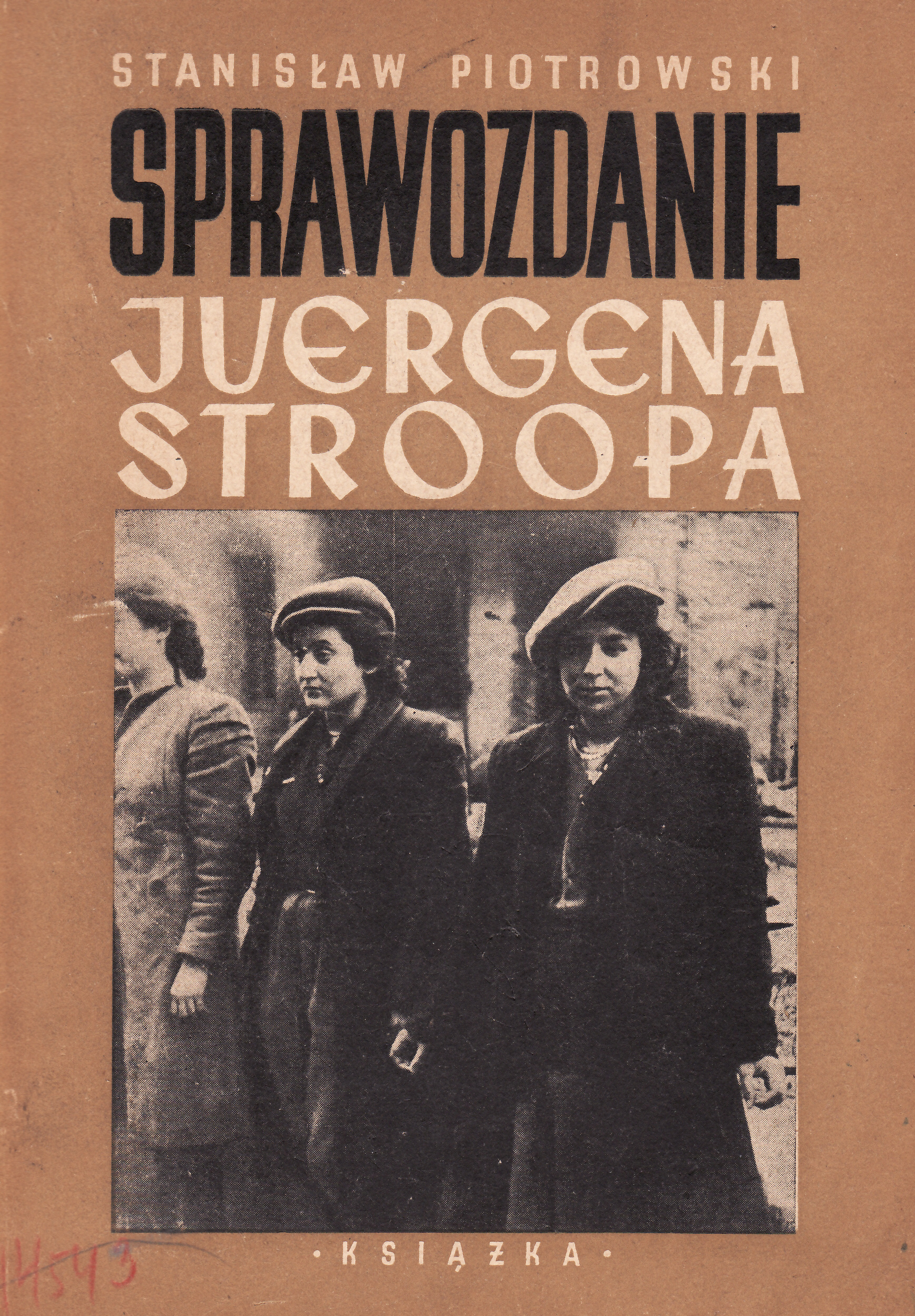
First book edition of the Stroop Report from 1948 by Stanisław Piotrowski

The Report was a 125-page typed document, bound in black pebble leather, with 53 photographs. It consisted of the following sections:

- Summary, with
  - Title page
  - List of soldiers/police killed and wounded
  - List of combat units involved, and
  - Introduction, signed by Jürgen Stroop in the IPN copy
- Collection of 31 daily reports (German: Tägliche Meldungen), sent from Stroop's Chief of Staff Max Jesuiter to SS Police Leader East Friedrich-Wilhelm Krüger. The reports cover the period of 20 April to 16 May 1943, plus a report from 24 May 1943, and all were signed by Jesuiter.
- Series of 53 photographs accompanied by hand-written captions in German Sütterlin script
- The NARA report also has a fourth section with statistics about human losses, types of recovered weapons, and amounts of money and valuables taken from Jews.

The copies have slight discrepancies in textual and graphical layout, and in the photographs they contain.

== Photographs from the Stroop Report ==
The IPN copy of the report has 53 photographs on 49 pages, while the NARA copy has the same number of photographs on 52 pages. 37 photographs appear in both copies, although not always with the same size, crop or order and occasionally with different captions. Sixteen shots in each copy are different, although often very similar, as they depict the same events. Altogether, in both versions of the report, there are 69 unique photographs.

The identity of the photographers who accompanied Stroop's headquarters during the operation is unknown. Franz Konrad confessed to taking some of the photographs; the rest were probably taken by photographers from Propaganda Kompanie nr 689. In addition to the photographs found in the reports, there were about 45 additional photographs that were not included. According to Yad Vashem, these were found in Stroop's possession when he was captured by the Americans after the war. Some of those photographs were closely related to those used in the report, as they depicted the same events. Many of those additional photographs are described in reputable sources as coming from the Stroop Report, even if they do not appear in either of the surviving copies.

The high-quality photographs taken for Stroop constitute a unique documentation of the final stage of liquidation of the Warsaw ghetto. The photographer was permitted access to Stroop's inner circle, to accompany the forces that participated in liquidating the ghetto, and to get close to the combat areas. Apart from a dozen candid photographs taken by Polish firefighter Leszek Grzywaczewski, those are the only photographs of the Ghetto Uprising taken inside the ghetto. Some of them became highly recognized images of World War II and the Shoah.

Photographic captions in the Report are handwritten in the Sütterlin style. The captions contain few facts about the photos' content, and in some cases do not match the images at all. The captions often express the racist mindset of the report's authors. Many of the places, people and events depicted were not identified until after the report's publication.

== Gallery ==
Photographs included in one of the two copies of the Stroop Report. Image captions include a reference and translation of the original German caption, followed by current photo caption. Click on images for more information.

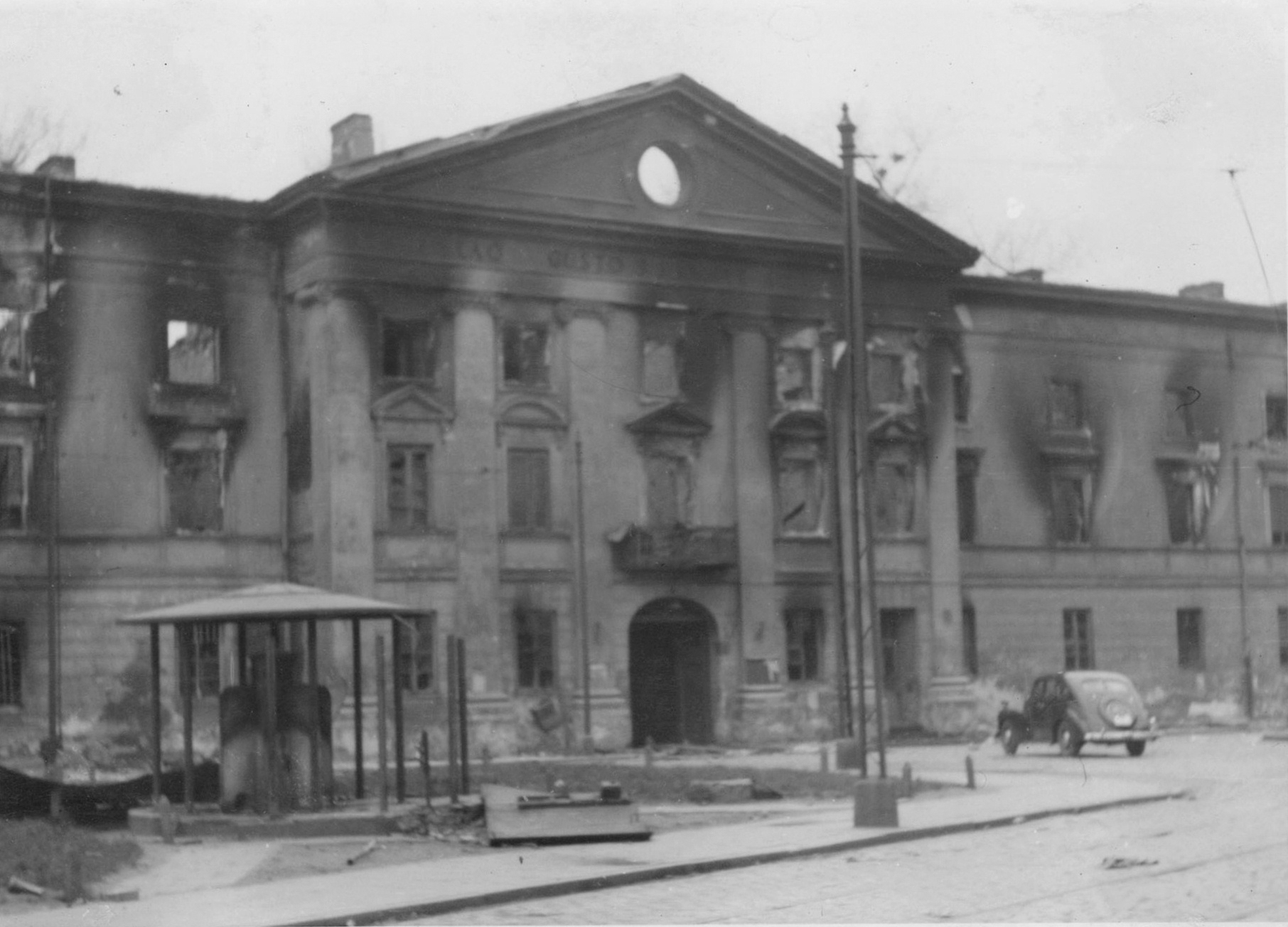
NARA copy #1, IPN copy #1
The building of the former Jewish Council
Judenrat (Jewish Community Council) at Zamenhofa 19

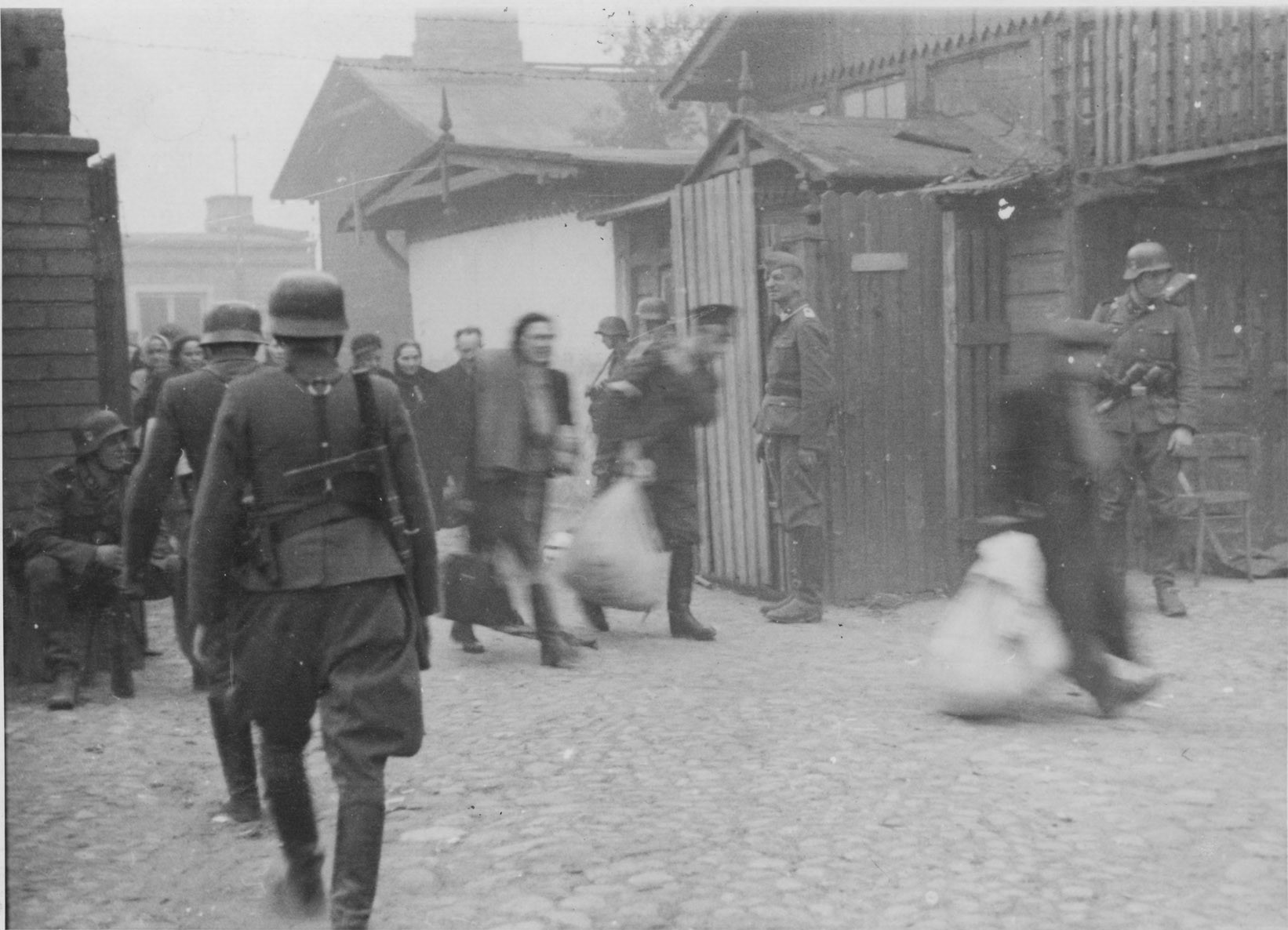
NARA copy #2, IPN copy #2
Vacate the factory!
Umschlagplatz, gate by the bathhouse

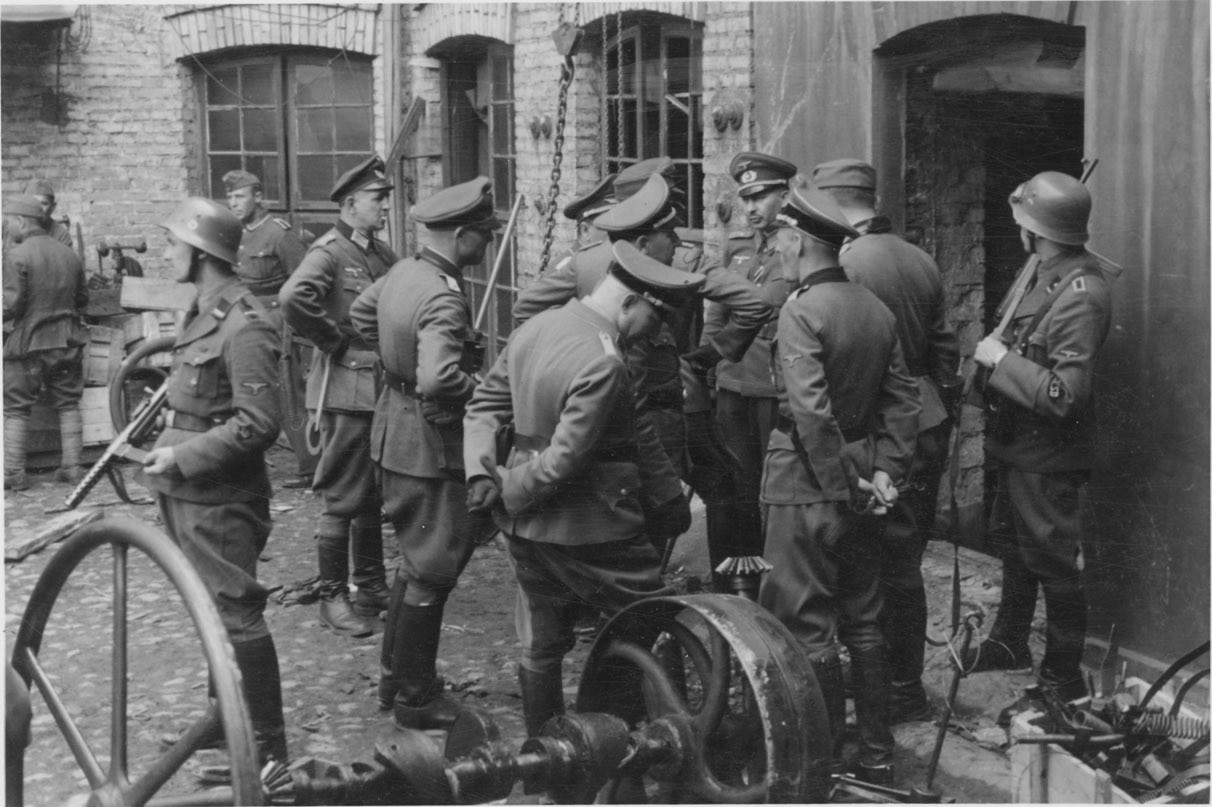
NARA copy #3, IPN copy #3
Discussing the evacuation of the factory
The guard on the left is Josef Blösche. The photo depicts the Herman Brauer helm repair shop at Nalewki 28–38. 24 April 1943.

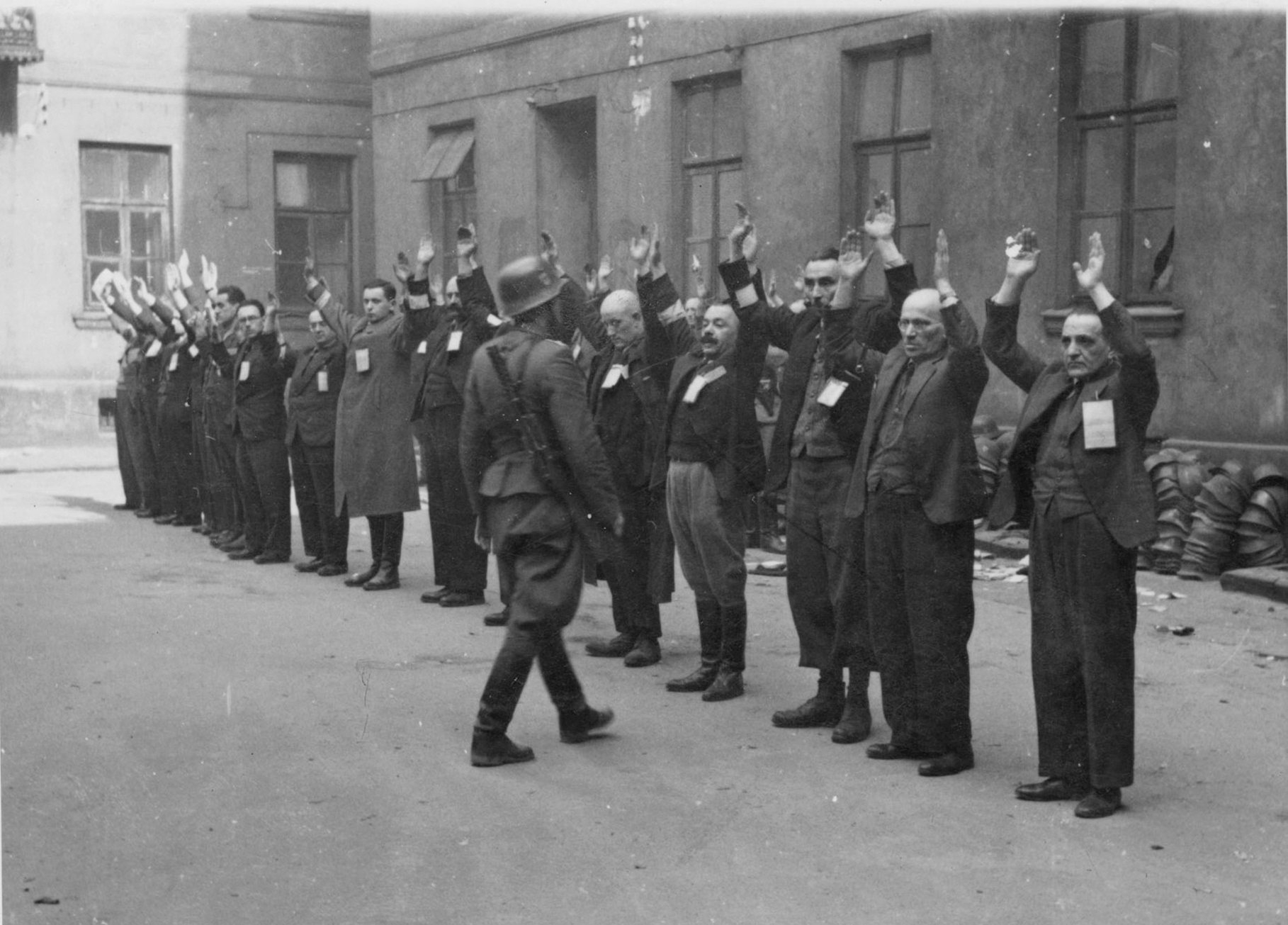
NARA copy #4, IPN copy #4
The Jewish department heads of the armament firm Brauer
Herman Brauer helm repair shop at Nalewki 28–38

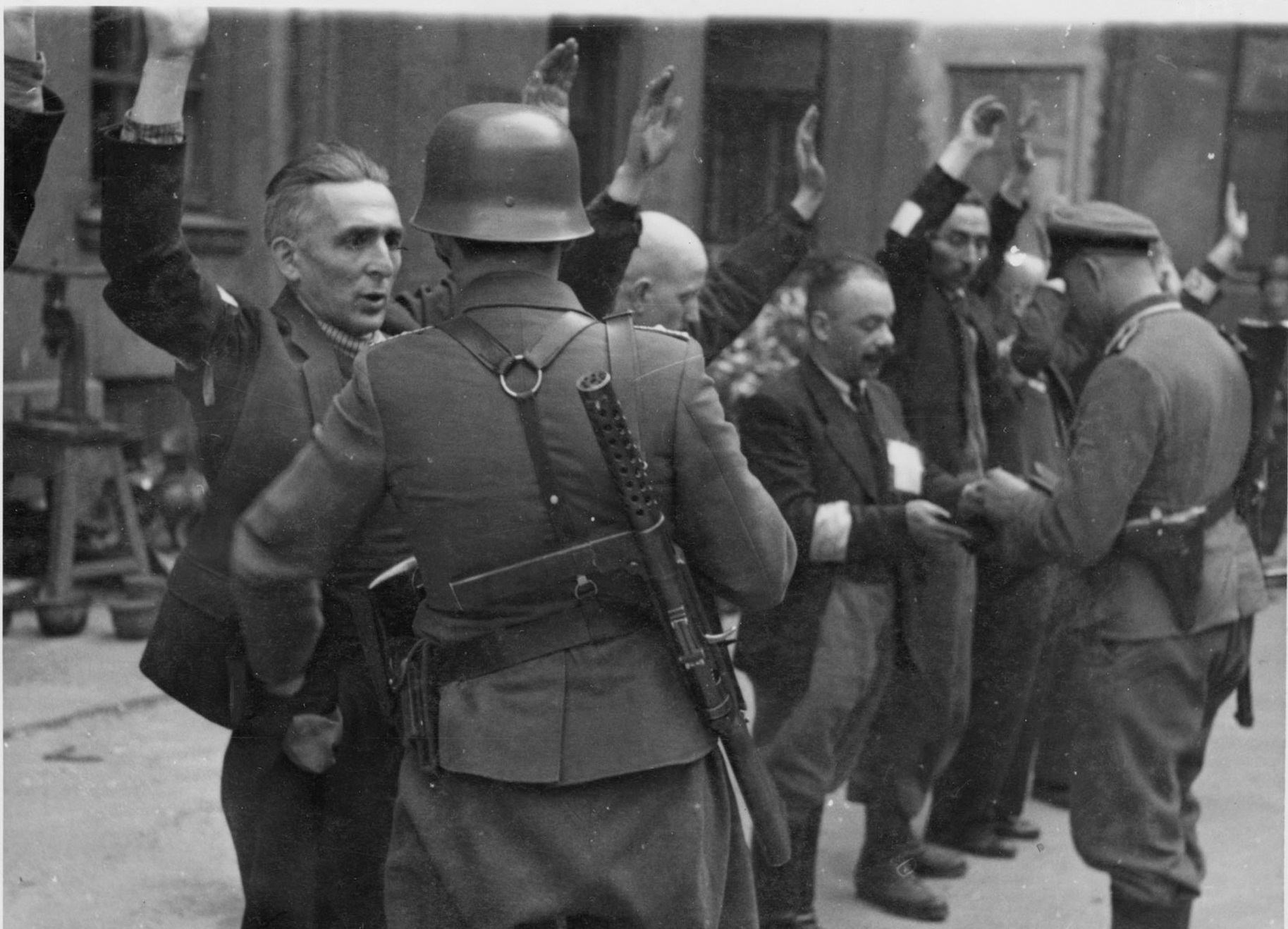
NARA copy #5, IPN copy #5
The Brauer Company
Herman Brauer helm repair shop at Nalewki 28–38

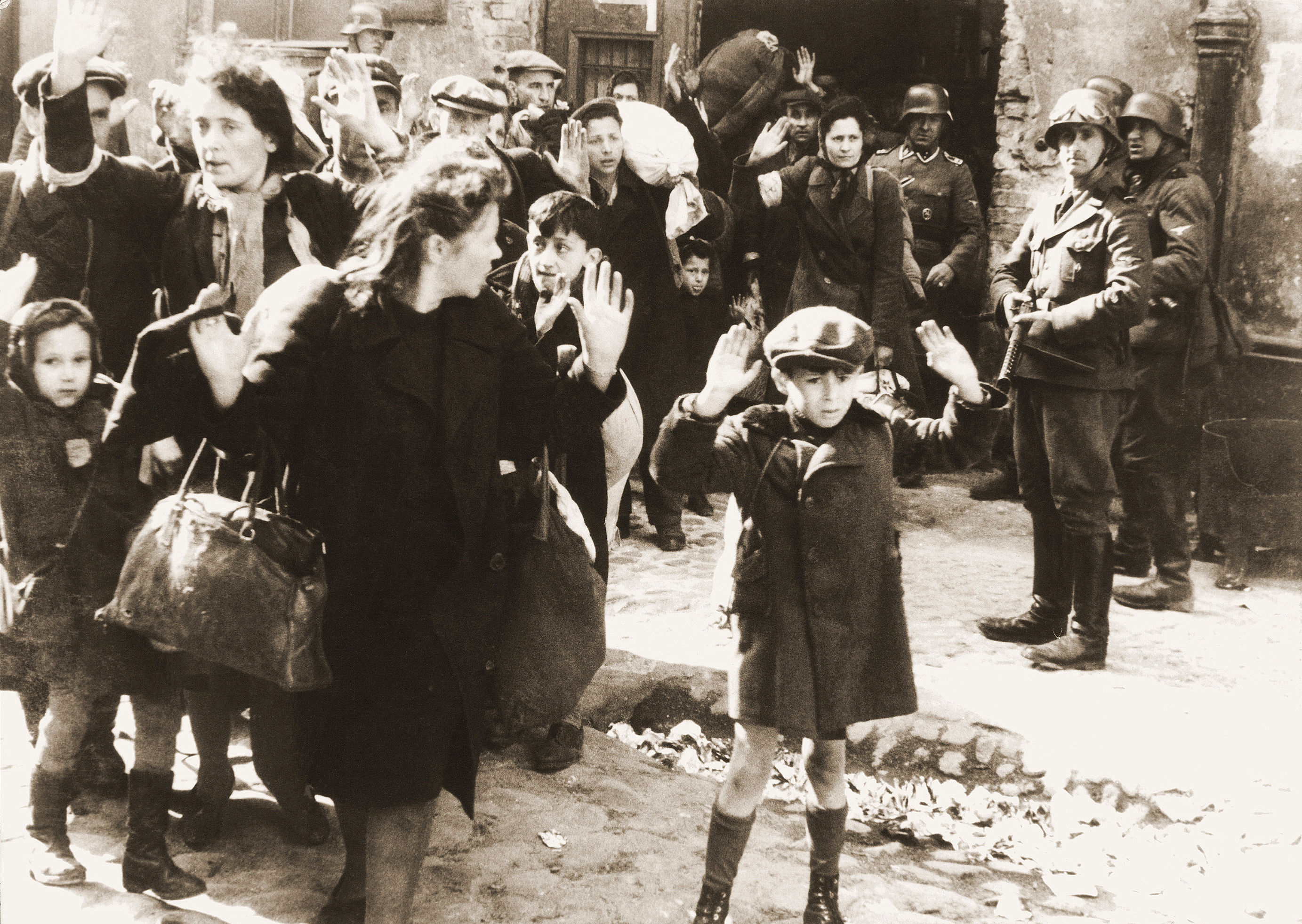
NARA copy #17, IPN copy #14
Forcibly pulled out of bunkers
This well-known photograph was selected for Time Magazine's most influential 100 photographs. Despite the three books written about the image, only the SS man pointing the submachine gun has been definitely identified, as Josef Blösche. Taken at Nowolipie 34.

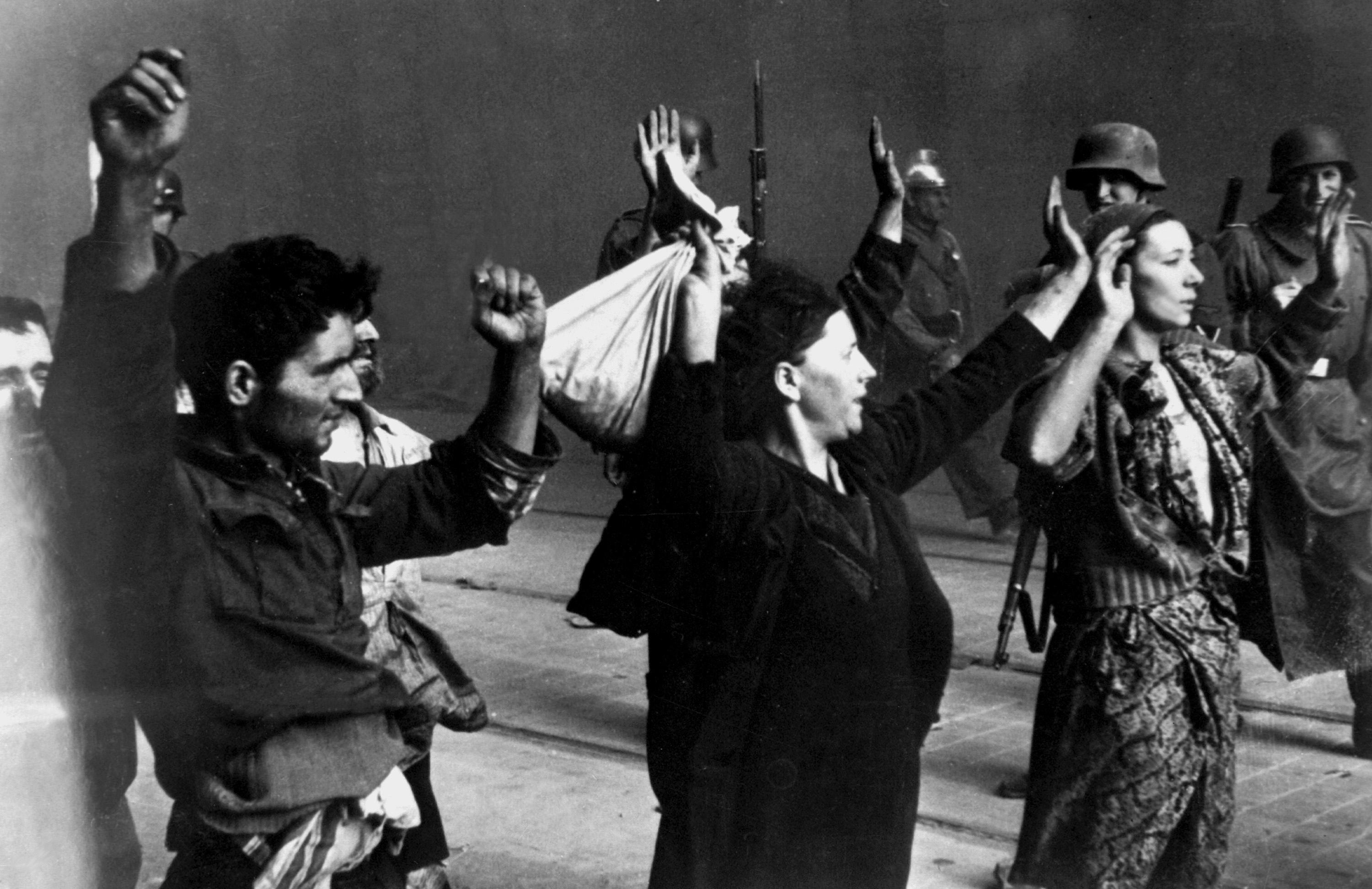
IPN copy #15
These bandits offered armed resistance
Nowolipie 64 near intersection with Smocza

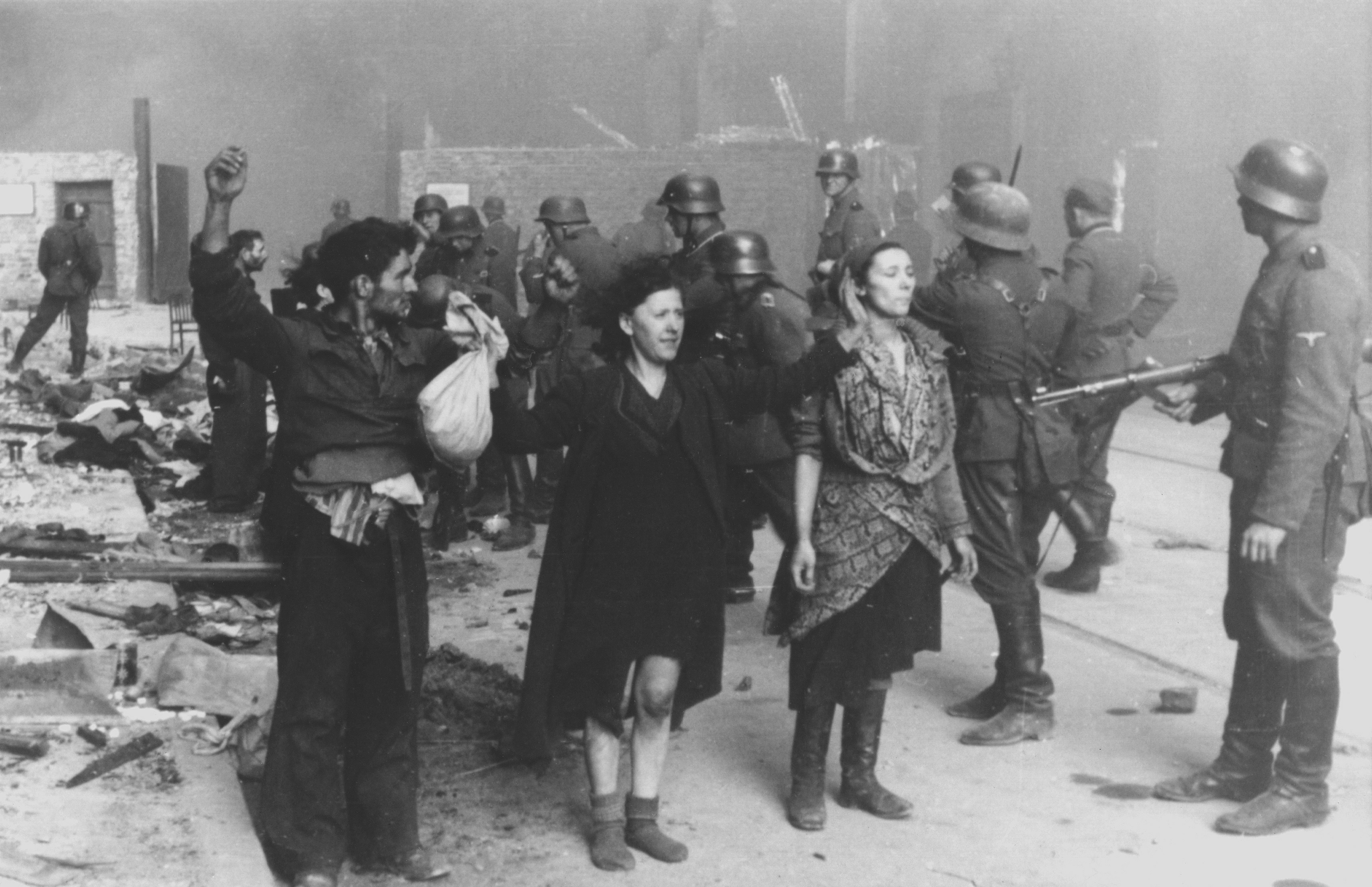
NARA copy #18
These bandits offered armed resistance
Nowolipie 64 near intersection with Smocza.Woman on the right: Hasia Szylgold-Szpiro

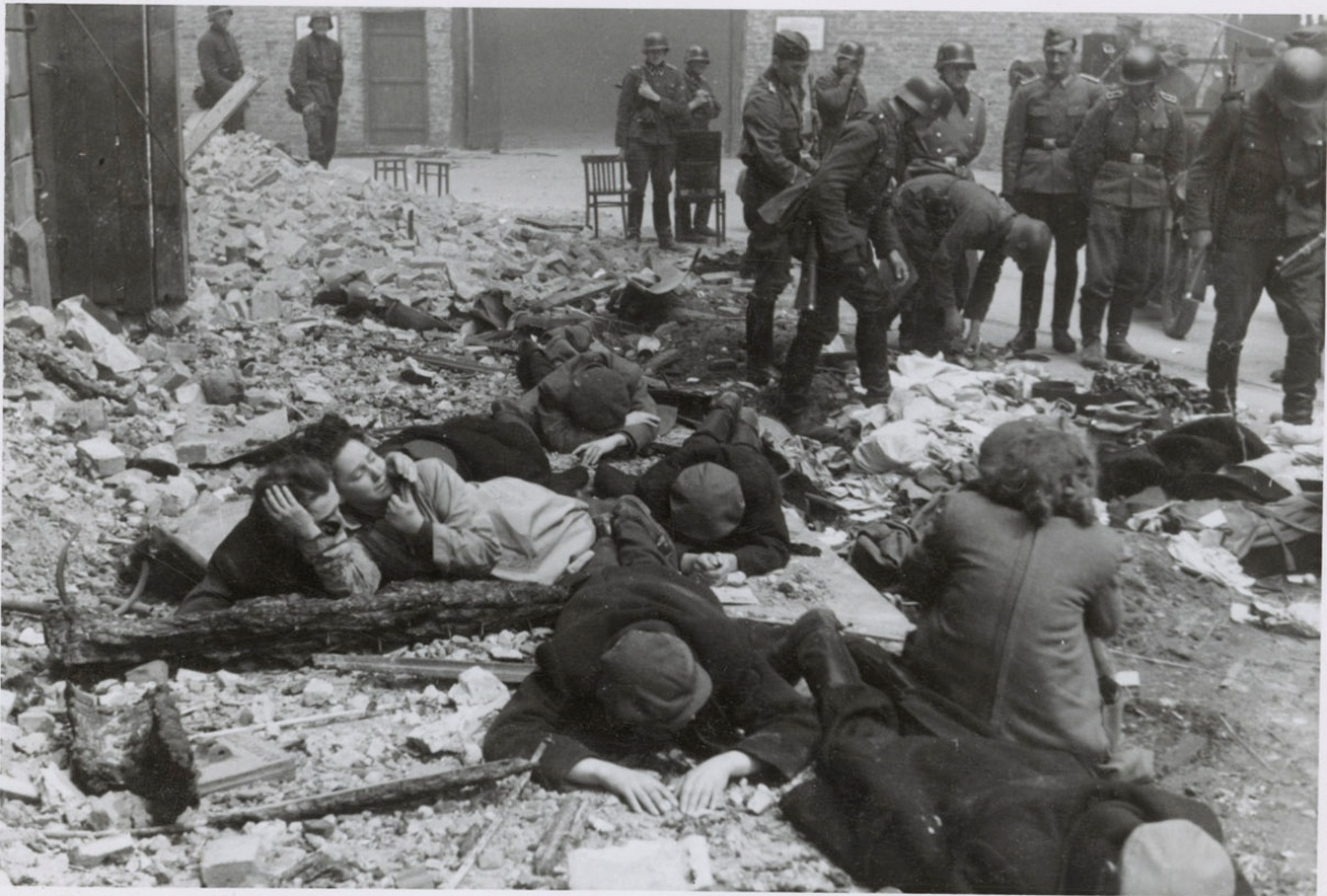
NARA copy #13, IPN copy #16
Jews pulled from a bunker
Nowolipie 64 / Smocza 1 intersection

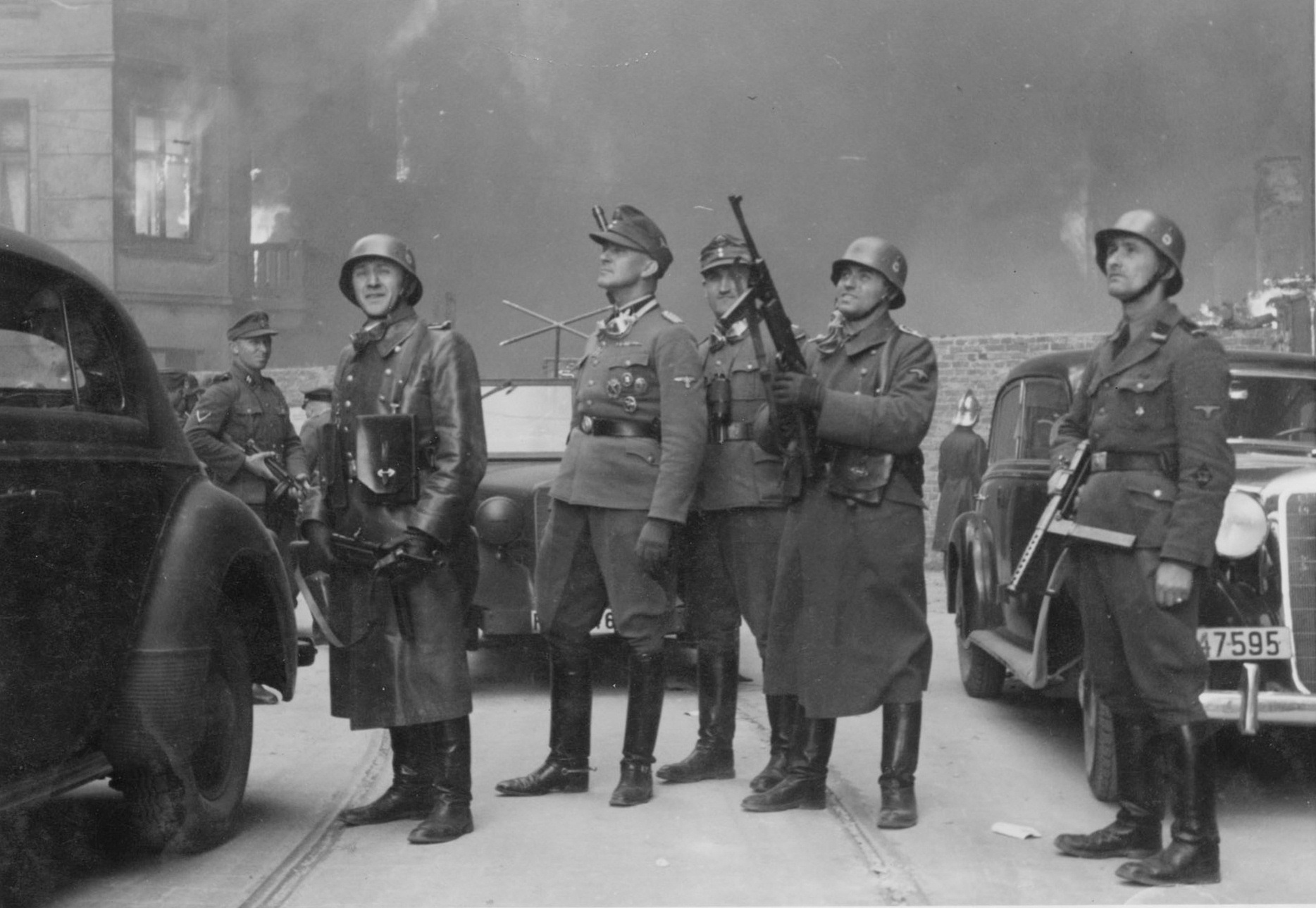
NARA copy #43, IPN copy #43
The leader of the grand operation
Second from left Stroop; background either Karl Kaleske (Stroop's adjutant) or Erich Steidtmann; 2nd from right Heinrich Klaustermeyer; far right Josef Blösche and others at Nowolipie 64 / Smocza 1 intersection

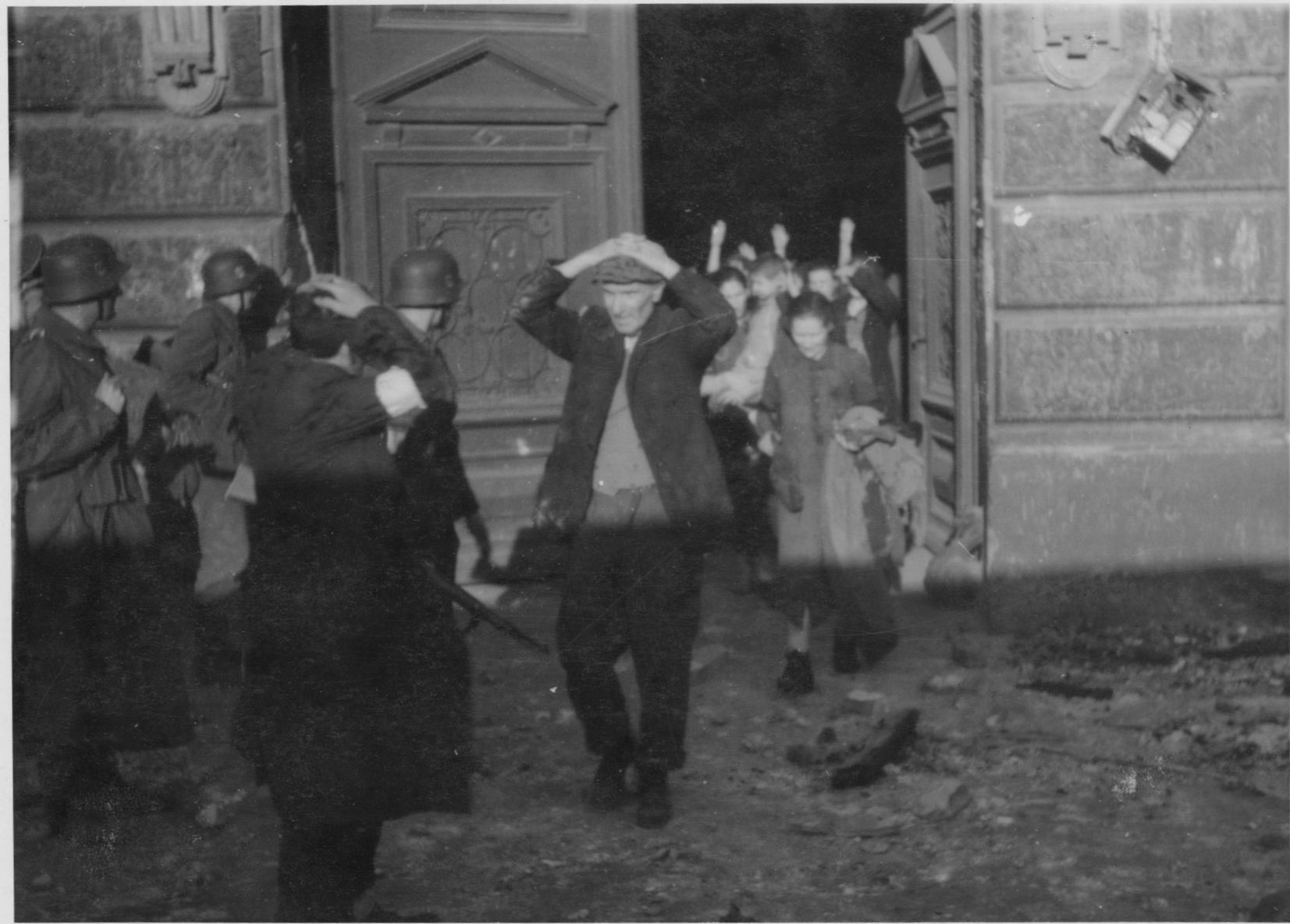
NARA copy #23
Smoking out the Jews and Bandits
Possibly Wałowa 4

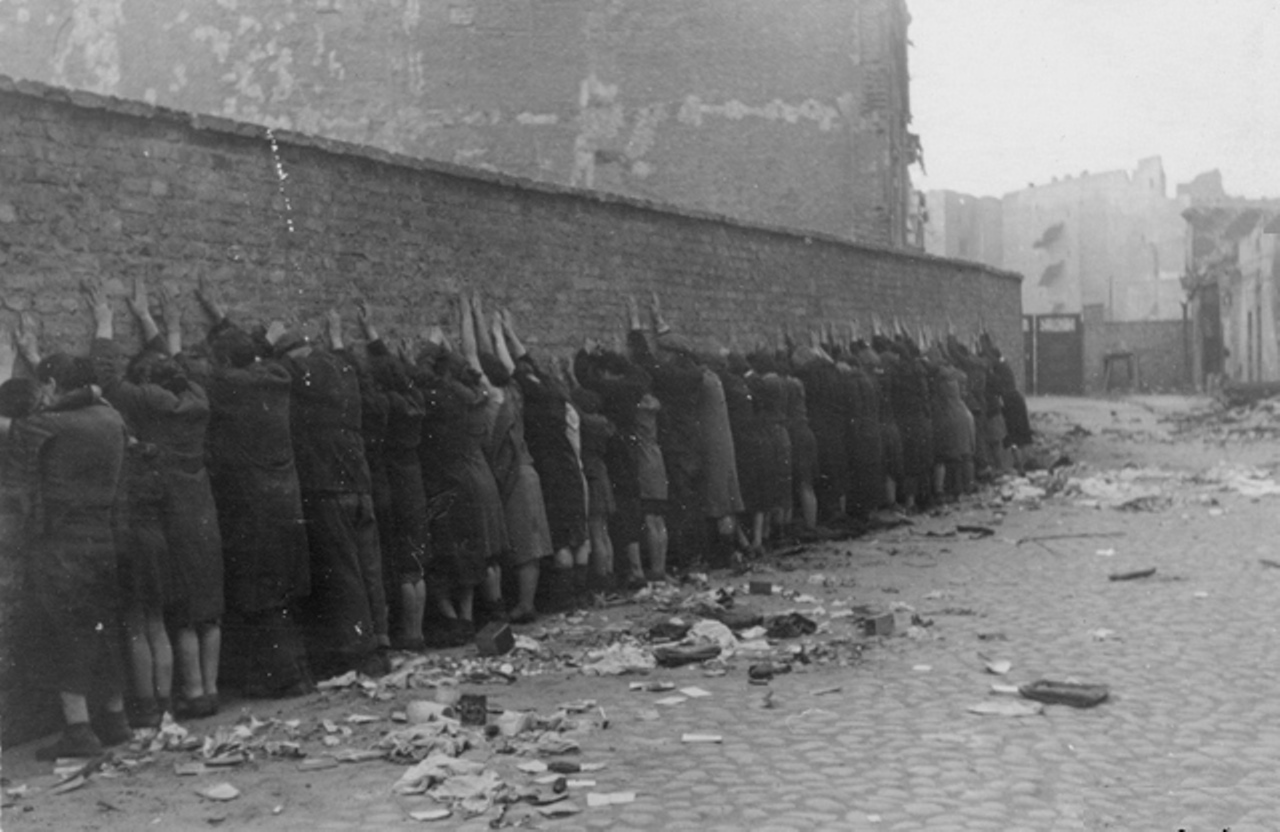
NARA copy #16, IPN copy #34
Before the search
Possibly near Wałowa 4, looking North

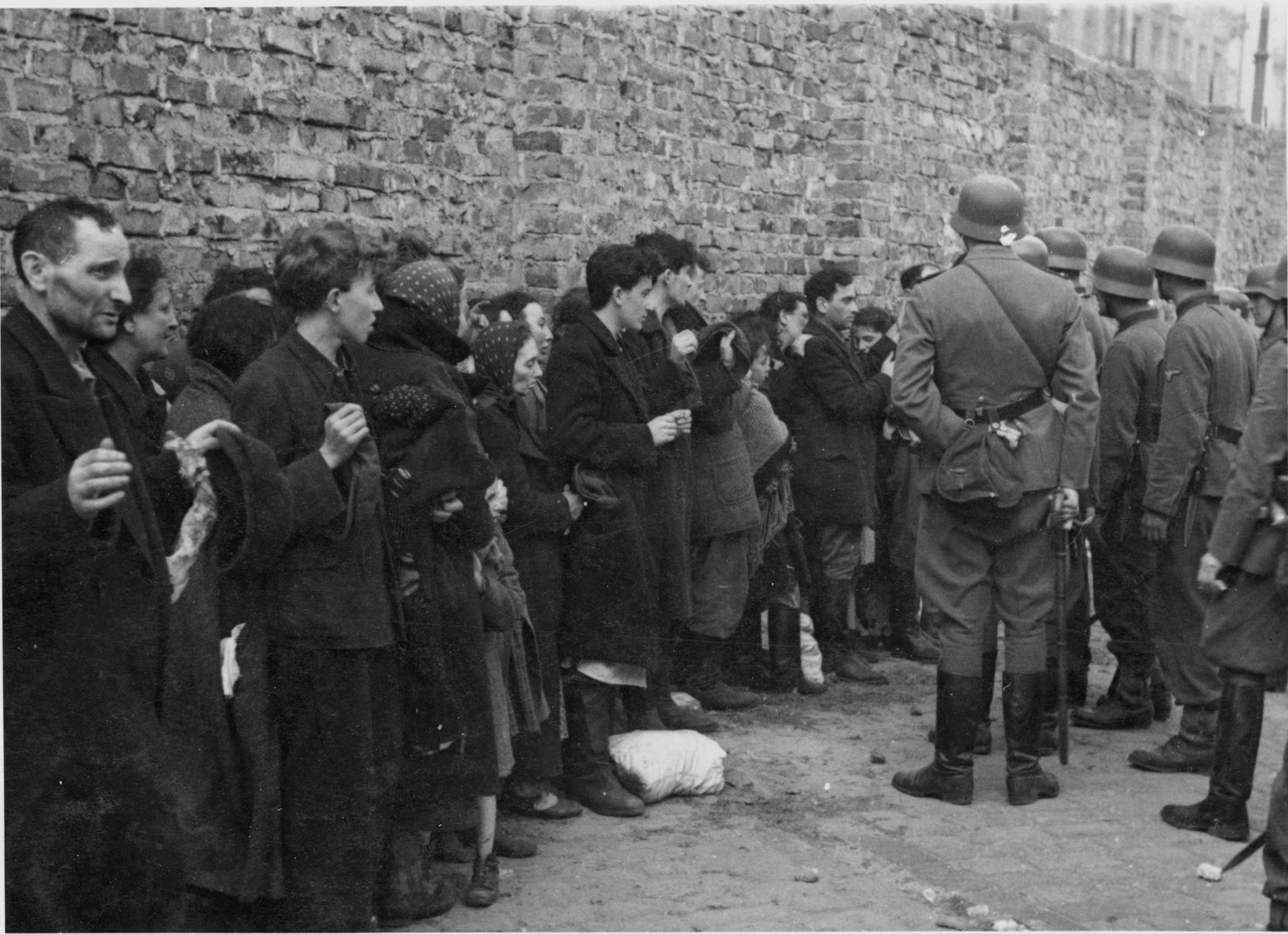
NARA copy #8, IPN copy #9
Search and interrogation
Possibly Muranowski Square with Muranowski 10 / Sierakowska 3 in the back

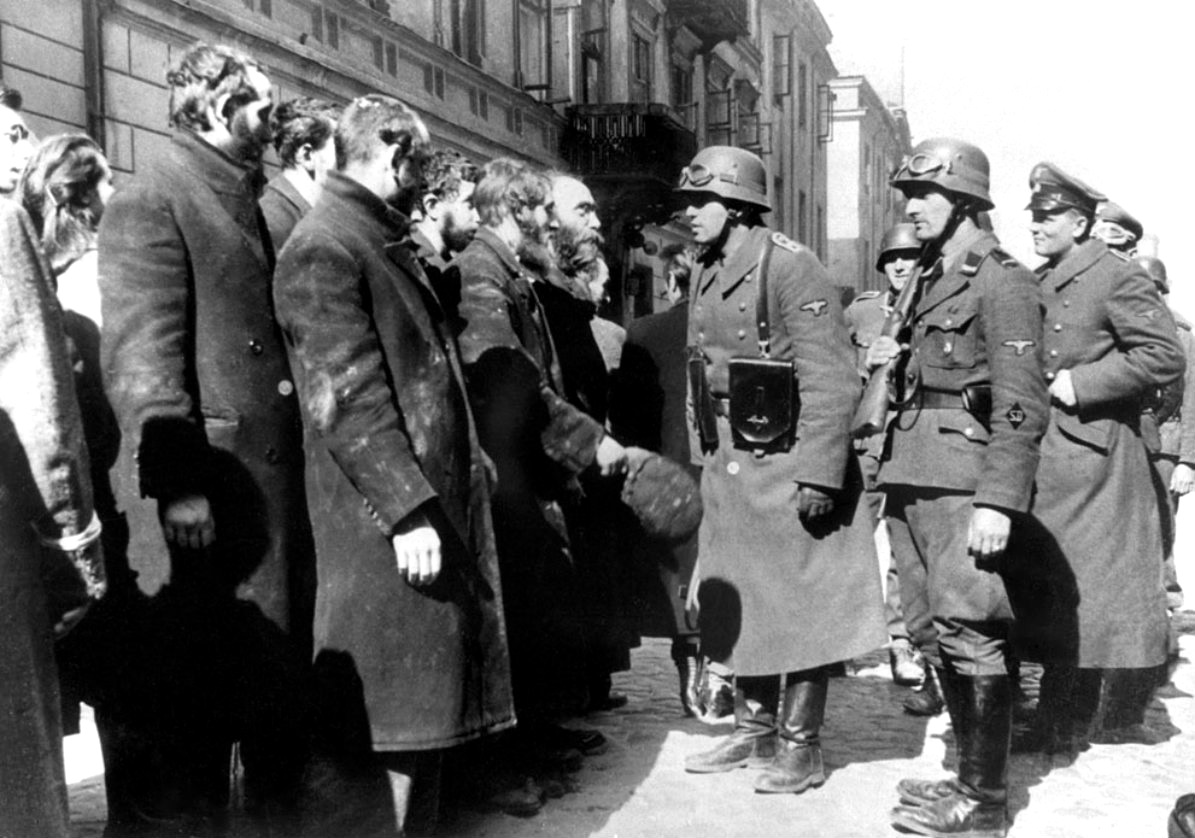
NARA copy #9, IPN copy #10
Jewish Rabbis
Rabbi Heschel Rappaport and others questioned by Heinrich Klaustermeyer and Josef Blösche in front of Nowolipie 32

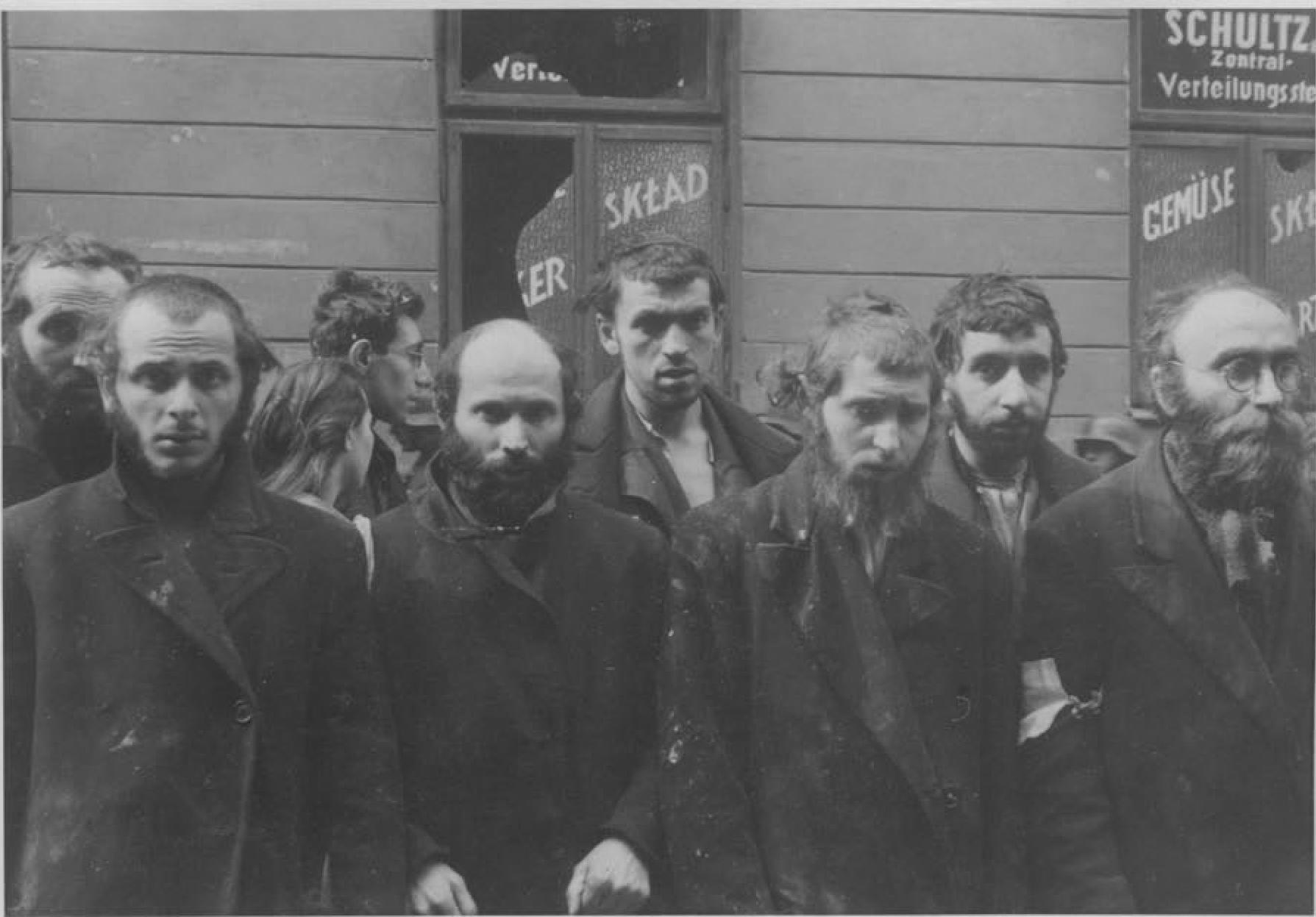
NARA copy #10, IPN copy #11
Jewish Rabbis
Rabbi Lipa Kaplan, Eliyahu Levin, Mendel Alter, Yankel Levin and Rabbi Heschel Rappaport in front of Nowolipie 32.

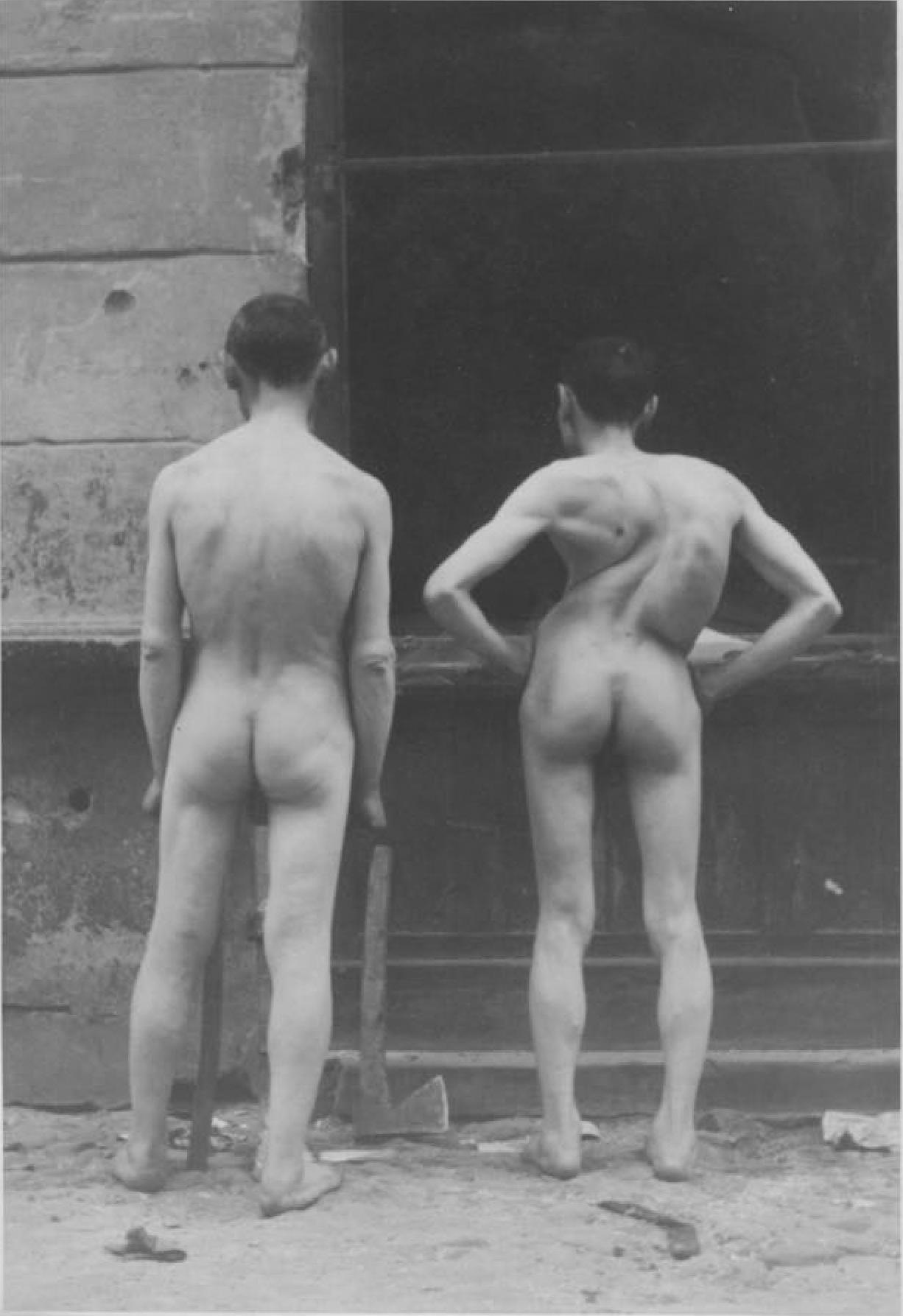
NARA copy #12, IPN copy #12
Dregs of humanity
All the prisoners were stripped during the search.

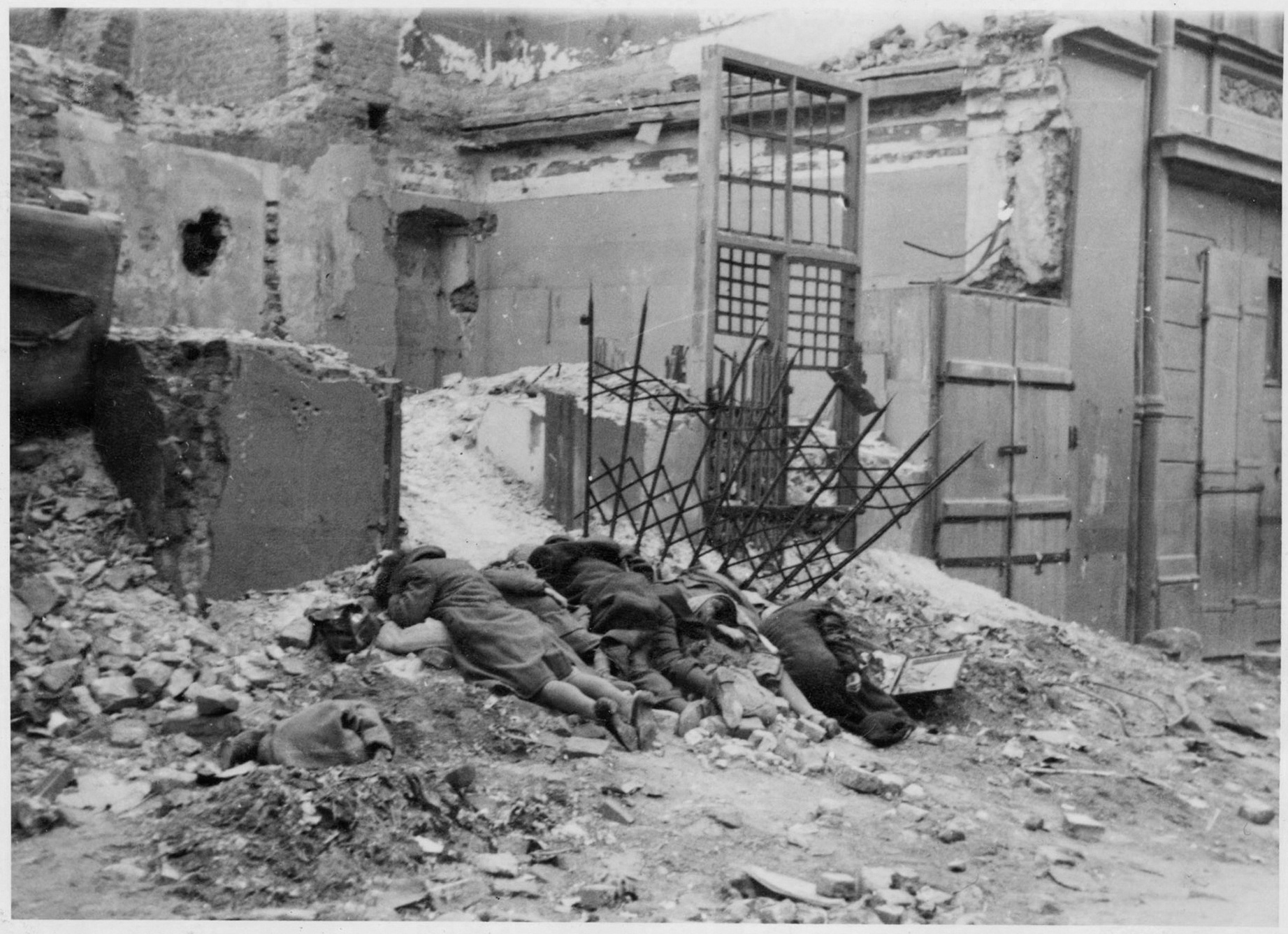
NARA copy #19, IPN copy #18
Bandits destroyed in battle
Executed Jews, possibly near Nalewki 41

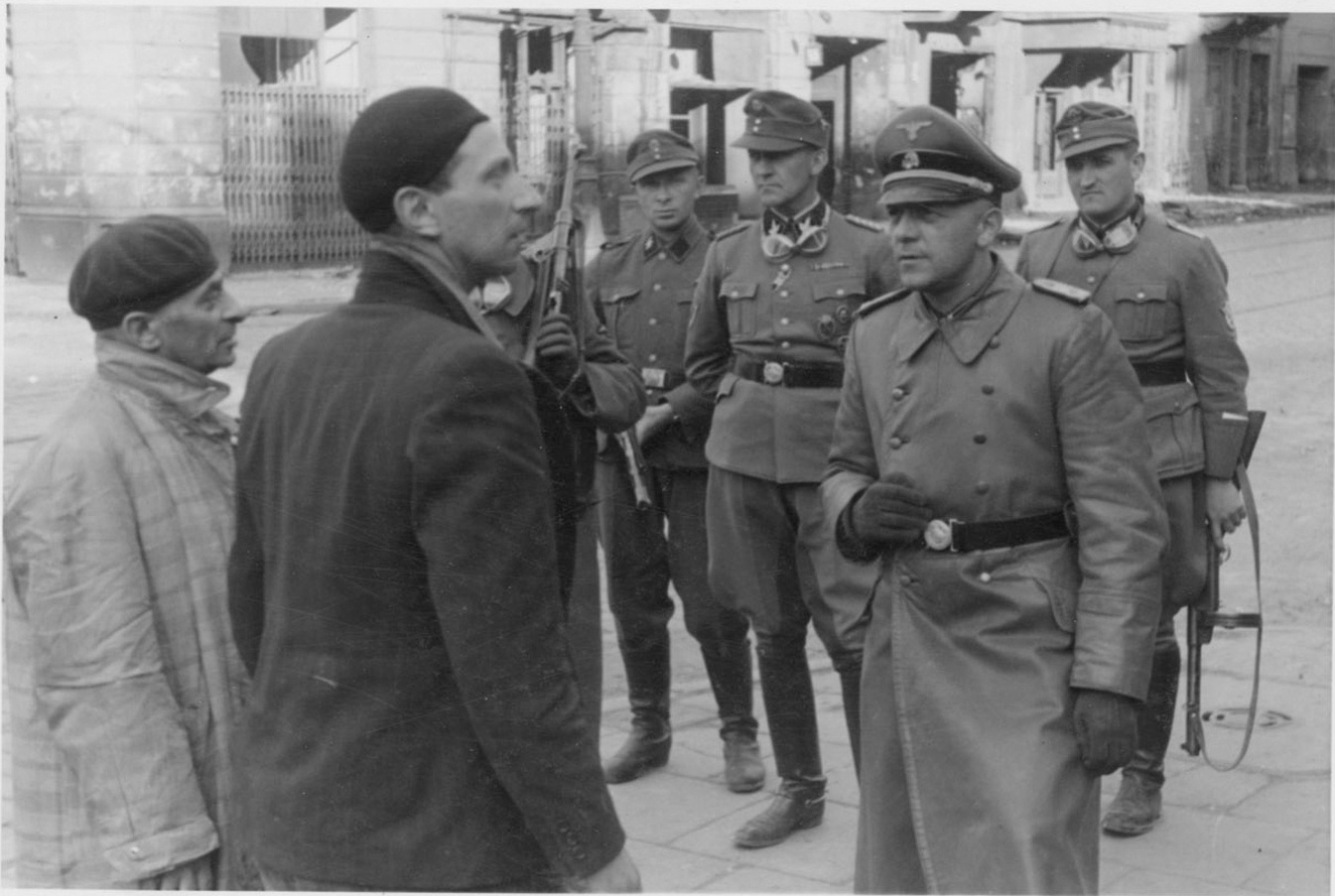
NARA copy #21, IPN copy #20
Jewish traitors
Stroop and Maximilian von Herff (likely) at Muranowski Square near Naleweki and Miła intersection with Nalewki 42 in the back. Possibly taken May 14, 1943.

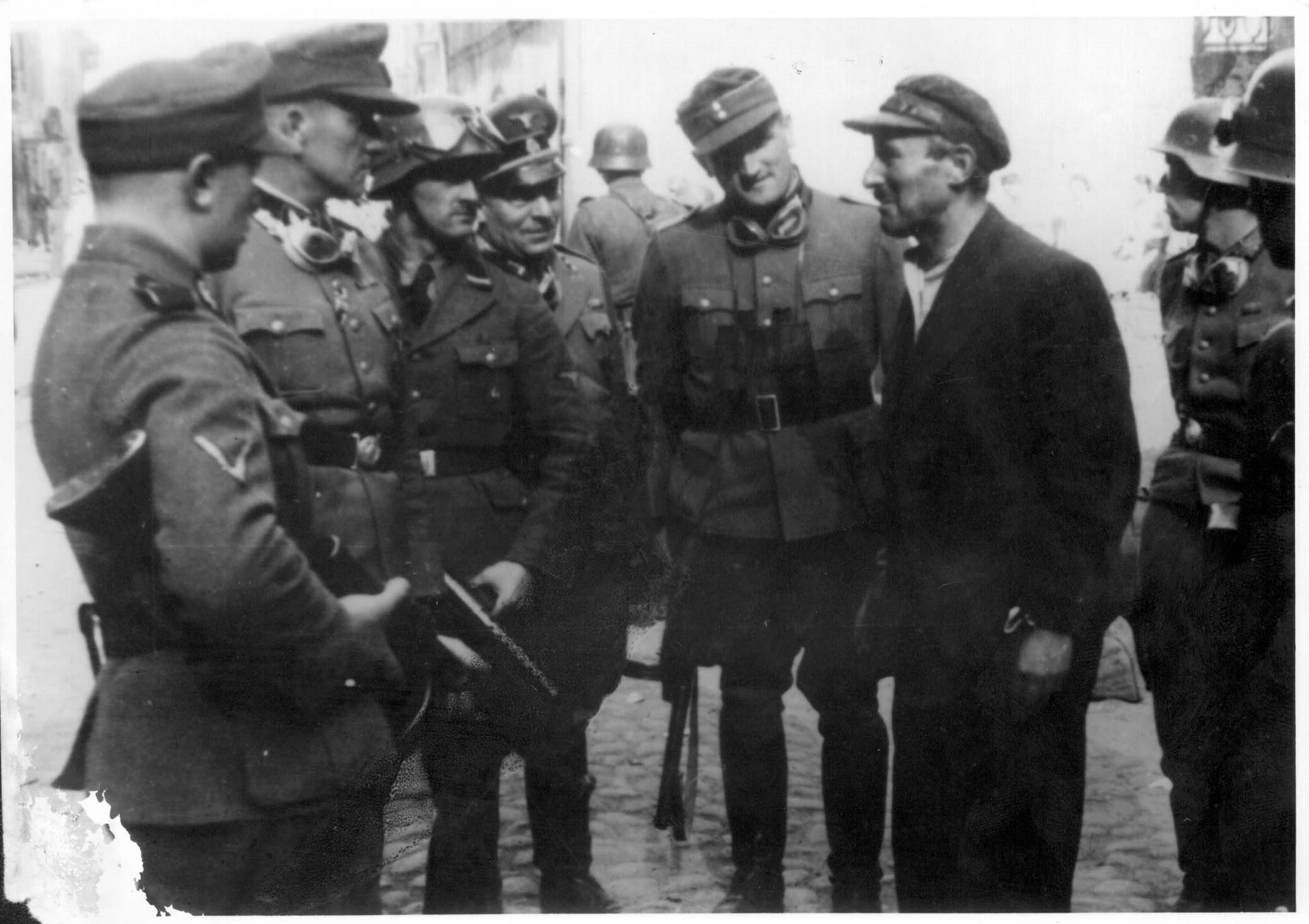
Stroop Collection Jürgen Stroop and some senior SS personnel interrogating a Jewish man during suppression of Warsaw Ghetto Uprising. The man with the goggles over his helmet (third from left) is Josef Bloshe.

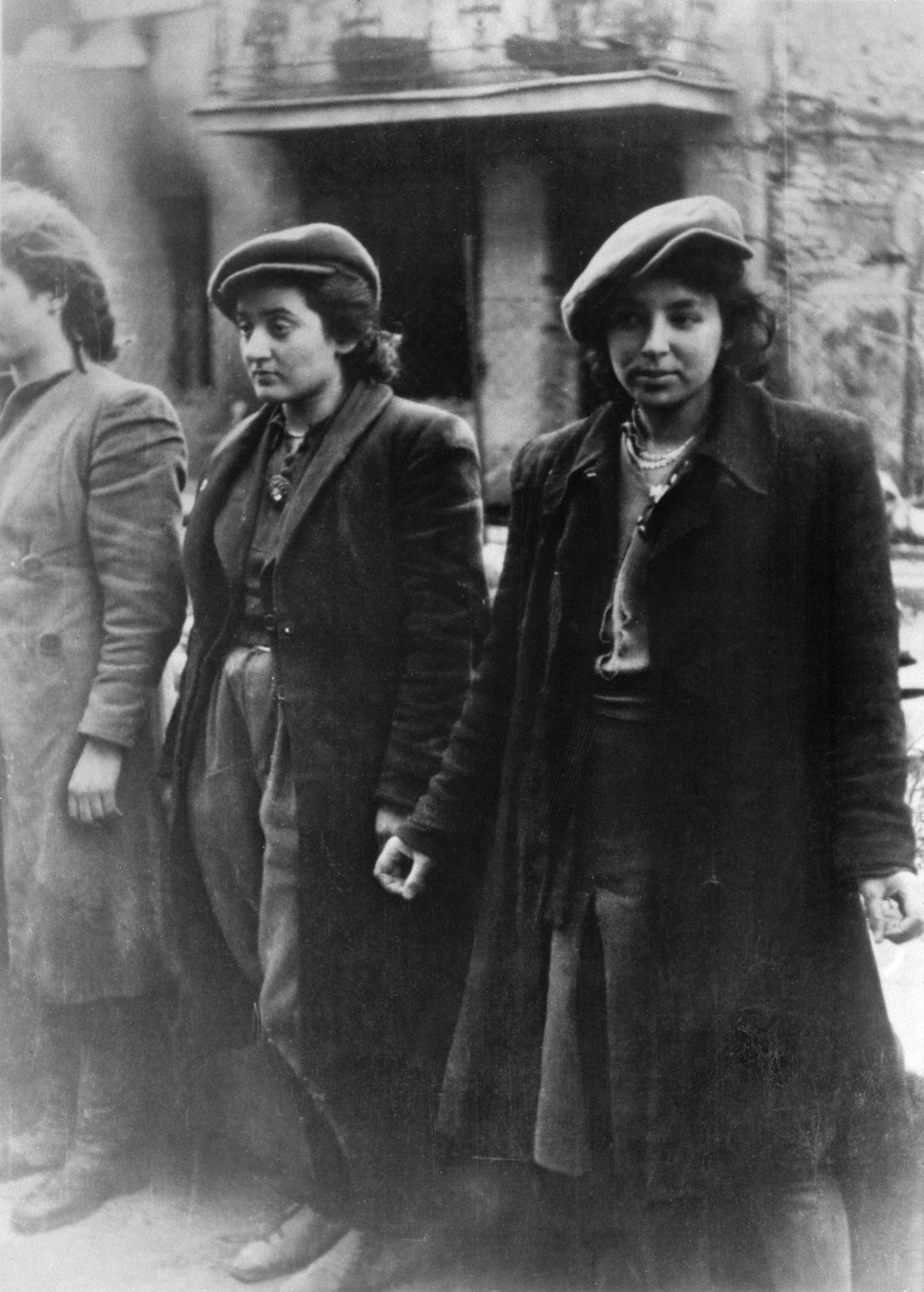
IPN copy #26
Hehalutz women captured with weapons
Małka Zdrojewicz on the right of this photograph survived Majdanek; the other two died in the Shoah (Rachela Wyszogrodzka at left died in KZ Camp; her sister Bluma Wyszogrodzka was shot and killed after this picture was taken)

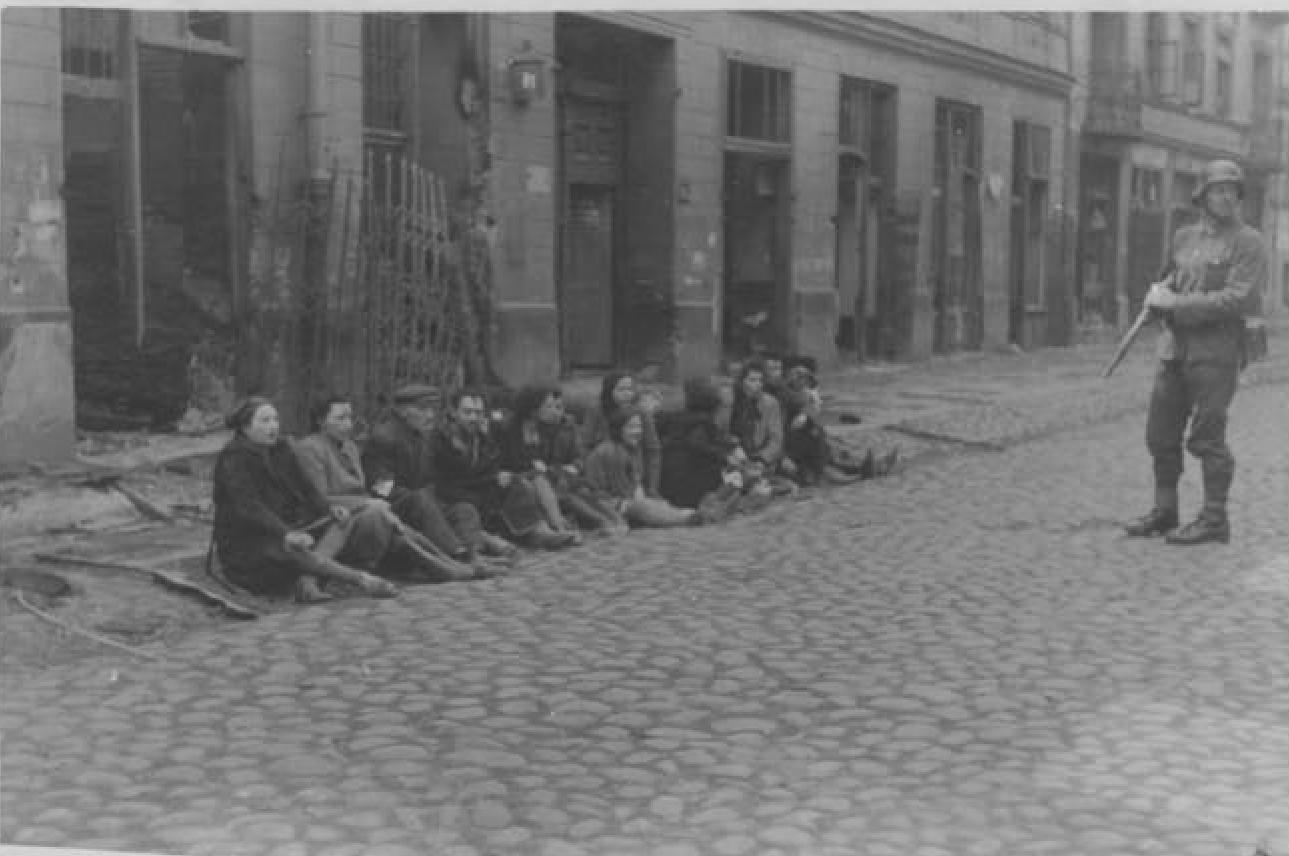
IPN copy #36
They were also found in the underground bunkers.
Captured Jews in front of Miła 31 and 33 viewed from Zamenhofa Street.

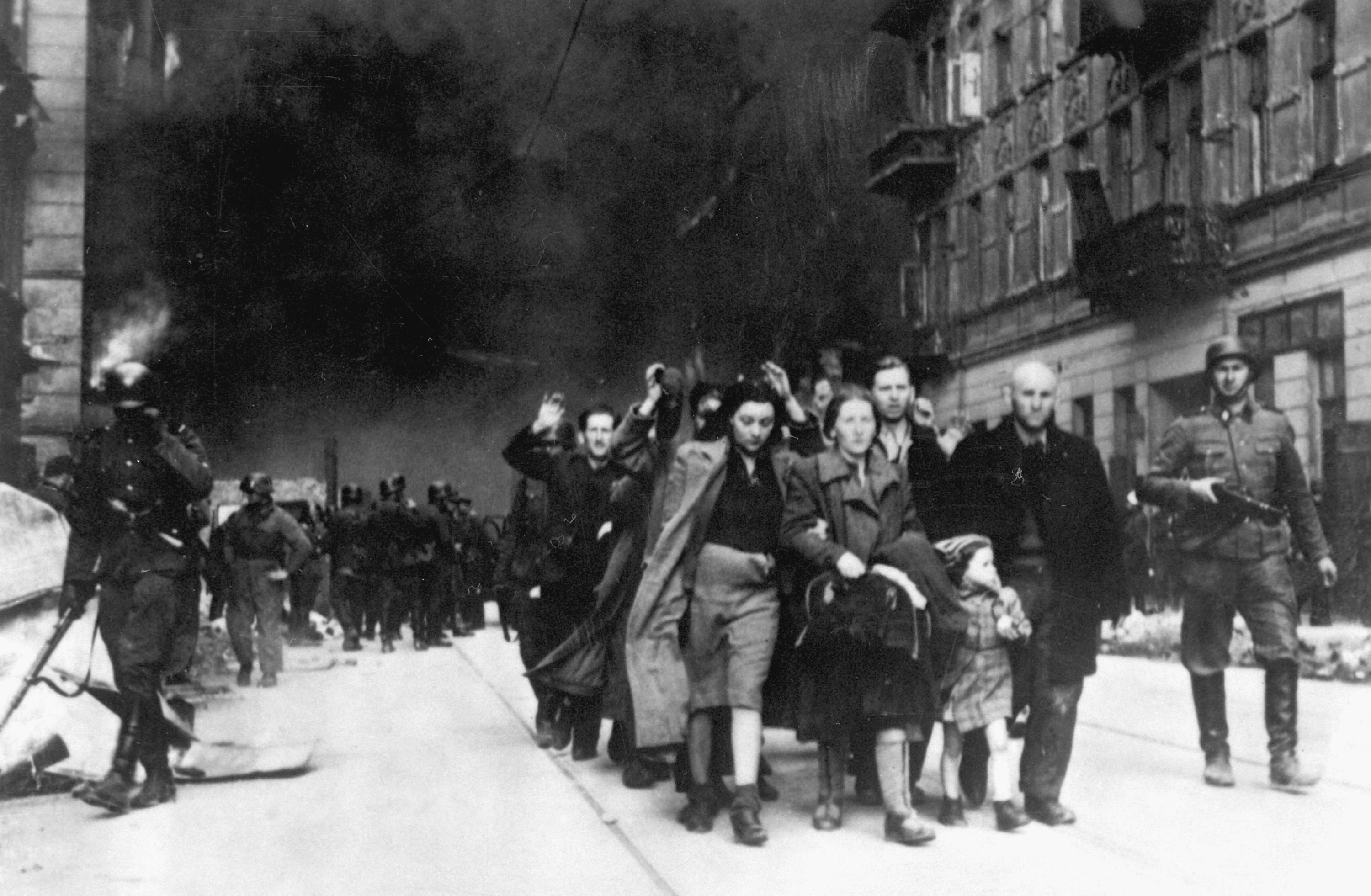
IPN copy #7
Forcibly pulled out of bunkers
Captured Jews are led by Waffen SS soldiers to Umschlagplatz. In the back Nowolipie 62 & 63. See file page for possible identity of depicted people. The SS man at right has the "Totenkopf" Insignia on his collar.

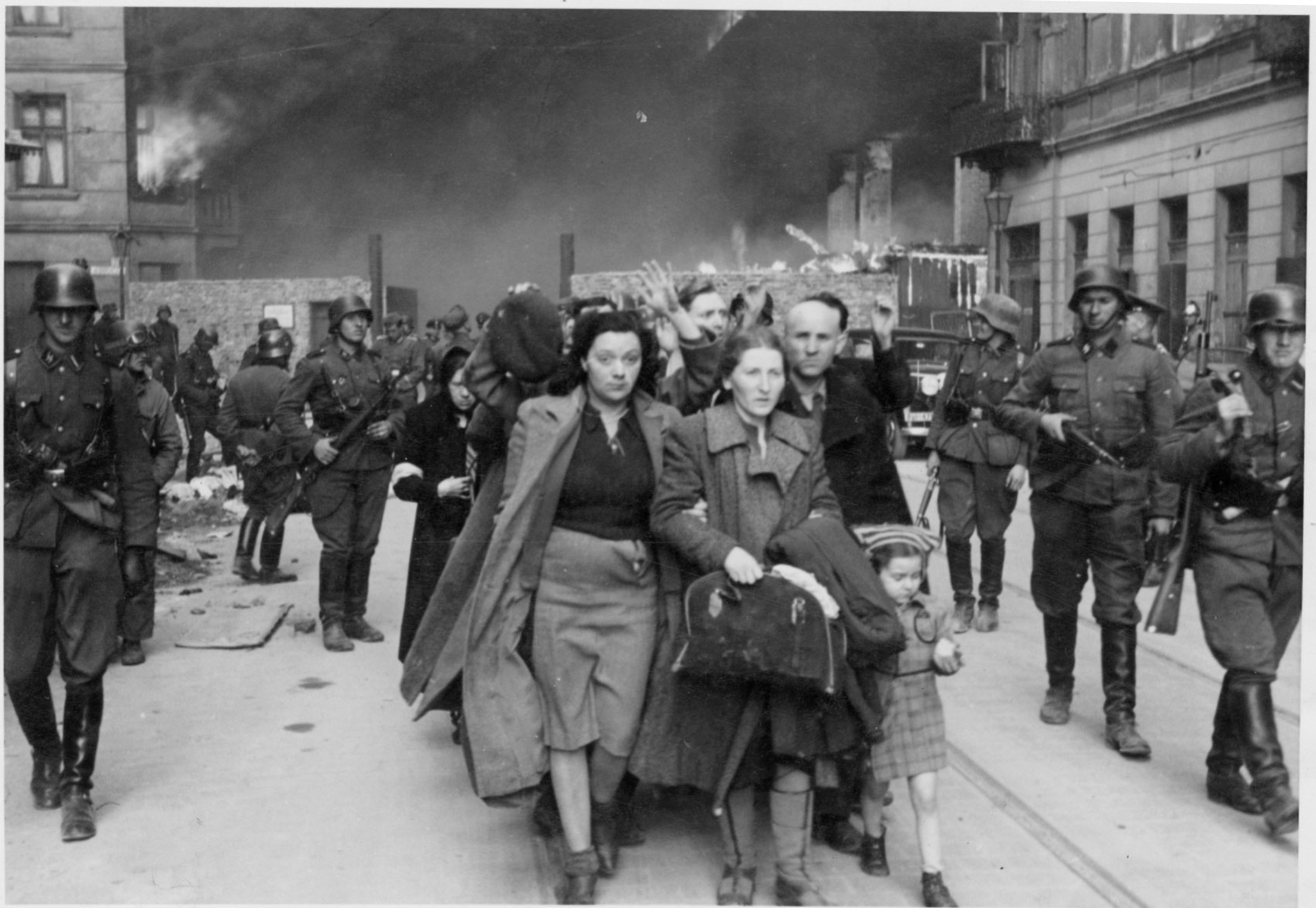
NARA copy #7
To the transhipping place
Captured Jews are led by Waffen SS soldiers to Umschlagplatz. In the back Nowolipie 62 & 63. See file page for possible identity of depicted people.

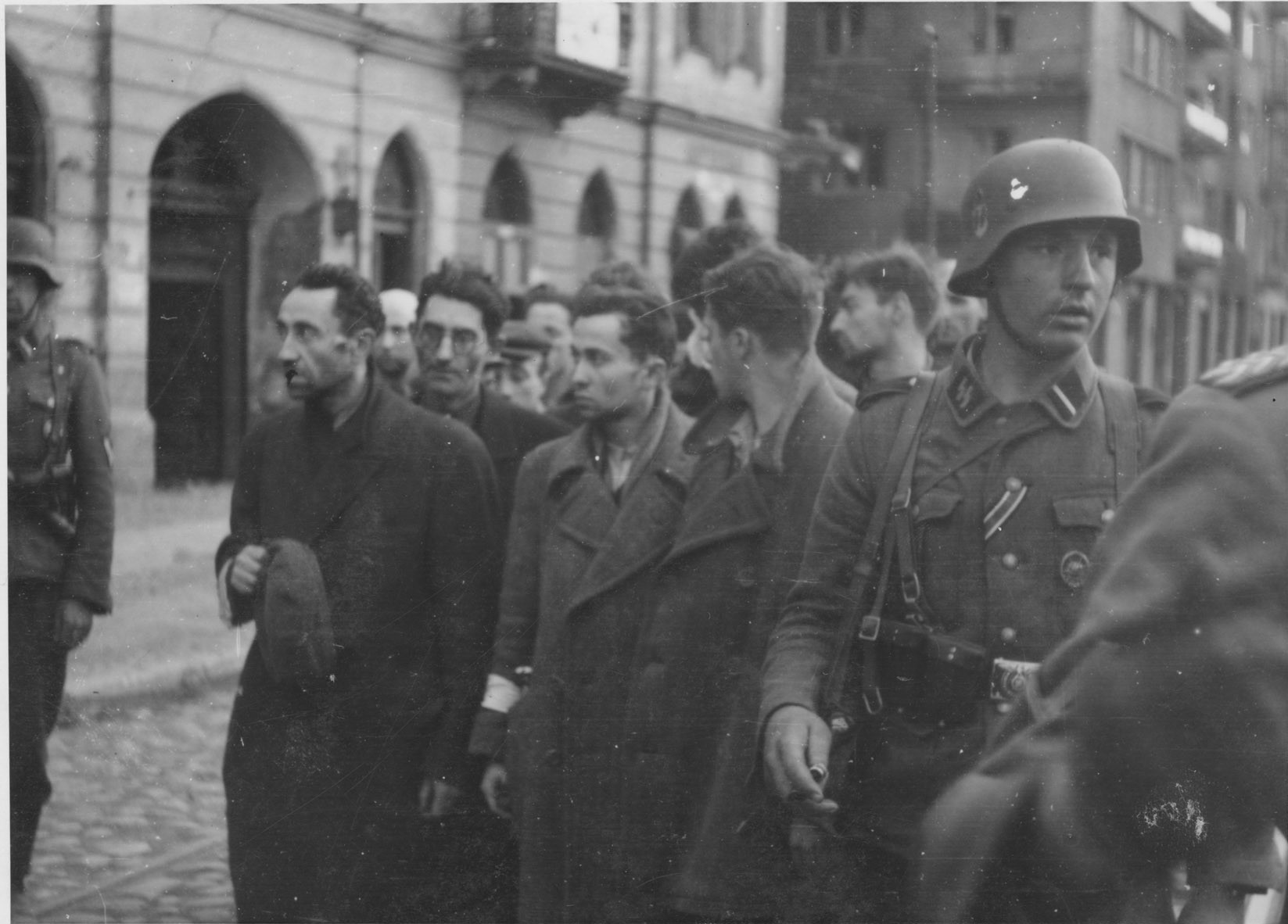
NARA copy #22
Bandits
Gęsia and Smocza intersection

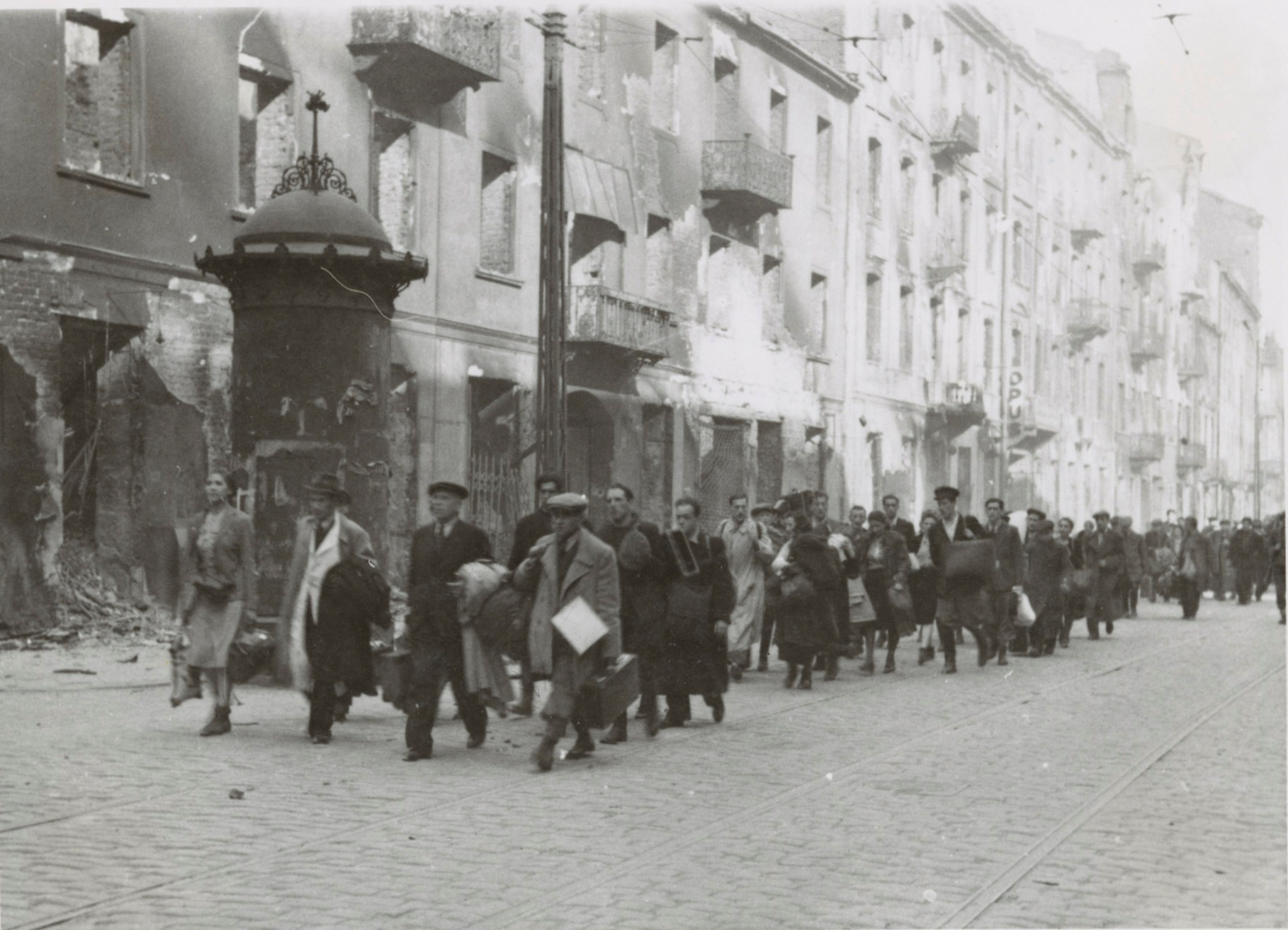
NARA copy #6, IPN copy #6
March to the rail station
Column heading North to Umschlagplatz on Zamenhofa Street near Kupiecka. In the back buildings of Zamenhofa 30-40 block.

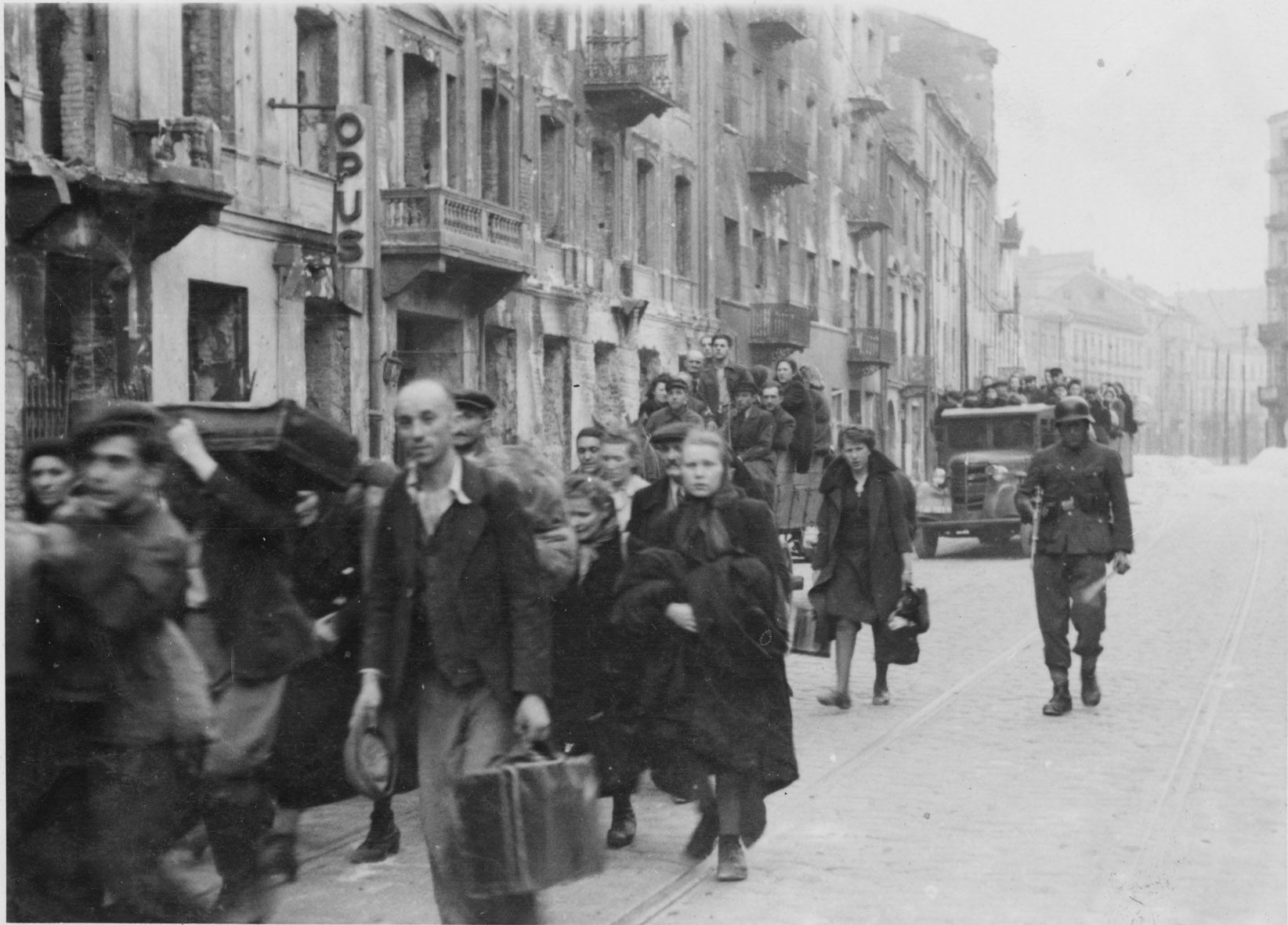
NARA copy #31
To the transhipping place
Column heading North to Umschlagplatz on Zamenhofa Street near Kupiecka. In the back buildings of Zamenhofa 30-40 block.

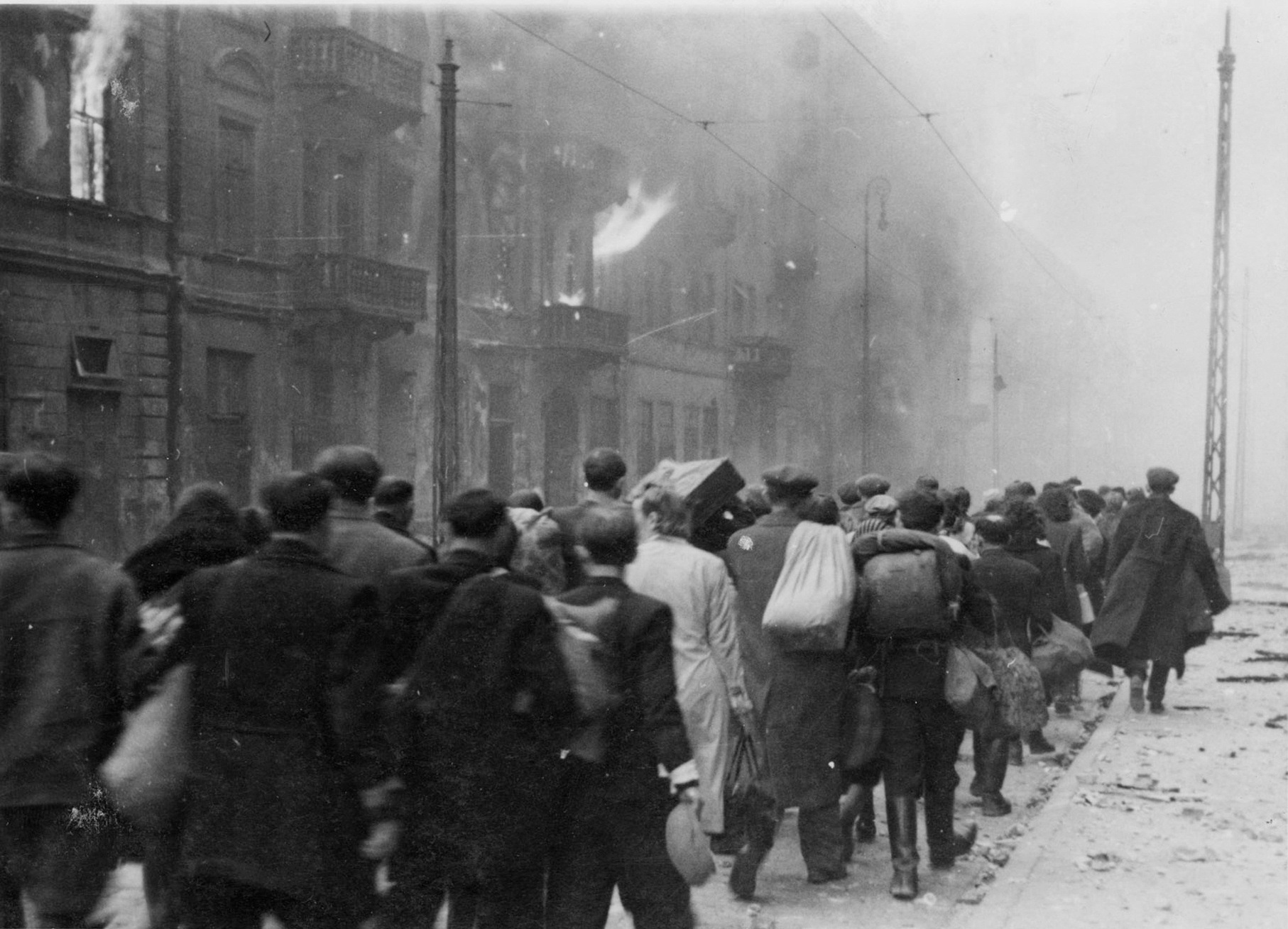
NARA copy #30, IPN copy #8
To the transhipping place
Column heading North to Umschlagplatz on Zamenhofa Street near Wołyńska. On the left 25, 27, 29.

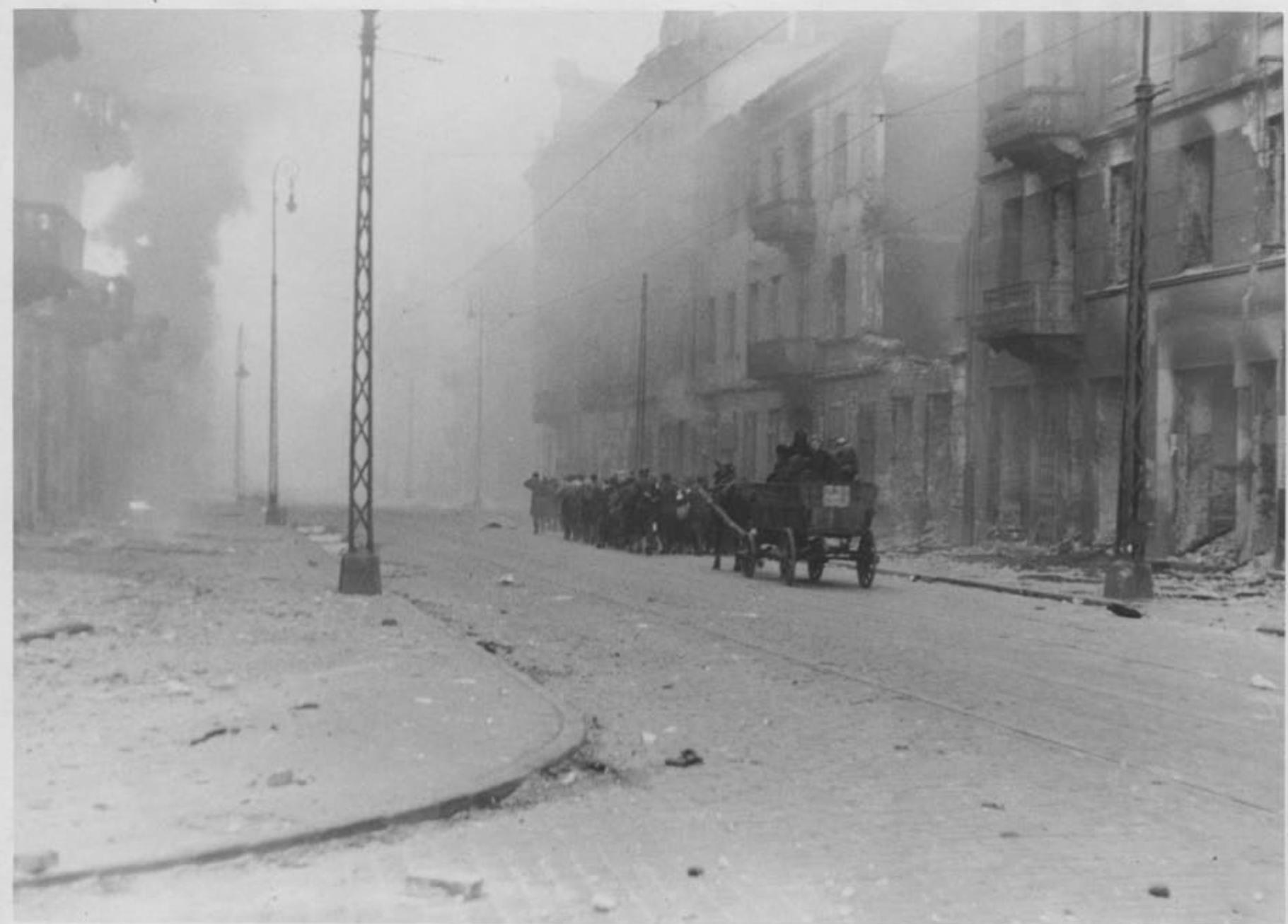
NARA copy #44, IPN copy #44
This is how the former Ghetto looks after having been destroyed.
Column heading North to Umschlagplatz on Zamenhofa Street, with burning Zamenhofa 25 / Wołyńska 2 on the left

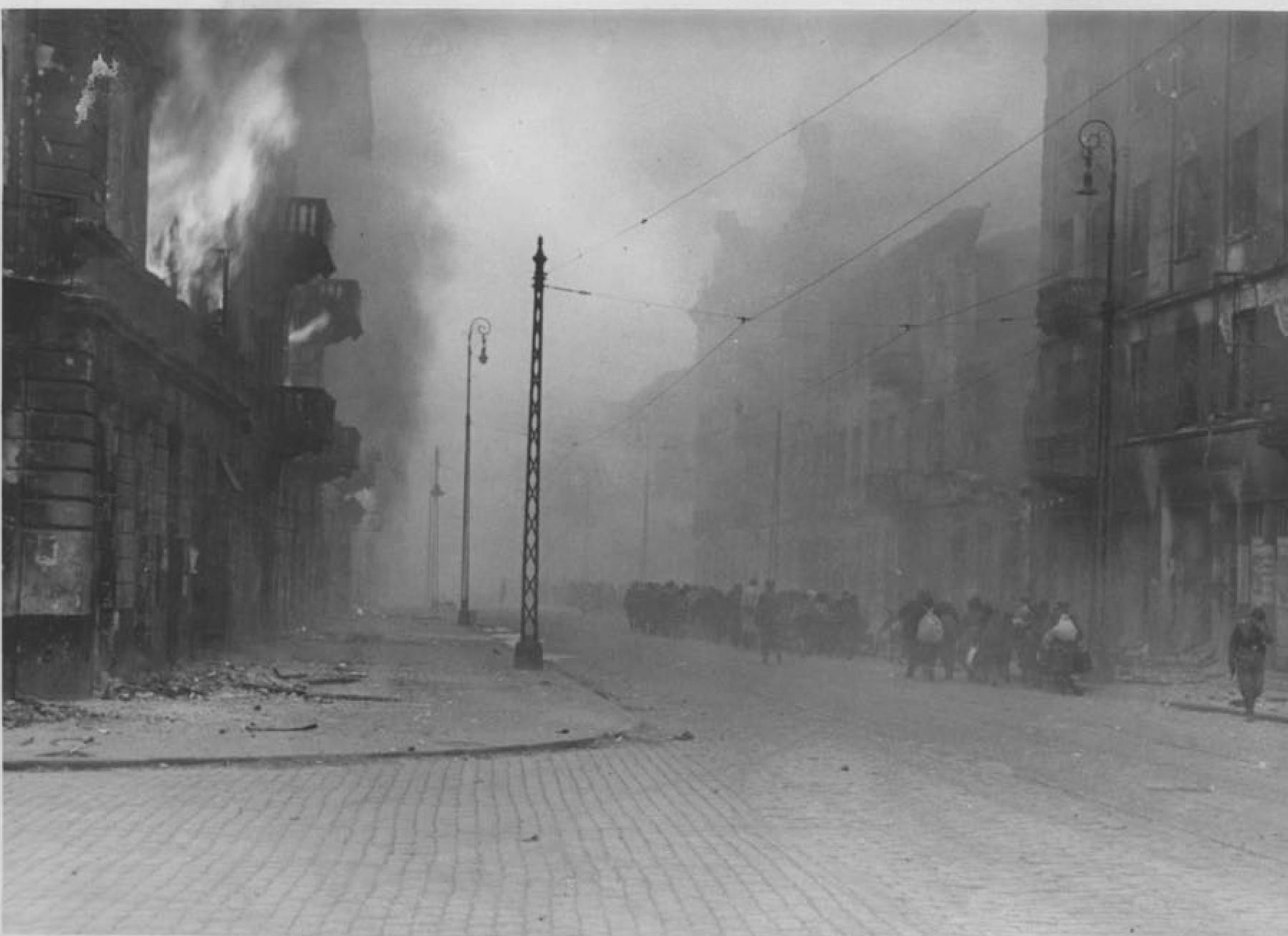
NARA copy #29, IPN copy #28
Transporting of Jews onward
Column heading North to Umschlagplatz on Zamenhofa Street, with burning Zamenhofa 25 / Wołyńska 2 on the left

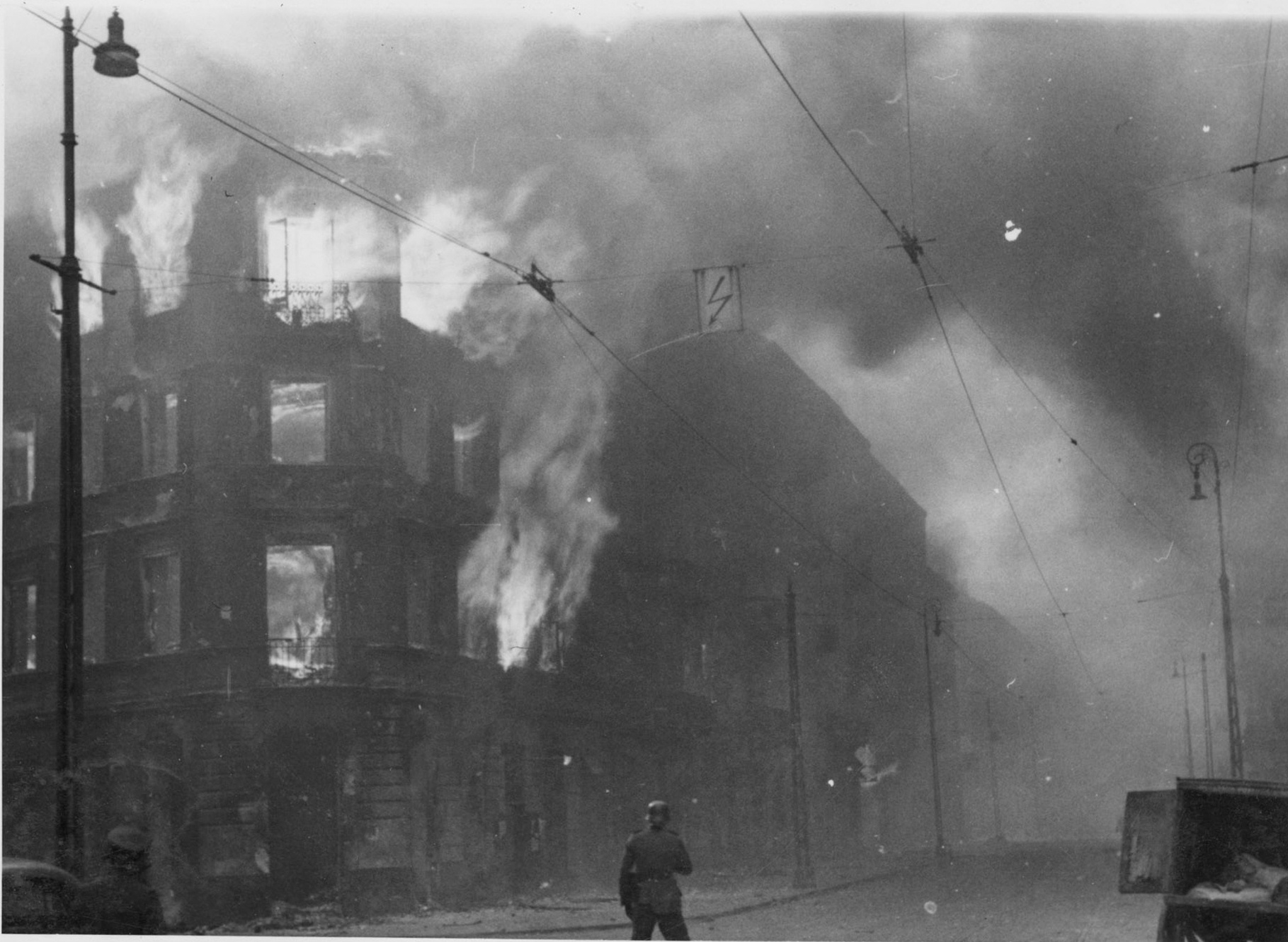
NARA copy #27, IPN copy #23
Destruction of a housing block
Zamenhofa Street looking North, with burning Zamenhofa 25 / Wołyńska 2 on the left

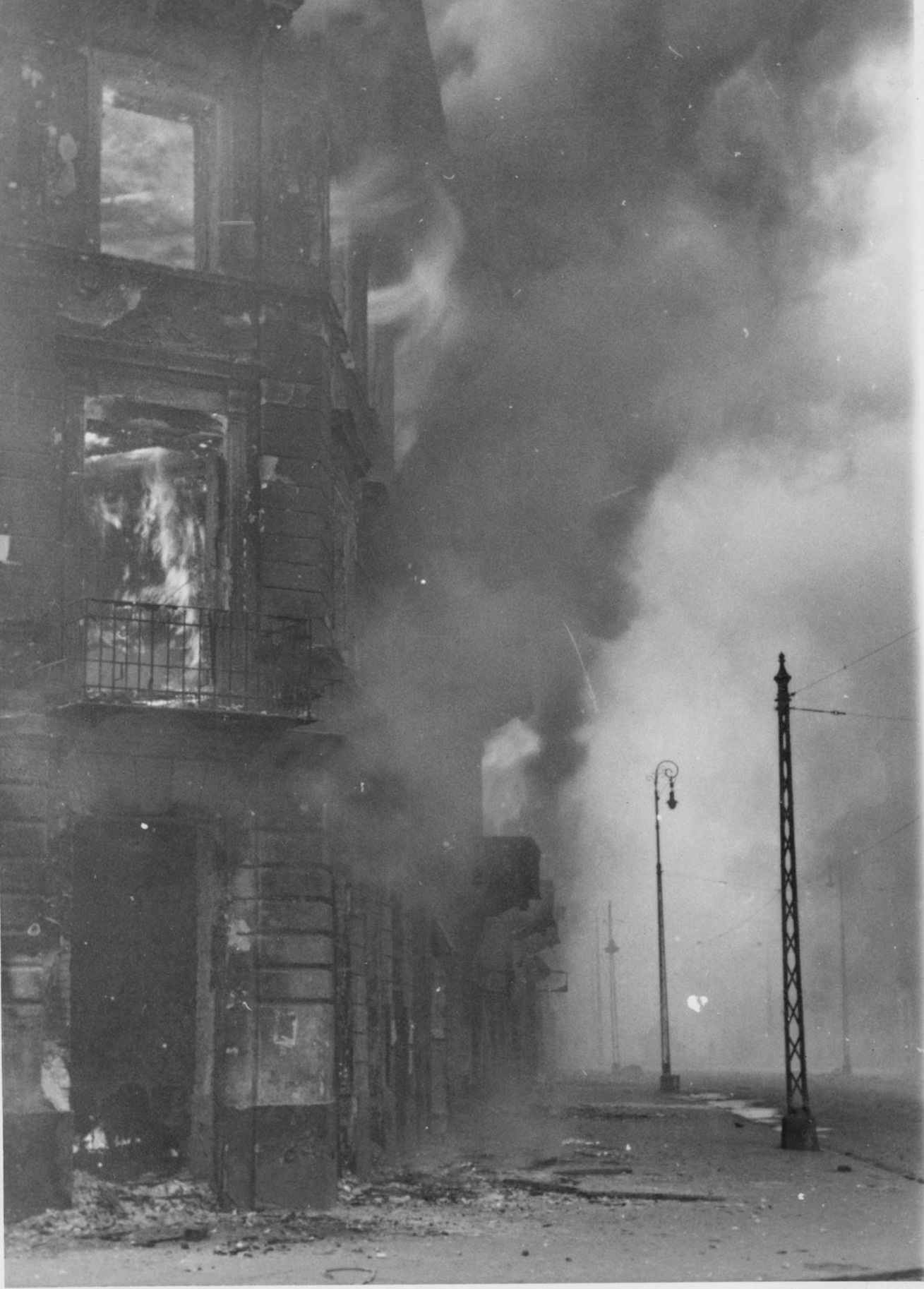
NARA copy #28
A housing block being destroyed
Zamenhofa Street looking North, with burning Zamenhofa 25 / Wołyńska 2 on the left

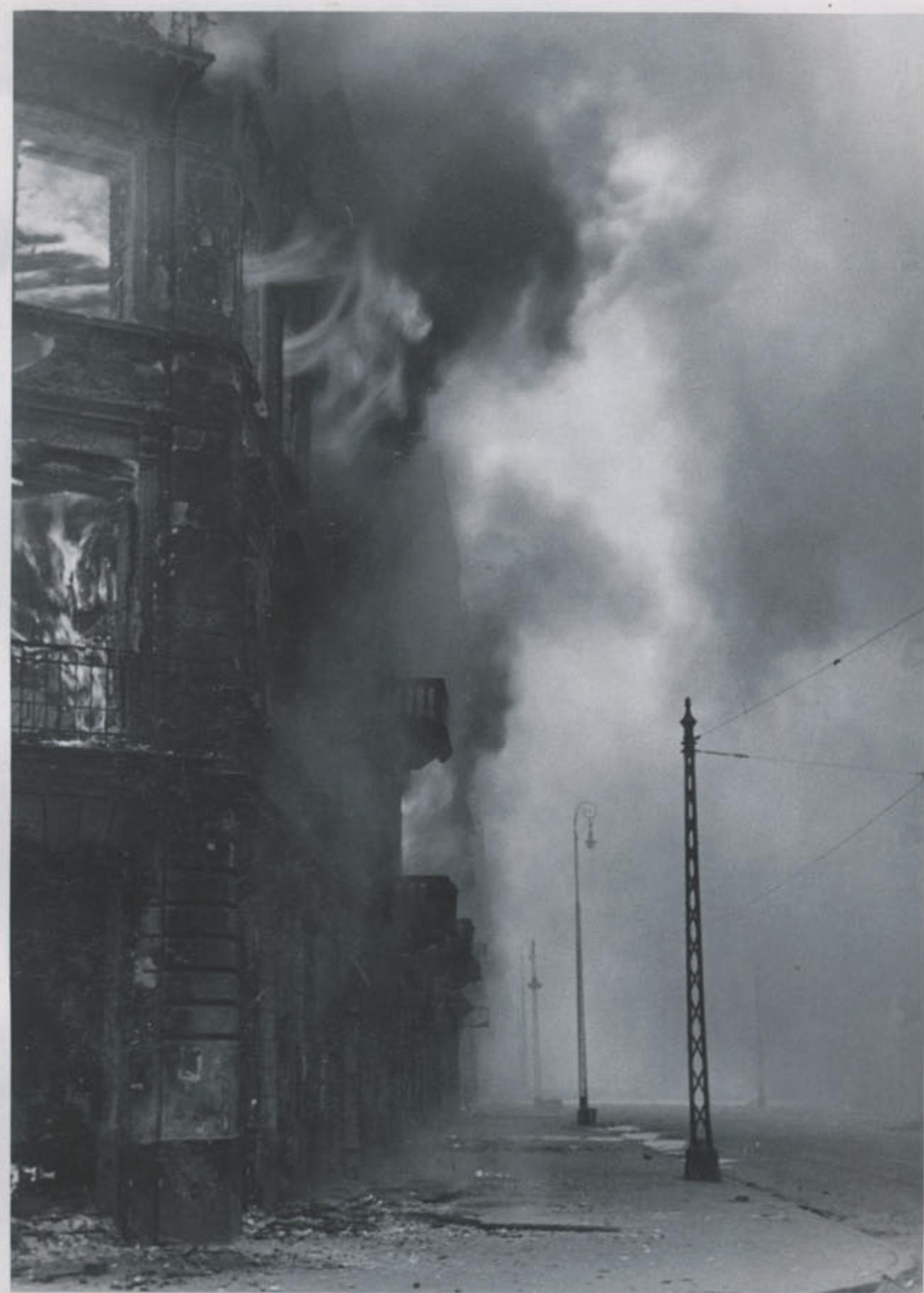
IPN copy #27
A housing block being destroyed
Zamenhofa Street looking North, with burning Zamenhofa 25 / Wołyńska 2 on the left

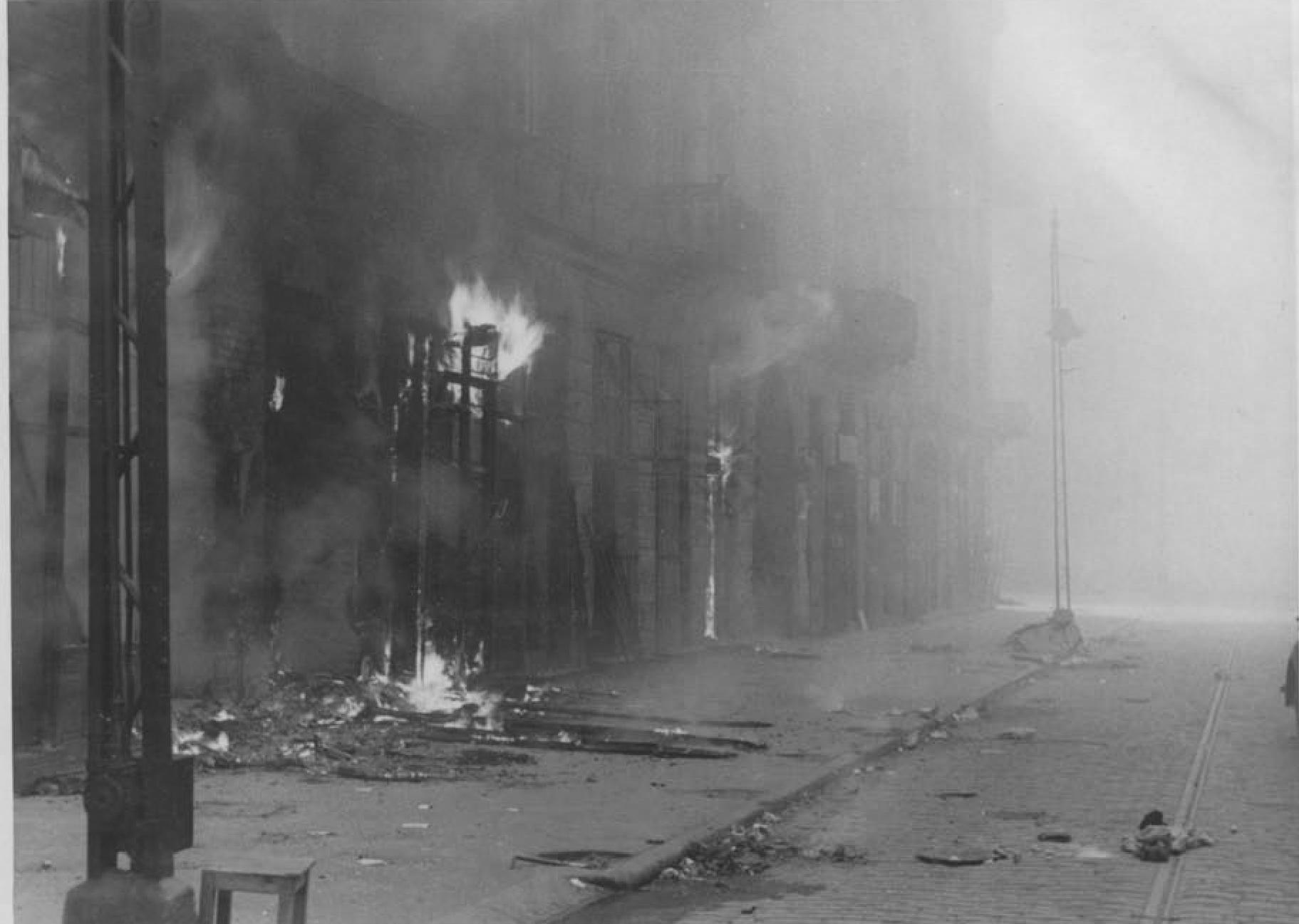
IPN copy #48
(No image caption, in section This is how the former Ghetto looks after having been destroyed)
Zamenhofa Street between Wołyńska and Miła looking North, with burning Zamenhofa 29, 31 and 33 on the left

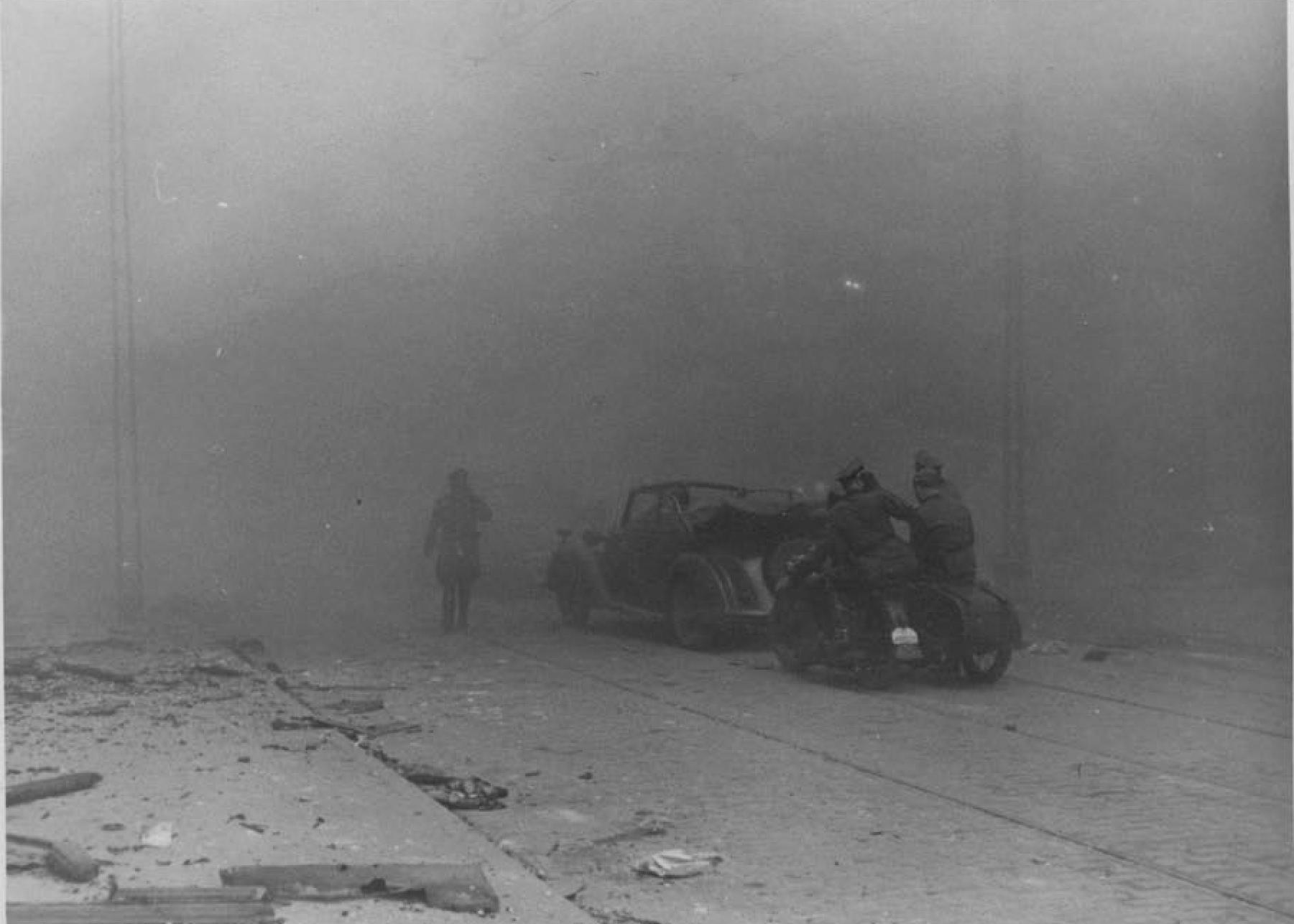
IPN copy #24
(No caption)
Zamenhofa Street between Wołyńska and Miła looking North, with burning Zamenhofa 29, 31 and 33 on the left

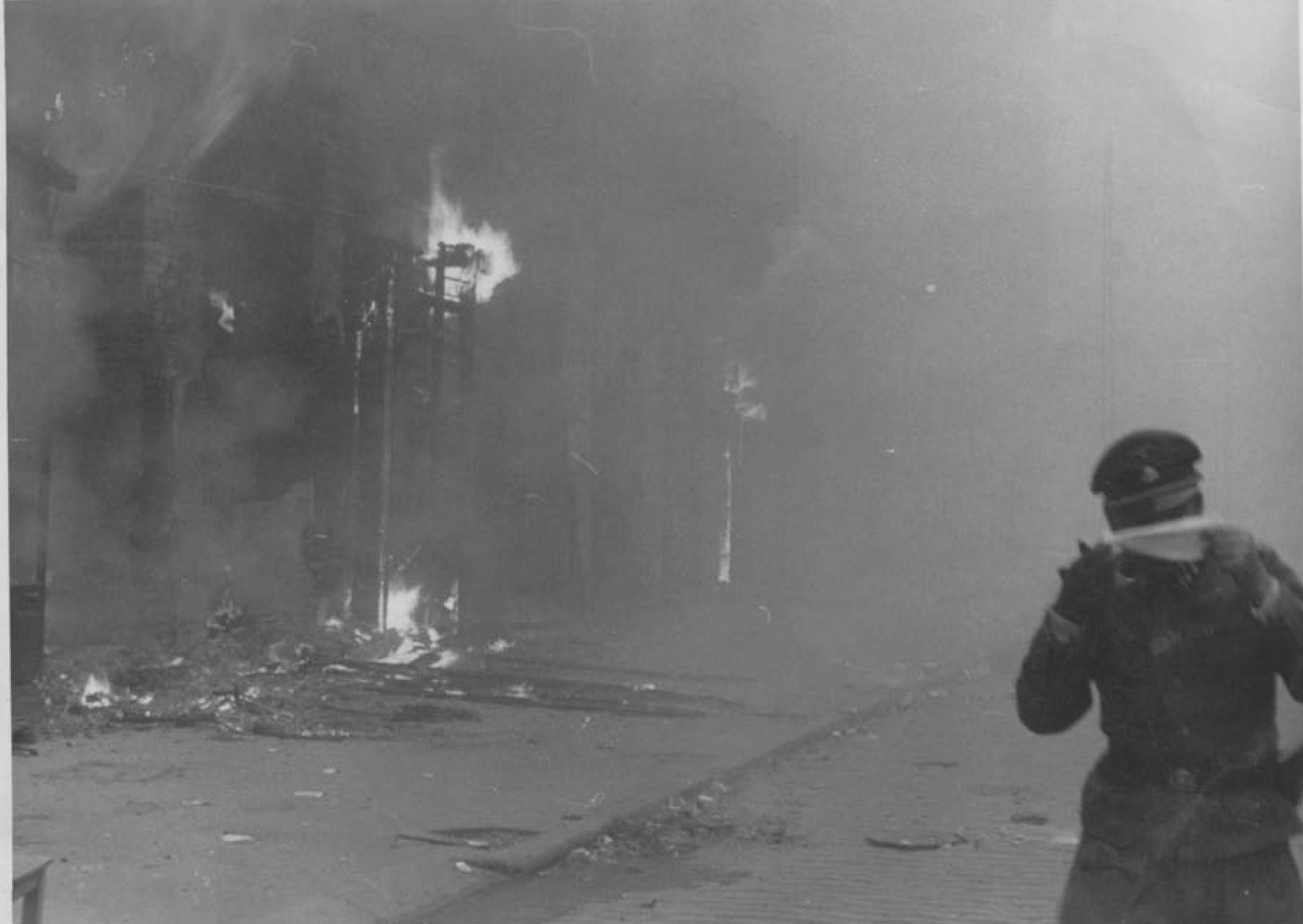
IPN copy #25
(No caption)
Zamenhofa Street between Wołyńska and Miła looking North

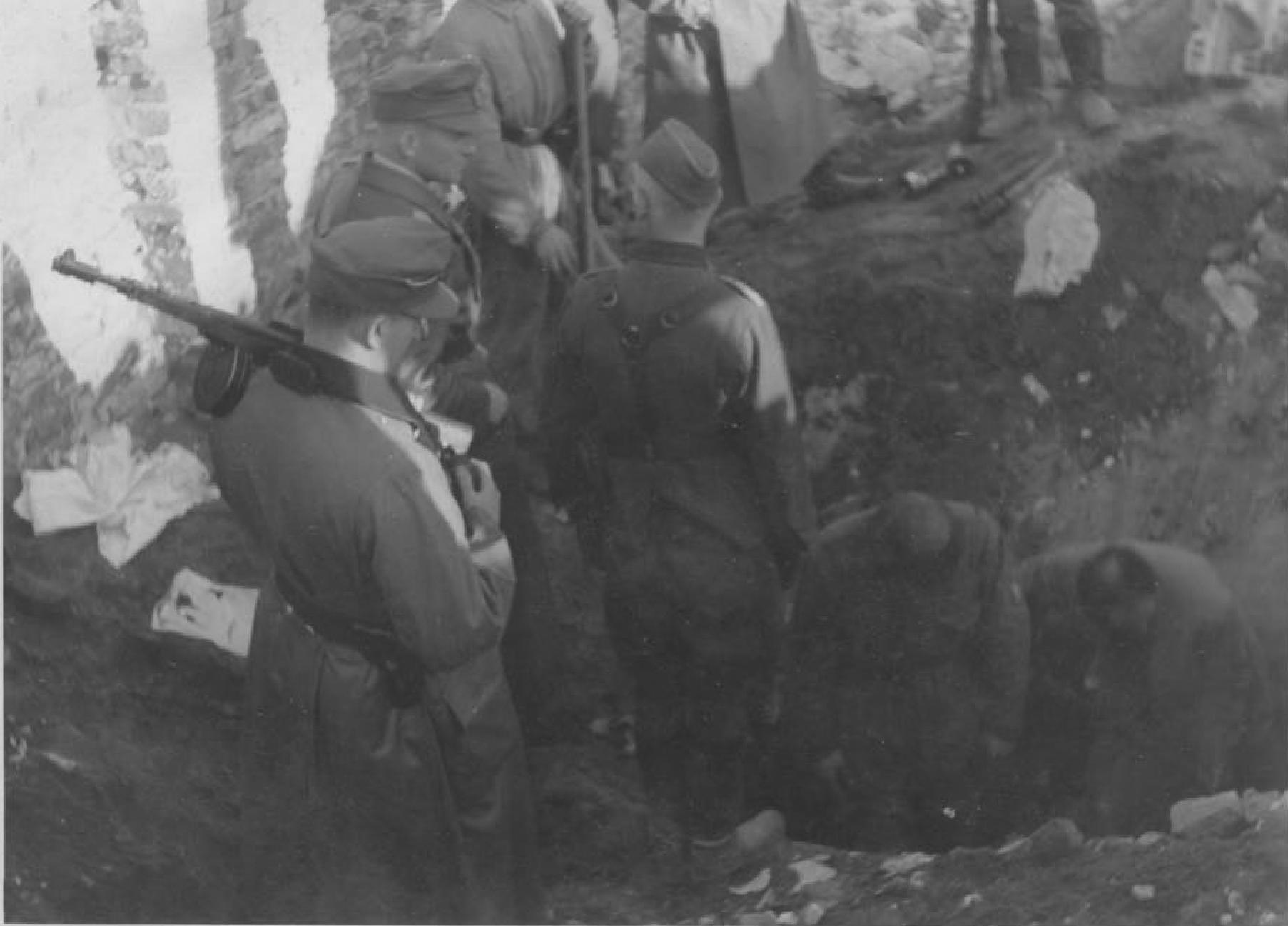
NARA copy #20, IPN copy #19
A bunker being opened
Stroop witnesses digging out of a bunker, possibly near the ghetto wall. 8 May 1943

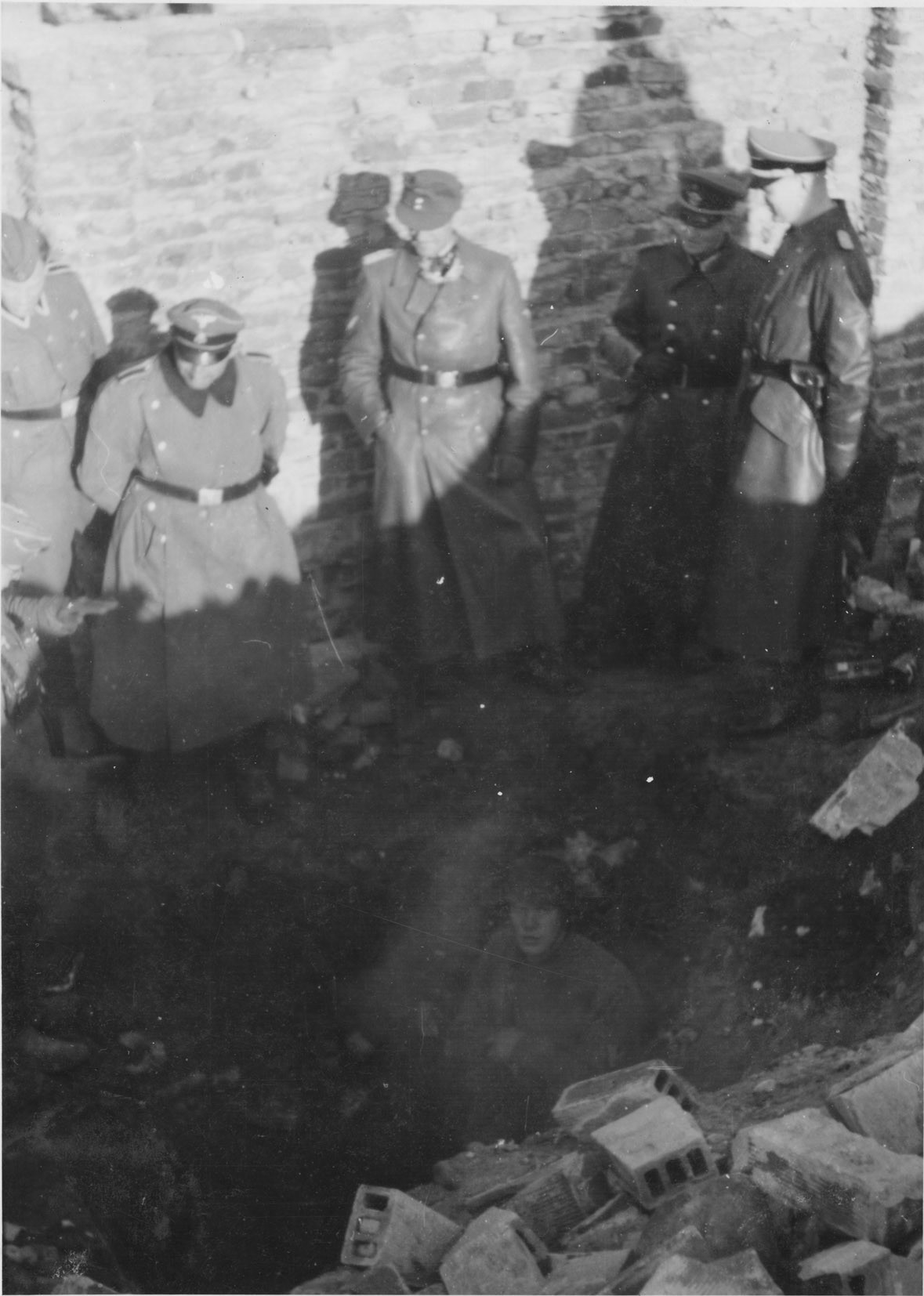
NARA copy #38
They were also found in the underground bunkers
Stroop witnesses digging out of a bunker, possibly near the ghetto wall. 8 May 1943

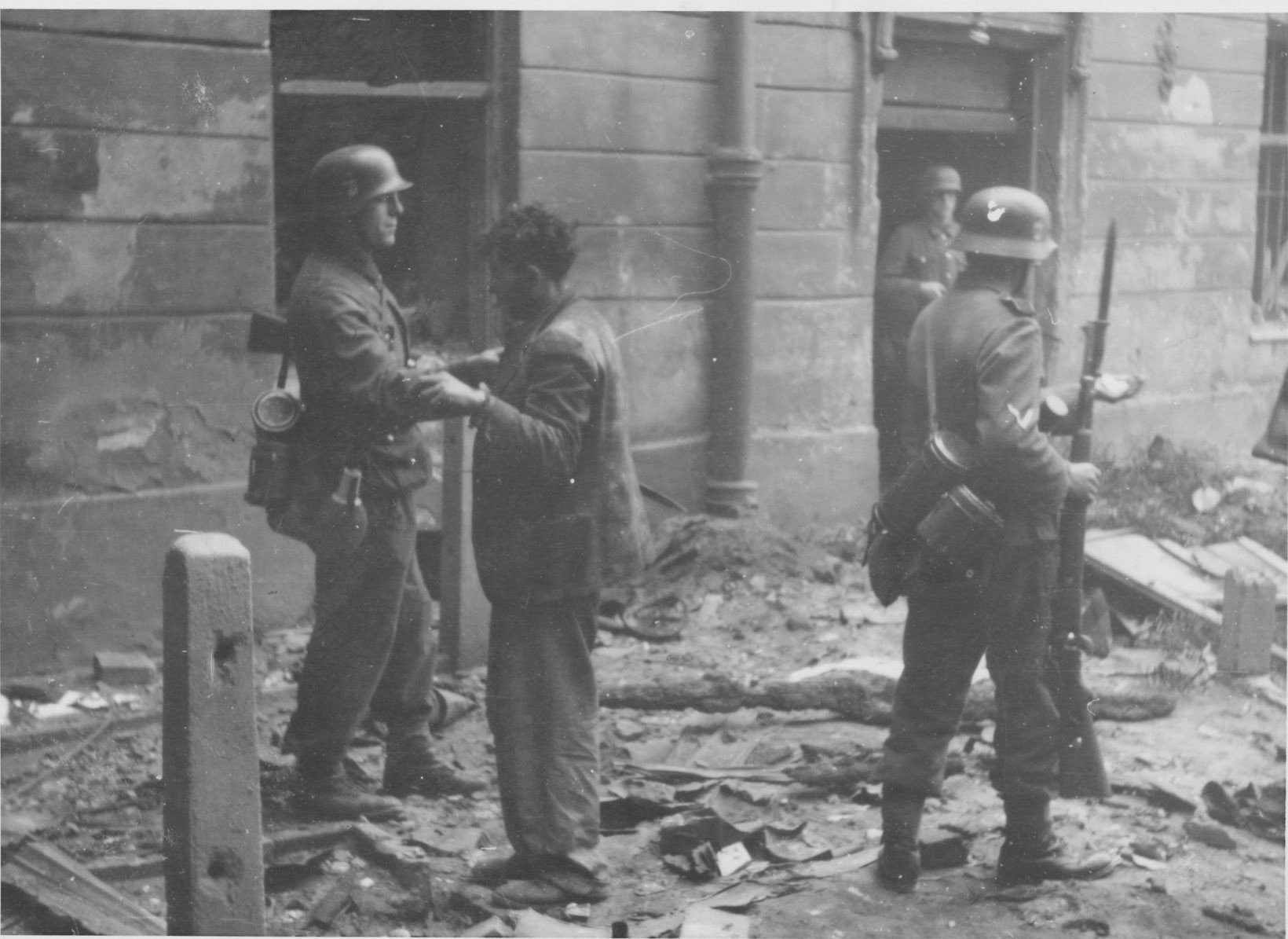
NARA copy #14
Jews pulled from a bunker
Reportedly from Nowolipie / Smocza intersection

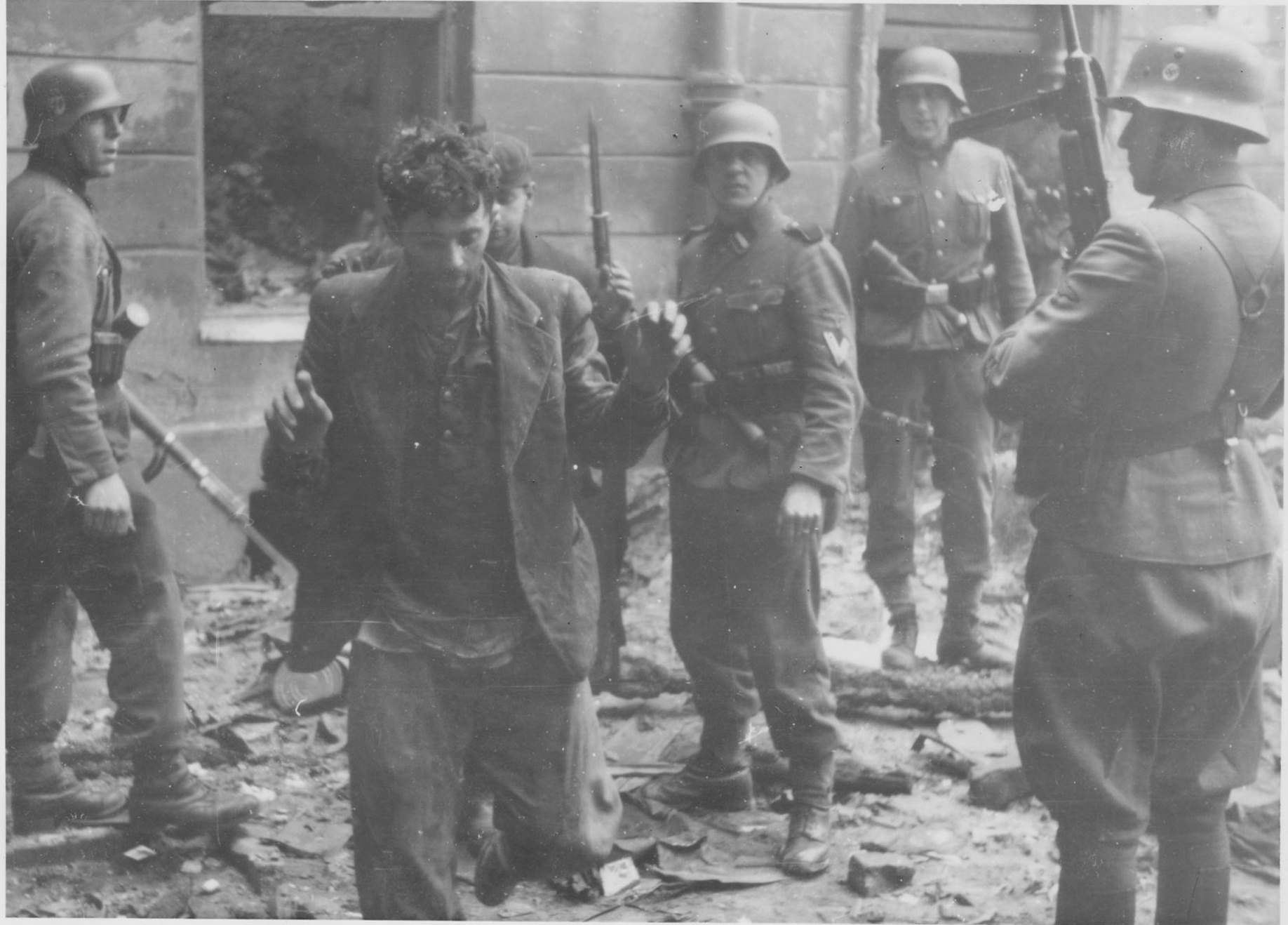
NARA copy #15, IPN copy #17
Bandits
Reportedly from Nowolipie / Smocza intersection

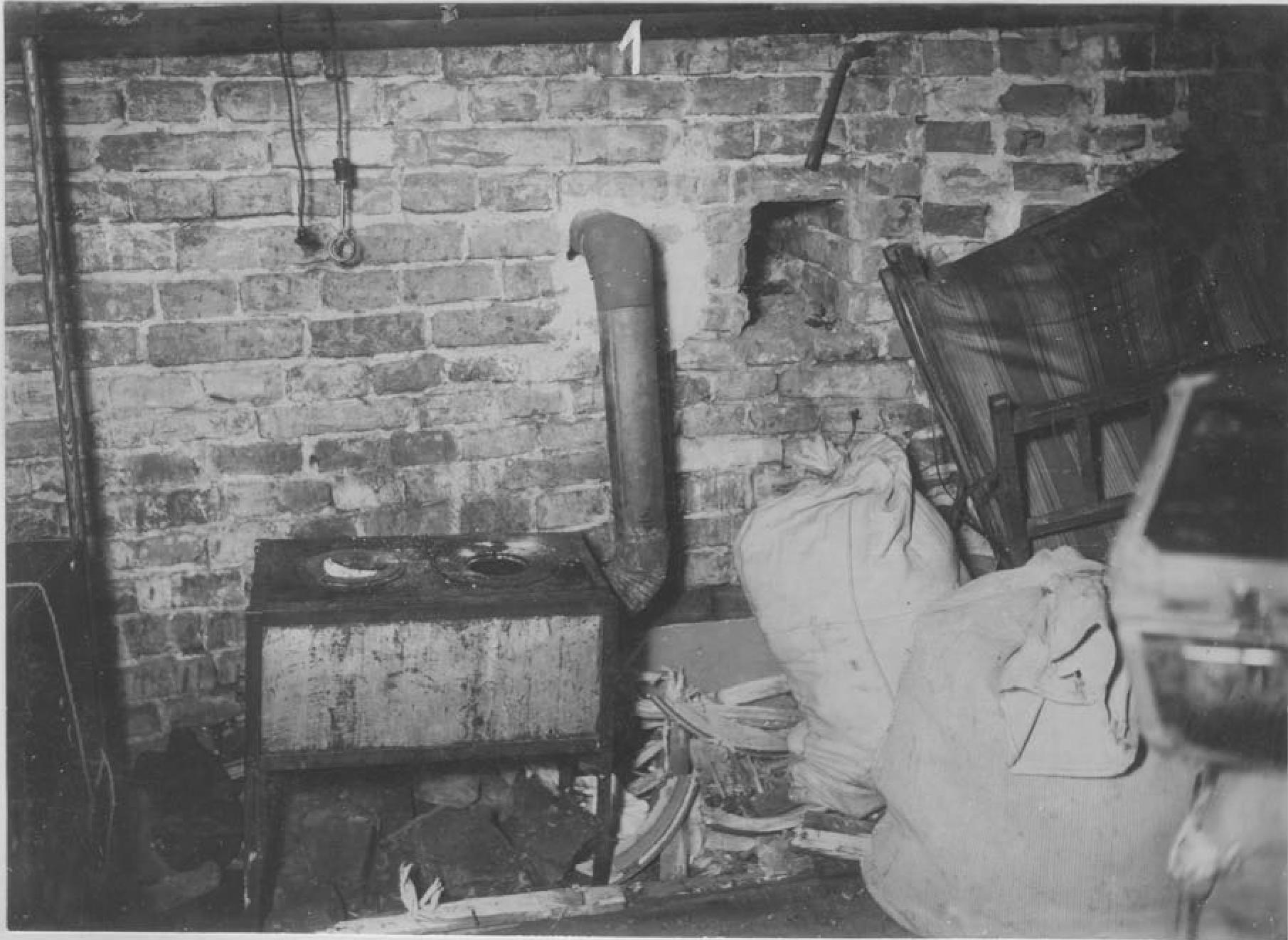
NARA copy #35, IPN copy #29
Photos showing parts of so called dwelling dugouts

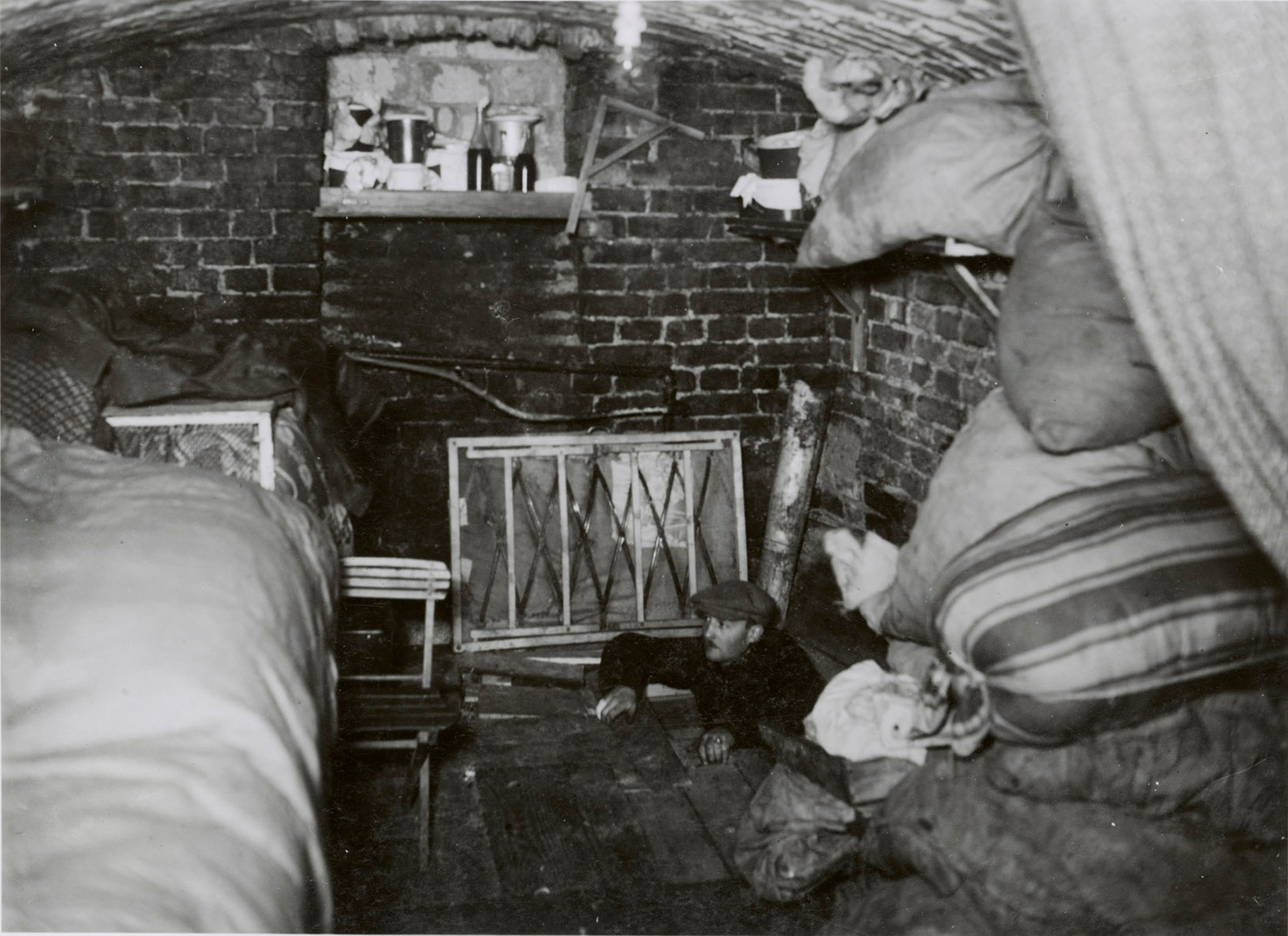
NARA copy #34, IPN copy #30
Photos showing parts of so called dwelling dugouts

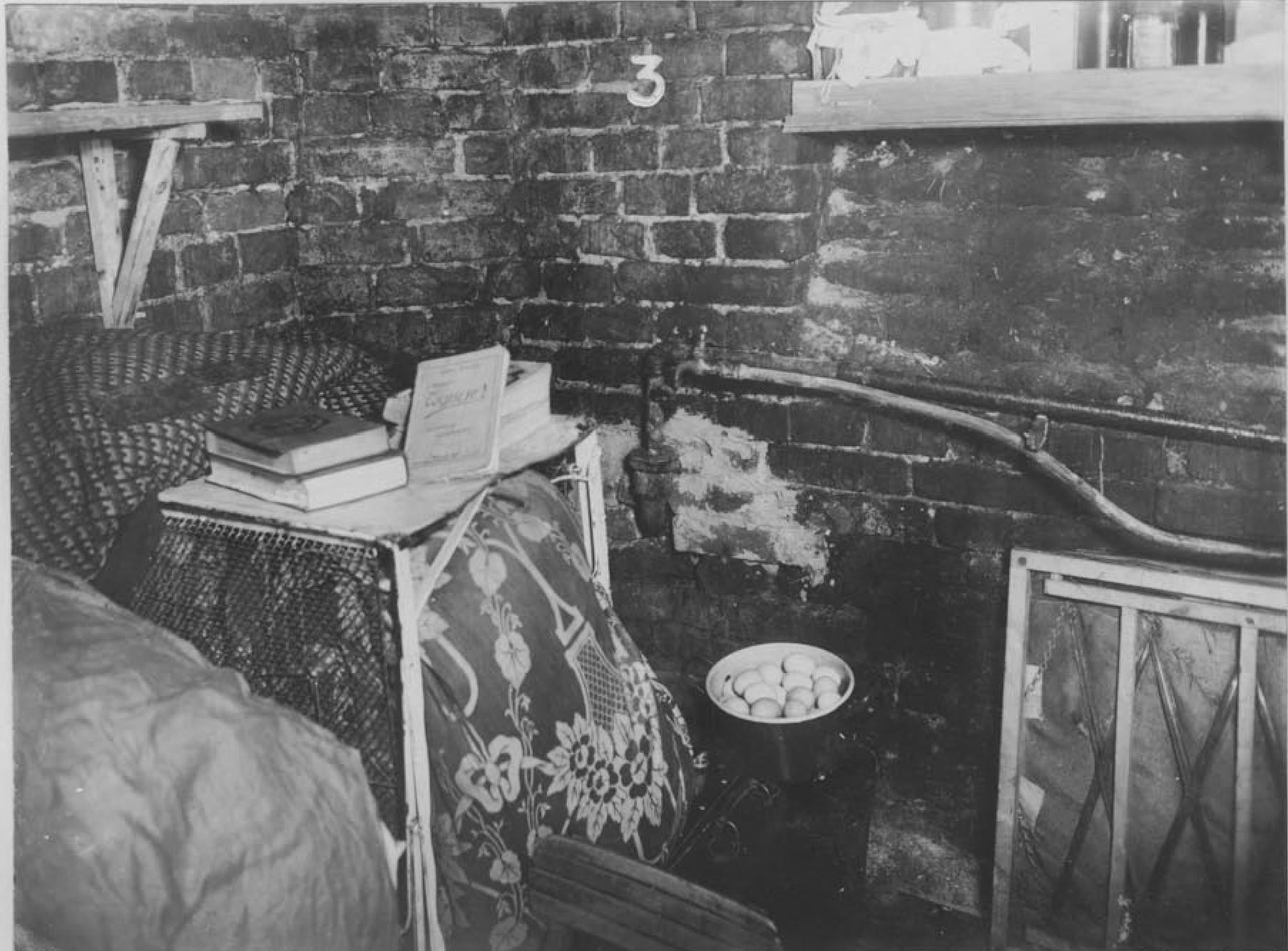
NARA copy #33, IPN copy #31
Photos showing parts of so called dwelling dugouts

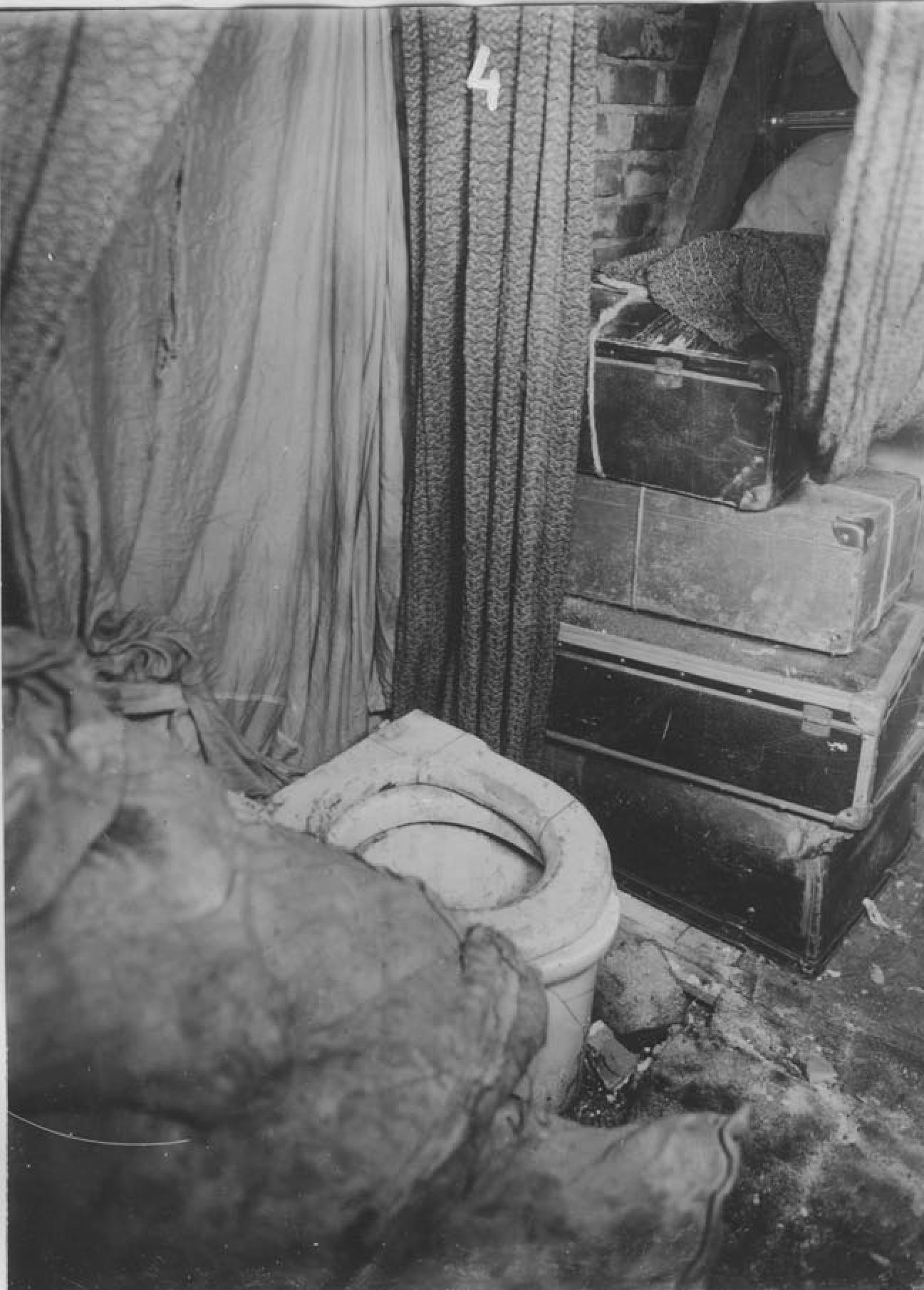
NARA copy #36, IPN copy #32
Photos showing parts of so called dwelling dugouts

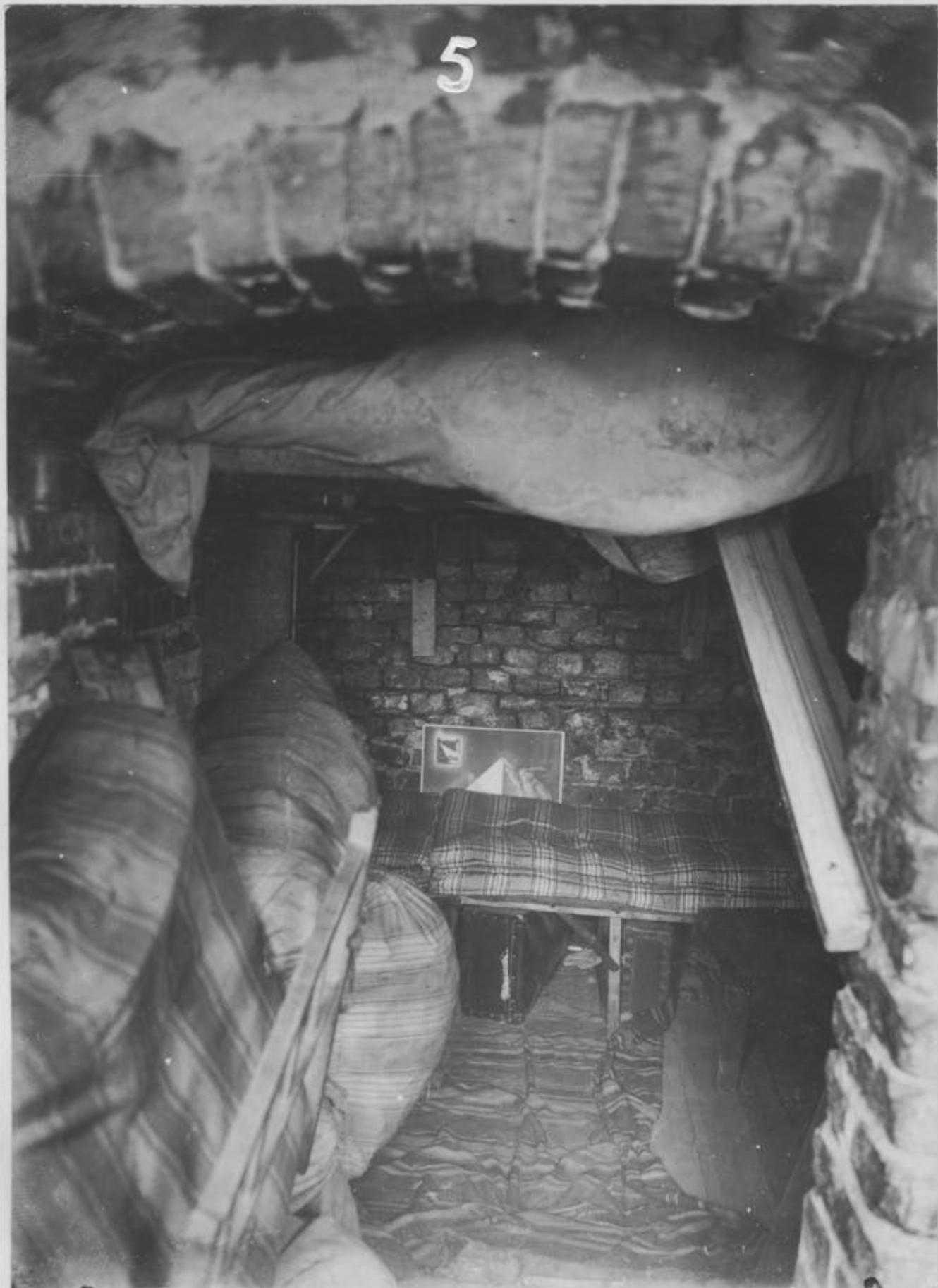
NARA copy #32, IPN copy #33
Photos showing parts of so called dwelling dugouts

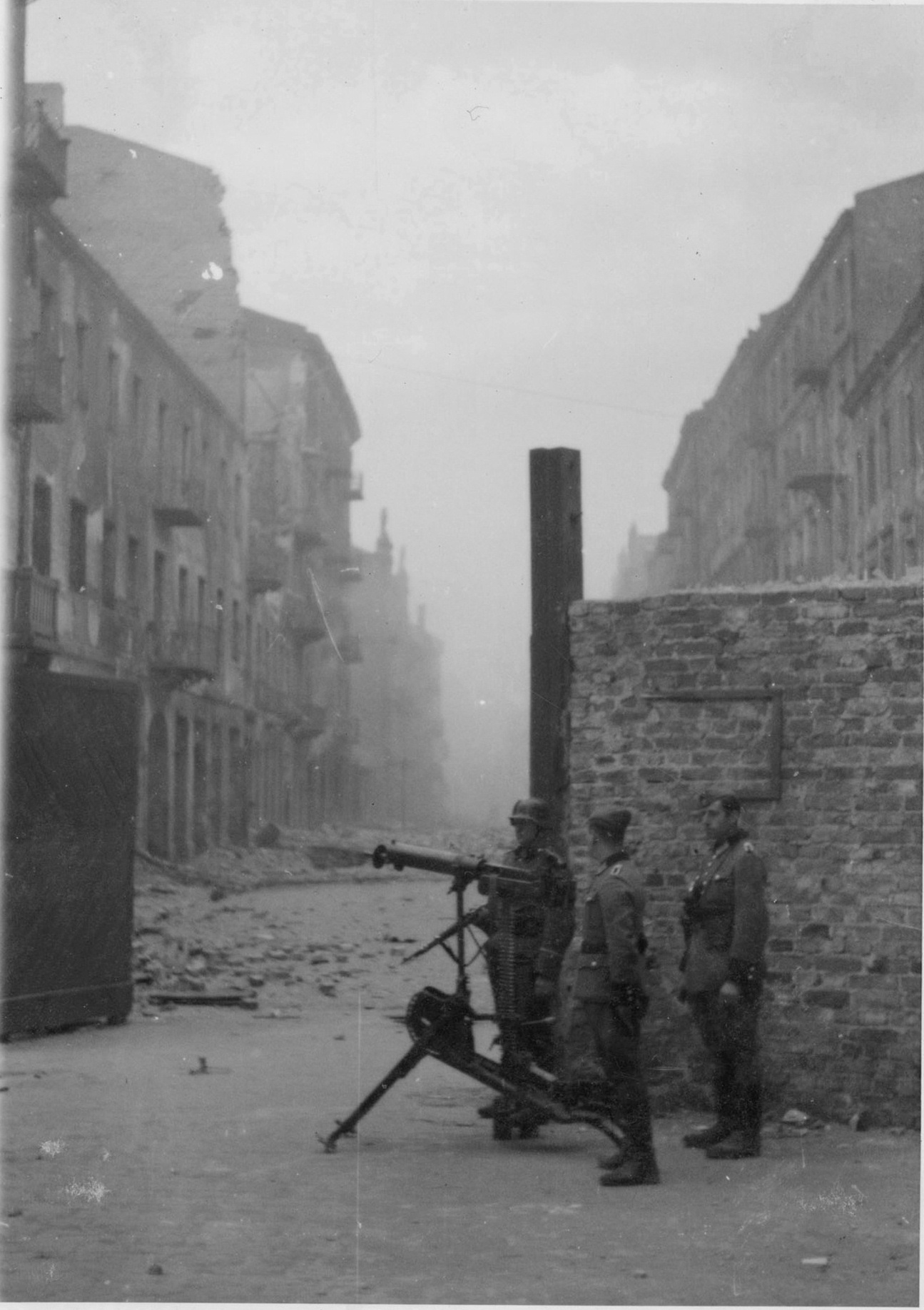
NARA copy #37, IPN copy #35
Securing a street
MG08 at the gate on Nowolipie Street intersection with Smocza Street, looking East. In the back Nowolipie 56.

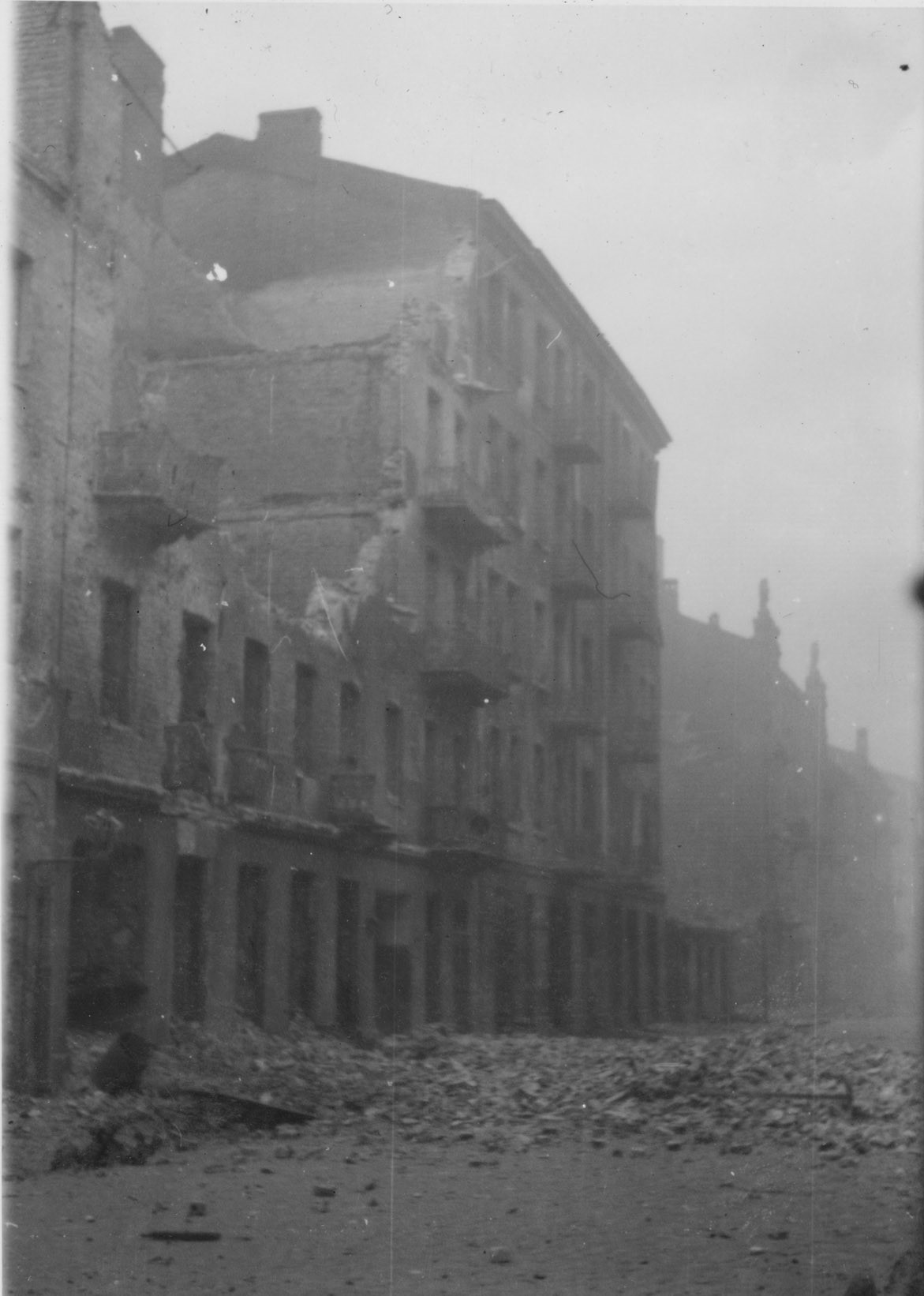
NARA copy #45
(No image caption, in section This is how the former Ghetto looks after having been destroyed)
Nowolipie 56 in the center.

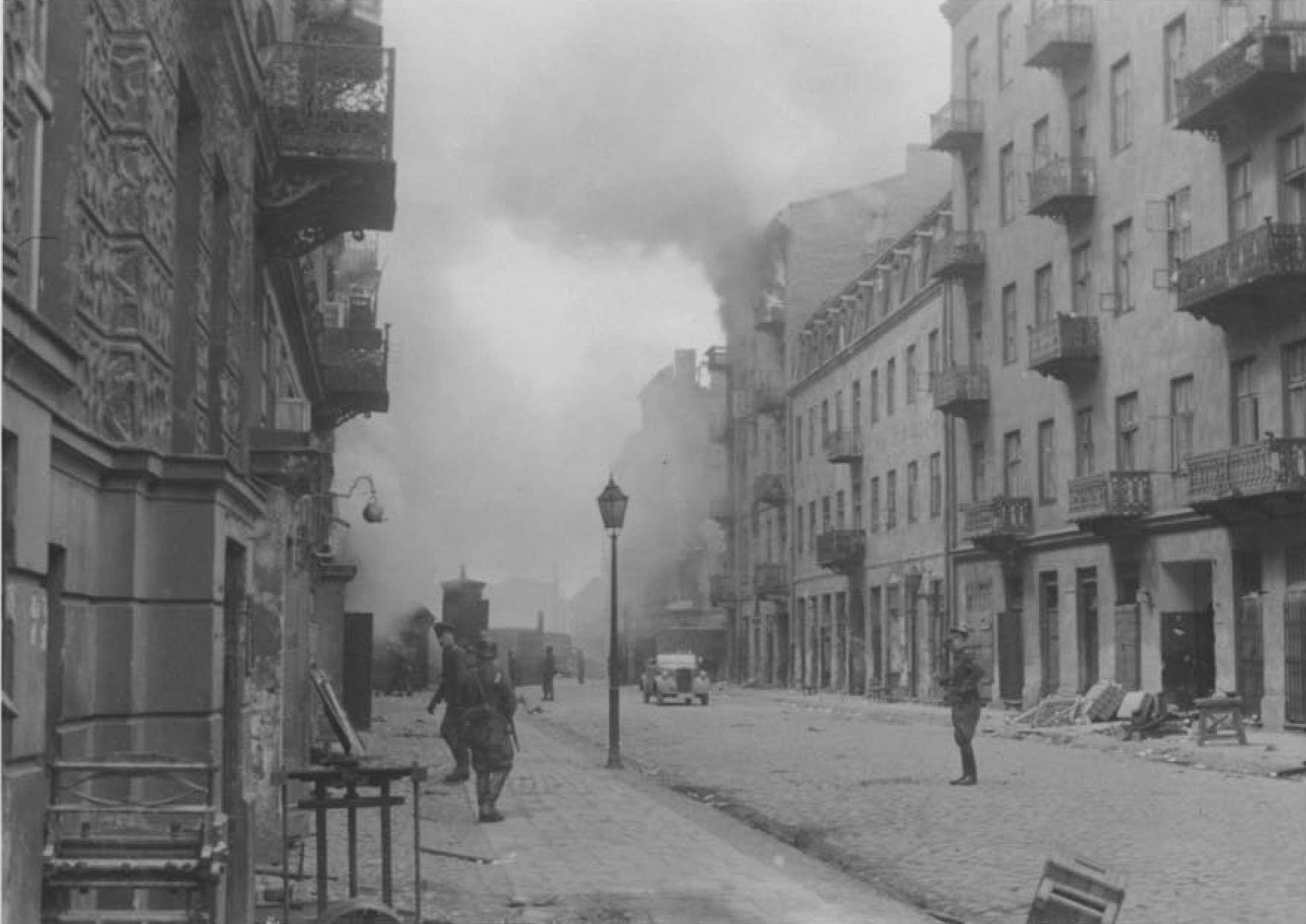
IPN copy #45
(No image caption, in section This is how the former Ghetto looks after having been destroyed)
Nowolipie Street looking West towards the gate at Nowolipie / Smocza intersection.

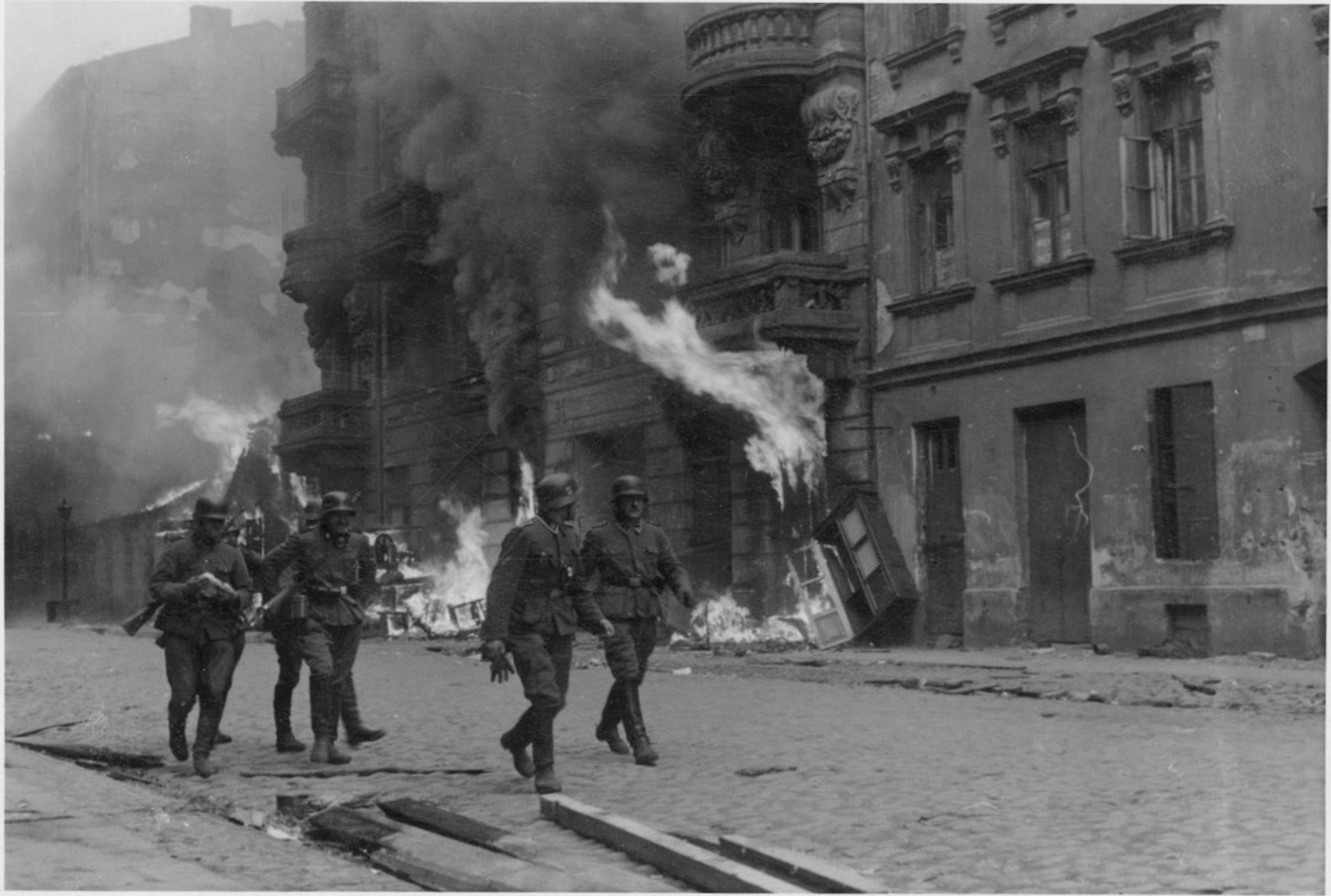
NARA copy #11, IPN copy #13
An assault squad
Waffen SS troops at Nowolipie Street with Nowolipie 50 A, 52, 54 and 56 in the back

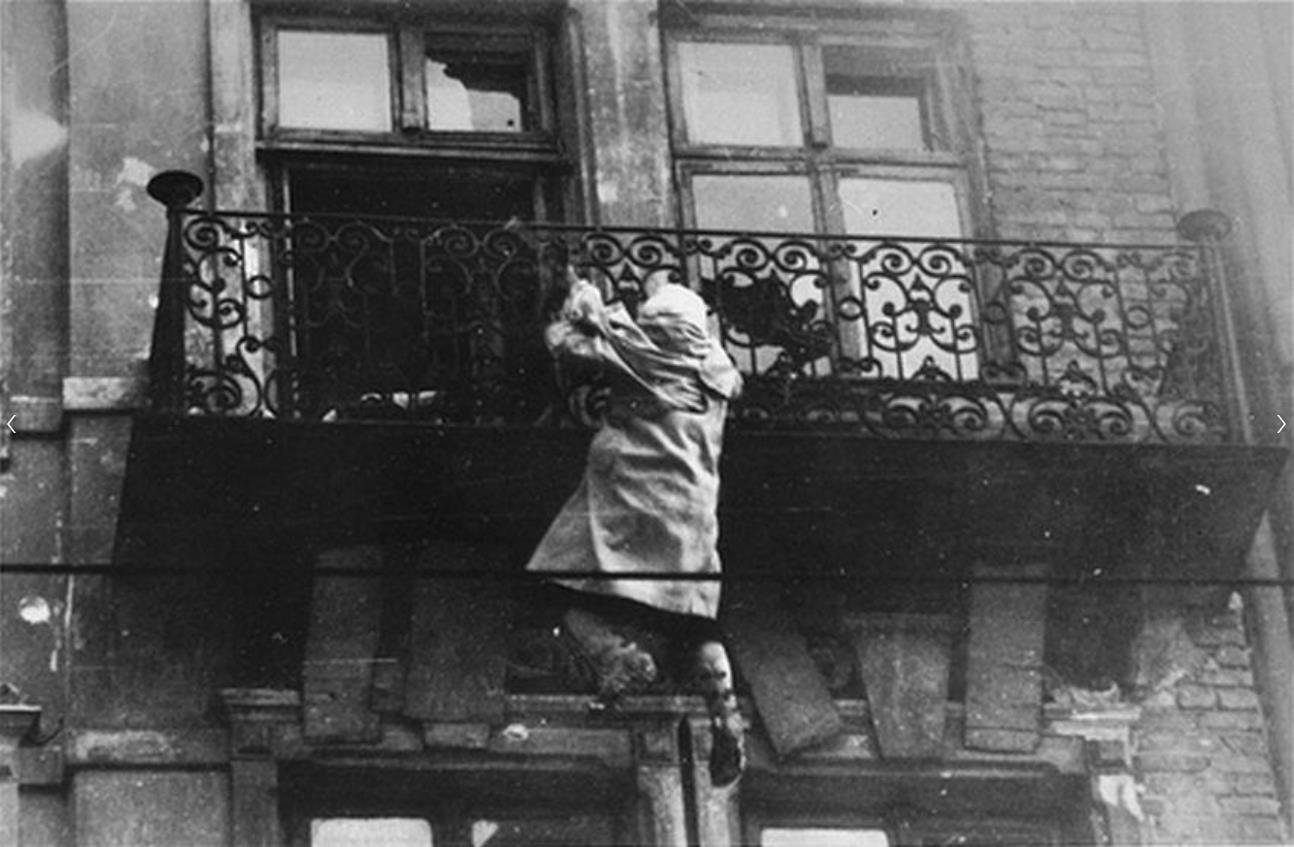
Stroop Collection-not in the report-taken at Nowolipie 63

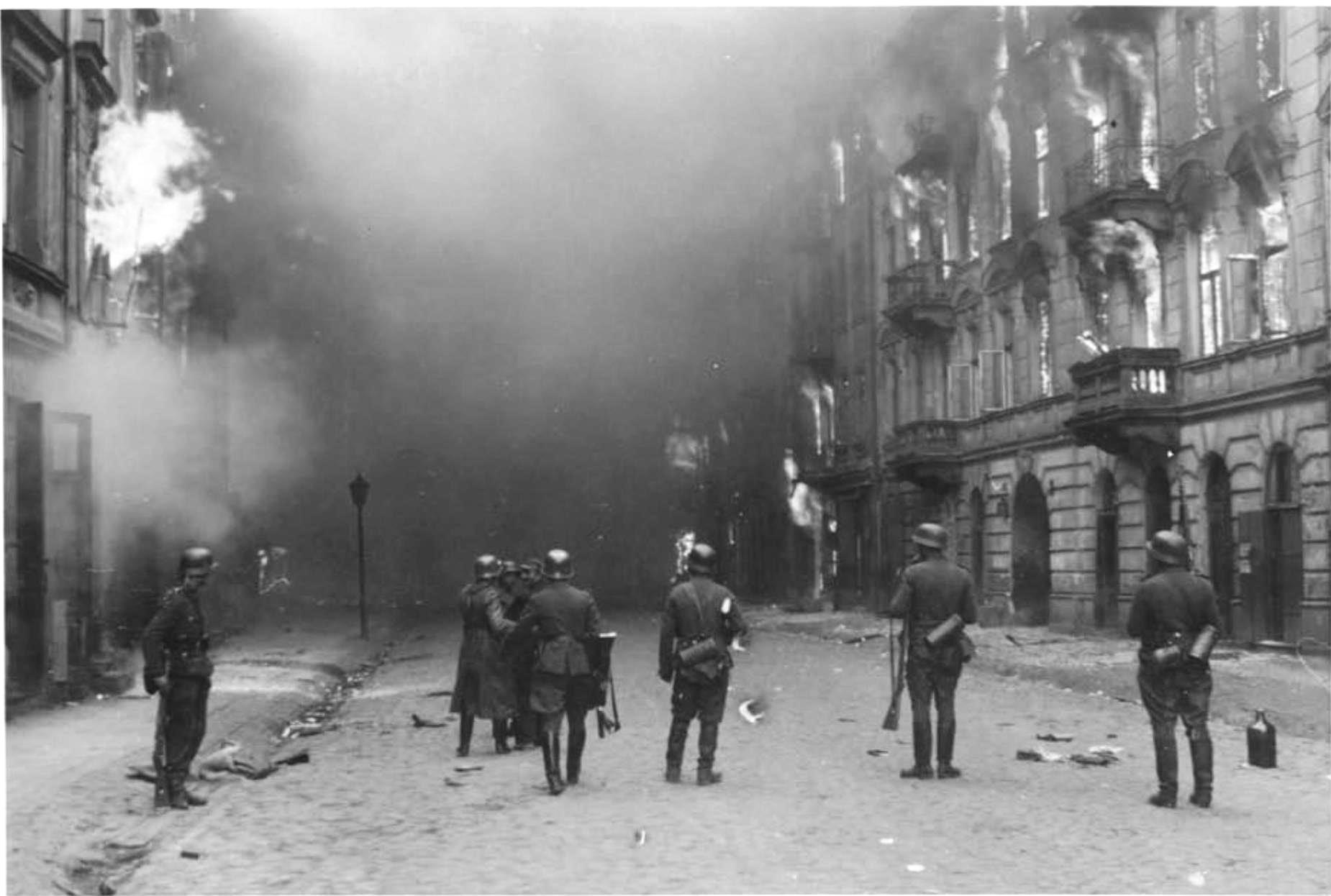
IPN copy #21
Smoking out the Jews and Bandits
Waffen SS troops at Nowolipie Street, between Smocza and Karmelicka Streets, with Nowolipie 34 on the right

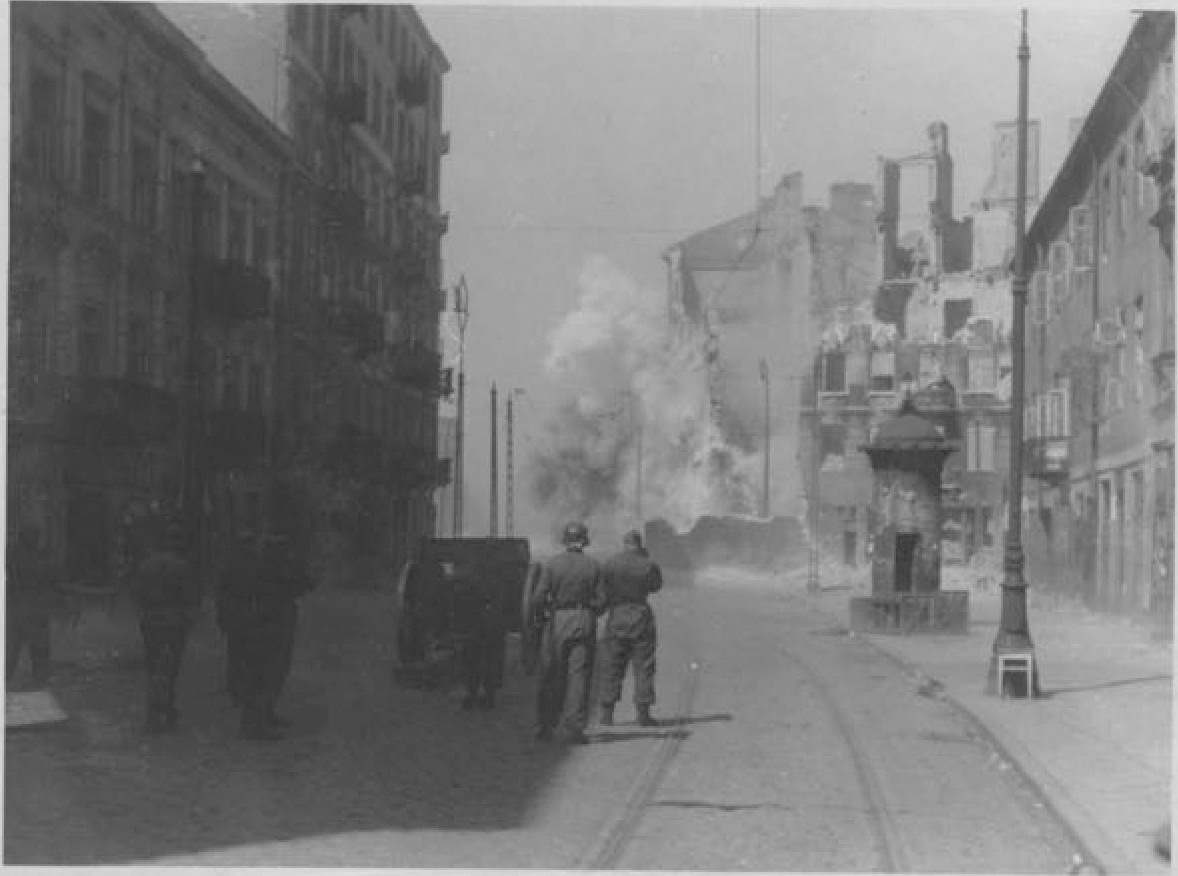
IPN copy #37
Fight against a resistance pocket
Cannon on Zamenhofa Street shooting North at resistance in Gęsia 20 building

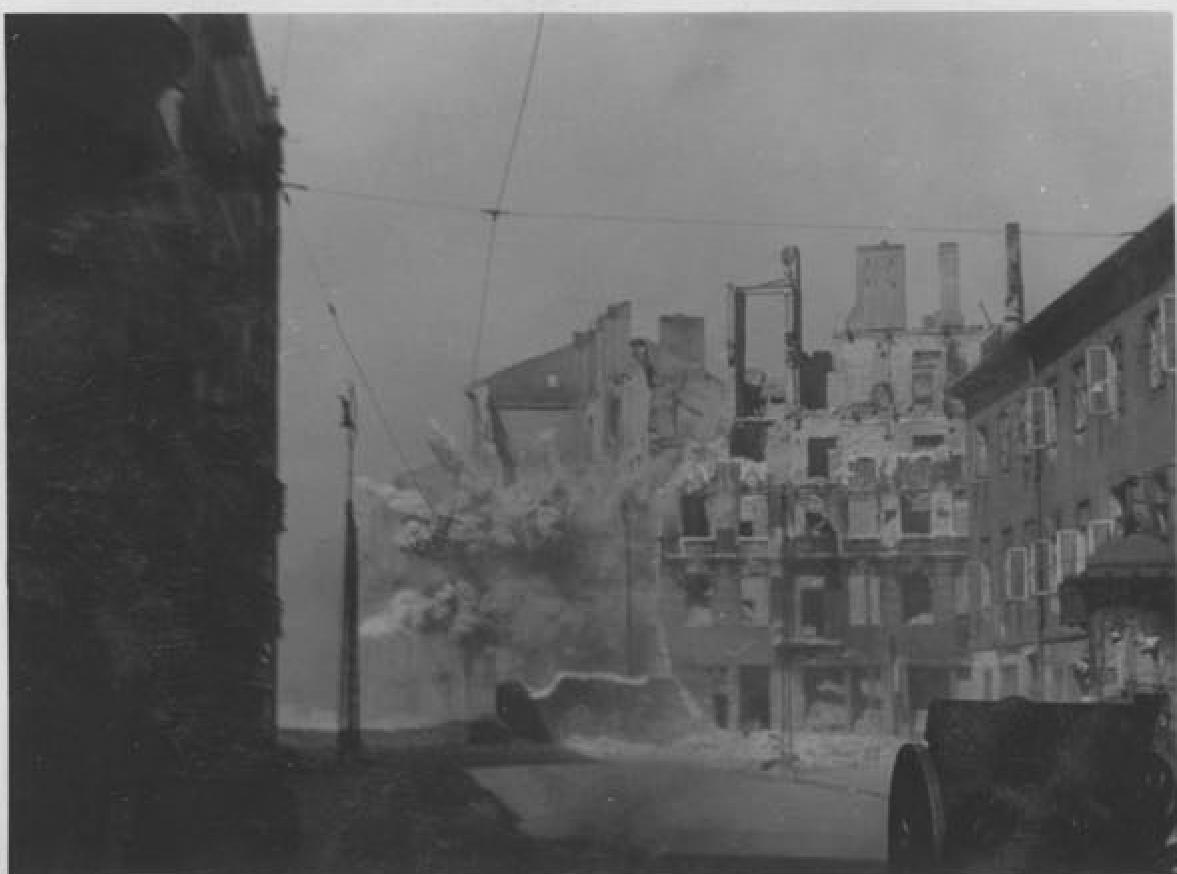
IPN copy #38
Fight against a resistance pocket
Cannon on Zamenhofa Street shooting North at resistance in Gęsia 20 building

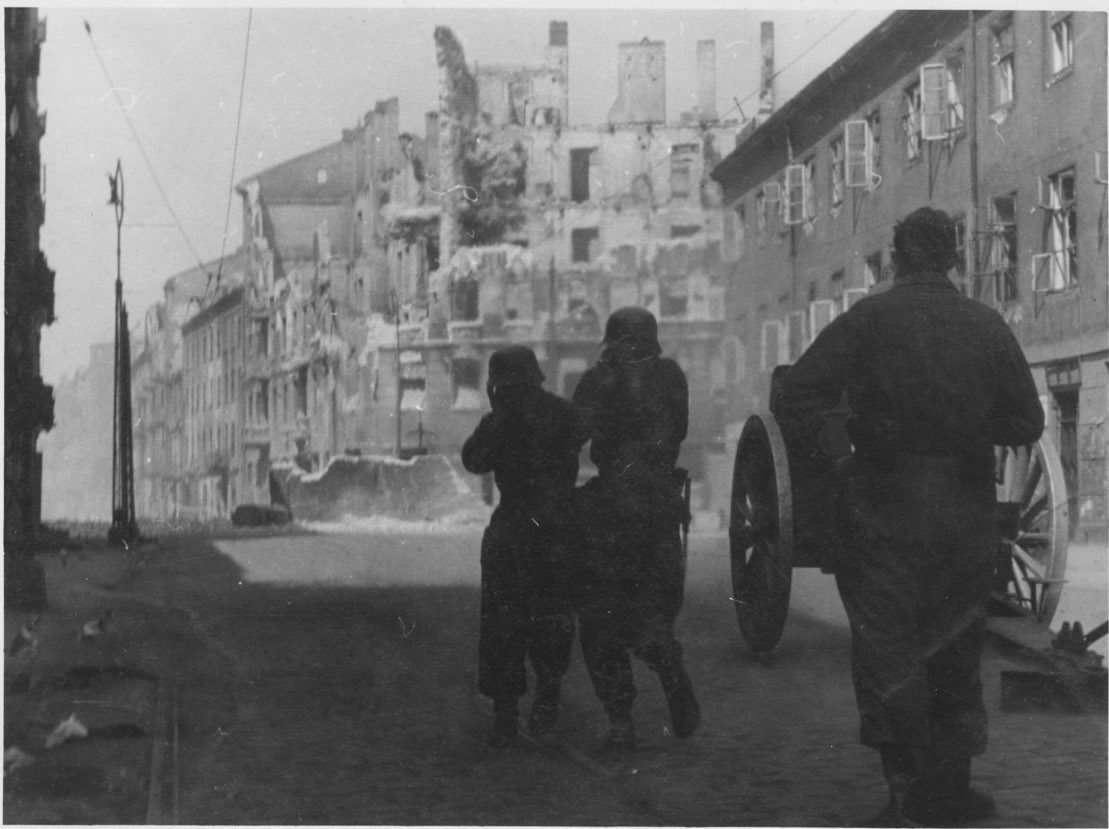
NARA copy #25
Destruction of a housing block
Cannon on Zamenhofa Street shooting North at resistance in Gęsia 20 building

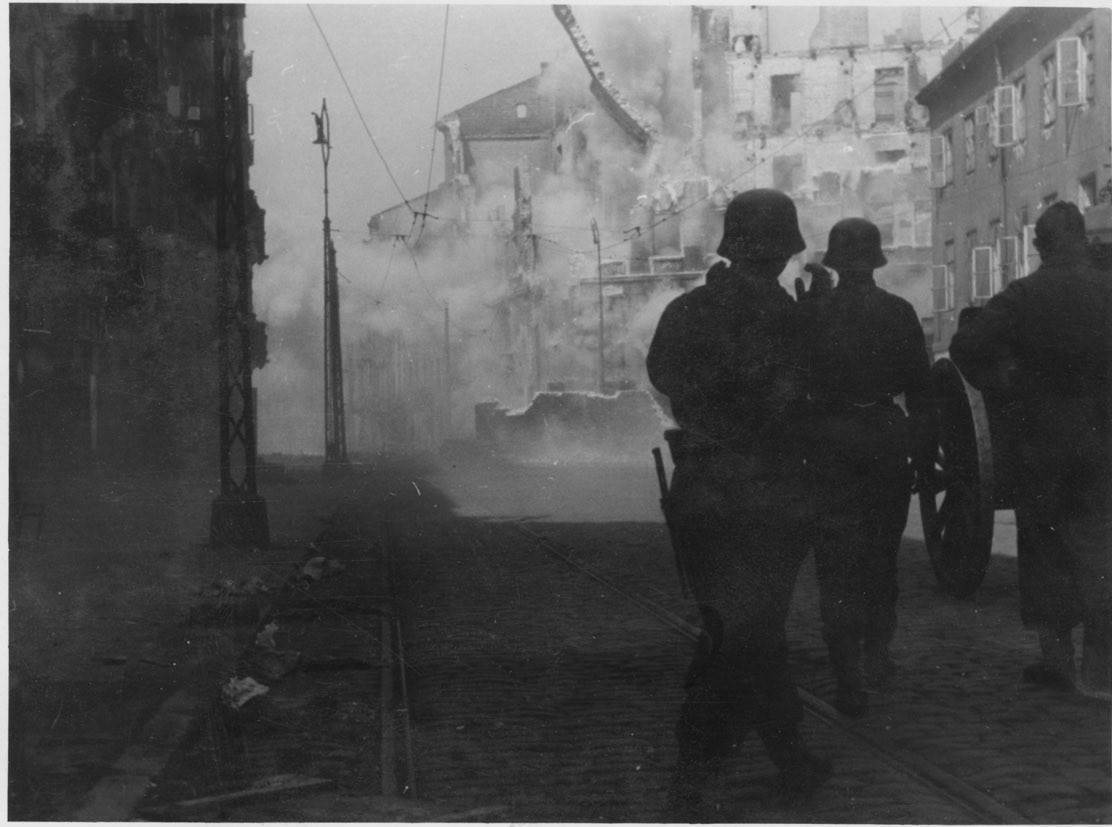
NARA copy #26
Destruction of a housing block
Cannon on Zamenhofa Street shooting North at resistance in Gęsia 20 building

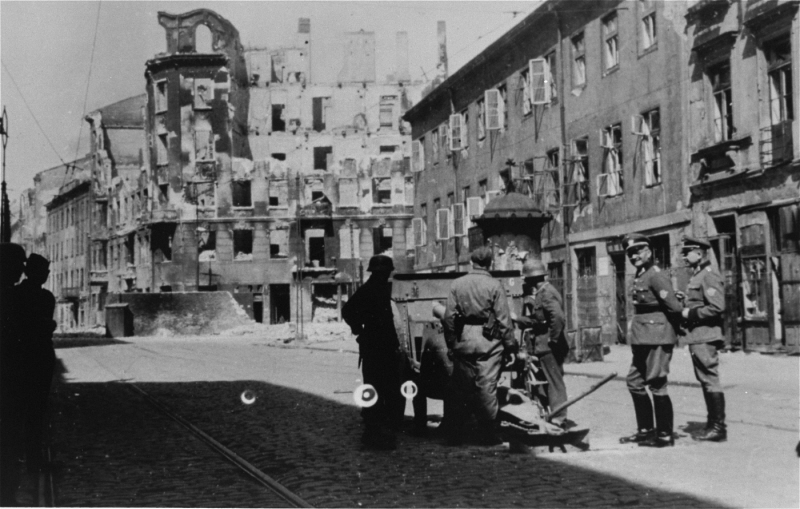
Stroop Collection, not in the report
Cannon on Zamenhofa Street shooting North at resistance in Gęsia 20 building

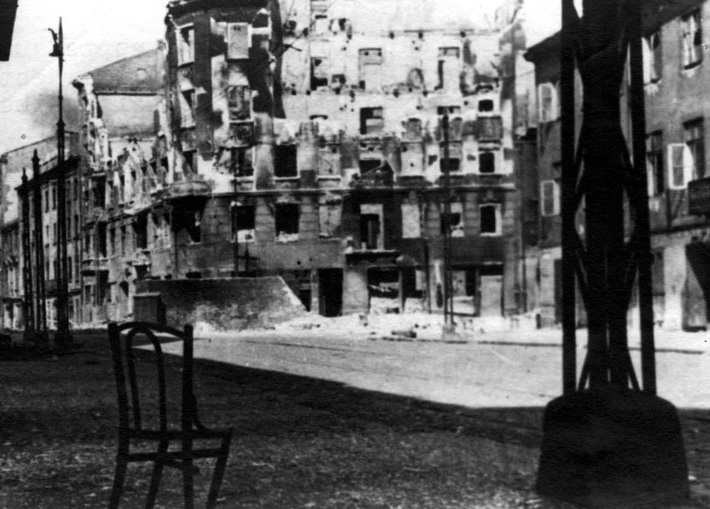
Stroop Collection, not in the report
Zamenhofa Street looking North at resistance in Gęsia 20 building

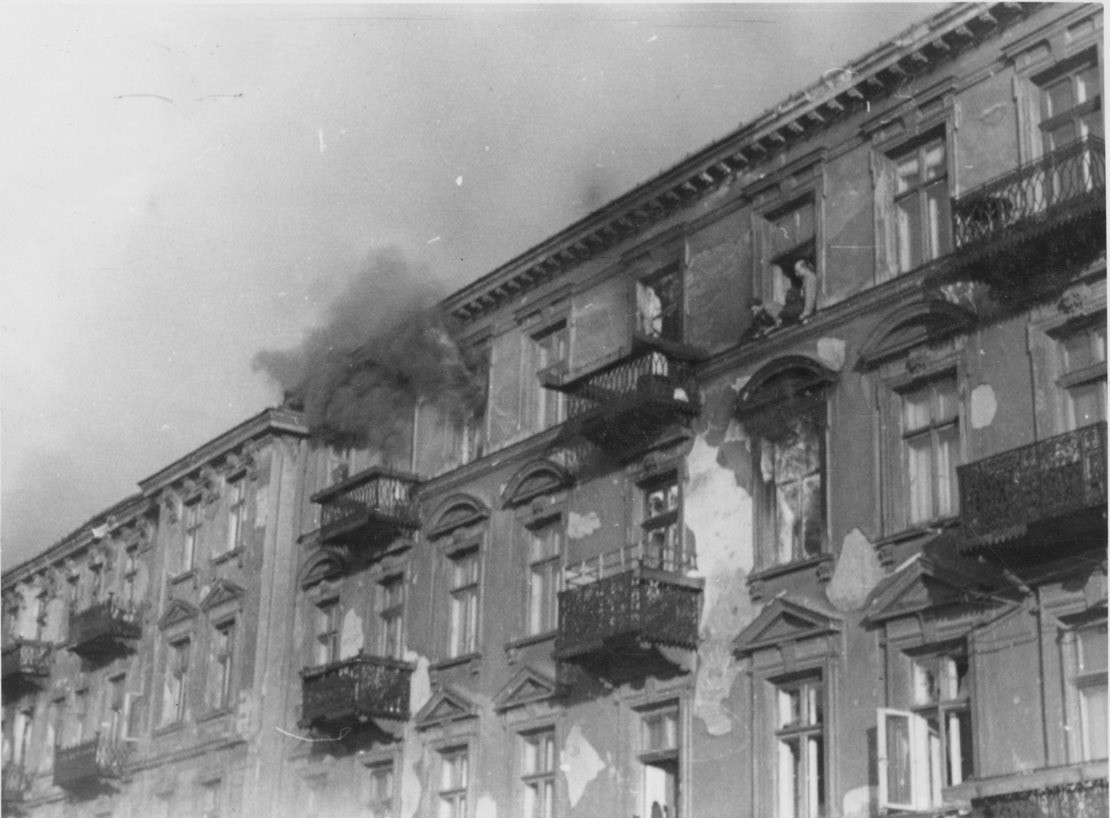
NARA copy #39
Bandits jump to escape capture
Men preparing to commit suicide by jumping off the upper floors of 23 and 25 Niska Street. 22 April 1943

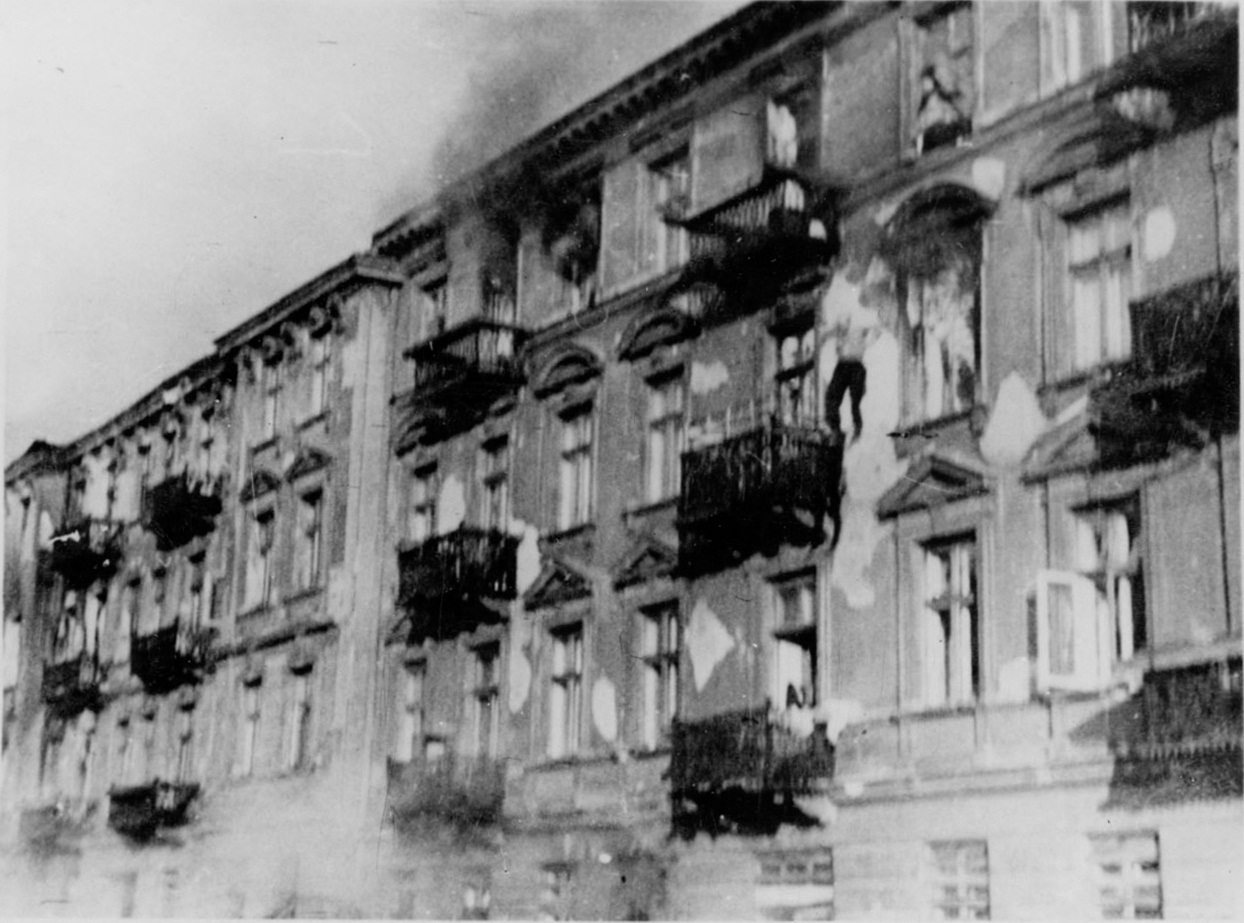
NARA copy #53, IPN copy #39
Bandits jump to escape capture
Man committing suicide by jumping off the upper floors of 23 and 25 Niska Street. 22 April 1943

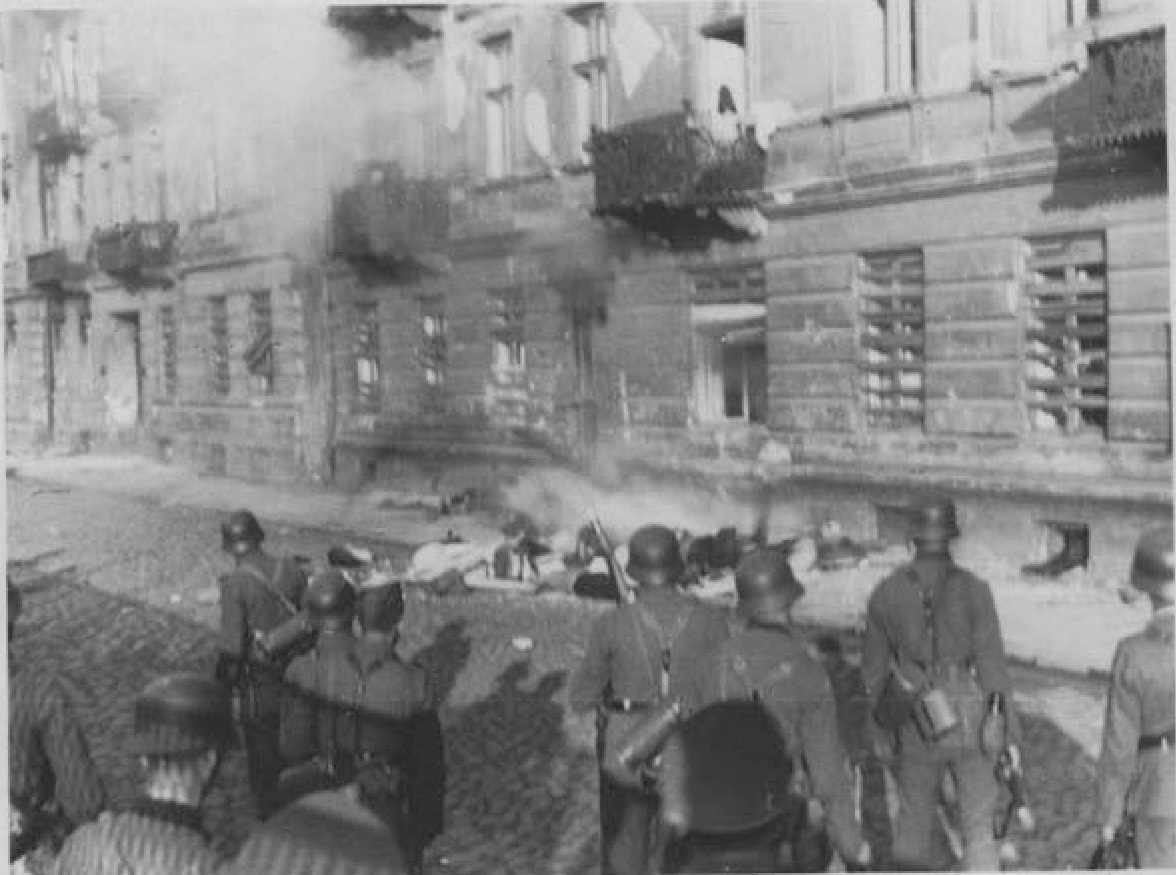
IPN copy #40
Bandits who jumped
People who committed suicide by jumping off the upper floors of 23 and 25 Niska Street. 22 April 1943

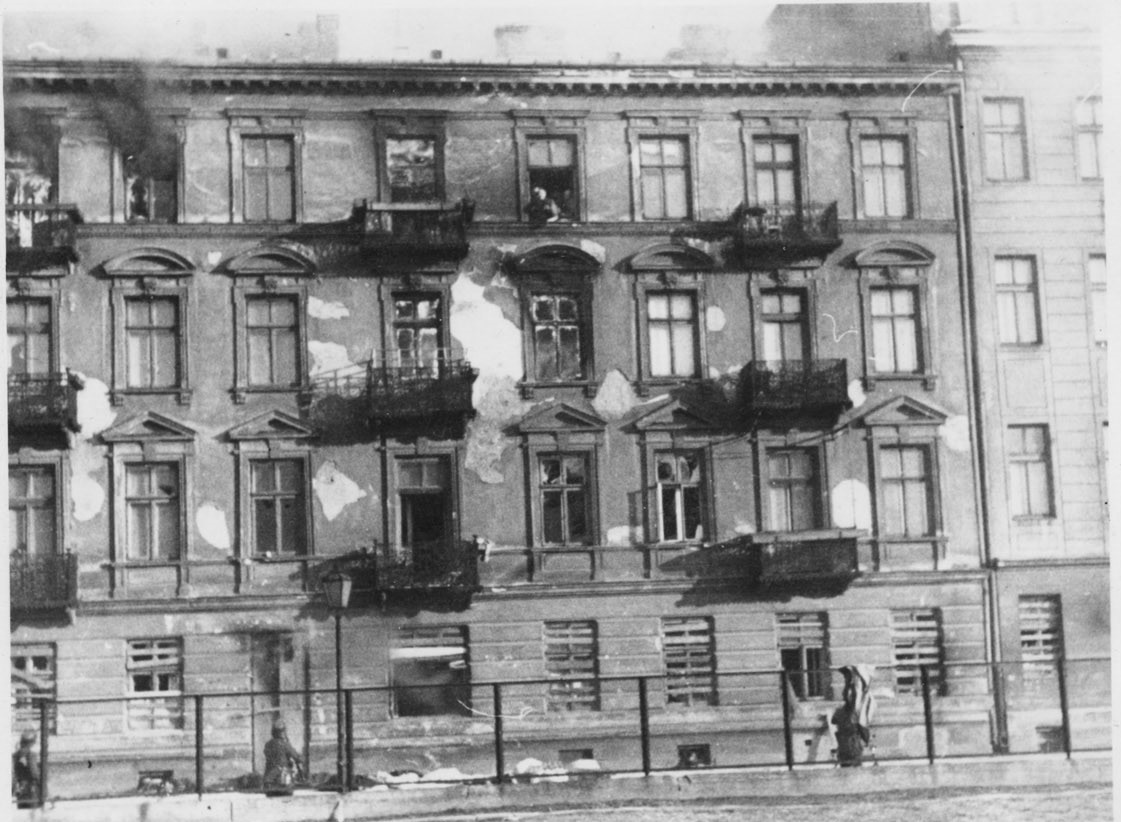
NARA copy #40
Bandits who jumped
People preparing to commit suicide by jumping off the upper floors of 23 and 25 Niska Street. 22 April 1943

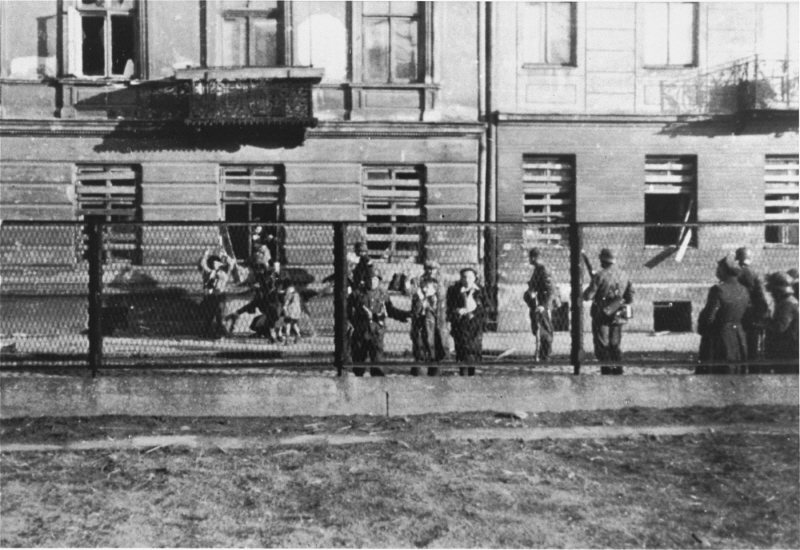
Stroop Collection, not in the report. 25 Niska Street 22 April 1943

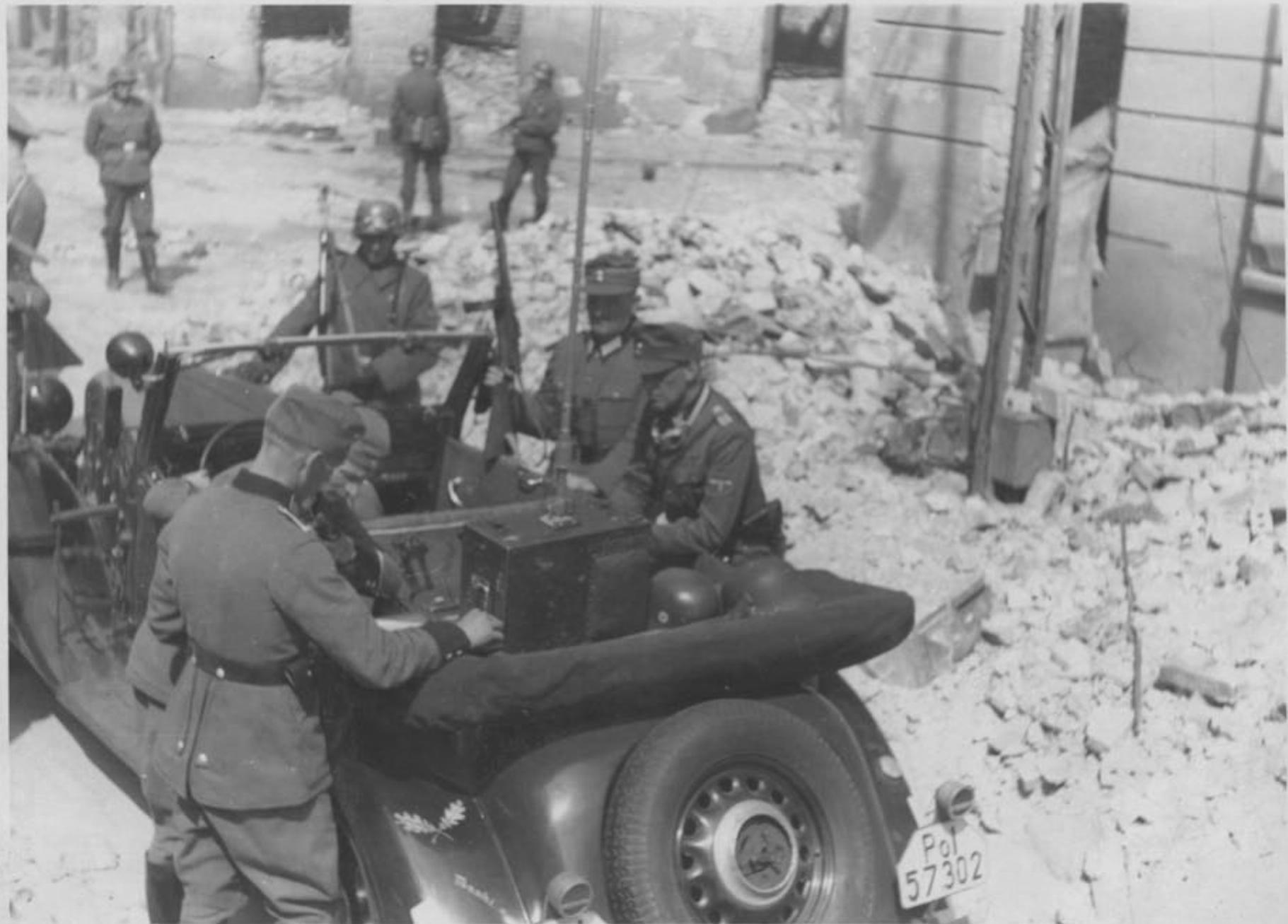
IPN copy #41
The radio car of the command post
Stroop near command car, probably at Zamenhofa 48 near intersection with Miła

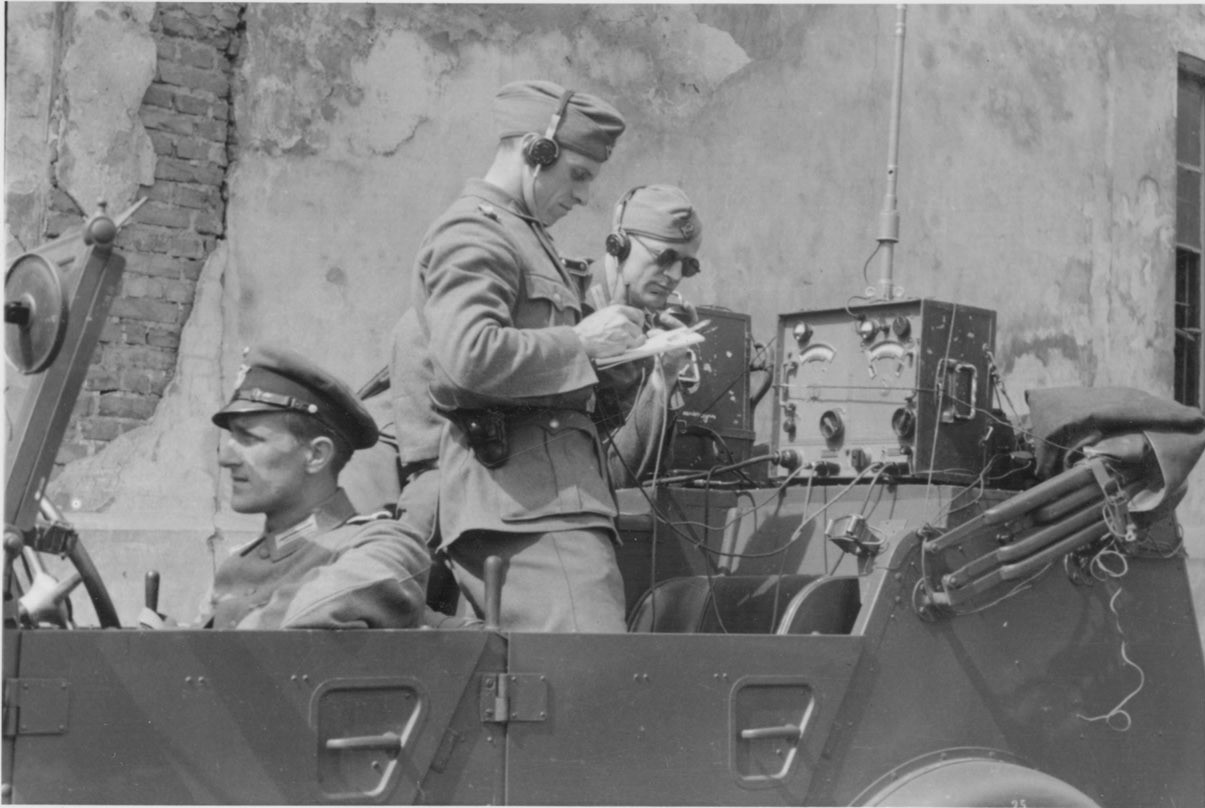
NARA copy #41
The radio car of the command post

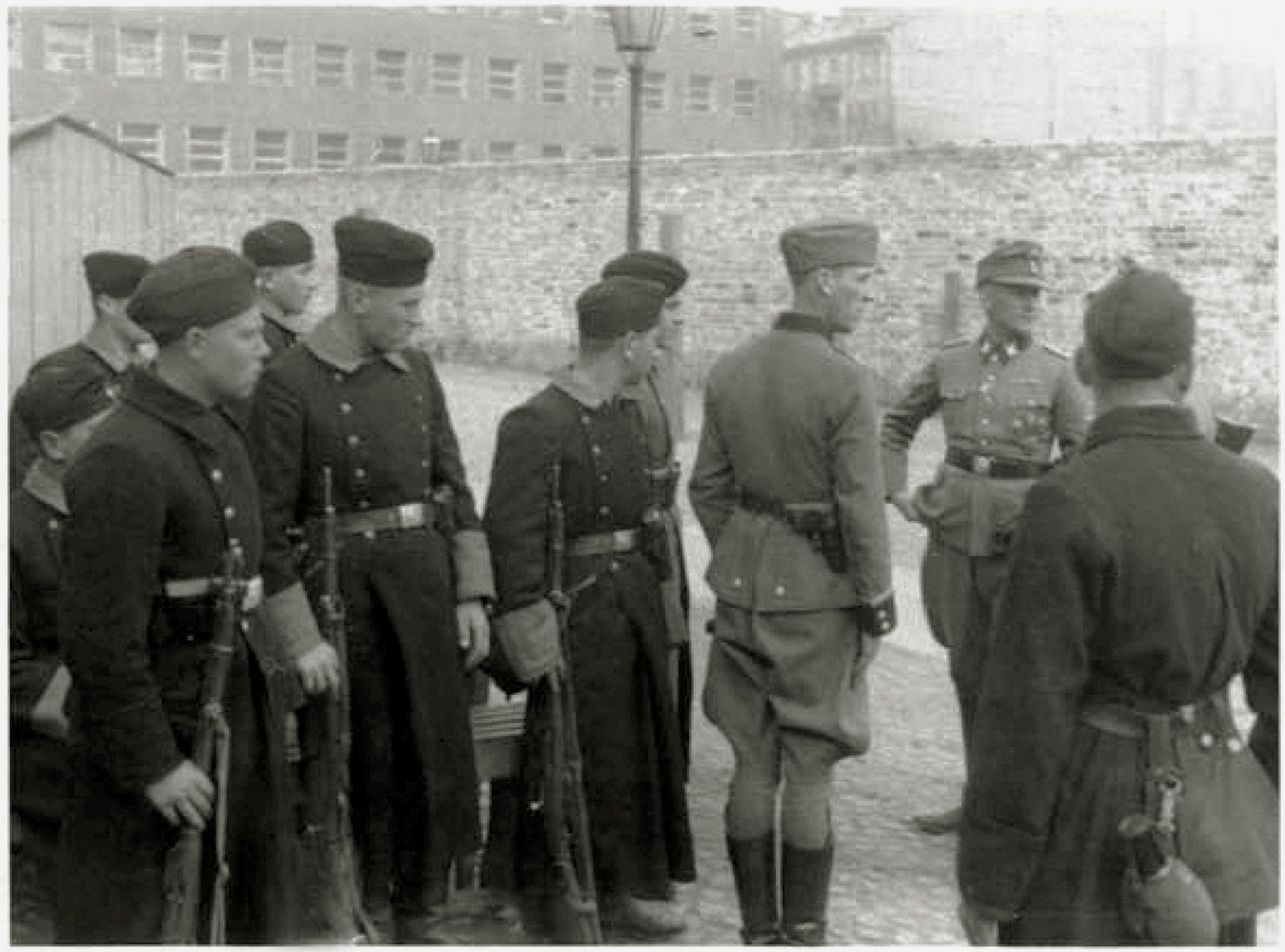
IPN copy #42
Askaris assigned to the operation
Stroop and foreign fighters at the Umschlagplatz, with Stawki 5/7 in the back

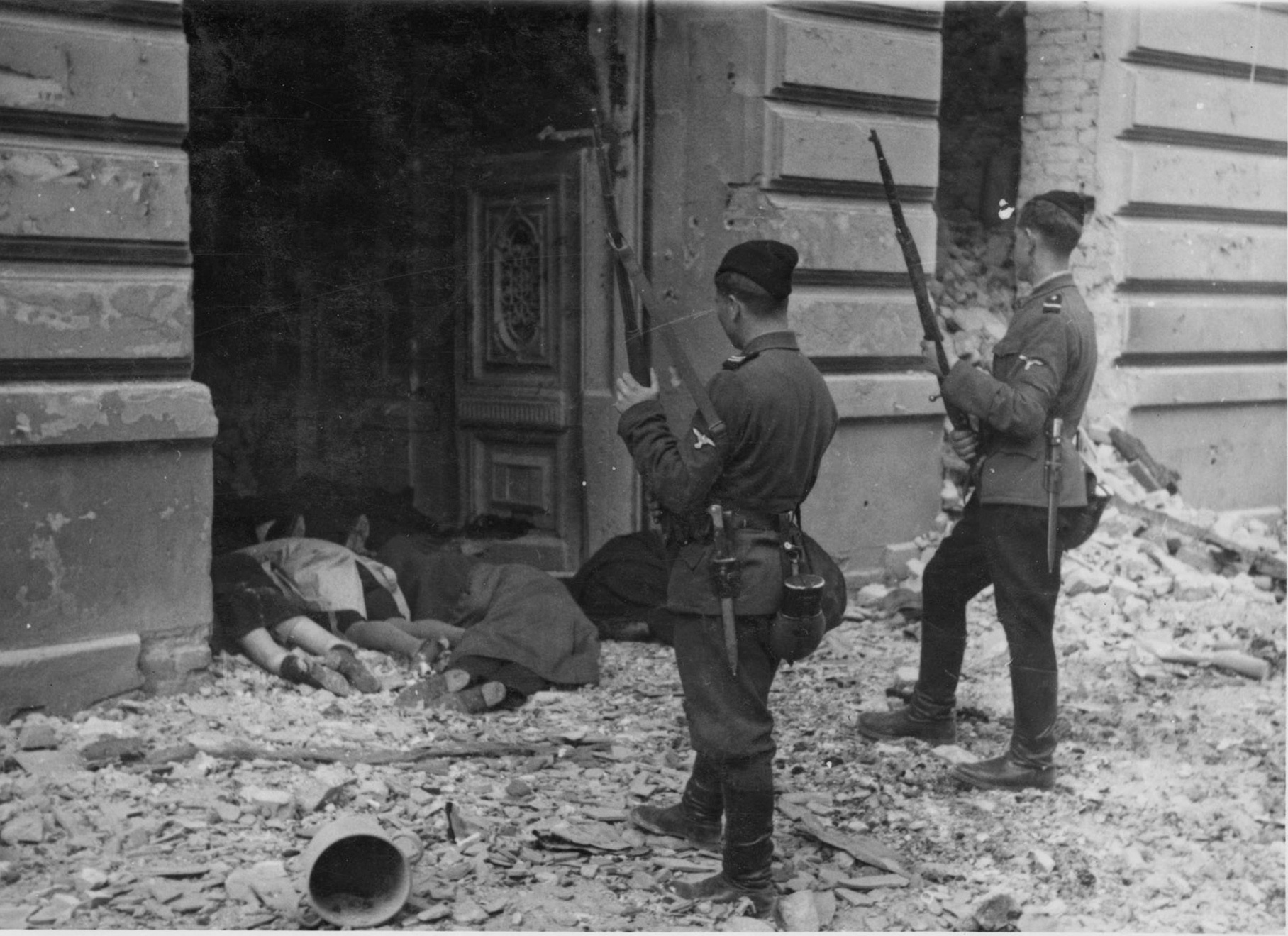
NARA copy #42
Askaris assigned to the operation
Foreign fighters and executed Jews at Zamenhofa 42 / Kupiecka 18

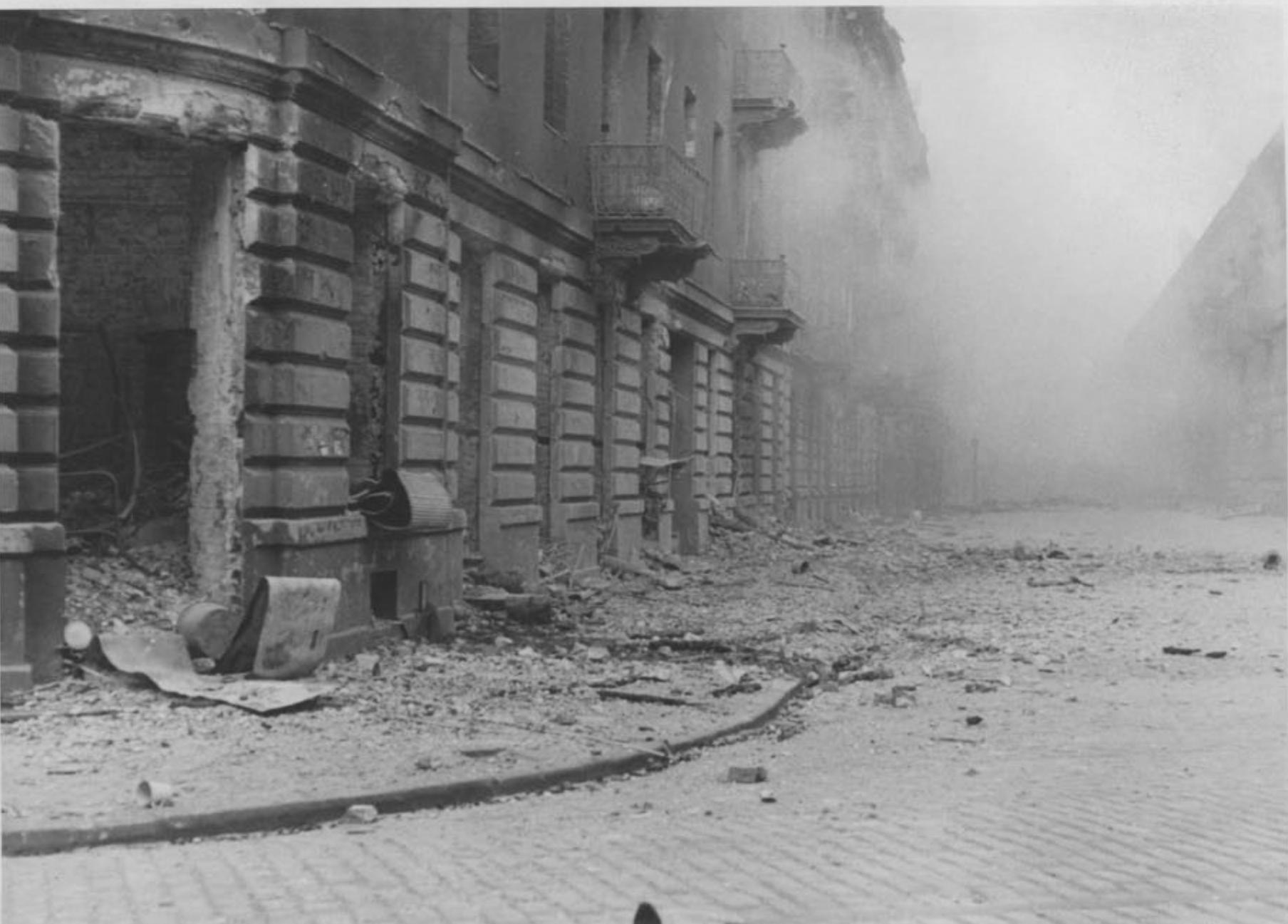
NARA copy #46, IPN copy #46
(No image caption, in section This is how the former Ghetto looks after having been destroyed)
Ulica Kupiecka Street viewed from Zamenhofa, with Zamenhofa 42 / Kupiecka 18 on the left

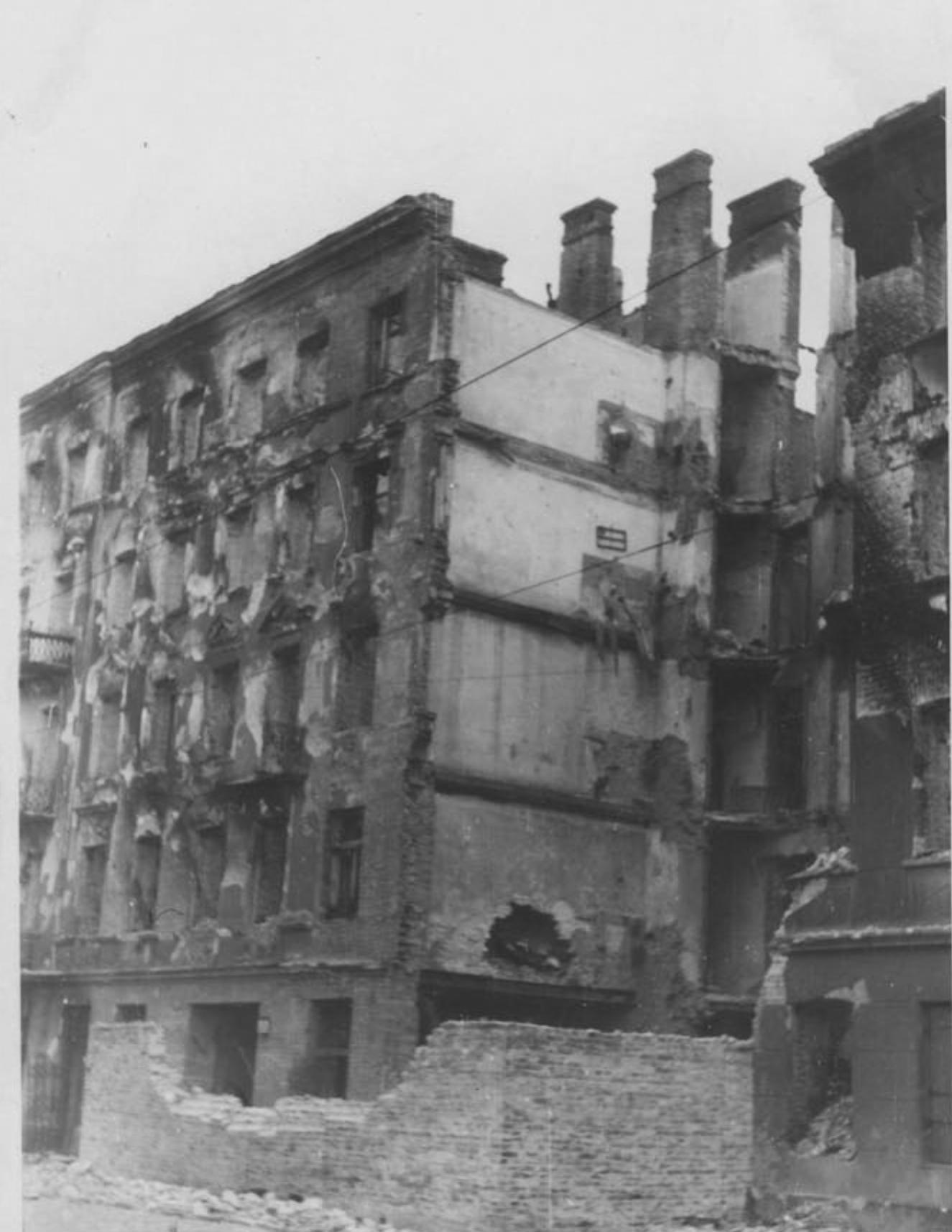
IPN copy #49
(No image caption, in section This is how the former Ghetto looks after having been destroyed)
Possibly Dzielna 5

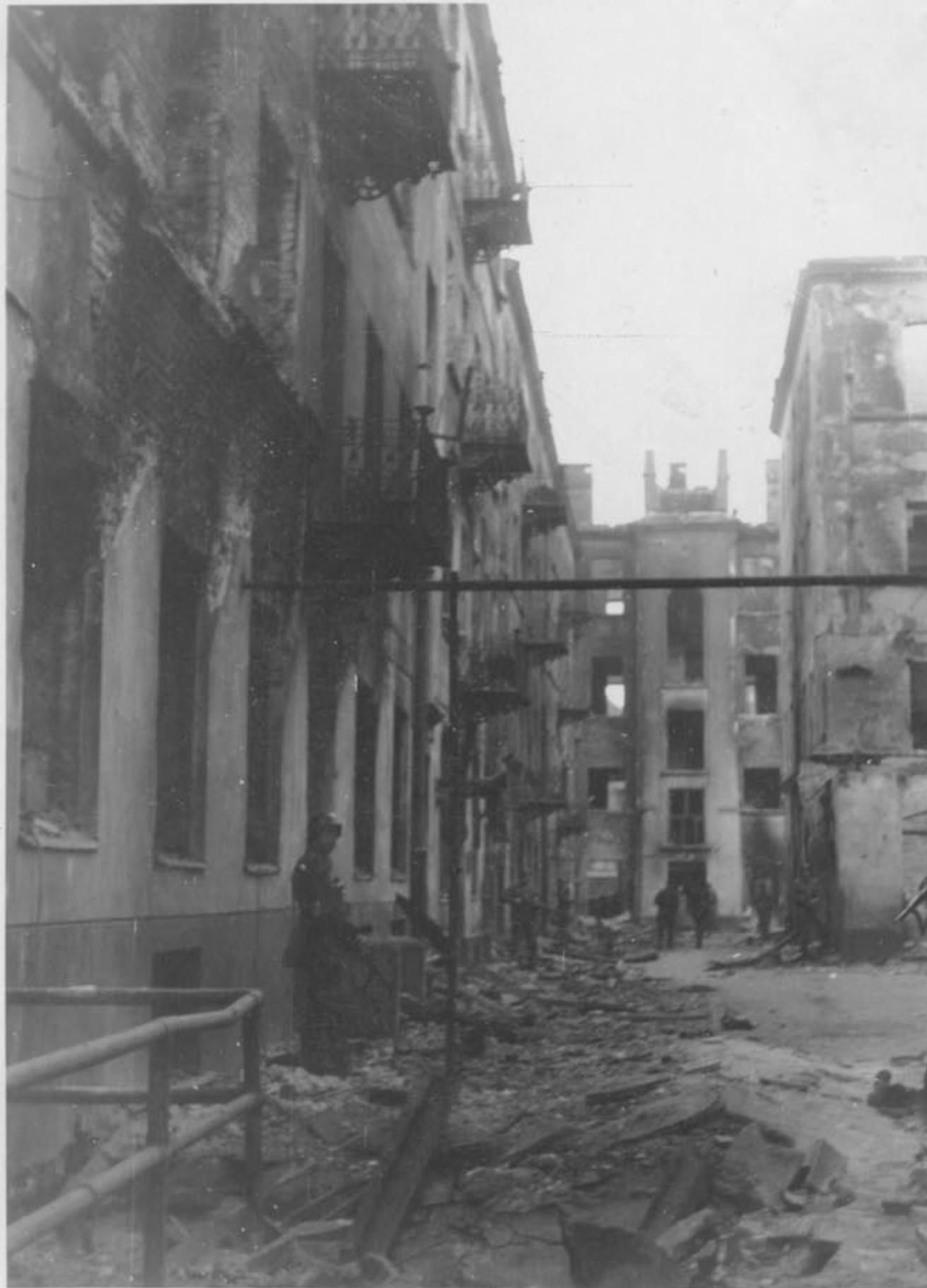
NARA copy #49, IPN copy #51
(No image caption, in section This is how the former Ghetto looks after having been destroyed)
Probably court yard of Franciszkańską 26

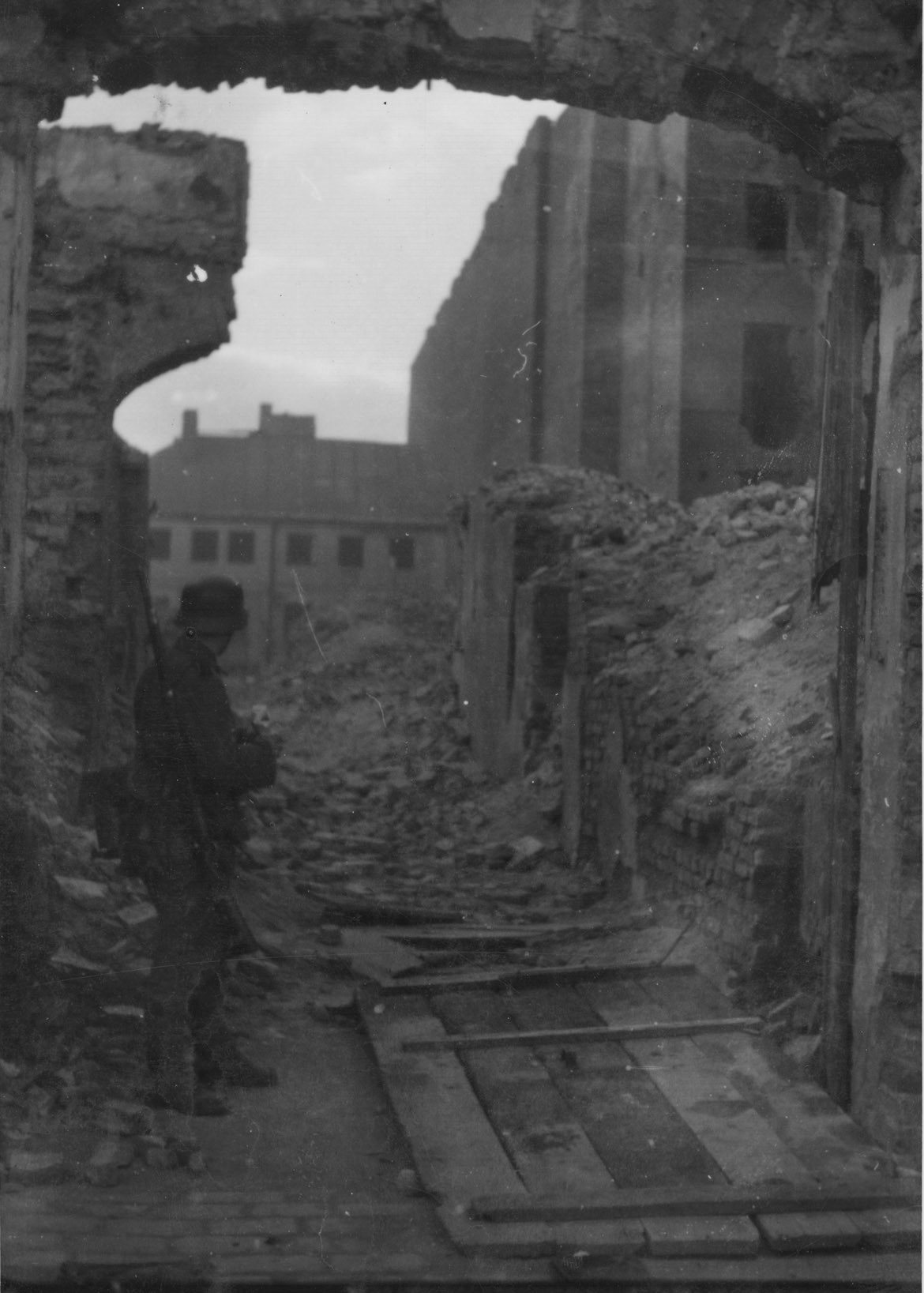
NARA copy #48
(No image caption, in section This is how the former Ghetto looks after having been destroyed)
Probably court yard of Franciszkańską 30

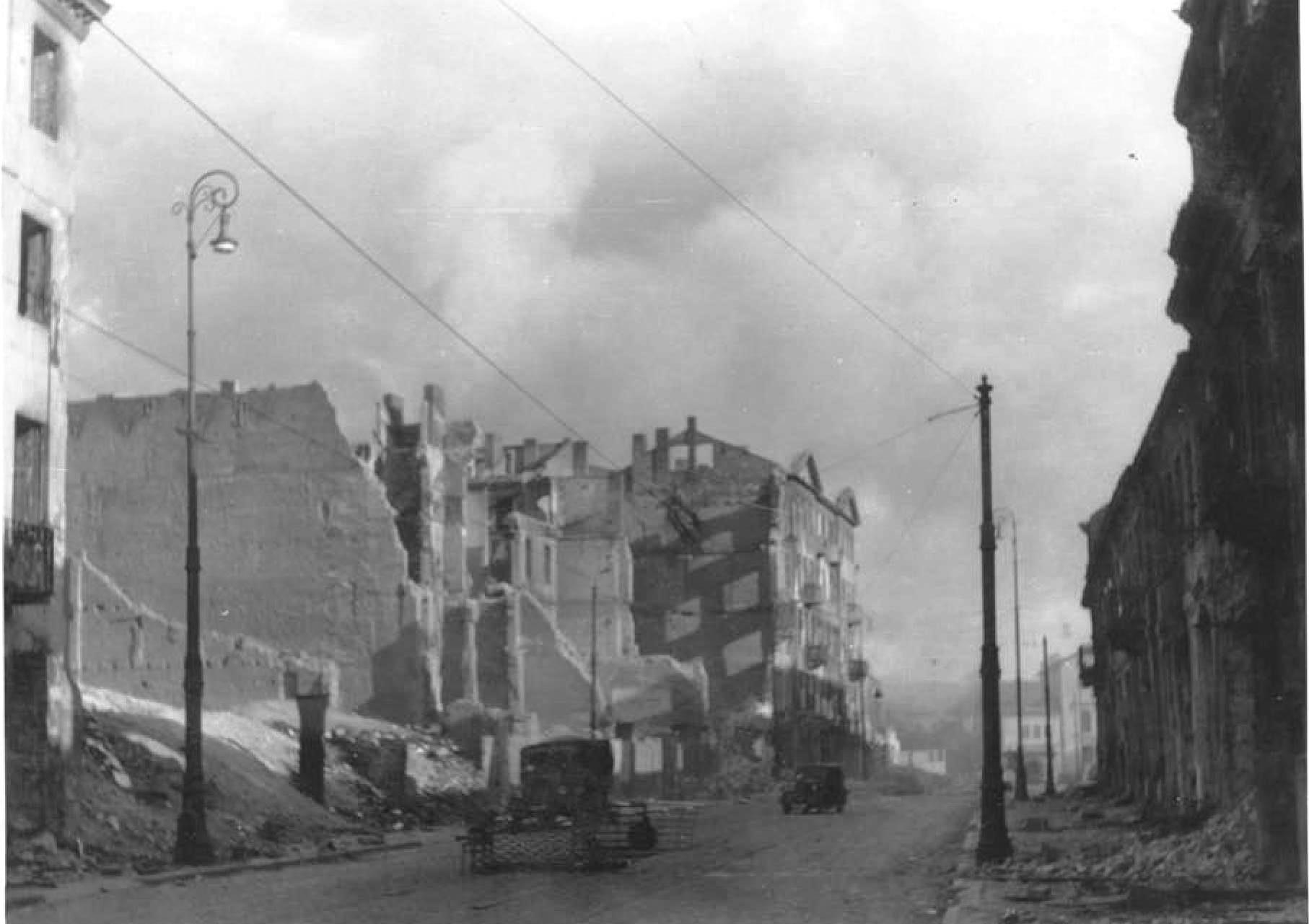
NARA copy #47, IPN copy #50
(No image caption, in section This is how the former Ghetto looks after having been destroyed)
Nalewki Street, looking South from the gate at Nalewki/Gęsia/Franciszkańska intersection

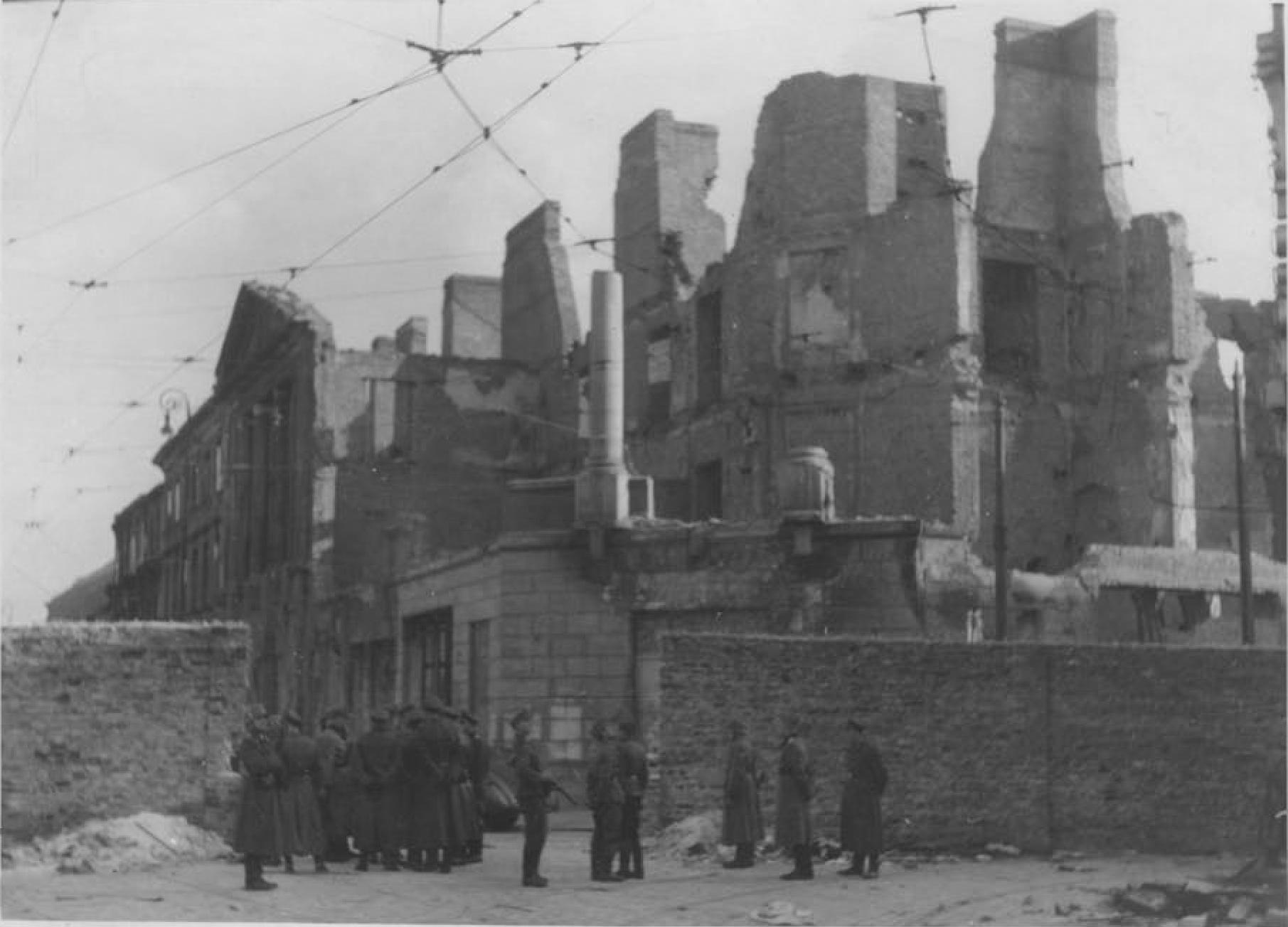
IPN copy #53
(No image caption, in section This is how the former Ghetto looks after having been destroyed)
Nalewki Street, looking South at the gate at Nalewki/Gęsia/Franciszkańska intersection. Beyond the wall on the right Posner house at Nalewkach 29.

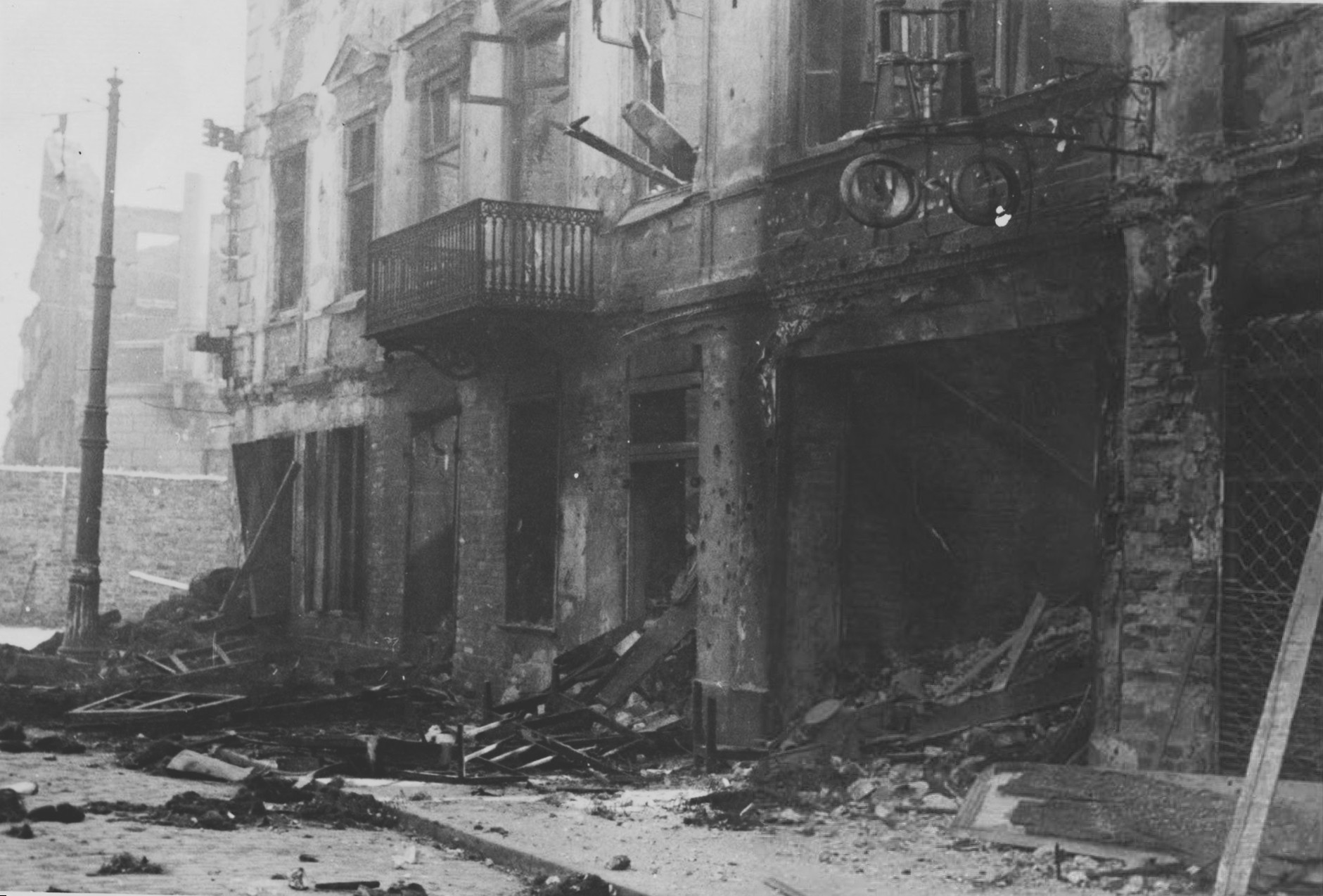
NARA copy #50, IPN copy #47
(No image caption, in section This is how the former Ghetto looks after having been destroyed)
On the right Nalewki 31/Gęsia 2, and on the left a view South at Nalewki Street towards ghetto gate at Nalewki/Gęsia/Franciszkańska intersection

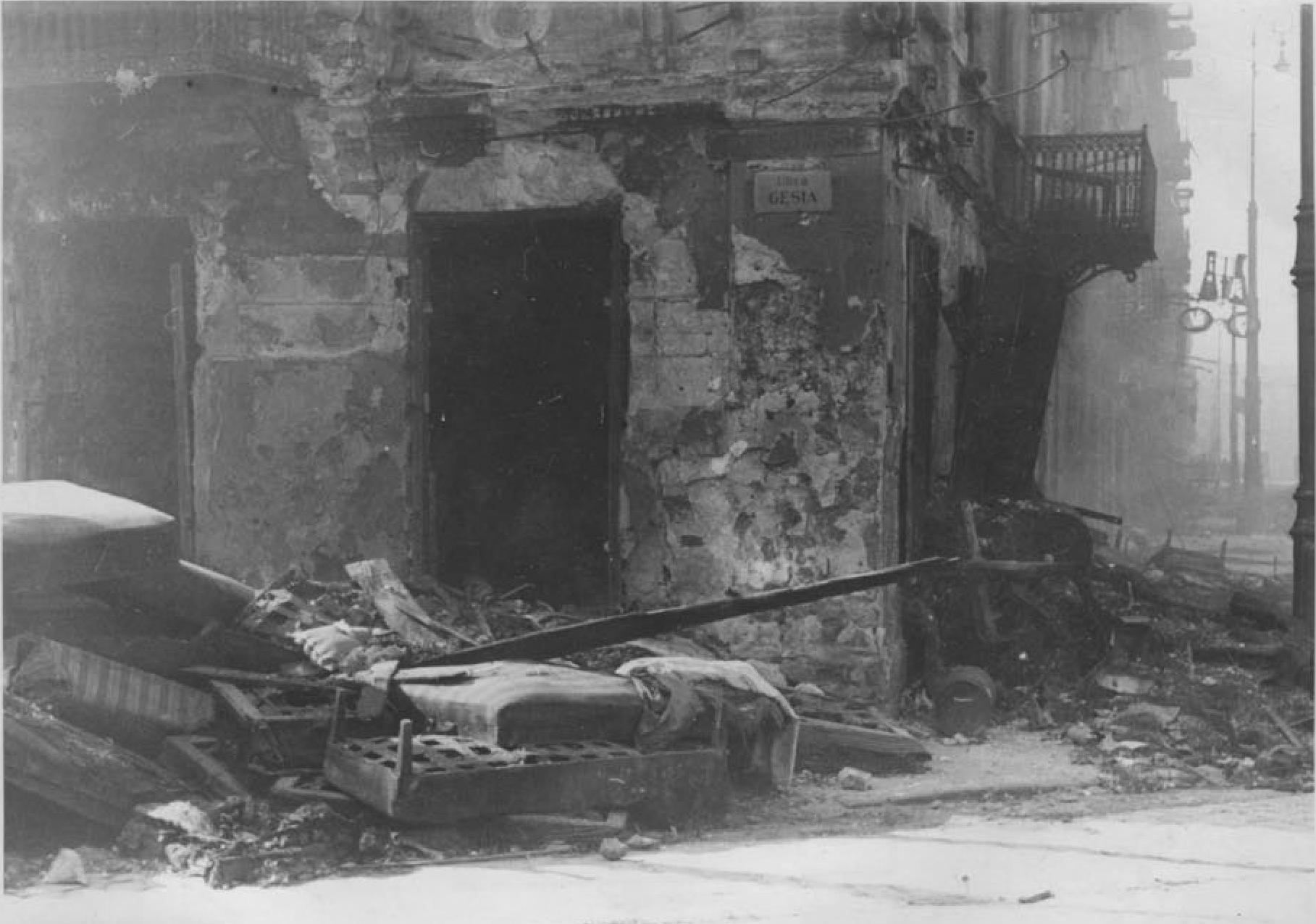
NARA copy #24, IPN copy #22
A place which has been prepared for escape and jumping down
On the left Nalewki 31/Gęsia 2, and on the right view North at Nalewki Street

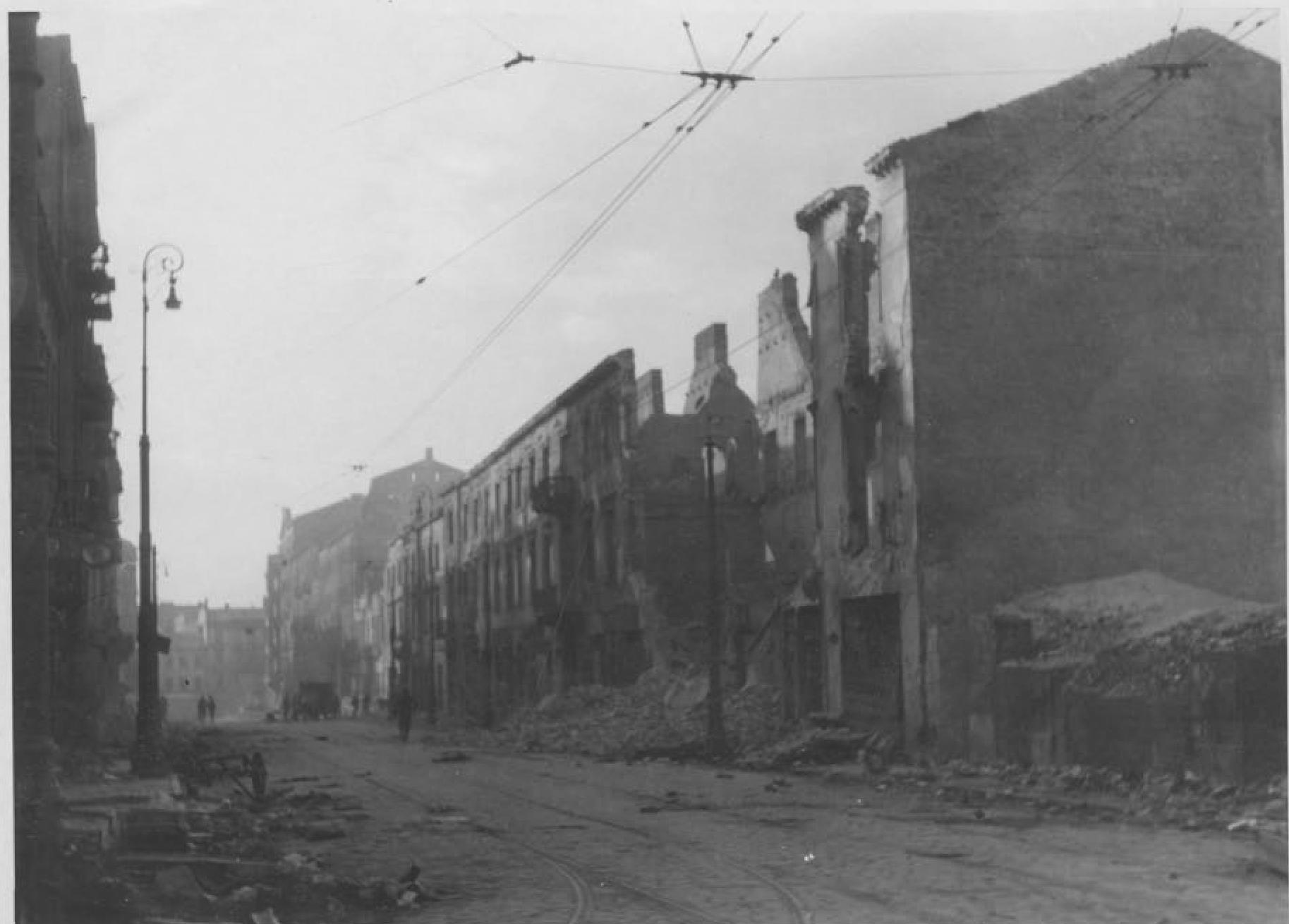
NARA copy #52, IPN copy #52
(No image caption, in section This is how the former Ghetto looks after having been destroyed)
Nalewki Street, viewed from Gęsia Street looking North, with Nalewki 31/Gęsia 2 on the left

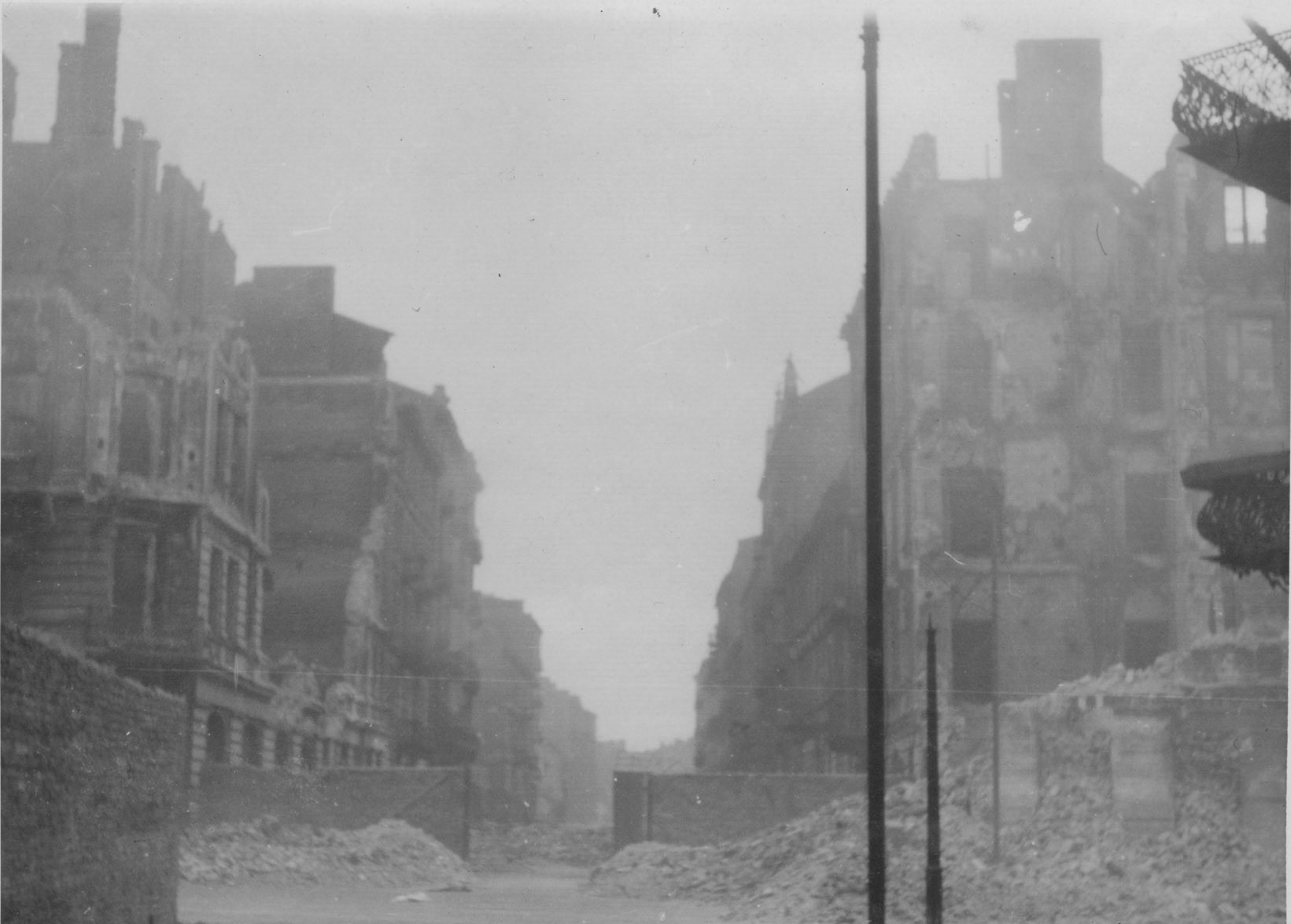
NARA copy #51
(No image caption, in section This is how the former Ghetto looks after having been destroyed)
Possibly Nowolipki / Smocza intersection looking West on Nowolipki Street

== Stroop Collection gallery ==
In addition to the pictures in his report Stroop also had related photographs of the Warsaw Ghetto Uprising in his possession

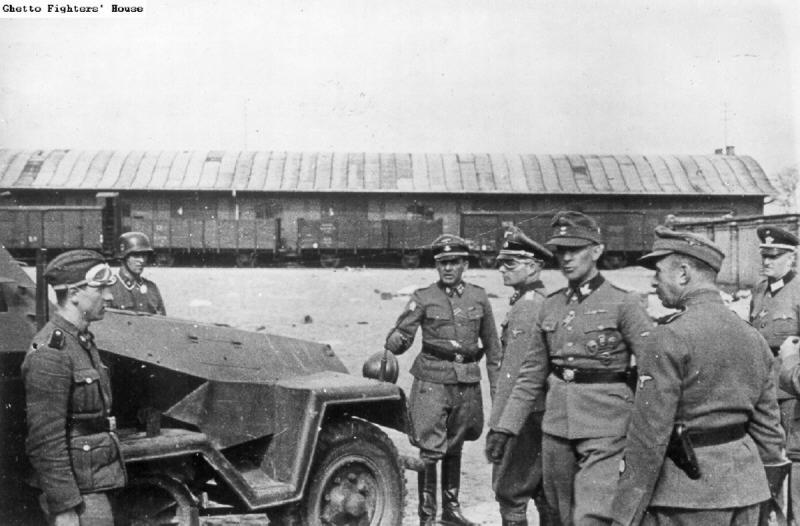
Jürgen Stroop and other officers during Warsaw Ghetto Uprising Depicted place Umschlagplatz

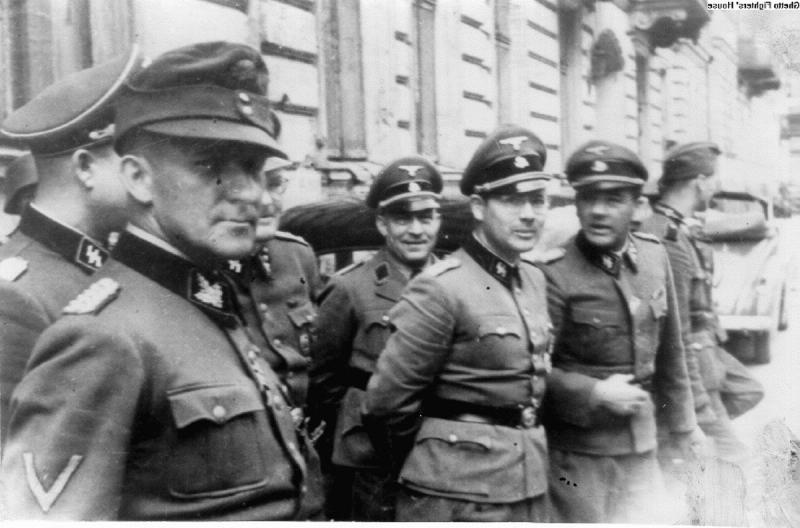
Jürgen Stroop and other officers during Warsaw Ghetto Uprising

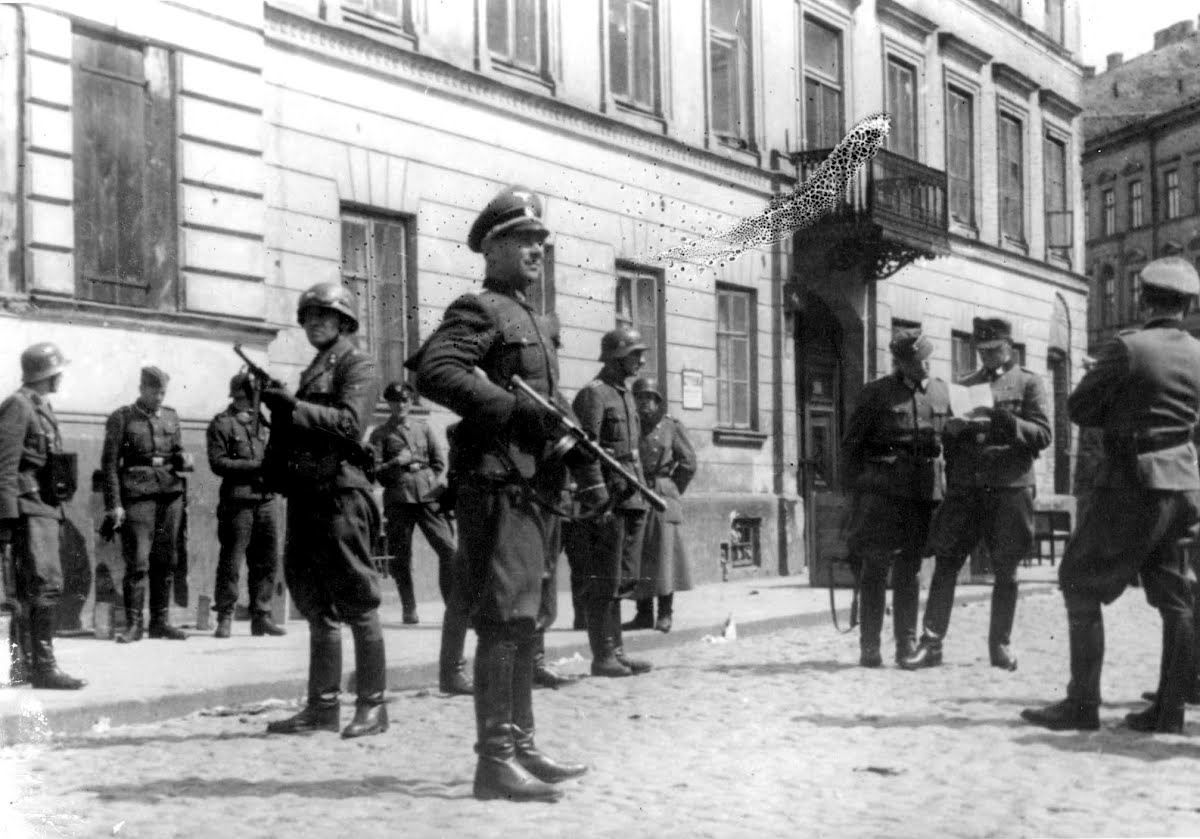
SS and police officers look on as SS Major General Juergen Stroop discusses razing the houses on Niska and Muranowska Streets with Kaleschke, his police adjutant, during Warsaw Ghetto Uprising

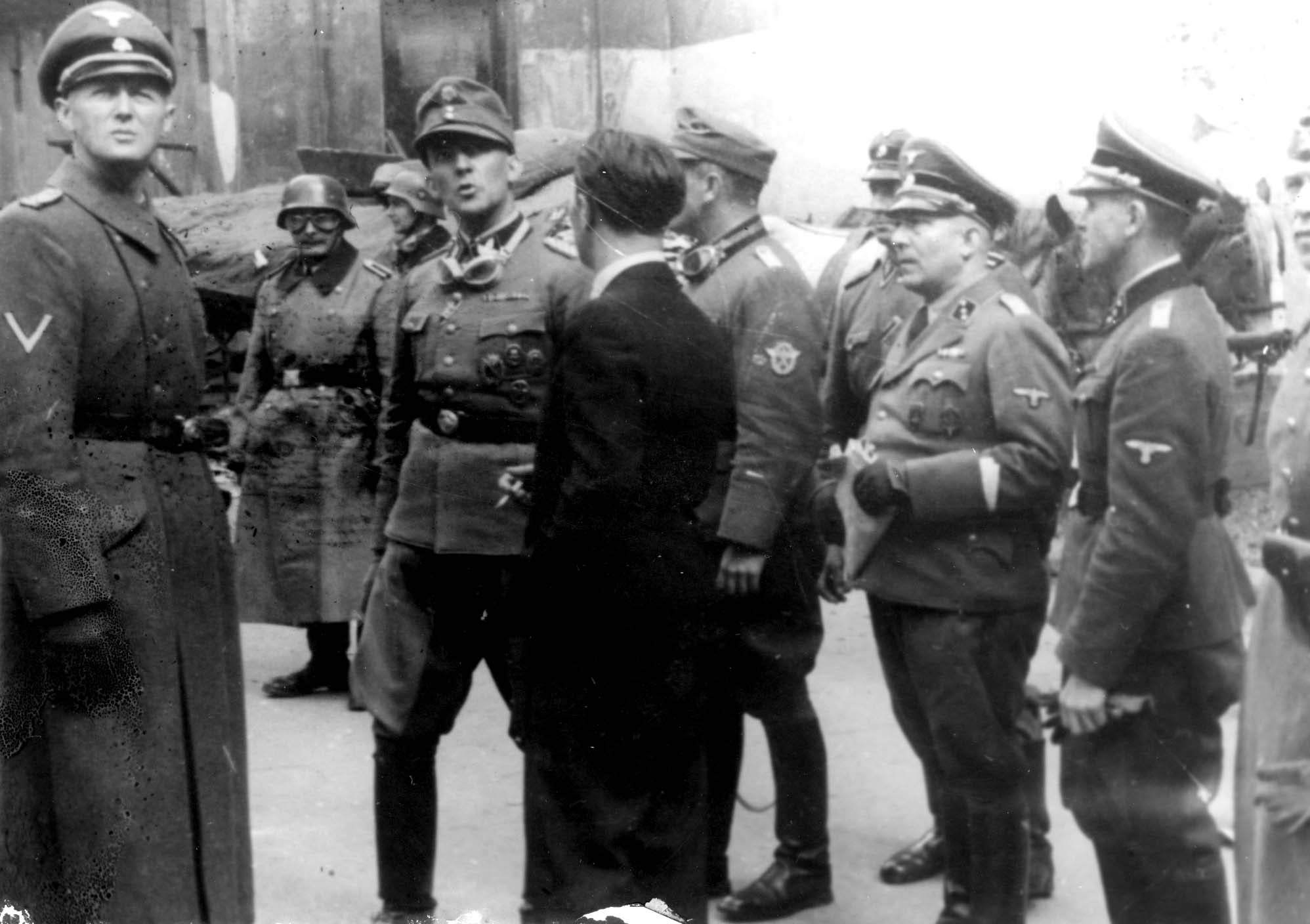
SS Major General Juergen Stroop (second from left) gathers information from a civilian on the second day of the suppression of the Warsaw Ghetto Uprising. Accompanying Stroop are the various officers of his command staff.Left to right SS Fuehrer Franz Konrad (left);Juergen Stroop; Stroop's police adjutant, Karl Kaleske (Kaleschke) (partially hidden);SS Lieutenant (Untersturmfuehrer) Karl Brandt (third from right) SS Lieutenant (Untersturmfuehrer) Schwarz (second from right), and lieutenant (Untersturmfuehrer) in the SD 20 April 1943

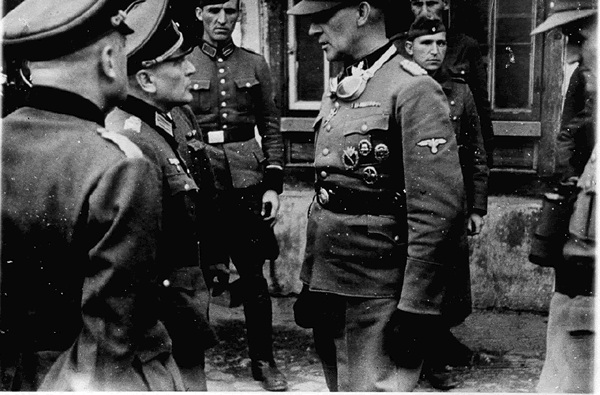
Jürgen Stroop and other officers during Warsaw Ghetto Uprising

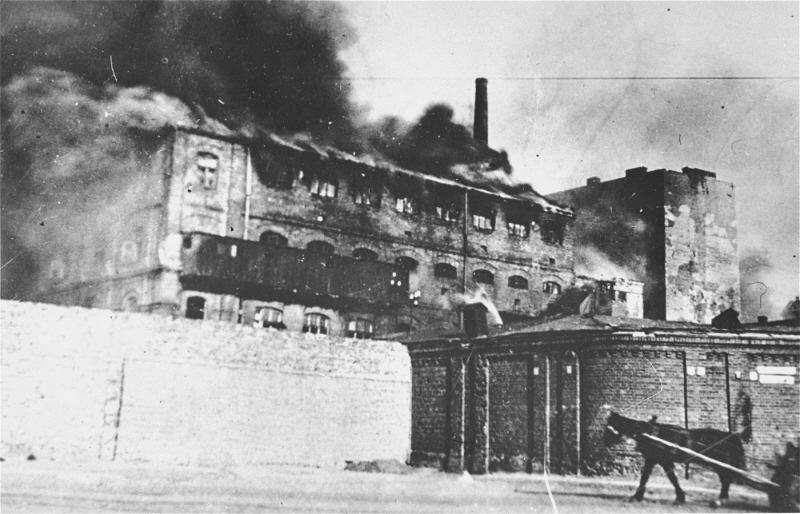
A factory razed by the SS burns during the suppression of the Warsaw ghetto uprising. Note identified by Yad Vashem as view from the Aryan side. Gliniana St. near the cemetery. On the left is Okopowa St. and at the front is the ghetto walls.

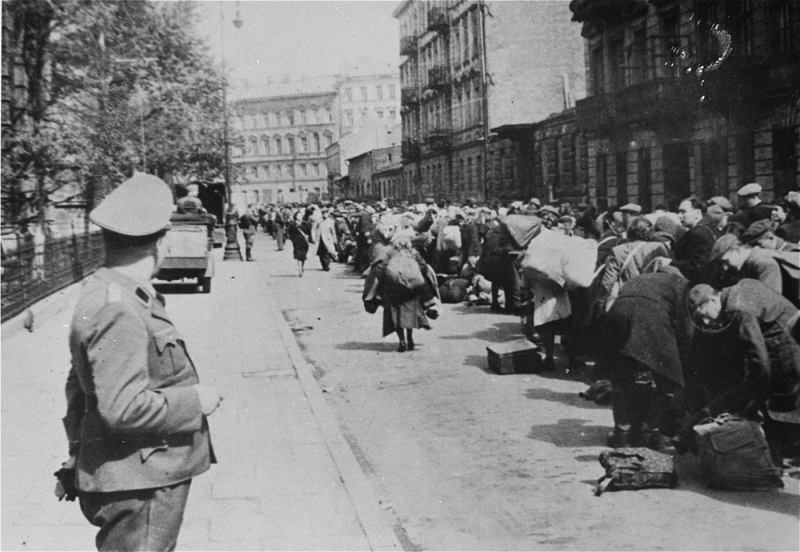
Sicherheitsdienst [SD] (Security Service) Officer Supervises Movement of the Többens’ workshop workers during the Warsaw Ghetto uprising Prosta Street

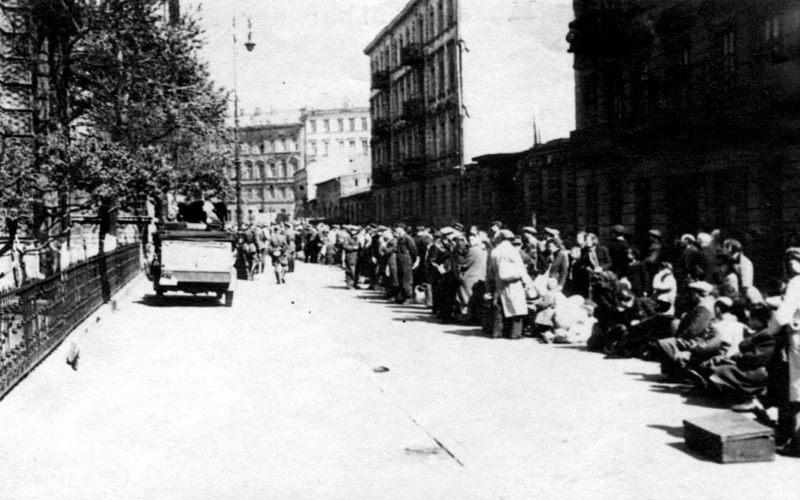
Movement of the Többens’ workshop workers during the Warsaw Ghetto uprising Prosta Street

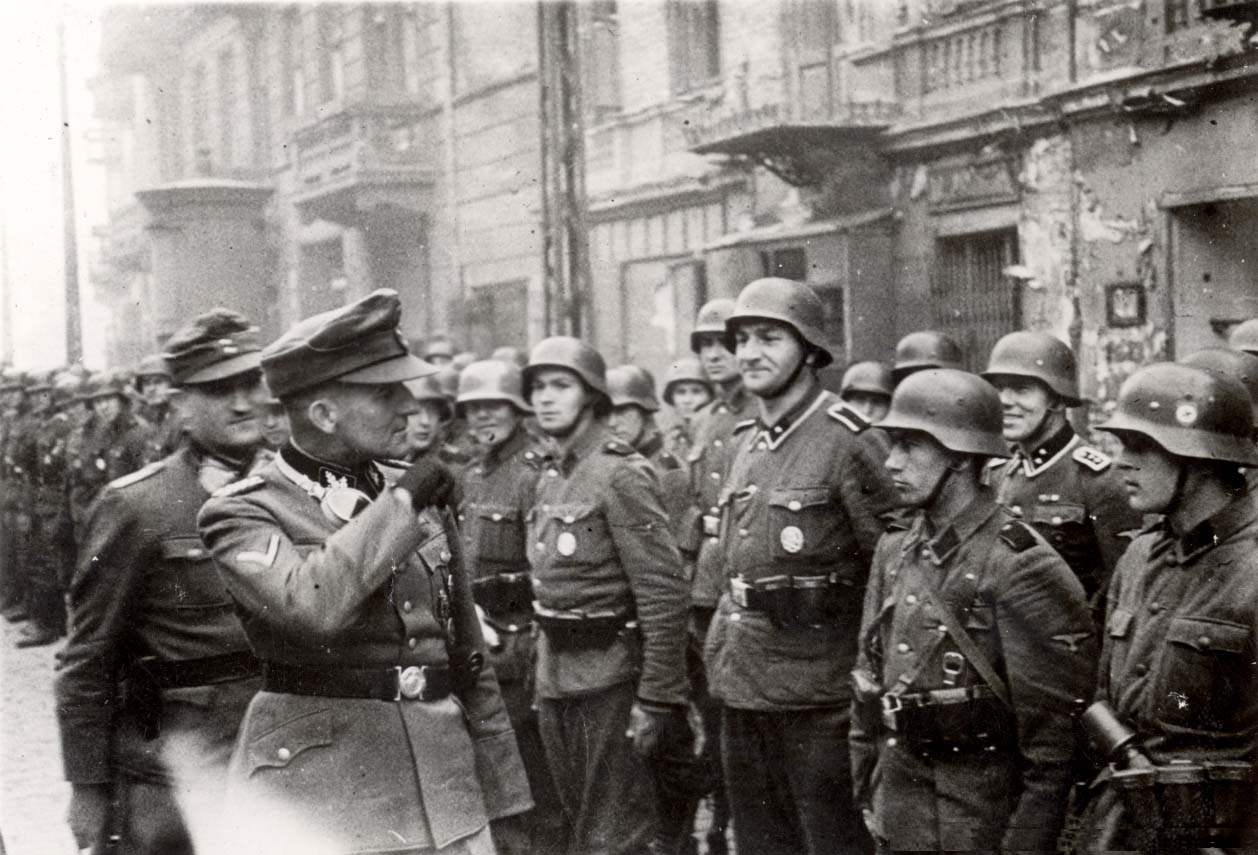
Jürgen Stroop inspecting a parade of SS soldiers during Warsaw Ghetto Uprising Depicted place right to left: Zamenhofa 15, Zamenhofa 13

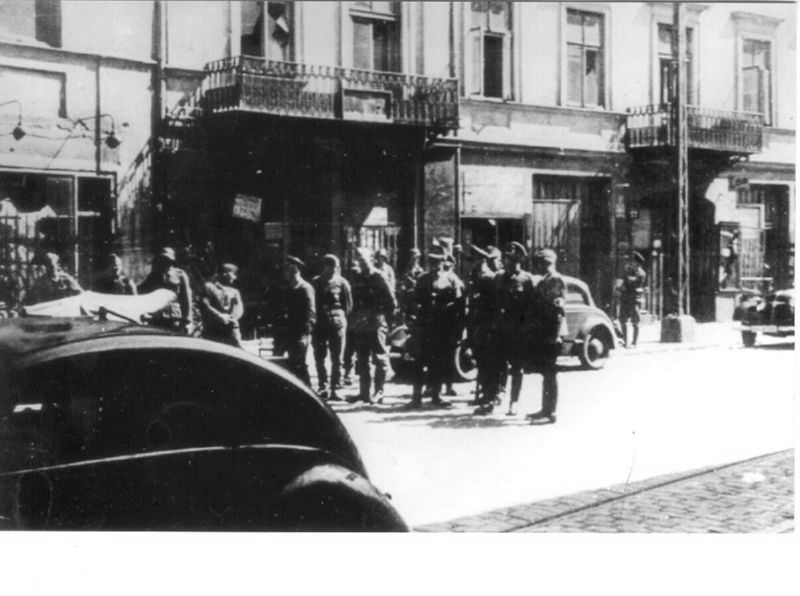
Jürgen Stroop and other officers visits Judenrat during Warsaw Ghetto Uprising left to right: Zamenhofa 24, Zamenhofa 22

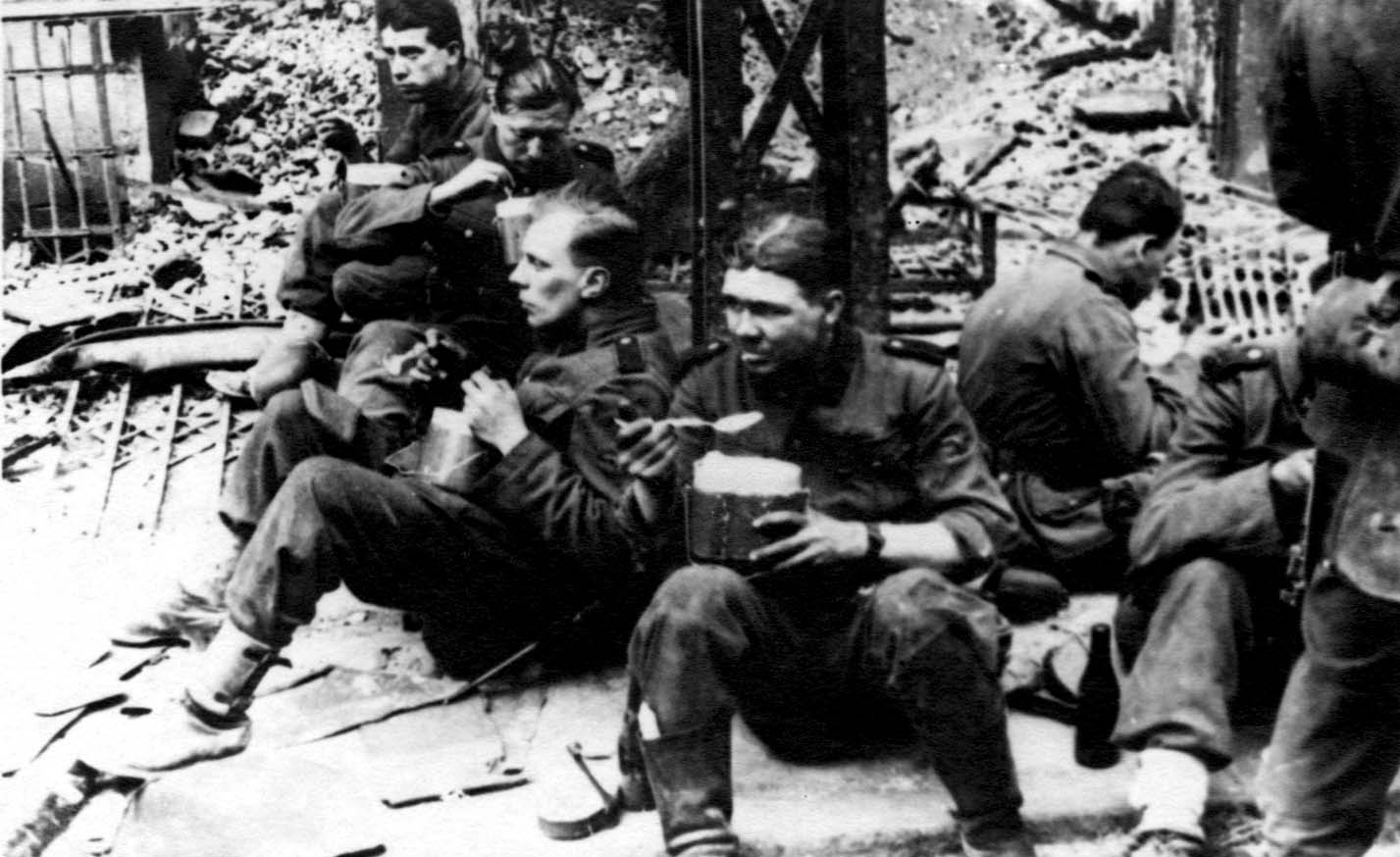
SS soldiers pause to eat during the suppression of the Warsaw ghetto uprising

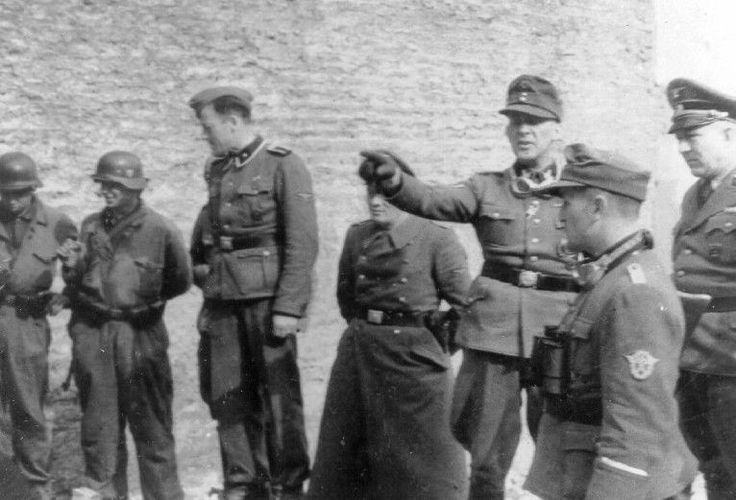
Jürgen Stroop, the senior SS and police officer of the district, escorted by German soldiers and policemen, during Warsaw Ghetto Uprising

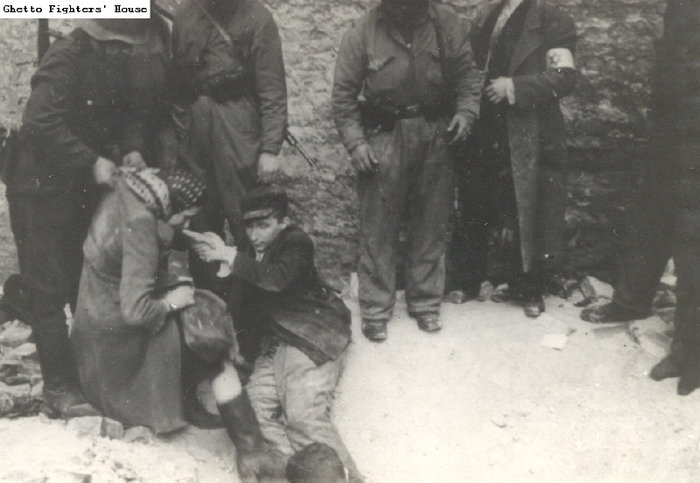
Jews captured from a bunker

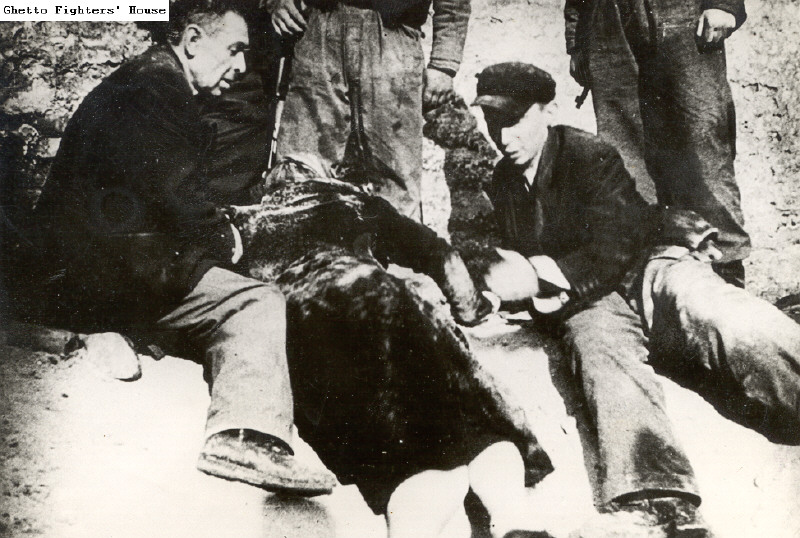
Jews captured from a bunker

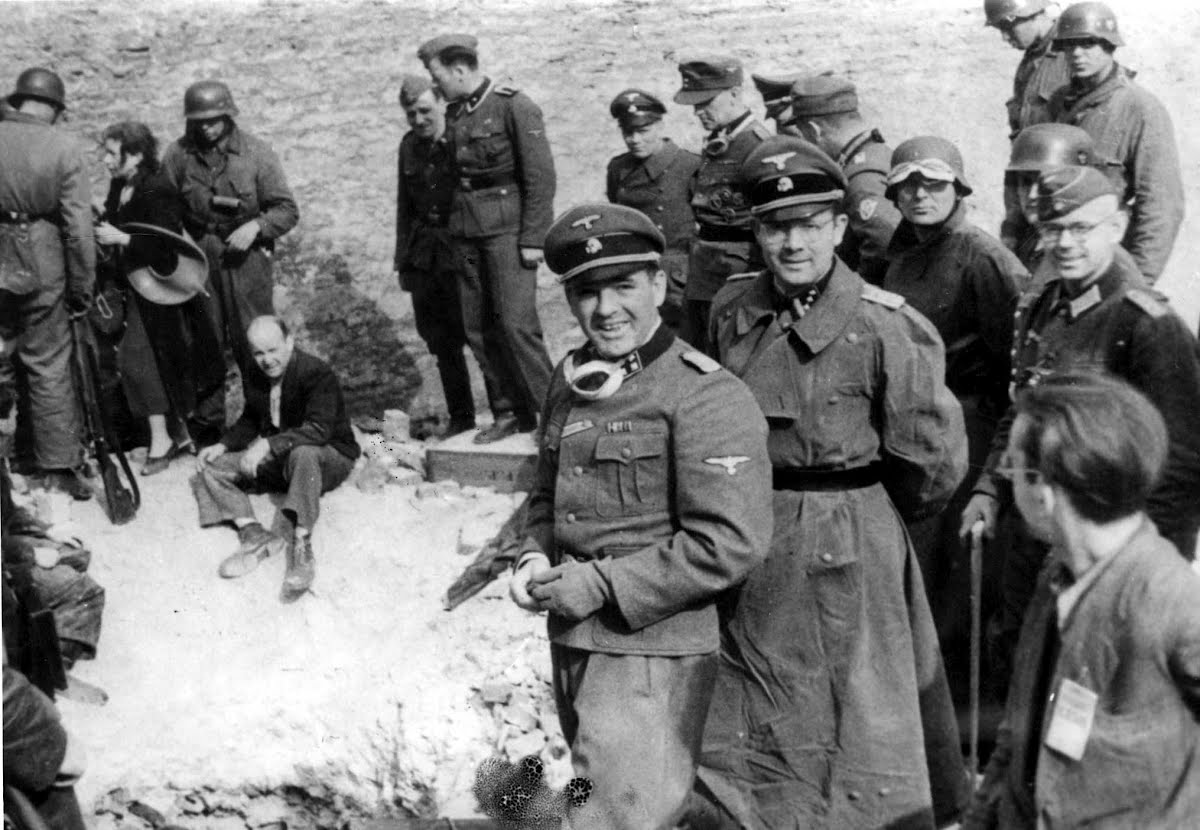
Jürgen Stroop is standing in the background, wearing goggles around his neck.Officer with goggles: SS Obersturmbannführer Walter Bellwidt or Sturmbannfuehrer Max Jesuiter

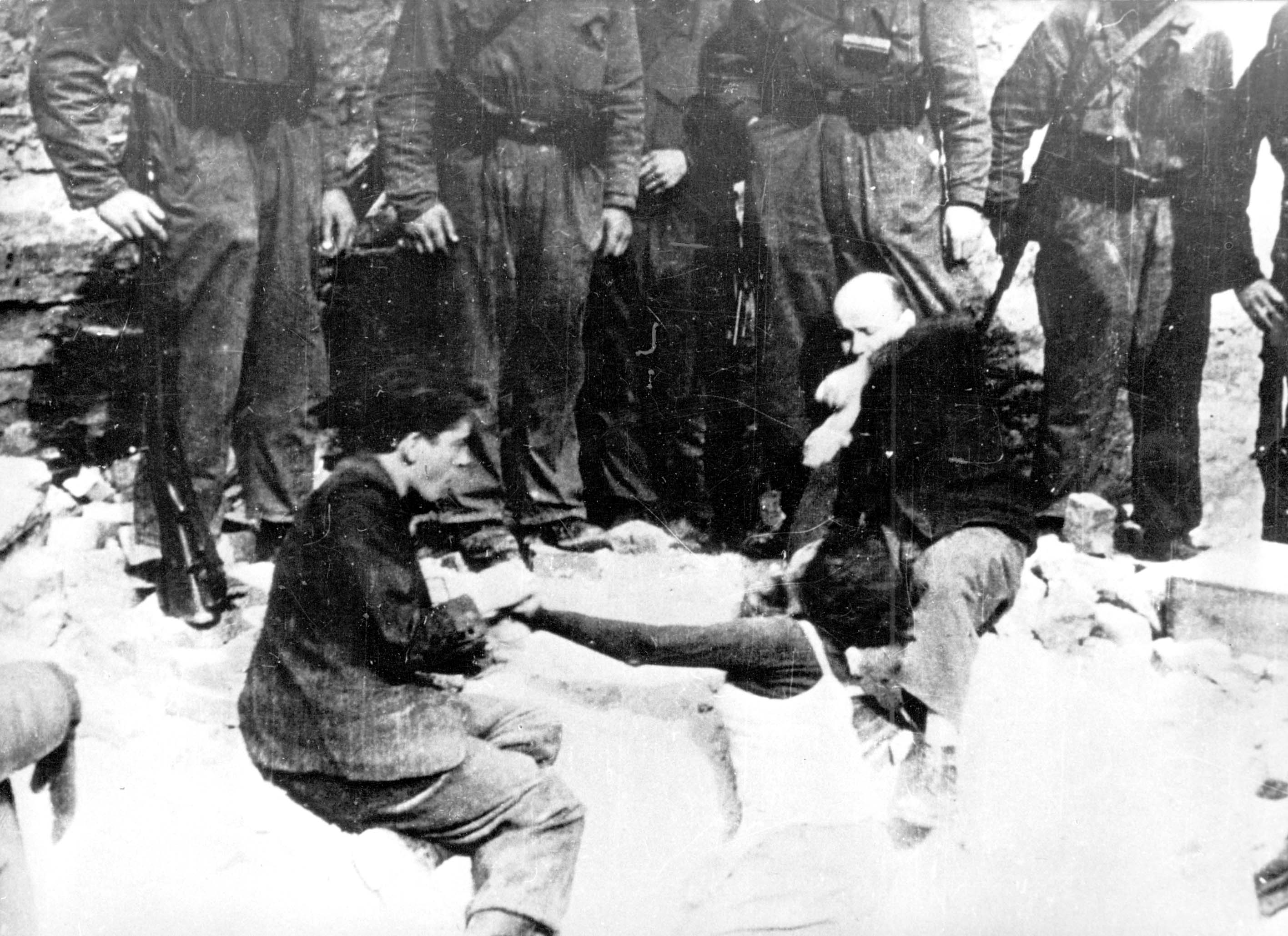
Jews captured from a bunker

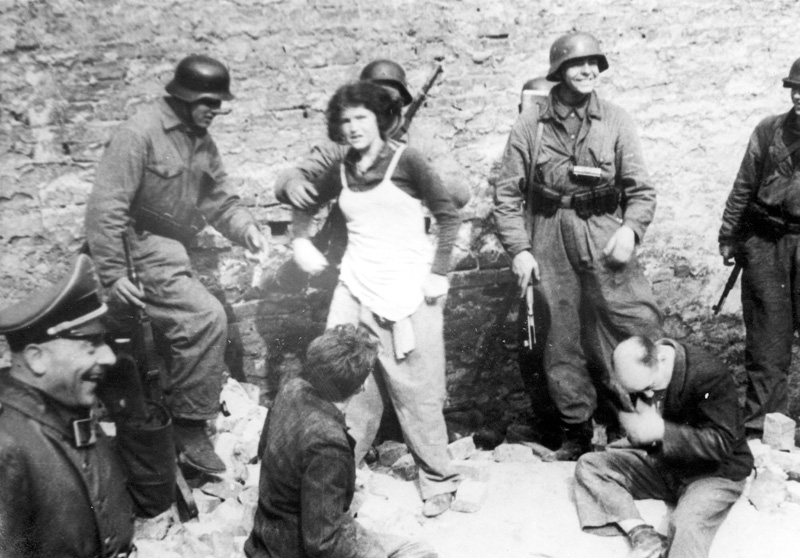
Jews captured from a bunker

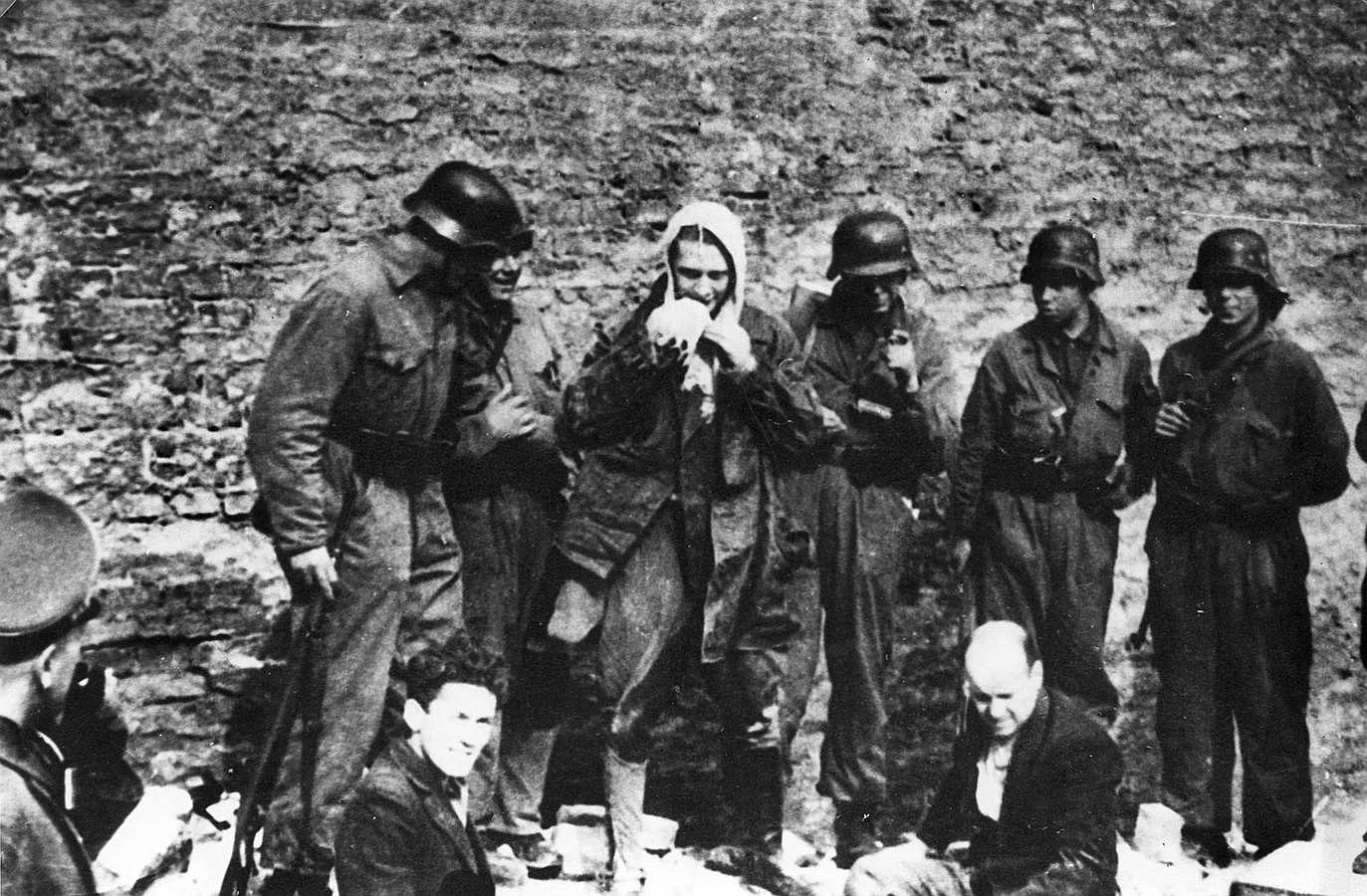
Jews captured from a bunker

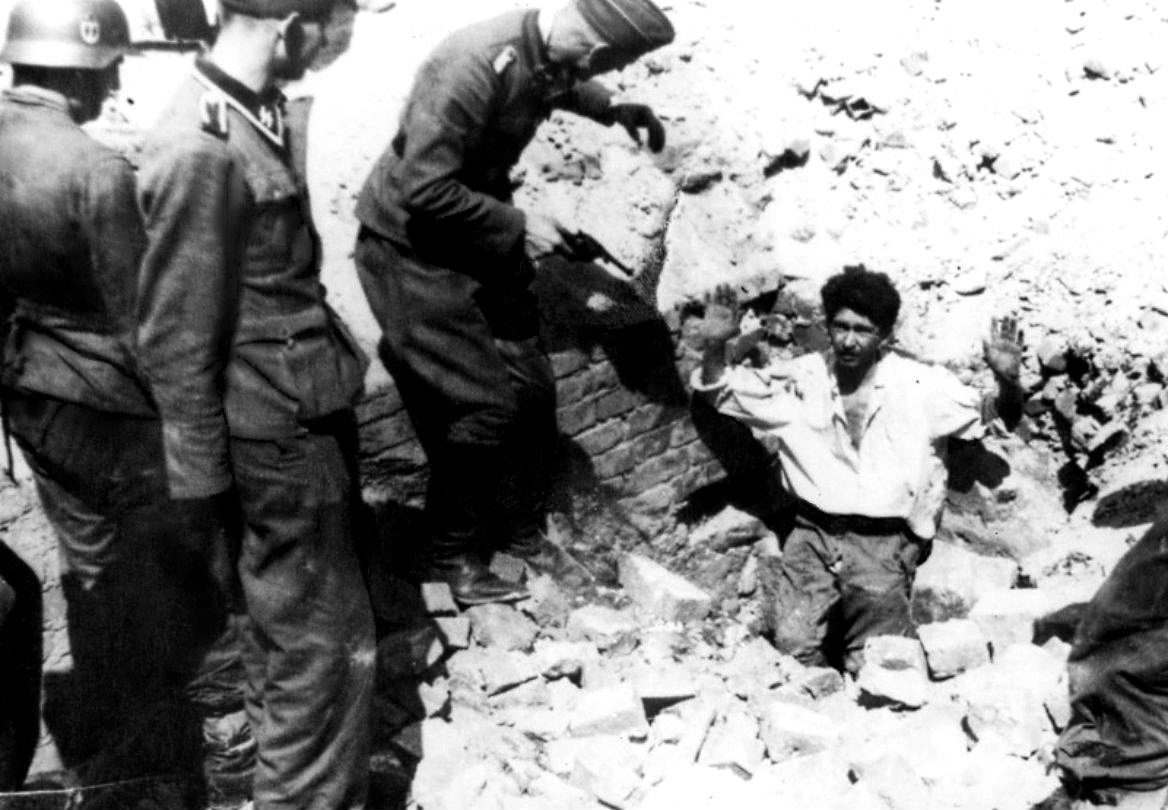
Jew captured 9 May 1943

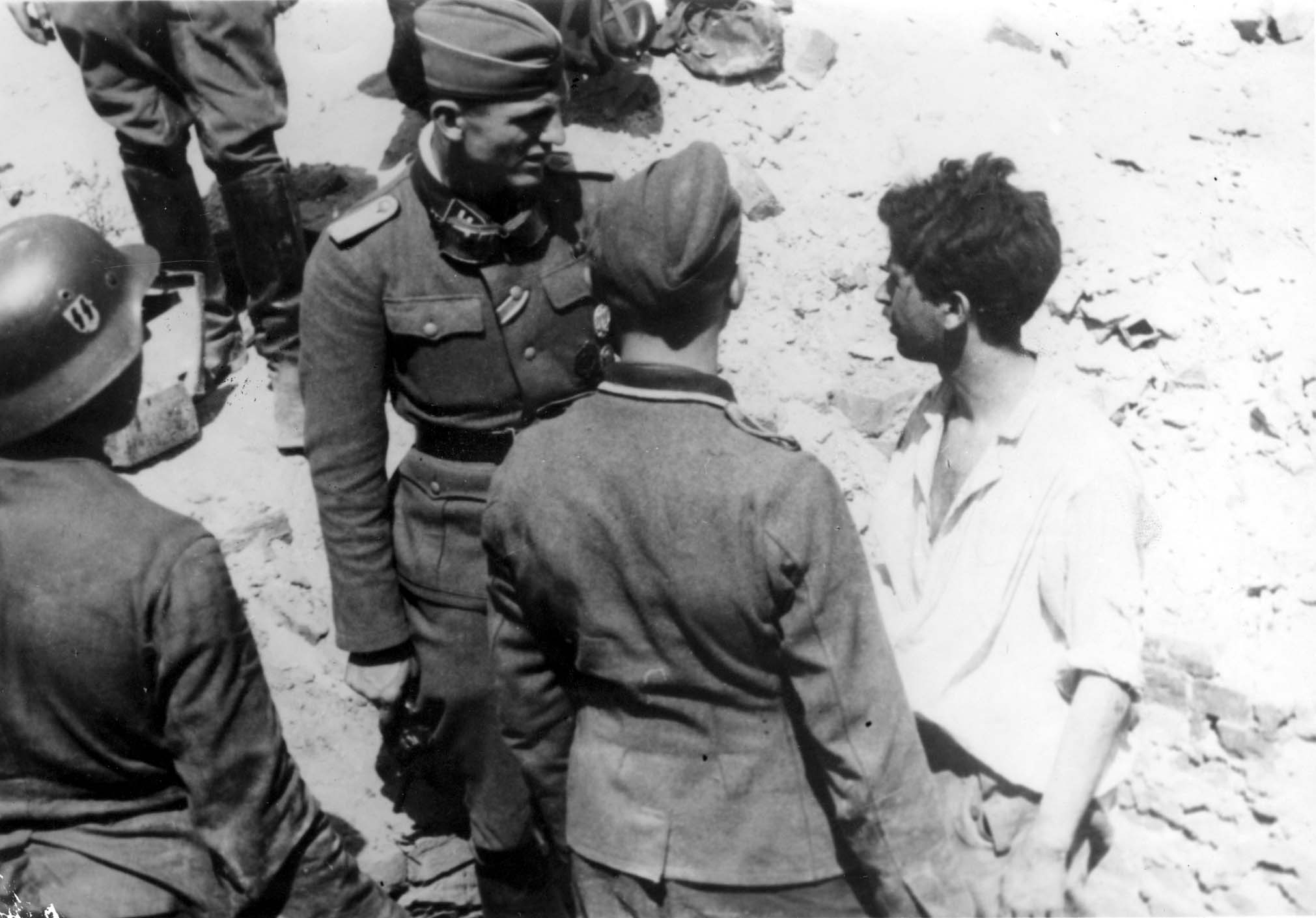
Jew captured 9 May 1943

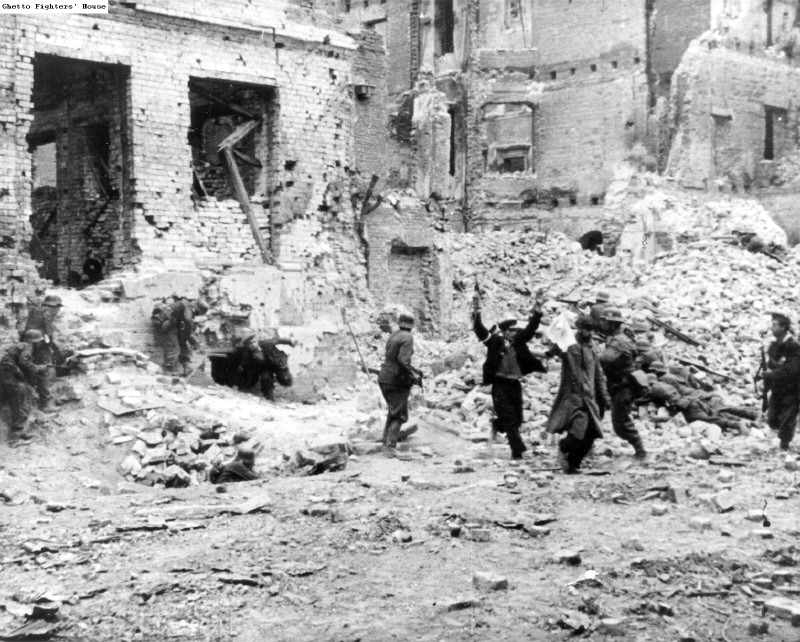
The Jews are being pulled out of the basements by Wehrmacht sappers and SS troops.

== See also ==
- Dachau trials
- Nuremberg trials
