= Levi (given name) =

- Gender: Male

Origin
- Origin: Hebrew
- Meaning: "attached", "joining"

Levi is a masculine given name of Hebrew origin. It is the name of the biblical figure Levi (Hebrew: לֵוִי, Levī), son of Jacob and founder of the Israelite tribe of Levi. The name is derived from the Hebrew verb לוה ("Lava"), meaning "to join" or "connect".

Levi may refer to:

== Biblical figures ==
- Levi, usually identified as Matthew the Apostle, one of the Twelve Apostles of Jesus

== Male people with the name ==
- Levi A. Mackey (1819–1889), American politician, banker, lawyer, and business executive
- Levi Adams (1762–1831), American farmer and politician
- Levi Addison Ault (1851–1930), Canadian-born American businessman and bureaucrat
- Levi Alcon (1921–2013), American politician
- Levi Amantchi (born 2000), English professional footballer
- Levi Anderson (born 1998), Canadian PLL player
- Levi Andoh (born 2000), Dutch semi-professional footballer
- Levi Ankeny (1844–1921), American politician
- Levi Aron (?–2025), American convicted murderer
- Levi Ashcroft (born 2006), Australian AFL player
- Levi Aumua (born 1994), New Zealand rugby union player
- Levi B. Adams, American candidate in California's 21st State Assembly district
- Levi B. French (1845–1923), American politician
- Levi B. Gaylord (1840–1900), American Union Army soldier during the American Civil War
- Levi B. Kaler (1828–1906), American politician and businessman
- Levi B. Nelson (1838–1903), American councilman, mayor, and Union Army soldier during the American Civil War; founder of the Gate City Street Railroad Company
- Levi Bachmeier, American politician
- Levi Baker Vilas (1811–1879), American lawyer, banker, politician, and pioneer
- Levi Barber (1777–1833), American surveyor, court administrator, banker, and politician
- Levi Barnabas (born 1964), Canadian politician
- Levi Beardsley (1785–1857), American lawyer and politician
- Levi Bell (born 1999), American CFL player
- Levi Bellfield (born 1968), British serial killer and sex offender
- Levi ben Abisha ben Phinhas ben Yitzhaq (1920–2001), Samaritan High Priest
- Levi ben Abraham ben Hayyim (c. 1240–1250–1315), French Jewish rabbi and encyclopedist
- Levi ben Gershon, birth name of Gersonides (1288–1344), French Jewish medieval philosopher, Talmudist, mathematician, physician, and astronomer/astrologer
- Levi Benima (1838–1922), Dutch chess master
- Levi ben Japheth (fl. 11th-century), Jewish Karaite rabbi and scholar
- Levi ben Sisi (late 2nd-century–early 3rd-century), Jewish rabbi and scholar
- Levi Benton, American member of metalcore band Miss May I
- Levi Billig (1897–1936), Anglo-Jewish orientalist and scholar of Arabic
- Levi Bodenheimer (1807–1867), German consistorial grand rabbi
- Levi Boone (1808–1882), American politician and mayor
- Levi Borgstrom (1919–2001), Swedish-New Zealand wood carver
- Levi Bouwense (born 2000), Dutch footballer
- Levi Branson Reeder (1865–1930), American attorney and politician
- Levi Brenton Williams (born 1940), Canadian multi-instrumental gospel-, country-, and bluegrass musician
- Levi Brown, several people
- Levi Bryant, American professor of philosophy
- Levi C. Wade (1843–1891), American lawyer, politician, and railroad executive
- Levi Cadogan (born 1995), Barbadian retired sprinter
- Levi Carneiro (1882–1971), Brazilian lawyer, jurist, writer, and judge
- Levi Casboult (born 1990), Australian former AFL player
- Levi Casey, several people
- Levi Celerio (1910–2002), Filipino composer and lyricist
- Levi Chamberlain (1792–1849), American Protestant missionary, penmanship teacher, examiner of Hawaii's native schools, and accountant
- Levi Chavez, American former police officer and attorney at law who was acquitted of murder
- Levi Chibuike Ajuonuma (1959–2012), Nigerian academic, journalist, public relations expert, radio broadcaster, and television presenter
- Levi Clark Bootes (1809–1896), American Union Army soldier during the American Civil War, also serving in the Mexican-American War
- Levi Coffin (1798–1877), American Quaker, politician, educator, abolitionist, farmer, businessman, and humanitarian
- Levi Colbert (c. 1759–1834), American Chickasaw leader
- Levi Coleman (born 1986), American soccer player, head coach, and university assistant
- Levi Collison (1875–1965), English art publisher and printer
- Levi Colwill (born 2003), English professional footballer
- Levi Compton, 19th-century American politician
- Levi Cook (1792–1866), American businessman and politician
- Levi Cooper, Australian-born Israeli Orthodox Jewish teacher, author, and community leader
- Levi Cooper Lane (1828–1902), American physician and surgeon
- Levi Copestake (1886–1968), English professional footballer
- Levi Coppin (1848–1924), American minister, editor, and a founder of the American Negro Academy
- Levi Crocker, American fashion designer and former rodeo performer; contestant on The A-List: Dallas
- Levi Cutter (1774–1856), American businessman, politician, and mayor
- Levi D. Carpenter (1802–1856), American lawyer and politician
- Levi D. Jarrard (1824–1886), American businessman and politician
- Levi D. Slamm (c. 1812–1862), American labor leader, newspaper editor, and politician
- Levi David Addai, English screenwriter and playwright
- Levi Davis, several people
- Levi Day (born 1989), Australian motorcycle racer
- Levi Dean, American politician
- Levi Dexter, British past member of rockabilly revival band Levi and the Rockats
- Levi Díaz (born 2008), Spanish singer
- Lévi Doré (born 2000), Canadian actor
- Levi Douglas (born 1995), English rugby union player
- Levi Drake Rodriguez (born 2000), American NFL player
- Levi Duchman (born 1992/1993), American chief rabbi of the United Arab Emirates
- Levi E. Knapp (1826–1919), American politician
- Levi E. Pond (1833–1895), American farmer and politician
- Levi E. Worden (1849–1928), American builder and politician
- Levi E. Young (1874–1963), American Mormon leader
- Levi Eshkol (1895–1969), Israeli Prime Minister
- Levi F. Martin (1843–1909), American politician
- Levi F. Noble (1882–1965), American geologist
- Levi Faustino (born 2001), Portuguese professional footballer
- Levi Fetters (1831–1893), American politician
- Levi Fisher Ames (1840–1923), American folk artist and woodcarver
- Levi Fontaine (born 1948), American former NBA player
- Levi Fox (1914–2006), English conservationist, historian, and author
- Levi Fragell (born 1939), Norwegian humanist
- Levi Francis (born 2003), English professional footballer
- Levi G. McCauley (1837–1920), American politician
- Levi G. Nutt (1865–1938), American federal law enforcement official
- Levi García (born 1997), Trinidadian professional footballer
- Levi Garraway (born 1968), American oncologist
- Levi General, birth name of Deskaheh (1873–1925), American Iroquois hereditary chief and appointed speaker
- Levi Gibbon (c. 1807–1870), Welsh balladeer
- Levi Goodrich (1822–1887), American architect
- Levi Grant (1810–1891), American farmer, businessman, politician, and pioneer
- Levi Greenwood (born 1989), Australian retired AFL player
- Levi Guerra, American candidate in the Faithless electors in the 2016 United States presidential election
- Levi H. Bancroft (1861–1948), American teacher, lawyer, and politician
- Levi H. Dowling (1844–1911), American preacher and Union Army soldier during the American Civil War
- Levi H. Greenwood (1872–1930), American businessman and politician
- Levi Haʻalelea (c. 1822–1864), Native Hawaiian nobility and politician
- Levi Haile (1797–1854), American lawyer, politician, and Supreme Court justice
- Levi Haines (born 2004), American freestyle- and folkstyle wrestler
- Levi Hanssen (born 1988), New Zealand-born Faroese former professional footballer
- Levi Harper (born 2008), American ice hockey player
- Levi Harrington (?–1882), African American man who was lynched
- Levi Hawken (born 1975), New Zealand sculptor, graffiti artist, and skateboarder
- Levi Hedge (1766–1844), American educator and professor
- Levi Heimans (born 1985), Dutch track cyclist
- Levi Henriksen (born 1964), Norwegian novelist, short story writer, and singer-songwriter
- Levi Herzfeld (1810–1884), German Jewish rabbi and historian
- Levi Higginson (1867–?), English footballer
- Levi Hill (1816–1865), American minister who claimed to have invented a color photographic process
- Levi Hill (trade unionist) (1883–1961), British local government officer
- Levi Holloway, American playwright, actor, and educator
- Levi Horn (born 1986), American former professional football player
- Levi Houapeu (born 1989), Ivorian footballer
- Levi Hubbard (1762–1836), American politician and farmer
- Levi Hubbell (1808–1876), American lawyer, judge, and politician
- Levi Hummon, American country musician
- Levi Hutchins (1761–1855), American clockmaker, and self-proclaimed inventor of the first American alarm clock
- Levi ibn al-Tabban, 12th-century Spanish Jewish poet, grammarian, and non-fiction writer
- Levi ibn Habib (c. 1480–c. 1545), Israeli chief rabbi
- Levi II, 3rd-century Jewish rabbi and scholar
- Levi Isaacs (c. 1860–1913), Australian tobacconist and Jewish leader
- Levi Ives (footballer) (born 1997), Northern Irish footballer
- Levi J. Dean (1878–1951), American architect
- Levi J. Gunn (1830–1916), American tool manufacturer and politician
- Levi J. Ham (1805–1887), American politician and surgeon
- Levi J. Rowan (1871–1934), American academic administrator, college president, teacher, and photographer
- Levi Jackson (1926–2000), American college football player and business executive
- Levi Jensen (born 1967), Norwegian Pentecostal evangelist and YouTuber
- Levi Jerahmeel Klaczko (1840–?), Russian Jewish educator and author
- Levi Jern (1893–1973), Finnish farmer and politician
- Levi Johnson (born 1950), American former NFL player
- Levi Johnston (born 1990), American model, actor, and politician
- Levi Jones (born 1979), American former NFL player
- Levi Jordan (born 1995), American MLB player
- Levi K. Fuller (1841–1896), American businessman, military officer, and politician
- Levi Karuhanga (1956–2016), Ugandan major general
- Levi Kelly (born 1999), American former MLB player
- Levi Kereama (1981–2008), Australian contestant on Australian Idol season 1
- Levi Kitchen (born 2001), American professional Motocross- and Supercross racer
- Levi Kreis (born 1981), American actor and singer-songwriter
- Levi L. Conant (1857–1916), American mathematician
- Levi L. Lamborn (1829–1910), American medical doctor, horticulturalist, and politician
- Levi L. Rowland (1831–1908), American educator and physician
- Levi Laing (born 2003), English professional footballer
- Levi Landis (born 1982), American arts administrator, musician, manager, and festival producer
- Levi Lapper Morse (1853–1913), English grocer, draper, and politician
- Levi LaVallee (born 1982), American snowmobile racer
- Levi Leipheimer (born 1973), American former professional road racing cyclist
- Levi Leiter (1834–1904), American businessman
- Levi Lewis (disambiguation), several people
- Levi Lincoln, several people
- Levi Lovering (1776–1857), American drummer and early rudimental drum manual author
- Levi Lovett (1854–1929), British trade unionist and coal miner
- Levi Lowrey, American singer-songwriter
- Levi Lumeka (born 1998), English professional footballer
- Levi M. Hubbell (1826–1910), American businessman and politician
- Levi Mackin (born 1986), English former professional footballer
- Levi Maish (1837–1899), American politician
- Levi Malungu (born 2002), Belgian professional footballer
- Levi Manning (1864–1935), American hotelier, businessman, and mayor
- Levi March (1841–1933), Canadian politician and magistrate
- Levi Marengo (born 1987), Dutch professional footballer
- Levi Marhabi (born c. 1987), Yemenite Orthodox Jew; the last known Jew living in Yemen
- Levi Marston (1816–1904), American sea captain
- Levi Mayihlome (born 1953), Zimbabwean politician
- Levi McKeen Arnold (1813–1864), American businessman and banker
- Levi Meaden (born c. 1987), Canadian actor
- Levi Meyerle (1849–1921), American MLB player
- Levi Michael (born 1991), American former professional baseball player
- Levi Miller (born 2002), Australian actor and model
- Levi Miller (Virginia soldier) (1836–1921), American preacher, farmer, and Confederate Army soldier during the American Civil War
- Levi Myers (1767–1822), American Jewish physician
- Levi Najara, Spanish rabbi who emigrated to Mamluk Palestine in 1492
- Levi Newcomb (1822–1898), American architect
- Levi Newton Breed (1831–1908), American businessman and politician
- Levi Nyagura, Zimbabwean academic
- Levi Oakes (1925–2019), Canadian-born American Mohawk code talker and army soldier during World War II
- Levi Obery, American film producer; founder and president of film company Ten Thirty-One Pictures Entertainment
- Levi Olan (1903–1984), Ukrainian-born American Reform Jewish rabbi, social activist, author, and professor
- Levi Onwuzurike (born 1998), American NFL player
- Levi Opdam (born 1996), Dutch professional footballer
- Levi P. Morton (1824–1920), American politician
- Levi P. Powers (1828–1888), American politician and lawyer
- Levi Parham, American singer-songwriter
- Levi Parker Webster (1883–1962), American athlete, professional runner, and ultramarathoner
- Levi Parsons, American judge
- Levi Parsons Gillette (1832–1903), American farmer and politician
- Levi Pawling (1773–1845), American politician
- Levi Pinfold, British artist, writer, and illustrator
- Levi Ponce, American painter
- Levi Porter (born 1987), English footballer
- Levi Prizer (1819–1875), American politician
- Levi Psavkin (born 1939), Israeli former Olympic runner
- Levi R. Chase (1917–1994), American fighter pilot and double flying ace during World War II
- Levi R. Kelley (1899–1967), American political figure
- Levi R. Mearns (1820s–1896), American politician
- Levi Rackliffe (c. 1843–1898), American politician
- Levi Rahmani (1919–2013), Israeli archeologist and curator
- Levi Randolph (born 1992), American professional basketball player
- Levi Redfern (1905–1976), English footballer
- Levi Reed (1814–1869), American politician
- Levi Reid (born 1983), English footballer
- Levi Richard Ellert (1857–1901), American politician
- Levi Richards (1799–1876), American Mormon leader and missionary
- Levi Rigters (born 1995), Dutch kickboxer
- Levi Risamasu (born 1982), Dutch former footballer
- Levi Roach (born 1985), British-Canadian academic, medievalist, and historian
- Levi Robin (born 1992), American Hasidic folk singer
- Levi Rolla Cooper, birth name of Tucker (American wrestler) (born 1990), American retired professional wrestler
- Levi Romero, several people
- Levi Roots (born 1958), Jamaican-British businessman, chef, musician, television personality, author, and radio presenter; creator of the brand Reggae Reggae Sauce
- Levi Ruggles (1824–1889), American soldier, carpenter, schoolteacher, pioneer, and politician
- Levi Ruggles Church (1836–1892), Canadian doctor, lawyer, judge, and political figure
- Levi S. Backus (1803–1869), American first deaf newspaper editor
- Levi S. Chatfield (1808–1884), American lawyer and politician
- Levi S. Gould (1831–1917), American businessman and politician
- Levi S. Peterson (born 1933), American Mormon biographer, essayist, and fictionist
- Levi Sanders, American candidate in the 2018 United States House of Representatives elections in New Hampshire; son of politician and activist Bernie Sanders
- Levi Savage Jr. (1820–1910), American Mormon missionary to Asia; pioneer in the Willie Handcart Company
- Levi Schoppema (born 2004), Dutch professional footballer
- Levi Schwiebbe (born 1986), Dutch retired footballer
- Levi Scofield (1842–1917), American architect and sculptor; Union Army captain during the American Civil War
- Levi Scott, several people
- Levi Seacer Jr. (born 1961), American musician
- Levi Shemtov, American Jewish rabbi
- Levi Sherwood (born 1991), New Zealand retired freestyle motocross rider
- Levi Silliman Ives (1797–1867), American Protestant bishop turned Roman Catholic theologian
- Levi Smans (born 2003), Dutch professional footballer
- Levi Smith (disambiguation), several people
- Levi Spaulding (1791–1873), American Protestant missionary in Sri Lanka
- Levi Stanley (1818?–1908), English-born American member of the Romani Stanley family
- Levi Steinhauer (born 1991), Canadian former CFL player
- Levi Stephen (born 1974), Scottish former professional- and semi-professional footballer
- Levi Sterling (1804–1868), American farmer, politician, and pioneer; Union Army cavalry officer during the American Civil War
- Levi Sternberg (1894–1976), American-Canadian fossil collector and paleontologist
- Levi Stewart Udall (1891–1960), American lawyer and Supreme Court chief justice
- Levi Stockbridge (1820–1904), American farmer and scientist
- Levi Stoudt (born 1997), American MLB pitcher
- Levi Strauss (1829–1902), German-born Jewish American inventor of blue jeans
- Levi Stubbs (1936–2008), American baritone singer; past member of vocal group the Four Tops
- Levi Sutton (born 1997), English professional footballer
- Levi Suydam (born 1819/1820), American property-holding intersex man
- Levi T. Griffin (1837–1906), American politician and Union Army officer during the American Civil War
- Levi Tafari, English poet and performer
- Levi the Poet (born 1989), American spoken word artist
- Levi Thomson (1855–1938), Canadian farmer, lawyer, and political figure
- Levi Tillemann (born 1981/1982), American businessman, academic, and author
- Levi Todd (1756–1807), American pioneer and businessman
- Levi Twiggs (1793–1847), American Marine Corps officer during the War of 1812
- Levi Underwood (1821–1902), American lawyer and politician
- Levi van Veluw (born 1985), Dutch contemporary artist
- Levi Vega Martinez (1927–2002), Costa Rican journalist
- Levi Vloet (born 1996), Dutch Paralympic sprinter
- Levi W. Barden (1820–1915), American lawyer and politician
- Levi W. Hancock (1803–1882), American Mormon missionary
- Levi Wallace (born 1995), American professional football player
- Levi Wallace (politician) (1839–1917), American politician
- Levi Walter Mengel (1868–1941), American entomologist
- Levi Warner (1831–1911), American politician
- Levi Watkins (1944–2015), American heart surgeon and civil rights activist
- Levi Weaver, American independent musician, singer, songwriter, performer, and sportswriter
- Levi Weeks (1776–1819), American carpenter; accused in the infamous Manhattan Well Murder trial of 1800
- Levi Wells (1734–1803), American politician, and officer in the French and Indian War and the American Revolution
- Levi Wells (born 2001), American MLB pitcher
- Levi Wells Prentice (1851–1935), American still life- and landscape painter
- Levi Wentz (born 2002), American football player
- Levi Wijk, real name of Bunt (DJ) (born 1996), German electronic-folk DJ and record producer
- Levi William Humphrey (1881–1947), American-born Canadian politician and locomotive engineer
- Levi Williams (1794–1860), American Baptist minister and militia officer
- Levi Williams (American football), American former college football player
- Levi Withee (1834–1910), American lumberman, businessman, and pioneer
- Levi Withee Gibson (1872–1919), American businessman and politician
- Levi Woodbury (1789–1851), American politician, attorney, jurist, and Supreme Court associate justice
- Levi Wright (1862–1953), English footballer and cricketer
- Levi Yale (1792–1872), American politician, abolitionist, and Underground Railroad agent
- Levi Yates (1891–1934), English footballer
- Levi Ying (1949–2013), Taiwanese politician and legal scholar
- Levi Yissar, Israeli engineer and entrepreneur
- Levi Yitzchak Horowitz (1921–2009), American-born Hasidic rabbi
- Levi Yitzchak Schneerson (1878–1944), Russian Chabad-Lubavitch Hasidic rabbi
- Levi Yitzchok Bender (1897–1989), Polish-born Jewish rabbi
- Levi Yitzchok of Berditchev (1740–1809), Ukrainian Jewish rabbi and Hasidic master
- Levi Youster (born 1992), American former professional stock car racing driver
- Levi Zeilinwarger (1932–?), Polish possible Warsaw Ghetto boy
- Levi Zililo Mumba (?–1945), Malawian politician

== Female people with the name ==
- Levi Ruivivar (born 2006), Filipino-American artistic gymnast
- Levi Sap Nei Thang, Burmese-born American perfume entrepreneur, businesswoman, and philanthropist

== Fictional characters ==
- Levi Ackerman, in the Japanese manga series Attack on Titan
- Levi Bar Alvaeus, also known as "Biff." Main character of Lamb: The Gospel According to Biff, Christ's Childhood Pal by Christopher Moore (author)
- Levi Canning, in the Australian TV soap opera Neighbours, played by Richie Morris
- Levi Dunkleman, in the US daytime TV soap opera General Hospital, played by Zachary Garred
- Levi Fowler, in the Australian TV soap opera Home and Away, played by Tristan Gorey
- Levi Norast, in the 1951 US science fiction novel Foundation
- Levi Rochester, in the UK soap opera Hollyoaks, played by Cerith Flinn
- Levi Schmitt, in the US medical drama TV series Grey's Anatomy, played by Jake Borelli
- Levi the Slasher, in the Japanese multimedia franchise Magical Girl Lyrical Nanoha, voiced by Nana Mizuki (Japanese) and Jennifer Alyx (English)

== See also ==
- Levy (disambiguation), includes list of people with the given name
- Levi (surname)
- Levy (surname)
