= Levi Cooper =

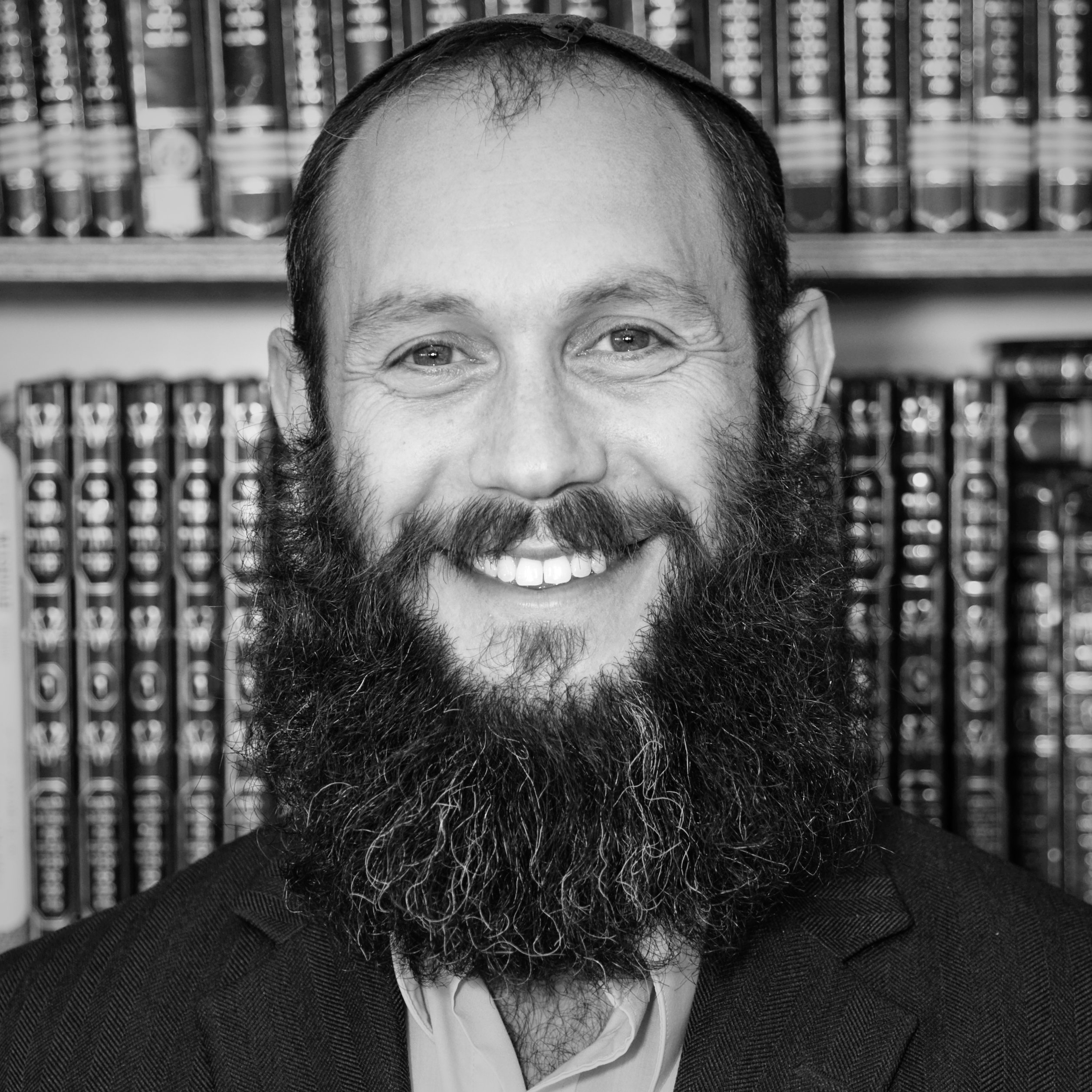
Cooper in 2009

Levi Cooper (Hebrew: לוי קופר; also known as The Maggid of Melbourne) is an Orthodox Jewish teacher, author, and community leader who lives in Tzur Hadassah, Israel. He is a faculty member of the Pardes Institute for Jewish Studies in Jerusalem, where he teaches Midrash, Talmud, Rambam, and Hasidism. Originally from Australia, Cooper lectures extensively on the topics of law and Halakha, Jewish spirituality and Hasidic thought. Since 1996, he has also served as a historian with Heritage Seminars. He has studied at Chabad, Yeshivat Sha'alvim, the Kollel at Bar-Ilan University and Beit Morasha.

He has been a post-doctoral fellow in Bar-Ilan University's Faculty of Law and Inter-University Academic Partnership in Russian and Eastern European Studies. Cooper established the synagogue HaTzur VeHaTzohar Congregation in the Jerusalem suburb, Tzur Hadassah.

== Works ==
Cooper has a monthly column on Hasidism called The Tisch, which appears in The Jerusalem Post. In March 2019, the column name was changed to Maggid of Melbourne.

He has presented research papers for the Van Leer Jerusalem Institute, Bar-Ilan University, the Foundation for Jewish Studies, the World Congress of Jewish Studies, and has published in journals such as the Cambridge Journal of Law and Religion and the Jewish Political Studies Review.

His first book, Relics for the Present was published by Koren Publishers Jerusalem in June 2012. A second volume followed in 2016.

He has had a podcast series since 2015.

In 2020, Cooper was awarded the prize for the best legal history article by the Israeli History and Law Association, for his article "Jewish Law in the Beit Midrash of Hasidism" in which he argued that scholars have largely ignored the legal writings of Hasidism.

During the COVID-19 pandemic, Cooper wrote studies focusing on Jewish historical responses to pandemics, as well as pieces exploring contemporary religious responses to the pandemic.

He has been awarded post-doctoral research grants from Bar-Ilan University, Tel Aviv University, The Inter-University Academic Partnership in Russian and Eastern European Studies, Ben-Gurion University of the Negev, and the Jewish Galicia and Bukovina Organization at University of Haifa. In 2016, Levi was an Academic Visitor at University of Oxford’s Faculty of Law and St. Hugh's College. In 2022, Levi was an Academic Visitor at the Max Planck Institute for Legal History and Legal Theory in Frankfurt.

== Bibliography ==
- Relics for the Present II: Contemporary Reflections on the Talmud Berakhot II. Koren, 2016. ISBN 9781592644421.
- Relics for the Present: Contemporary Reflections on the Talmud Berakhot I. Koren, 2012. ISBN 9781592643608.
- The Mizhinik and the Mizhinke, second edition Jerusalem 2013 [Hebrew and English].
- Berakhot Ya‘ateh Moreh: Timepieces in Hasidic Lore Zur Hadassa: Devarim Meiheksheram Publishing, 2010 [Hebrew].
- Mizhinke Jerusalem 2006 [Hebrew and English].
- Royal Connections: Hasidic Masters from the House of Ruzhin-Boyan and Hasidic Masters from the House of Habad Jerusalem, 2004 [Hebrew/Yiddish].
- Heritage Haggadah Companion: Selections for the Seder Table Dedicated to the Memory of Polish Jewry co-authored with Dr. David I. Bernstein, Jerusalem 1999.
