= Senator French =

Senator French may refer to:

- Edward L. French (1860–1947), Washington State Senate
- Ezra B. French (1810–1880), Maine State Senate
- Harold F. French (fl. 2010s), New Hampshire State Senate
- Hollis French (born 1958), Alaska State Senate
- James M. French (1834–1916), Virginia State Senate
- Jonas H. French (1829–1903), Massachusetts State Senate
- Levi B. French (1845–1923), South Dakota State Senate
- Steve French (politician) (born 1962), Alabama State Senate
- Tim French (fl. 2020s), Wyoming State Senate
- Timmy French (born 1969), Virginia State Senate
