= Archie Johnson Inger =

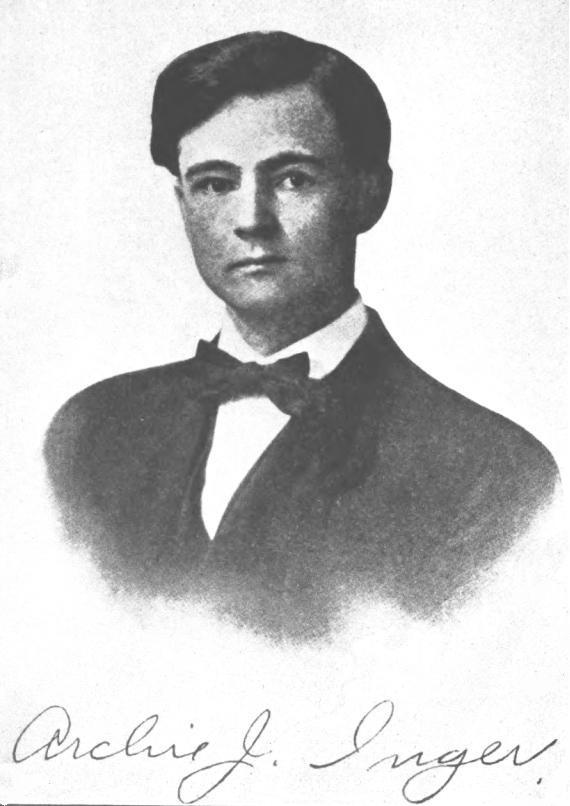
Archie J. Inger at around the age of 27; photo was published as the frontispiece of Albert Van der Naillen's 1912 The Submissive Life, a book written about Inger.

Archie Johnson Inger (Archie J. Inger) (June 17, 1883 in Preston, Idaho – October 3, 1954 in Hayward, California) was an artist, author and Christian lecturer whose experiences and claims call to mind those of Maurice L. Glendenning. Both individuals were born into non-Mormon or inactive Mormon families, but both confided in their parents while young boys that they had begun to hear 'heavenly' music or voices while wide awake. Partly because such claims were similar to those of Mormonism's founder Joseph Smith, Jr., both individuals later became associated with Mormonism in their adult years.

For example, a news brief in the July 6, 1944 edition of the Hayward Review newspaper reported "A painting by Archie Inger will be presented by him to the Hayward ward of the Latter Day Saints church during a special program to be held at the Masonic hall on Sunday evening at 7 pm, Bishop W.T. Webb has announced..."

While Inger produced a number of writings and paintings in his career, he is best known as author of Revealed Translation of John's Revelation Given by the Lord Jesus Christ to Archie J. Inger, published in Oakland, California in 1908 when he was 25 years old, which claims to be an explanation of The Apocalypse of John provided by Christ himself. The book in its entirety was intentionally not restrictively copyrighted, and online and published editions have gradually become widely available. Google Books and other websites offer full downloadable texts of the Translation of John's Revelation as well as a smaller companion text entitled Historical Fulfillment of John's Revelation.

A lengthy description of Inger is in the 1912 book The Strenuous Life Spiritual and The Submissive Life. Author Albert Van der Naillen of the California Academy of Sciences wrote:

"Rev. Mr. Castro was one of the first and most deeply interested in Mr. Inger, and made a careful study of the young man's life and works. Later, the Rev. Mr. Castro was one of a formal committee of clergymen and teachers who examined Inger for days, and pronounced his work not only sincere, but wonderful...The San Francisco Examiner prints the following: Archie J. Inger, a boy in years, but a man in ordinary intellect, a youth of humble origin, has produced an interpretation of the revelation of the New Testament book of St. John that is astounding to doctors of divinity and trained theologians. This amazing document running upwards of 100,000 words, is strikingly phrased and bears the stamp of thought far beyond the normal action of this youthful mind..."

The March 13, 1910 edition of the Los Angeles Times published a report about Inger headlined "BOY PROPHET IS ODD STUDY. Says Divine Revelations Are Made Through Him; Declares Christ Is Here, But Is Not Recognized; Predicts Great European War Over Ottoman Empire." On March 13, 2010, the Times republished the entire article online.

The Wednesday November 3, 1909 edition of the Los Angeles Herald contained this mention of Archie Inger:

"Young Man Who Claims to Be Spiritually Guided Will Lecture at Blanchard Hall"

Archie J. Inger, a young man 26 years old, who claims to be the prophet of God, will speak at Blanchard hall Saturday night on the coming of the Fifth Universal Empire and the Prophecies of Daniel.

Inger's case is interesting in that he attracted widespread attention six years ago in Oakland, when he claimed he heard voices directing him to "come over to Jesus Christ" and later wrote a 300-page book entitled, 'Revealed Translation of John's Revelation' having at the time practically little education and no understanding of the scriptures. He was interviewed by a score of clergymen and professional men, who confessed themselves puzzled at his seeming understanding and mysterious force.

Inger had worked at various trades before receiving the "command," and had received but little education to fit him for his work. He has a mother and two brothers living in Oakland. The young man charges no admission to his lectures and claims to be backed by prominent men in the north, who pay his expenses. It is said he is gradually building up a following, although he disclaims any intention of forming a sect.

Inger says the spirit voice is with him at his talks to the people and that before he goes on the platform to speak he has not the slightest idea of what he is going to say excepting that he is going to speak on a stated subject. "the words flow from me," he says, "with no effort on my part. It is Christ speaking through me."

Inger, although 26 years old, scarcely looks 20. He is of slight build, with an almost spiritual face and appears sincere in his convictions.

On Tuesday November 9, 1909, the same Los Angeles Herald reported on page 5:

"Archie J. Inger, a prophet of god, will speak at Symphony hall Tuesday evening. An admission of twenty-five cents will be charged to defray expenses."

In the twelfth chapter of Inger's Revealed Translation..., there is a sudden overt mention of another Christian spiritualist, Levi McKeen Arnold, a businessman in Poughkeepsie, New York who claimed to begin receiving revelations from Jesus Christ on April 5, 1851. This paragraph in Inger's work endorses the History of Origin of All Things as being a credible body of revelation similar to his own work:

"...But what has transpired beforehand which pertains to the prophesy of John's revelation of the woman and the child? My prophet (Archie J. Inger) wishes to write it because it has been made known to him, but I have caused him to erase it in consequence of his own wish, as he should have had no wish in the matter. Therefore I will not write through his wish; but will refer you to the book entitled: History of The Origin of All Things" which was written by Me, the Lord Jesus Christ, through an humble medium, even as this is written through an humble medium, even as this is written through this medium, and therefore bears witness through this book to the absolute truth through this medium, and therefore bears witness through this book to the absolute truth of "The History of The Origin of All Things," even as I bear witness in that book to this one, and to this Prophet, were it able to be seen, which it is to those who earnestly seek after righteousness unabashed by prejudice and superstition. Even so. Amen."
