= Heinrich Klaustermeyer =

Gestapo officer

- Klaustermeyer after his arrest in the 1960s
- Born: Karl Heinrich Klaustermeyer; 22 February 1914; Bünde, Province of Westphalia, Kingdom of Prussia, German Empire
- Died: 21 April 1976 (aged 62); Bielefeld, North Rhine-Westphalia, West Germany
- Known for: Stroop Report
- Status: Deceased
- Motive: Nazism; Thrill
- Conviction: Murder (9 counts)
- Penalty: Life imprisonment with hard labour

Details
- Victims: 9+
- Span of crimes: 1941–1944
- Country: German-occupied Poland
- Location: Warsaw Ghetto
- Target: Jews
- Date apprehended: February 1961
- SS career
- Allegiance: Germany
- Branch: Schutzstaffel
- Service years: 1939–1945
- Rank: Oberscharführer
- Unit: Gestapo

Karl Heinrich Klaustermeyer (22 February 1914 – 21 April 1976) was a German Nazi Party official who served in the Gestapo, NSKK, and SA. During World War II, he was stationed in the Warsaw Ghetto, where he personally murdered multiple Jewish civilians and participated in the suppression of the Warsaw Ghetto Uprising. After the war, he settled down in West Germany. Klaustermeyer was investigated by German prosecutors and arrested in the early 1960s. In 1965, he was found guilty of war crimes and sentenced to life in prison by the Bielefeld regional court. He was released from prison in 1976 on health grounds due to terminal cancer and died less than two weeks later.

== Early life ==
Klaustermeyer was born to a skilled painter in Bielefeld. After finishing an apprenticeship as a motor vehicle fitter, he became unemployed during the Great Depression. Klaustermeyer joined the Nazi Party and the SA in 1932. He later got a job as a messenger with the city of Bünde. Klaustermeyer joined the Wehrmacht in 1935 but was discharged on health grounds in 1937. Klaustermeyer he was rehired as a caretaker in Bünde. During this time, Klaustermeyer actively boycotted Jewish stores in the city.

== Gestapo career ==
In 1939, Klaustermeyer joined the Gestapo in Bielefeld. In November 1940, he was transferred to be security police and a member of the Sicherheitsdienst in the Warsaw District. In the autumn of 1941, he was assigned the task of monitoring Jews in the Warsaw Ghetto. Klaustermeyer gained a reputation for his ruthlessness towards Jewish people, who he sometimes shot arbitrarily and indiscriminately. One witness would later testify that, among other things: "I stood just a few meters away and had to watch Klaustermeyer shoot my mother, wife and my three-month-old child...." On occasion, Klaustermeyer would ride a bike into the ghetto with an acquaintance, Josef Blösche, and shoot people at random.

During the dissolution of the ghetto, Klaustermeyer accompanied as a local expert. He also participated in the suppression of the Warsaw Ghetto Uprising in 1943 with commander Jürgen Stroop. Near the end of 1943, Klaustermeyer was tasked with excavating and burning the bodies of Jews who had been murdered earlier, as part of Sonderaktion 1005. After participating in the suppression of the Warsaw Uprising in 1944, Klaustermeyer left Warsaw.

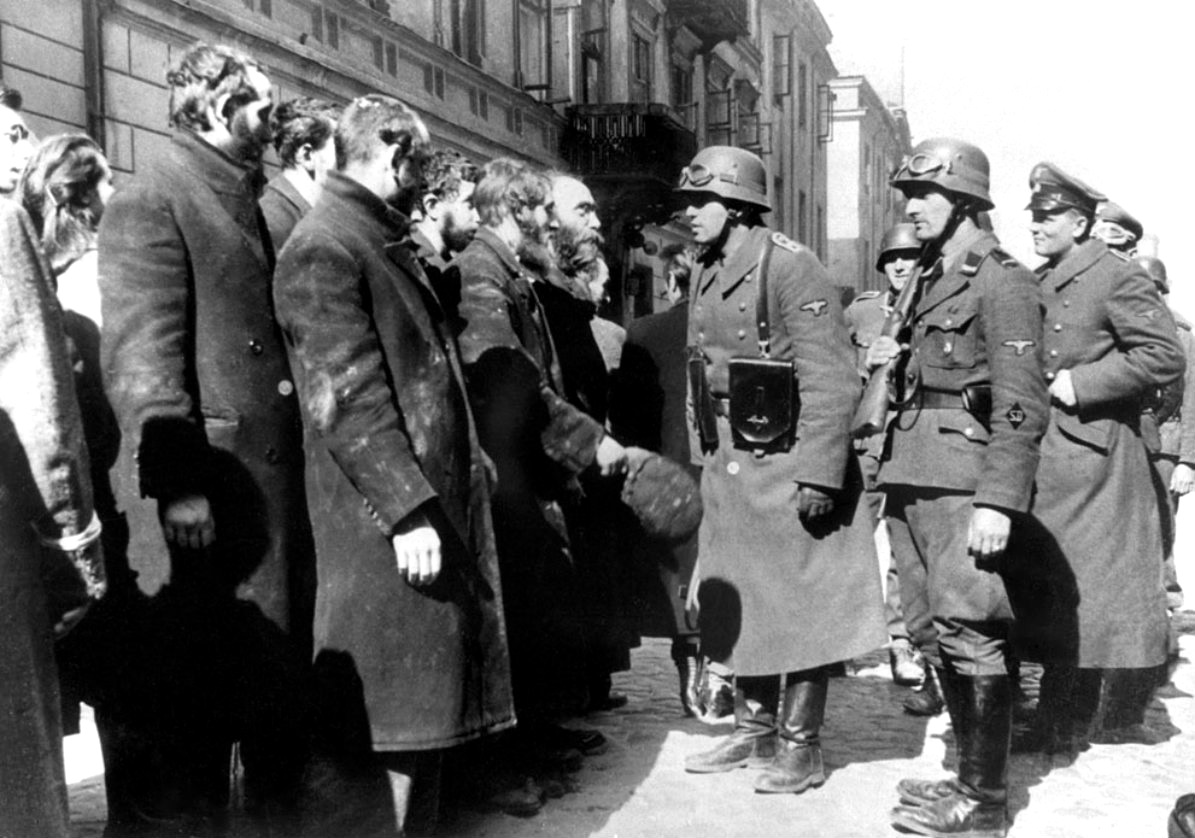
Photo from Nowolipie Street. In the back (from the left) are townhouses at Nowolipie 32 (fragment), 30 and 28.

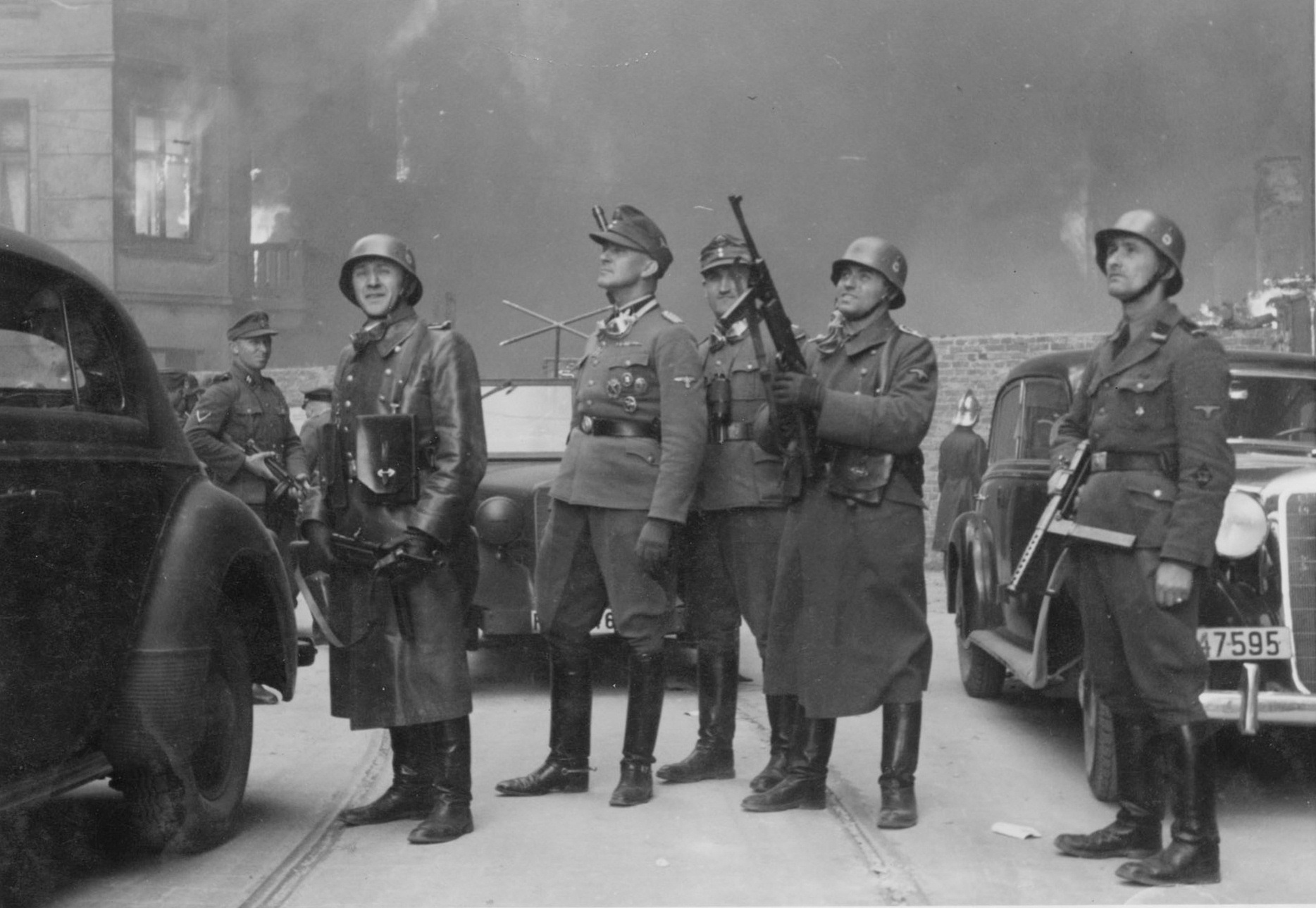
Blösche at right, 2nd from right is Heinrich Klaustermeyer, Jürgen Stroop at center, watching housing blocks burn during the Warsaw Ghetto Uprising. Picture taken at Nowolipie street looking East, near intersection with Smocza street. On the left burning balcony of the townhouse Nowolipie 66.

== Post-war ==
After Germany's surrender, Klaustermeyer was detained by British occupation forces and sent to an internment camp. He was released in late 1947, only to be re-arrested for being a member of the Gestapo. During his denazification trial, Klaustermeyer was incriminated in his boycotting of Jews in the 1930s, but not for the murders he committed in Warsaw. He was quickly released. Klaustermeyer then settled down in West Germany, getting married and getting a job as a driver.

In February 1961, Klaustermeyer was exposed after his name was mentioned during the investigation of former Nazi official Ludwig Hahn. He was arrested and admitted to having been a member of the Gestapo in Warsaw from 1941 to 1944. During the investigation, Klaustermeyer implicated Blösche, now living in East Germany. Blösche was arrested in 1967, tried for war crimes, and executed in East Germany 1969. Klaustermeyer himself was put on trial as a war criminal in west Germany.

Klaustermeyer's trial was supposed to start in 1963, but was delayed for Hahn's trial. While awaiting trial, he served time in a prison in Hamburg, then another in Bielefeld. Klaustermeyer's trial started on 23 November 1964. He was charged with murdering 20 Jews. More than 80 witnesses in Germany and abroad came to testify, and multiple newspapers reported on the trial. On 4 February 1965, Klaustermeyer was found guilty of murdering nine Jews in the Warsaw Ghetto. The judge noted that the proven victims were killed entirely of his own volition and his "sheer lust for murder." He said that Klaustermeyer, who maintained his innocence, had hated Jews his entire life and showed no signs of remorse. According to Nazi-era reports, between April and December 1941 alone, more than 7000 Ghetto inmates had died from "bullet wounds" in the street, which means they were shot for no other reason other than that an SS or another German official walked past. Klaustermeyer was sentenced to nine life terms with hard labor and ordered to permanently forfeit his civil rights. Dying from advanced cancer, he was released from prison on 8 April 1976. Klaustermeyer died in Bielefeld 13 days later.
