= Josef Blösche =

SS officer & convicted war criminal (1912–1969)

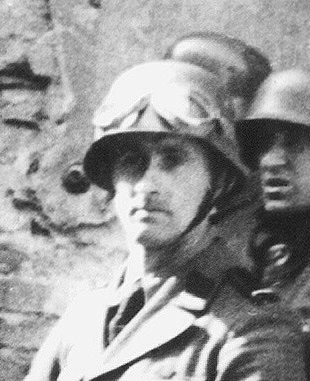
- Blösche as he appeared in the Warsaw Ghetto boy photograph
- Born: 12 February 1912; Friedland in Böhmen, Austria-Hungary
- Died: 29 July 1969 (aged 57); Leipzig Prison, East Germany
- Other name: Frankenstein
- Known for: Being the only person to be conclusively identified in the Warsaw Ghetto boy photo
- Political party: Sudeten German Party; Nazi Party
- Status: Executed by shooting
- Motive: Nazism; Sadism; Thrill
- Convictions: War crimes Crimes against humanity
- Penalty: Death

Details
- Victims: 2000+
- Span of crimes: 1941–1945
- Country: Poland and Belarus
- Target: Jews
- Date apprehended: 11 January 1967
- SS career
- Allegiance: Nazi Germany
- Branch: Schutzstaffel
- Service years: 1938–1945
- Rank: Rottenführer
- Unit: Sicherheitsdienst

Josef Blösche (12 February 1912 – 29 July 1969) was a German war criminal and a member of the Nazi Party who served in the SS and SD during World War II. Blösche personally executed many Jews, participated in several massacres, and helped send many more to their deaths in extermination camps.

Blösche became known to the world because he was photographed five times with SS forces that suppressed the Warsaw Ghetto Uprising, as published in the Stroop Report. The most famous photograph portrays a boy surrendering in the foreground, and Blösche as the SS man who is facing the boy with a sub-machine gun in hand. The Report was used in prosecuting former Nazis for war crimes. Blösche initially avoided detection after the war due to an accident that permanently scarred his face. During the Warsaw Uprising, he earned a reputation as a "brutal sadist, murderer, and rapist", being nicknamed "Frankenstein".

West German prosecutors were able to identify Blösche in 1962. East German officials became aware that Blösche was living somewhere in East Germany after receiving documents on the West German case. He was subsequently located by the Stasi and arrested on 11 January 1967. Blösche was convicted of numerous atrocities and sentenced to death by the Erfurt regional court; he was executed in Leipzig on 29 July 1969.

== Career ==
Blösche was born in Friedland in Böhmen, Austria-Hungary (today Frýdlant, Czech Republic). This was in the northern part of Bohemia very near the borders of Germany and present-day Poland. His parents were ethnic Germans: his father, Gustav Blösche, owned a farm and a gasthaus (country inn). Josef began to work on the farm and at the inn while going to school, but his father pulled him out of school at the age of 14 to work full time.

Blösche participated in right-wing youth organizations promoting Nazi causes, and he joined the Sudeten German Party, a pro-Nazi group advocating German expansion. In 1938, he joined the Nazi Party and the SS after Germany annexed the Sudetenland. Blösche, who had previously volunteered for local SS, joined the Waffen-SS on 4 December 1939 and reported to training the following day at Pretzsch Castle. He completed his training on 14 March 1940 and was assigned to Warsaw. He was shortly assigned to patrolling 6 miles (9.7 km) of the Bug River.

After serving in Warsaw with the SS, Blösche joined the Sicherheitsdienst (SD; Security Service), a division of the SS. In 1941, he was briefly transferred to the Eastern Front, where he served with Einsatzkommando 8, a subunit of the death squad Einsatzgruppe B. The unit was responsible for mass shootings in Belarus.

Blösche participated in executions in occupied Belarus, before being transferred back to Warsaw. He served in the SD's Warsaw Ghetto outpost in mid-1942, when the mass deportation of Jews to the Treblinka extermination camp started. Blösche hunted down many Jews who were hiding from deportation. In January 1943, during another wave of deportations to the death camps, he took part in another search, which also involved frequent murders or executions. He participated in the shooting of about 1,000 Jews in April 1943. Blösche later admitted that he personally shot approximately 75 Jews that day.

The Jews gave Blösche the nickname "Frankenstein", after the Creature from Mary Shelley's novel Frankenstein, for his brutality, including the raping and killing of women in the ghetto. Together with other SS members, he would go on expeditions in the ghetto and shoot random Jews to terrorize the residents, sometimes for merely looking at him. Blösche and one of his acquaintances, Heinrich Klaustermeyer, would sometimes ride a bicycle into the ghetto and shoot any Jews they encountered. According to a Warsaw Ghetto survivor, Blösche "was the worst of all because he killed people for no reason." Blösche participated in the suppression of the Warsaw Ghetto Uprising, and received the German War Merit Cross for his actions during the uprising. He later took part in the suppression of the Warsaw Uprising.

In May 1945, Blösche surrendered to the Red Army and became a prisoner of war of the Soviet Union. Blösche was sent to a camp administered by GUPVI (Main Administration for Affairs of Prisoners of War and Internees). He was forced to perform hard labour, with officials having him work in quarries and build roads. In early 1946, Blösche was repatriated to the Ostrava Region in Czechoslovakia, still as an internee. While working at a coal mine in August 1946, Blösche was struck by a descending hoist and suffered a fractured skull and serious facial injuries. He was hospitalised in Ostrava.

In the summer 1947, Blösche's labour camp was dissolved and he was set free. His facial scars protected him from discovery as one of the SS troops that were pictured in the official photos taken by Germans of the Warsaw ghetto. He moved to Urbach in Thuringia, East Germany, to begin living a normal life. There, he met a German woman named Hanna Schönstedt, a mother and war widow, and they had two children together before she agreed to marry him. Schönstedt would later say that Blösche was a very loving husband and father who constantly worried about every ailment of their children. He became a master tradesman at a potash works in Menteroda.

== Trial and conviction ==
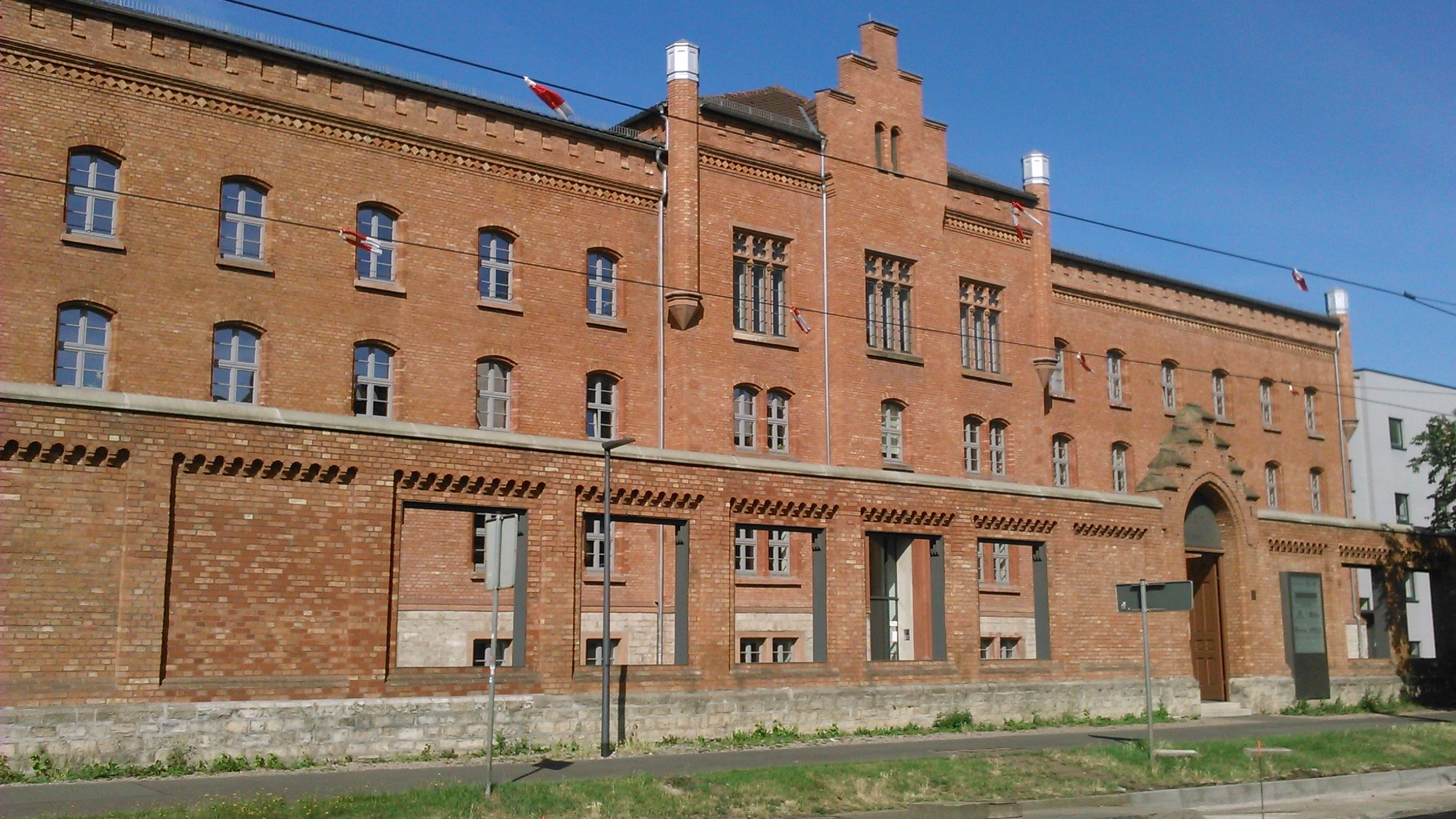
Erfurt Prison, where Blösche was held while on trial in 1969.

In 1961, Klaustermeyer, who was now on trial in West Germany, linked Blösche to the atrocities he had committed in Warsaw. He was identified in 1962. In 1965, shortly after Klaustermeyer's conviction, West Germany requested Blösche's extradition so he could serve as a witness. Blösche was eventually found in Urbach, where he was arrested by the Stasi on 11 January 1967. He was detained in Hohenschönhausen Prison in East Berlin. The extradition request was denied, however, and Blösche was instead put on trial in East Germany in Erfurt in April 1969, and convicted of war crimes. Witnesses at the trial described him as a callous sadist. Blösche did not deny the accusations and openly admitted his guilt. He said he did not remember everything, but that the general accusations were true.

During the trial, the Judge asked Blösche about the events depicted in the infamous photograph of the Warsaw Ghetto boy:

Judge: "You were with a submachine gun...against a small boy that you extracted from a building with his hands raised. How did those inhabitants react in those moments?"

Blösche: "They were in tremendous dread."

Judge: "This reflects well in that little boy. What did you think?"

Blösche: "We witnessed scenes like these daily. We could not even think."

Blösche was sentenced to death and executed in Leipzig on 29 July 1969 by a single pistol shot to the back of his neck.

== Gallery: Warsaw Ghetto Uprising ==
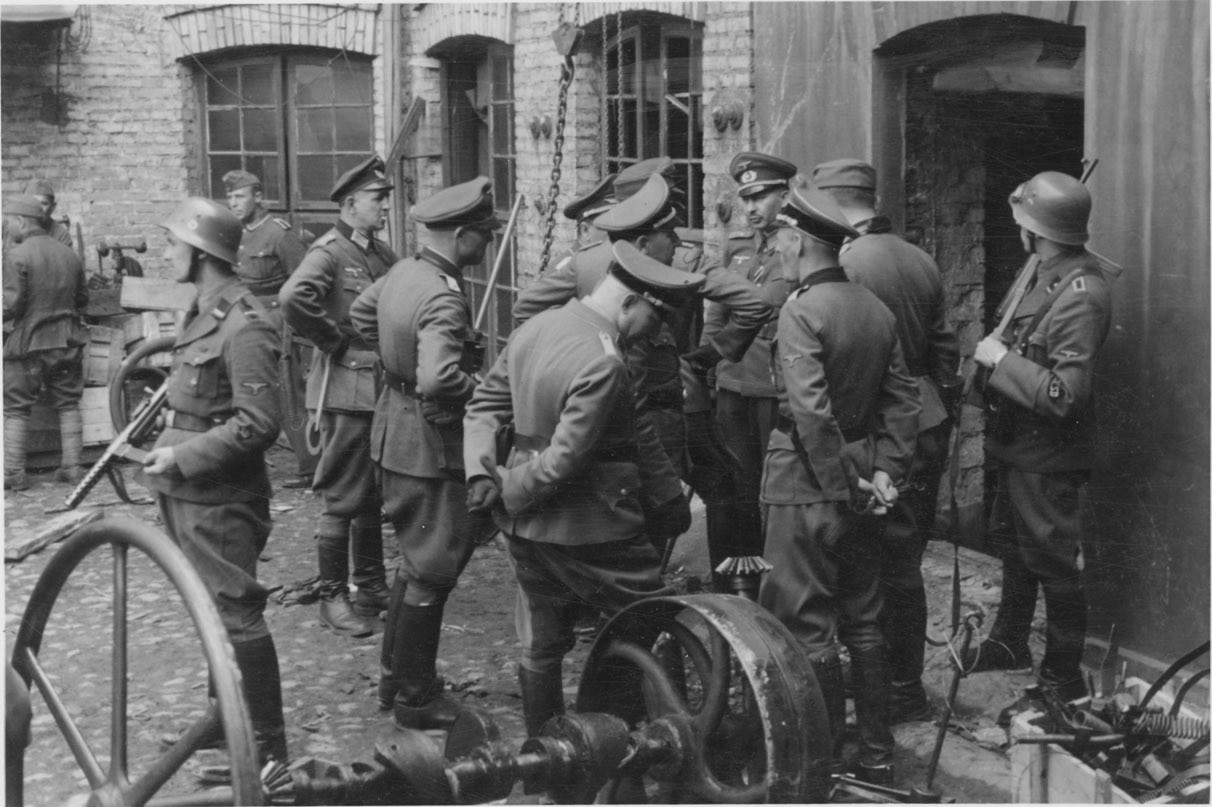
Stroop Report, showing Blösche at left. Original caption "Die Räumung eines Betriebes wird besprochen" {The clearance of a factory is being discussed-Herman Brauer helm repair shop at Nalewki 28–38. 24 April 1943}.

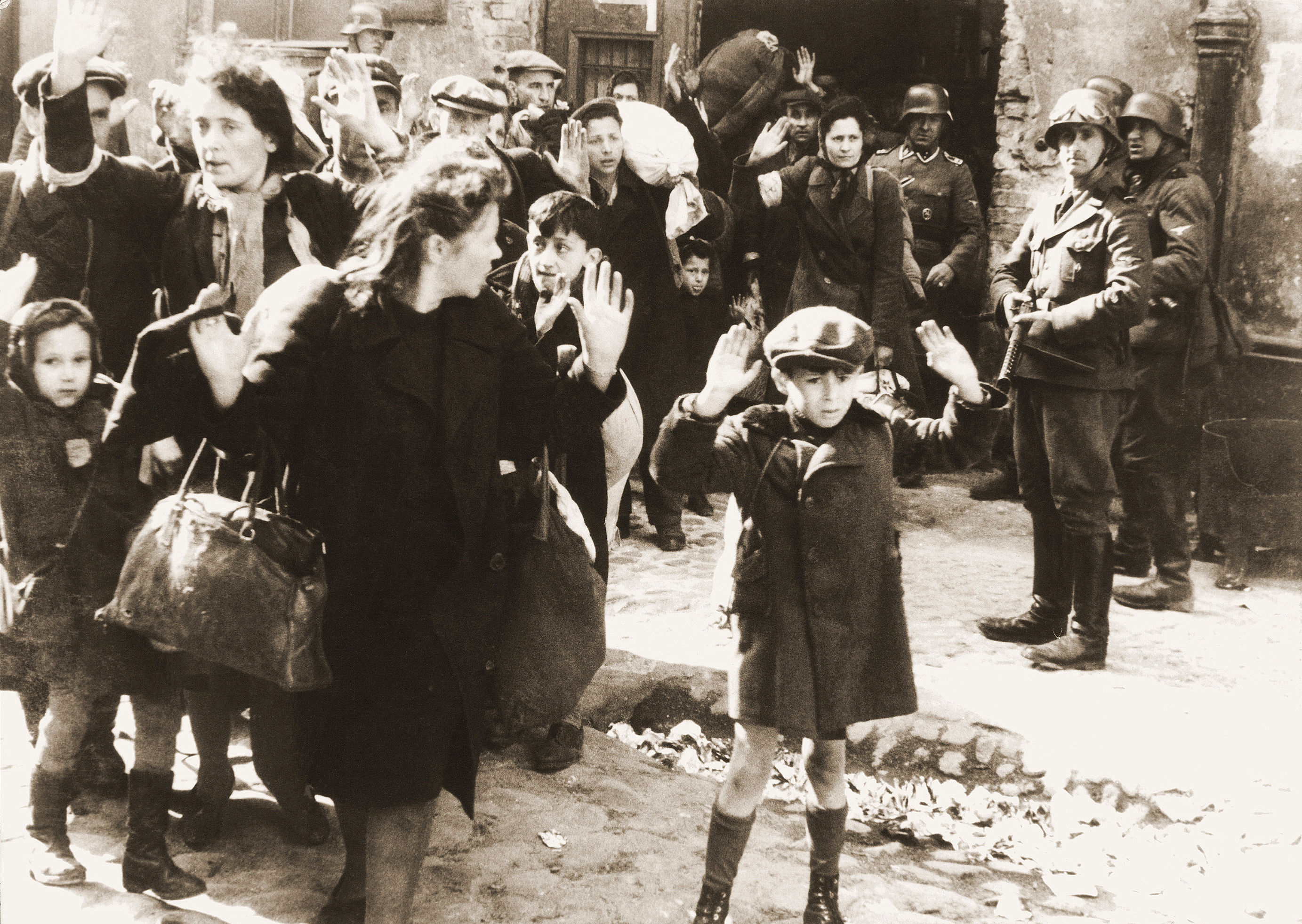
The infamous Warsaw Ghetto boy photograph from the Stroop Report (Blösche with submachine gun on the right).

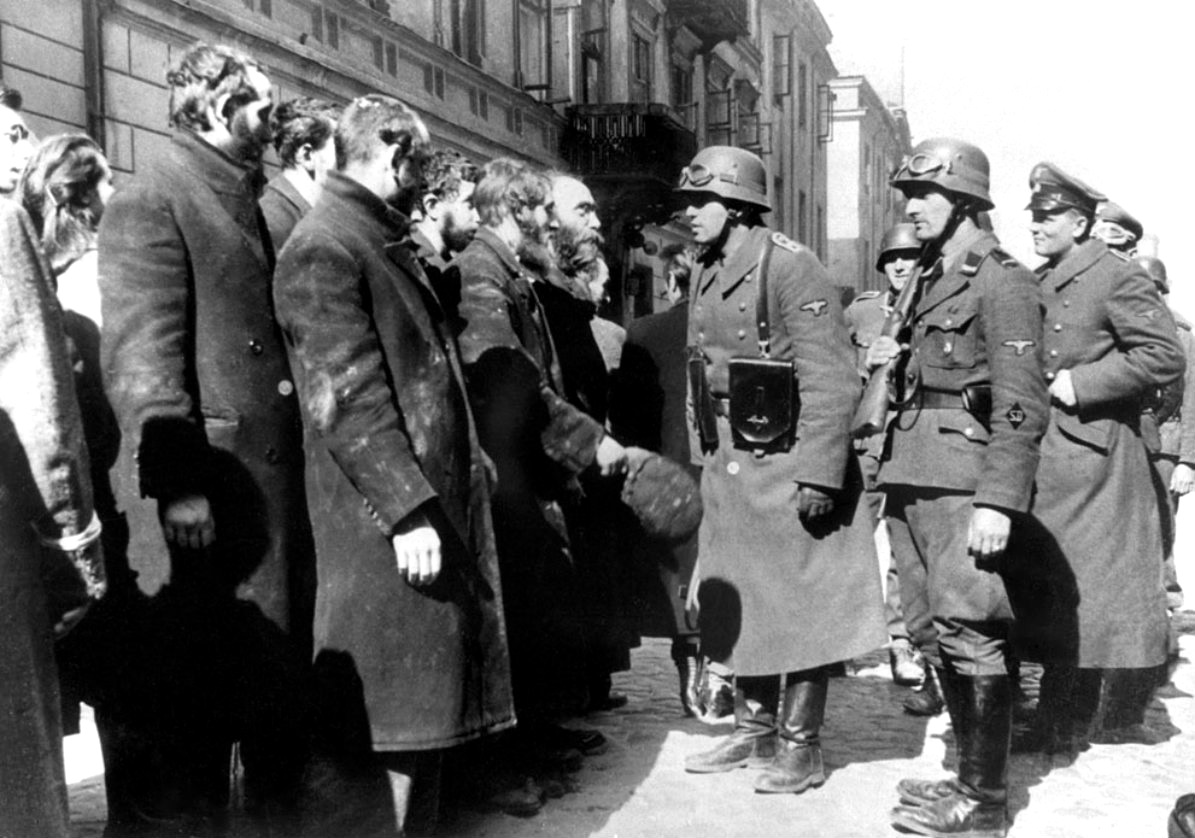
Photo from Nowolipie Street. In the back (from the left) are townhouses at Nowolipie 32 (fragment), 30 and 28; center is Heinrich Klaustermeyer; right Josef Blösche. Similar picture, Stroop Report original caption: "Jewish Rabbis."

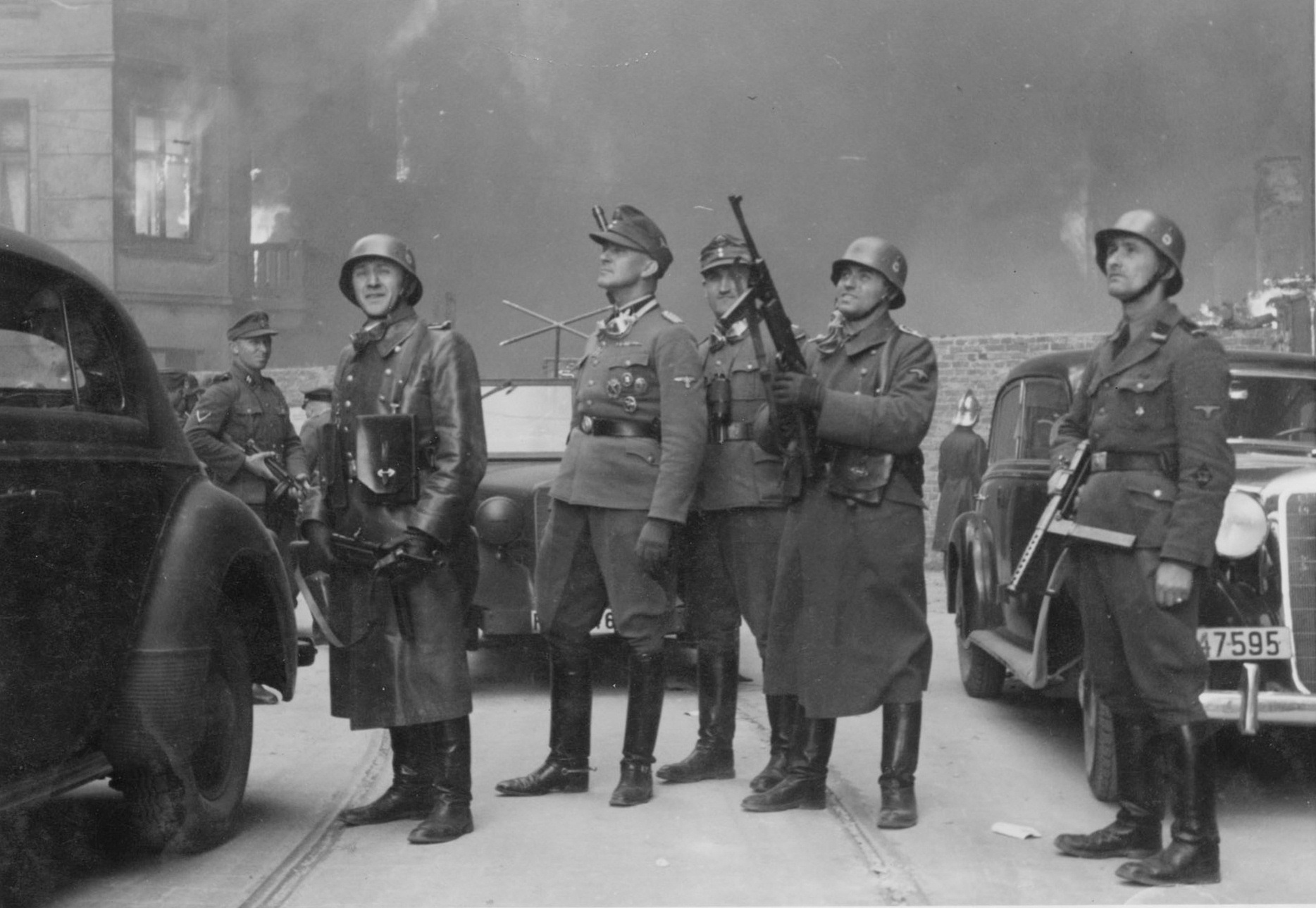
Blösche at right, 2nd from right is Heinrich Klaustermeyer; Jürgen Stroop at center, watching housing blocks burn during the Warsaw Ghetto Uprising. Picture taken at Nowolipie street looking East, near intersection with Smocza street. On the left burning balcony of the townhouse Nowolipie 66.

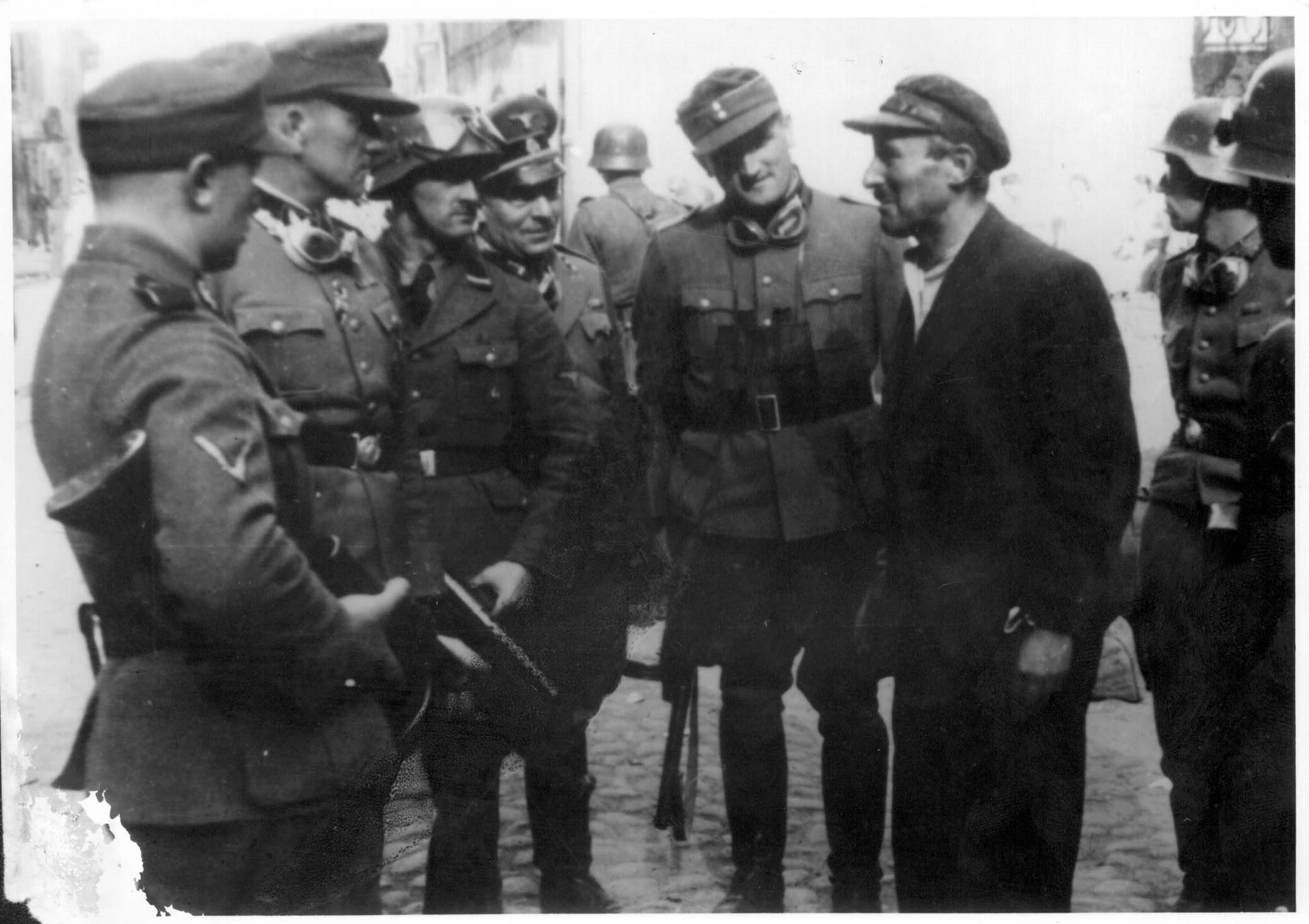
Jürgen Stroop and Josef Blosche with goggles
