= Michael Rosenak =

Israeli philosopher (1932–2013)

Michael Rosenak (Hebrew: מיכאל רוזנק; December 23, 1932 – May 14, 2013) was an Israeli philosopher of Jewish education. He was the Mandel Professor of Jewish Education at The Hebrew University in Jerusalem.

== Biography ==
Michael Rosenak was born in Germany but he grew up in the United States. He graduated Yeshiva University. He emigrated to Israel in 1958. In the 1960s, he taught a popular course at Hebrew University's program for overseas students, "Basic issues in contemporary Jewish life." He held various positions during his academic life, before becoming a full professor at the Melton Centre, and was also noted for his involvement in hands-on educational institutions, such as Kiryat Moriah (World Zionist Organization), the Pardes Institute, the development of the curriculum for the Independent Jewish Day School in London, the Mandel Institute, and many prestigious institutions of Jewish education around the world.

== Education ==
Michael Rosenak had graduated at Yeshiva University (New York): B.A. (sociology) and B.R.E. (Bachelor of Religious Education) (1954). Columbia University (New York), M.A. History (1957). Hebrew University (Jerusalem), PhD, in Education (1976).

== Teaching and academic work ==
Michael Rosenak was a Mandel Professor of Jewish Education at the Hebrew University; Head of Education Studies at “The Jerusalem Fellows”, a division of The Mandel School for Educational Leadership that deals specifically with Jewish educational leadership outside Israel; Lecturer and author. In his field, the Philosophy of Education, Michael Rosenak had concentrated on issues of faith and religion in education, specially in the field of Jewish education, dealing with such matters as the challenge of indoctrination of religious education, value education and the tension between normative and deliberative modes of teaching. He had written on the dialectic relationship between commitment and openness, and on the status of absolute values in democratic society as well as issues of Jewish community and identity. His work has been intended to develop theoretical growing for religious faith that is in authentic dialogue with modernity and democracy, and to build philosophical and educational foundations for communities that wish to foster broad cognitive perspectives in young people.

== Professional engagement ==
Before turning to academic pursuits, Michael Rosenak taught in high schools, and in the framework of educational programs for young people from abroad (i.e., outside Israel). In the 1960s, he taught a popular course at Hebrew University's program for overseas students, "Basic issues in contemporary Jewish life."[2] Michael Rosenak was also noted for his involvement in hands-on educational institutions, such as Kiryat Moriah (World Zionist Organization), the Pardes Institute, the development of the curriculum for the Independent Jewish Day School in London and many prestigious institutions of Jewish education around the world. Michael Rosenak had lectured widely, specially in Jewish communities around the world on educational issues that affect the quality, coherence and cogency of Jewish life. Michael Rosenak had been a board member of The Melitz Institute for Informal Education, Jerusalem; serve on the board of the Center for the Study of Jewish Educational Thought of the Lifshitz College, Jerusalem. He was a member of the Holocaust Commission of The Memorial Foundation for Jewish Culture, New York and had served on the academic advisory board of the Yad Vashem school in Holocaust studies. Michael Rosenak was on the steering committee of the Israeli Society for Research in Jewish Education and as act academic advisor for the Florence Melton Mini – School project for Israel.

== Academic teaching abroad ==
Michael Rosenak had taught in diverse colleges and universities as Stanford University (School of Education); York University, Toronto, Ontario; The Jewish Theological Seminary of America, New York; The Cleveland College of Jewish Studies, Cleveland, Ohio.

== Awards and honors ==
Michael Rosenak had been honored by: The Jewish Theological Seminary of America (1997) - an honorary doctorate. The Hebrew University of Jerusalem - the Samuel Rothberg Prize in Jewish Education (2001). The Hebrew Union College - an honorary doctorate (2003). Yeshivah University (New York) - an honorary doctorate (2008).

== Books and articles ==
- Rosenak, Michael (1968). Israel, land of promise : an educational resource and study guide. New York, N.Y: Union of Orthodox Jewish Congregations of America, Youth Division.
- Rosenak, Michael (1970). Modern problems in Judaism and Jewish education. Jerusalem: Publisher unknown.
- Rosenak, Michael (1982). The Midrash and the modern world. Jerusalem: Institute for Pedagogy in the Diaspora.
- Rosenak, Michael (1986). Teaching Jewish Values: A Conceptual Guide. Jerusalem: The Melton Centre, The Hebrew University. (Spanish edition published by the Melton Centre in 1987; Russian edition published by The Joint Distribution Committee in Jerusalem, 1995).
- Rosenak, Michael (1987). Commandments and Concerns: Jewish Religious Education in Secular Society. Philadelphia: Jewish Publication Society. ISBN 978-0-8276-1108-5.
- Rosenak, Michael (1995). Roads to the Palace: Jewish Texts and Teaching. Providence, Oxford and London: Berghahn Books for the Institute of Education, University of London. ISBN 978-1-57181-058-8.
- Rosenak, Michael (2001). Tree of Life, Tree of Knowledge. Boulder, Colorado: Westview.
- רוזנק, מיכאל (2003). צריך עיון: בין מסורת ומודרנה בחינוך היהודי. ירושלים: הוצאת מאגנס.
- Rosenak, Michael (2013). Covenant and Community. New York: JTSA Press.
- Rosenak, Michael (2002). "Religious Jewish Education and the Holocaust: the theological Dimension". Philosophia. 30 (1–4). Ramat Gan: Department of Philosophy, Bar- Ilan University.
- Rosenak, Michael (2002). Corporal Punishment in Jewish education: a philosophic–educational exploration. Jerusalem: Hebrew University.
- Rosenak, Michael (2002). "Rabbi Eliyahu E. Dessler´s Philosophy of Ultra-Orthodox Education". Festschrift in Honor of Professor Joseph Lukinsky. New York: The Jewish Theological Seminary.
- Rosenak, Michael (Winter 2001). "The Contemporary Ideal of ´An Educated Public´: Mission Impossible?". Panim: Quarterly for Society, Education and Culture (in Hebrew). Tel Aviv.
- Rosenak, Michael (1998). "Foci of Religious Extremism: Educational Dimensions". Hagut: Jewish Educational Thought (in Hebrew). 1. Jerusalem: Center for Jewish Educational Thought.
- Rosenak, Michael (1999). Brown, Michael; Lightman, Bernard (eds.). "Between Texts and Contexts: How May Tomorrow's Jewish Education be Different?" in Creating the Jewish Future. Walter Creek, London, New Delhi: Altamira Press.
- Rosenak, Michael; Eisen, Arnold (1997). Teaching Israel: Basic Issues and Philosophical Guidelines. Jerusalem: CRB Foundation.
- Rosenak, Michael (1997). Sagi, Avi; Safrai, Zeev (eds.). "Between Autonomy and Authority in Religious Education", Between Authority and Autonomy in Jewish Tradition. Tel Aviv: Hakibbutz Hameuhad Publishers.
- Rosenak, Michael (1996). "Jewish education and Jewish Studies". Jewish Studies. 36. Jerusalem: World Union of Jewish Studies.
- Michael Rosenak (1993). "Jewish Fundamentalism in Israeli Education". In Marty, Martin E.; Appleby, R. Scott (eds.). Fundamentalisms and Society: Reclaiming the Sciences, the Family, and Education. The Fundamentalism Project, 2. Chicago, Il; London: University of Chicago Press. pp. 374–451. ISBN 0-226-50880-3.
- Rosenak, Michael (1992). "Commitment and Non-Commitment in Jewish Value Education". Studies in Jewish Education. 6. Jerusalem: Magnes Press.
- Rosenak, Michael (1991). Sacks, Jonathan (ed.). "Towards a Curriculum for the Modern Orthodox School". Orthodoxy Confronts Modernity. Hoboken, N.J.: Ktav Publishing House, Inc.
- Michael Rosenak's website: http://hamutallawrence.wix.com/rosenak

== Festschrift ==
- Cohen, Jonathan, ed. (2006). Languages and literatures in Jewish education : studies in honor of Michael Rosenak. Jerusalem: Hebrew University, Magnes Press. ISBN 9789654933025.
