= Levi Scott =

Levi Scott may refer to:

- Levi Scott (bishop) (1802–1882), bishop of the Methodist Episcopal Church
- Levi Scott (Oregon politician) (1797–1890), helped blaze the Applegate Trail in the U.S. state of Oregon
