= Levi Yates =

English footballer (1891–1934)

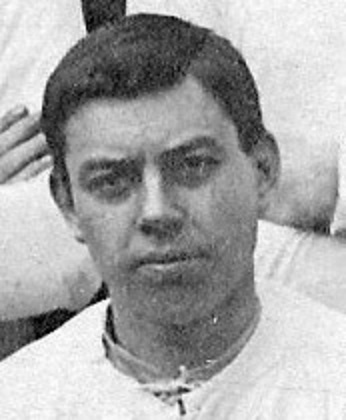

Personal information
- Full name: Levi Yates
- Date of birth: 1891
- Place of birth: Church Gresley, England
- Date of death: 1 May 1934 (aged 42–43)
- Place of death: Church Gresley, England
- Position: Centre forward

Senior career*
Years	Team	Apps	(Gls)
1913-1914	Gresley Rovers		
1913–1914	Nottingham Forest	10	(1)
1914-1915	Gresley Rovers		
- * Club domestic league appearances and goals

Levi Yates (1891 – 1 May 1934) was a football player who made ten appearances in the English Football League playing for Nottingham Forest.

Yates started his career at Gresley Rovers. He was transferred to Forest for £100 during the 1913–14 season and made his Nottingham Forest debut on 18 October 1913 against Blackpool in a 3–0 victory. He scored his only goal for Forest against Notts County on Christmas Day 1913. His last game was the final game of the season on 25 April 1914 away at Stockport County.

Yates returned to Gresley Rovers for the 1914–15 season.

Yates died on 1 May 1934 in Church Gresley at the age of 42.
