= Levi McKeen Arnold =

Businessman, banker and author (1813–1864)

Levi McKeen Arnold (L.M. Arnold) (b. February 12, 1813 Poughkeepsie, New York - d. September 27, 1864 Poughkeepsie, New York) was a successful businessman (a foundry manager) and banker in New York who claimed to have received revelations from Jesus Christ beginning in the Spring of 1851, first published in 1852 in a book entitled History of the Origin of All Things.

The preparatory revelations commenced April 5, 1851, in the form of movements of the pencil, answers to questions, and words internally heard. Such writings were continued for a year and a few days, when the first book of The History of the Origin of All Things was commenced in a small bound blank book written with lead pencil throughout...

The text of History of the Origin seemingly endorses modern spiritualism of the type popularized beginning in 1848 upon publication of the claims of the Fox sisters, but cautions against indiscriminate access to other realms.

A sketchy biography of Arnold is included in an archived version of the website thehistoryofallthings.com. Arnold's work is endorsed in a similar work published in 1908 by Archie Johnson Inger. Likewise, Arnold's text commends the work of Rev. Charles C. Hammond, who published a collection of spiritualist articles Light from the Spirit World in Rochester, New York in 1852. (An apparent companion volume published at the same time is Light From the Spirit World: The Pilgrimage of Thomas Paine, and others, to the Seventh Circle in the Spirit World.)

Arnold's text states that the New Jerusalem began to alight on planet Earth on July 4, 1776, and predicts that religious freedom would be 'extinguished' in Europe after 1851, but would find refuge in the United States.

...Where, then, shall we look for the outward New Jerusalem! In America. It came down from heaven in 1776. In the succeeding thirty years it acquired strength enough to declare war against the dragon, then represented in its temporality by Bonaparte, Emperor of France and of most of Europe, but certainly Master of Rome. But did the United States declare war at that time against the Emperor of France and Italy? Yes, in effect they did when they threatened war if their demands were not complied with. But a peace had just been concluded and a territory acquired by the United States from France!...

Arnold's parents were Benjamin Arnold and Helen Maria McKeen, and he married Susan Robinson in 1844. A descendant of his, Benjamin L. Arnold published a photograph of L. M. Arnold's gravestone online in March 2008.
