= Levi Casey =

Levi Casey may refer to:

- Levi Casey (politician) (1752–1807), General, United States Representative from South Carolina
- Levi Casey (athlete) (1904–1983), American triple jumper
