= Levi Jerahmeel Klaczko =

Levi Jerahmeel Klaczko (Hebrew: לוי ירחמיאל קליאצקא; born June 28, 1840 in Vilna) was a Russian Jewish educator and author. He was a schoolteacher in Berdyansk, Crimea, and later in Odessa.

Klaczko published various textbooks and books on Jewish prayer. He also contributed numerous articles to Hebrew and Russian periodicals, notably one on the Siddur used by the Jews of Crimea in the journal Ha-Karmel.

== Publications ==
- Erekh Tefillah. Vilna. 1868. A critical investigation of the history and language of Jewish prayer.
- Talmud Torah. Warsaw. 1884. 4th edition, 1890. A religious and historical primer in both Hebrew and Russian.
- Ha-Omen. Warsaw. 1889. A Hebrew primer with a Russian glossary.
- Rishon le-Chinukh. Warsaw. 1892.
- Mesillat Yesharim (3rd ed.). Warsaw. 1898. A Russian-Hebrew schoolbook.
