= Levi Stephen =

Scottish footballer

Personal information
- Date of birth: 19 March 1974 (age 52)
- Place of birth: Hastings, Sussex
- Position: Midfielder

Youth career
- 1990–1992: Rangers

Senior career*
Years	Team	Apps	(Gls)
1992–1993	Clydebank	10	(0)
1993–1997	Montrose	84	(4)
1997	Bon Accord		
1997–1998	Deveronvale		
1998–2000	Sutherland Sharks	32	(6)
2000	Stanmore Hawks	10	(0)
2000–2001	Huntly		
Total		136	(10)
- * Club domestic league appearances and goals

Levi Stephen (born 19 March 1974, also known as Levi Smith) is a Scottish former professional and semi-professional footballer who played as a midfielder.

== Career ==
After signing professionally with Rangers, Stephen played in the Scottish Football League for Clydebank and semi-professionally for Montrose. After playing junior football with Bon Accord and Highland League football with Deveronvale, Stephen played in Australia for the Sutherland Sharks and the Stanmore Hawks, before returning to Scotland in 2000 to play with Huntly.

=== Sexual abuse revelations ===
In April 2017, a BBC Scotland programme Football Abuse: The Ugly Side of the Beautiful Game, featured claims from Stephen about an alleged sexual abuse perpetrator. Stephen claimed former scout Harry Dunn, who had worked for Liverpool, Chelsea, and Rangers, abused him during his time with the latter team. Harry Dunn died before the claims could be brought to trial.
