= Levi Alcon =

American politician (1921–2013)

Member of the New Mexico House of Representatives
- In office 1954–1958

Personal details
- Born: April 3, 1921
- Died: March 12, 2013 (aged 91)
- Party: Democratic
- Spouse: Alice
- Children: 5

Levi Alcon (April 3, 1921 – March 12, 2013) was an American politician who served as a Democratic member of the New Mexico House of Representatives from 1954 to 1958.

== Life and career ==
Alcon was a rancher.

Alcon served in the New Mexico House of Representatives from 1954 to 1958.

Alcon died on March 12, 2013, at the age of 91.
