= Levi Chavez =

American acquitted of murder

- Occupations: Former police officer, Attorney at Law
- Known for: High profile murder case

Levi Chavez is a former police officer in Albuquerque, New Mexico, who was charged with the 2007 death of his 26-year-old wife, Tera Chavez. In August 2013, Chavez was acquitted of the murder charges. Levi was initially charged with murdering his wife with his police issued Glock and making it appear as a suicide. The case made national headlines in 2013 as more details came to light about the case and about Levi Chavez's personal life.

In December 2013, it was made public that Chavez had relinquished his police officer certification.

== Death of his wife ==
The night prior to the death of his wife Tera, Levi had spent the night at his girlfriend's house. The morning of October 22, 2007, he allegedly returned to the couple's home in Los Lunas, New Mexico, where he discovered the body of his wife. Valencia County sheriffs initially ruled the death as a suicide due to the "close proximity of the gun to the body."

One of Chavez's girlfriends testified in court Levi called her to say his wife had just killed herself while he was in the shower.

A different girlfriend testified Chavez's wife knew he had been a part of insurance fraud regarding reporting his truck missing when in fact he had a friend take it and hide it.

== Personal life ==
As the murder case gained more attention from the media and public, Chavez and the Albuquerque Police Department became the targets of heavy scrutiny. Through witness testimony, the public learned that Chavez had been having a number of affairs while married to Tera Chavez. Some of the affairs were with female APD officers.
