= Levi Jensen =

Norwegian evangelist (born 1967)

Levi André Jensen (born 4 July 1967) is a Norwegian evangelist with a background from the Pentecostal community, and part of the charismatic movement. He is associated with methods such as speaking in tongues and laying of hands, and reaches out mainly to youth.

== Evangelism and views ==
Jensen evangelises to a large degree to youth, mostly boys. He uses meetings in town squares and videos in social media, including Snapchat, TikTok, YouTube and Facebook to reach out with the message of Jesus Christ as "the rescue for sinful people." Some of his videos have close to 100,000 views, and he has about 100,000 followers on social media.

Jensen travels across Norway in his RV. By laying of hands, he claims to be able to heal anything including ADHD, cancer and bone fractures, and is often flocked around by youths in his public appearances.

In his videos he has expressed support for conversion therapy for homosexuals, and stated that Southern Norway is "possessed by Satan." He has claimed that COVID-19 has been created by Bill Gates to make money on microchipping people with "the mark of the beast".

He has participated in arrangements held by the Christian television station Visjon Norge, and Christian newspaper Norge Idag. His views and methods have caused controversy and been met with opposition by others, including in Christian communities.
