= David I. Bernstein =

American dean

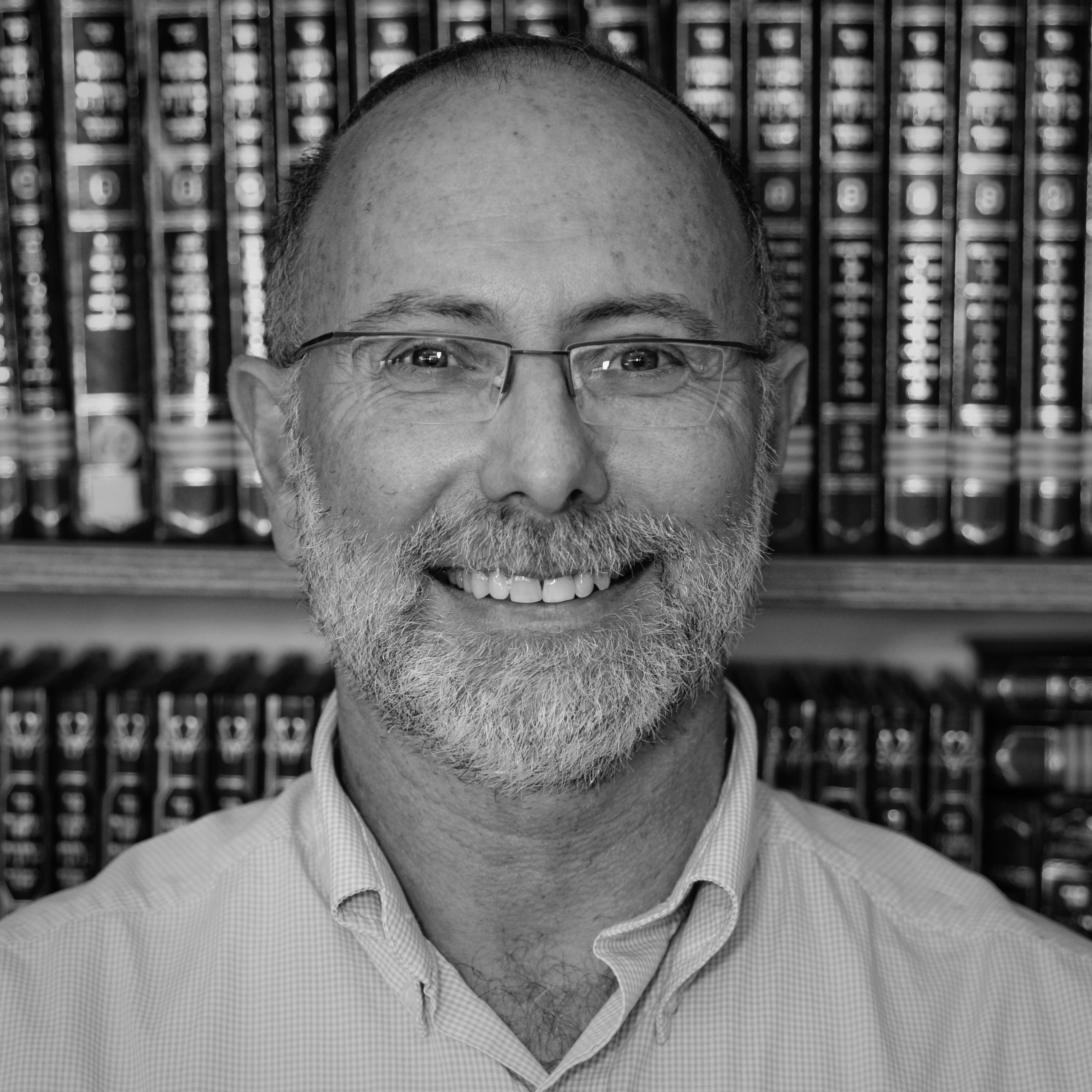
Dr. David I. Bernstein

David I. Bernstein (Hebrew: דוד ברנשטיין) has been the dean of The Pardes Institute of Jewish Studies in Jerusalem and New York City since 1998. Previously, he was the director of Midreshet Lindenbaum, popularly known as Brovender's, for 12 years. Bernstein was a Jerusalem Fellow at the Mandel School for Jewish Education in Jerusalem from 1996-1998.

Bernstein holds a B.A. and M.A. in History and a Ph.D. in Religious Education from New York University. He also attended Yeshivat HaMivtar.

Before making aliyah in 1984, Bernstein was the director of informal education at Ramaz Upper School, a coeducational, private Modern Orthodox Jewish prep school located on the Upper East Side of Manhattan, where he created and taught a 2-year curriculum integrating world- and Jewish-history.
