= Levi Lewis =

Levi Lewis may refer to:

- Levi Lewis (politician) (1762–1828), farmer and political figure in Upper Canada
- Levi Lewis (American football) (born 1998), American football quarterback
- Levi Lewis Dorr (1840–1934), American Civil War veteran and physician
