= Pardes Institute of Jewish Studies =

Jewish educational institution in Jerusalem

Coordinates: 31.7547°N 35.2145°E

- Formation: 1972; 54 years ago
- Founder: Rabbi Michael Swirsky
- Headquarters: Jerusalem
- President: Rabbi Leon Morris
- Dean: David I. Bernstein
- Website: www.pardes.org.il

Pardes Institute of Jewish Studies (Hebrew: מכון פרדס לחינוך יהודי) is an open, inclusive, and intellectually challenging Jewish learning community of over 5,000 learners over its five decades of existence, rooted in Jerusalem with a global network of programs and graduates, the majority of whom have served in Jewish professional life.

== History ==
In 1971, Rabbi Michael Swirsky, a 27 year old American who made Aliyah, came up with the idea of a Jerusalem-based center for Jews of all backgrounds to deeply engage in traditional Torah study in a pluralistic learning environment. Swirsky spent the next year establishing the curriculum, assembling faculty, recruiting students and securing a facility, with the support of the World Zionist Organization.

In 1972, Swirsky launched the Pardes Institute of Jewish Studies as a one-year program combining traditional text-based religious study with religious and academic openess. The institute began at 10 Rehov Gad in Baka, Jerusalem with 25 college students, mainly from North America. Its faculty of rabbis and professors, each teaching one full day each week, included Adin Steinsaltz, David Hartman, and Eliezer Schweid, Pinchas Hacohen Peli, and Michael Rosenak, with Dov Berkovits and Menachem Froman functioning as teaching assistants.

Pardes continued to expand its vision and programs under the leadership of Rabbi Dov Berkovits (1973-77), Rabbi Levi Lauer (1977-1994), and Rabbi Daniel Landes (1995-2016). Pardes launched summer study programs, multi-year fellowships, community education in Jerusalem and major educator training programs. Since 2017, Rabbi Leon Morris has led Pardes, guiding its continued growth in immersive learning, educator training, and lifelong learning for the Jewish Diaspora.

Pardes was originally housed next to Ulpan Etzion in Baka and then moved downtown to Shivtei Yisrael Street. When the opportunity arose, a facility was rented on Pierre Koenig Street in Talpiot. Pardes eventually purchased that space, renovated it, and then leased additional space.

== Programs ==
The Pardes offers a wide range of immersive education and training programs for persons of all background and prior experience.

- The Pardes Year Program
- The Pardes 2.5 and 3-week Summer Programs
- The Pardes Community Education Program
- The Pardes Center for Jewish Educators
- The Pardes Center for Judaism and Conflict Resolution
- The Pardes Learning Seminar
- The Pardes Kollel

== Partnerships ==
Pardes partners include:

- Avi Chai is a sponsor for the Pardes Educators Program
- Hebrew College
- Hillel: The Foundation for Jewish Campus Life
- Jewish Agency for Israel's Masa program

== Impact ==
More than 50 years since its founding, this pluralistic yeshiva's alumni have influenced Jewish life around the world. The Pardes alumni constitute a community of more than 5,000 learners. A summer 2026 alumni impact study found that 53% of Pardes alumni have served in Jewish professional life as Rabbis, educators, and lay leaders.

== See also ==
- Education in Israel
