= Levi Lincoln =

Levi Lincoln may refer to:

- Levi Lincoln Sr. (1749–1820), father, U.S. Representative from Massachusetts and briefly Governor
- Levi Lincoln Jr. (1782–1868), son, Governor of Massachusetts before becoming a Representative
