= Levi Davis =

Levi Davis may refer to:

- Levi Davis (politician) (1808–1897), American politician and lawyer
- Levi Davis (rugby union) (born 1998; disappeared 2022), English rugby union player
