= Levi Brown =

Levi Brown is the name of:

- Levi Brown (offensive tackle) (born 1984), American football offensive linesman
- Levi Brown (quarterback) (born 1987), American football quarterback
- Levi Brown (actor), British actor

== See also ==
- Nathaniel Levi Brown (born 1981), English professional footballer for Macclesfield Town
