= Levi Smith (disambiguation) =

Topics referred to by the same term

Levi Smith may refer to:

- Levi Lathrop Smith (died 1848), American original settler of present-day Olympia, Washington
- Levi P. Smith (1885–1970), American lawyer, banker, and politician
- Levi Ward Smith (died 1863), American politician, lawyer, and minister

See also:

- Levi Smith's Clefs, Australian R&B, pop rock group
