= Levi Fisher Ames =

American artist

Levi Fisher Ames (1840 in Pennsylvania, United States of America – Monroe, Wisconsin 1923) was an American folk artist and woodcarver. In 1880 he photographed and carved actual and make believe beasts for his "cabinet of curiosities" to render a touring tent show named the "L.F. Ames Museum of Art". In 2013 this work was included in the Italian pavilion section of the main exhibition of 'The Encyclopedia of the Mind" in the giardini curated by Massimiliano Gioni for the 55th edition of the Venice biennale d'arte.
