= Levi B. French =

American politician

Member of the South Dakota Senate from the 2nd district
- In office 1889–1892
- Preceded by: none
- Succeeded by: Walter Atwood Burleigh

Personal details
- Born: October 24, 1845 Tekonsha Township, Michigan
- Died: February 19, 1923 (aged 77) Yankton, South Dakota
- Party: Republican
- Spouse: Jeannette Lydia Wells

Levi Butler French (October 24, 1845 – February 19, 1923) was an American politician. He served in the South Dakota State Senate from 1889 to 1892. He also sat in the Dakota Territory Legislature in 1881.
