= Forest of the Martyrs =

Coordinates: 31°46′50″N 35°03′40″E

- יער הקדושים
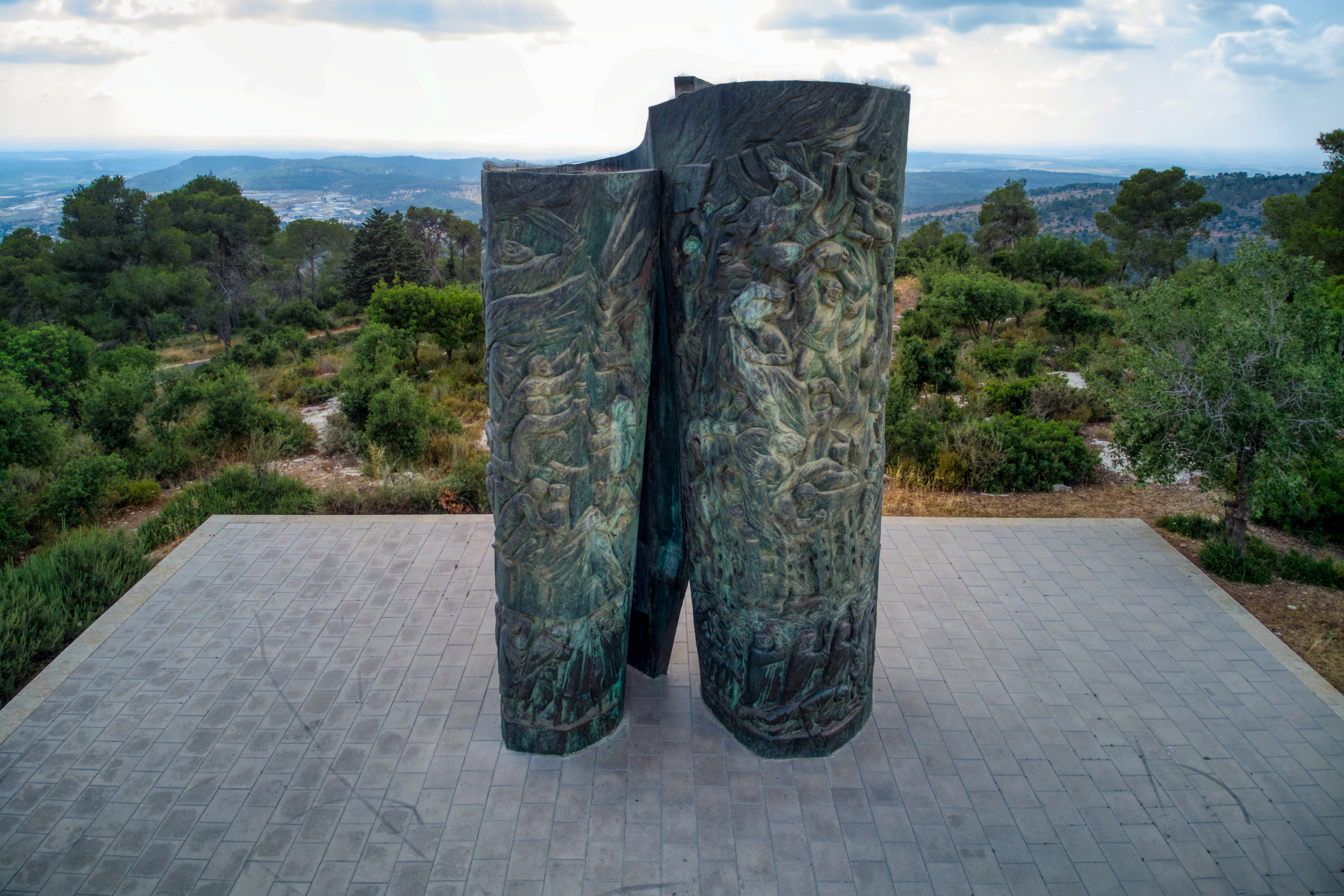
- Scroll of Fire Monument in the Forest of the Martyrs
- Interactive map of Forest of the Martyrs
- Location: Outskirts of West Jerusalem, Israel
- Opening date: 1951
- Dedicated to: The victims of the Holocaust

Forest of the Martyrs (Hebrew: יער הקדושים, romanized: Ya'ar HaKdoshim) is a forest on the outskirts of West Jerusalem, Israel. It is on the western edge of the Jerusalem Forest near Beit Meir. It was planted as a memorial to those who died in the Holocaust and contains six million trees, symbolizing the six million Jews who perished at the hands of the Nazis and their collaborators in World War II. In various parts of the forest, memorial stones and marble plaques bear the names of Jewish communities that were destroyed. Additional monuments commemorate the Righteous Among the Nations as well as the donors who contributed to the establishment of the project.

Annual memorial ceremonies are held at the site on Holocaust Remembrance Day.

== Special sites ==
Forest of the Martyrs includes three main memorial sites :

- Scroll of Fire Monument – an 8-metre-high bronze sculpture shaped like a double Torah scroll, one depicting scenes of destruction of the Jewish people in ancient and modern times, and the second depicting scenes of national rebirth. Located on a hilltop, designed in the form of two cylinders, “Holocaust” and “Revival.” It serves as a memorial to Holocaust victims. The sculpture, created by Nathan Rapoport, was inaugurated in 1972.
- The Martyrs Cave - a natural cave that developed as a place of reflection and communion with the memory of Holocaust victims. The cave is located at the Nahal Kesalon streambed. Along the stream, the names of various communities are inscribed. The site also functions as a parking area and a starting point for hikes in the forest.
- The Anne Frank Memorial - a large cube depicting the annex in which the Frank family and others hid and a depiction of a chestnut tree that could be seen from the annex. The site is located near the Bnai Brith Cave featuring columns inscribed with passages from Anne Frank’s diary. At the end of the site stands a sculpture by Piet Cohen depicting a room with a chair, allowing a visitor to sit as if confined in a cell and look toward a chestnut tree outside, as described by Frank in her diary. The memorial was inaugurated on Holocaust Remembrance Day, 2 May 2011.
- In addition, the forest is located in the heart of the Judean Hills National Park, and it is crossed by numerous cycling paths and hiking trails, including the Israel National Trail.

== History ==
Prior to the planting of the forest, the site was the location of the Palestinian villages of Dayr ‘Amr, Khirbat al-‘Umur, Kasla, Bayt Umm al-Mays, and ‘Aqqur. These villages were depopulated and destroyed by Zionist forces as part of the Nakba during the 1948 Palestine war. The JNF planted forests over most of the depopulated Palestinian villages on its sites in order to conceal their remains. (Note: Kadman 2015: "The JNF has planted forests over most of the depopulated villages on its sites, specifically in order to conceal them.")

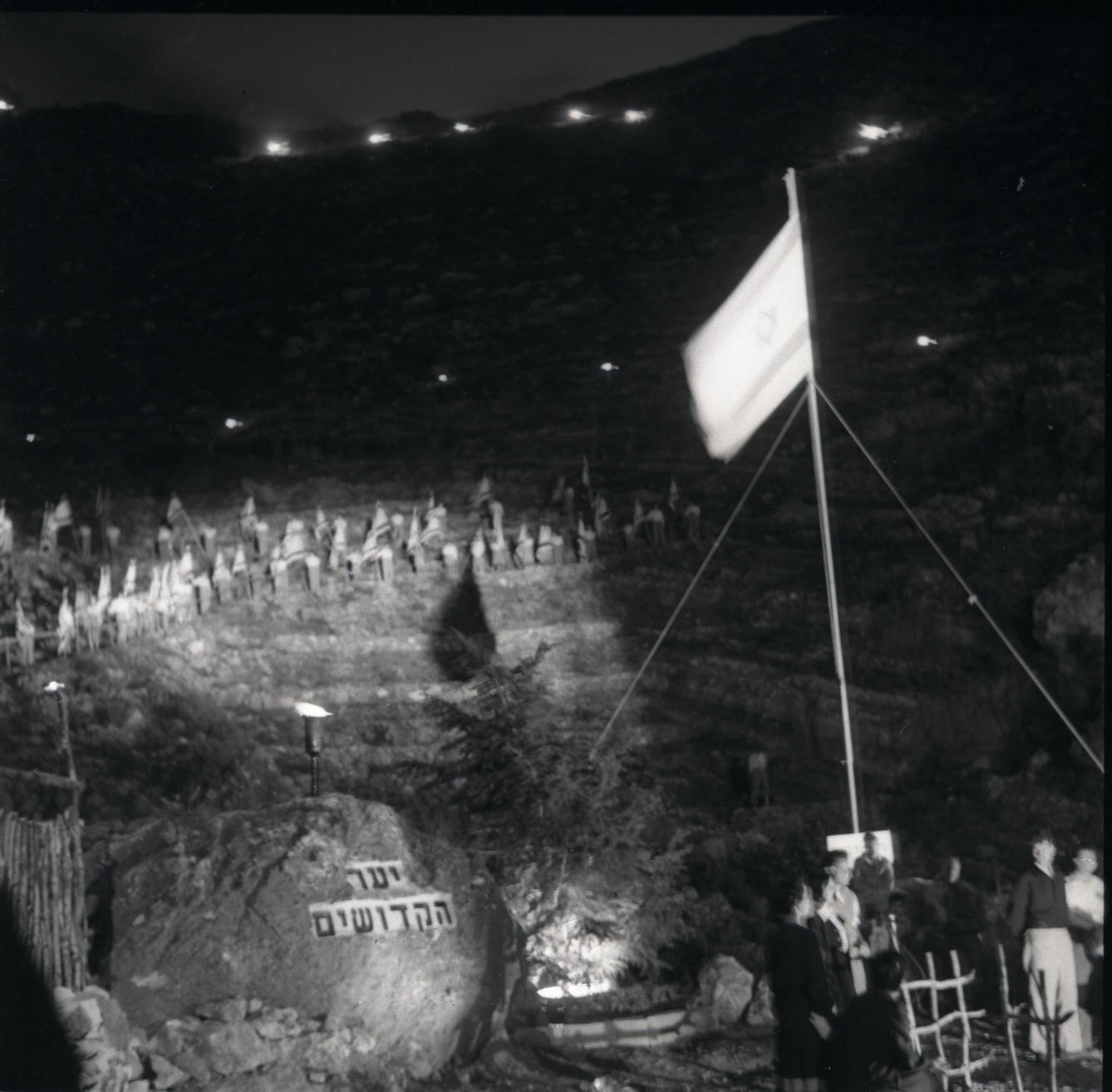
The planting ceremony of the Forest, 1952

The idea of planting the "Forest of the Martyrs" was conceived after the war, and already in the second half of the 1940s, fundraising for the project had begun. The planting of the forest started with a ceremony on March 7, 1951, and continued throughout the 1950s. The World B'nai Brith Jewish service organization financed a significant portion of the planting of the trees by the Jewish National Fund. Taking part in the plantings were members of immigrant associations from each country, representatives of Jewish communities from different nations, and hundreds of Jewish community organizations (Landsmannschaften).

Within the forest, plots were designated for Jewish communities from different countries ("Forest of the Martyrs of Poland," "Forest of the Martyrs of Lithuania," "Forest of the Martyrs of Czechoslovakia," "Forest of the Martyrs of Russia," "Forest of the Martyrs of Hungary," "Forest of the Martyrs of Yugoslavia," "Forest of the Martyrs of Latvia and Estonia," "Forest of the Martyrs of Belgium and the Netherlands," "Forest of the Martyrs of Italy," and more).

In addition to these, special forests were planted: the Ghetto Fighters’ Forest, initiated by the Youth Council for the Jewish National Fund, and the Children’s Memorial Forest (“Their Monument”), initiated by the Teachers’ Council for the Jewish National Fund, which was funded in part by donations from the children of the country and planted by them.

== Gallery ==
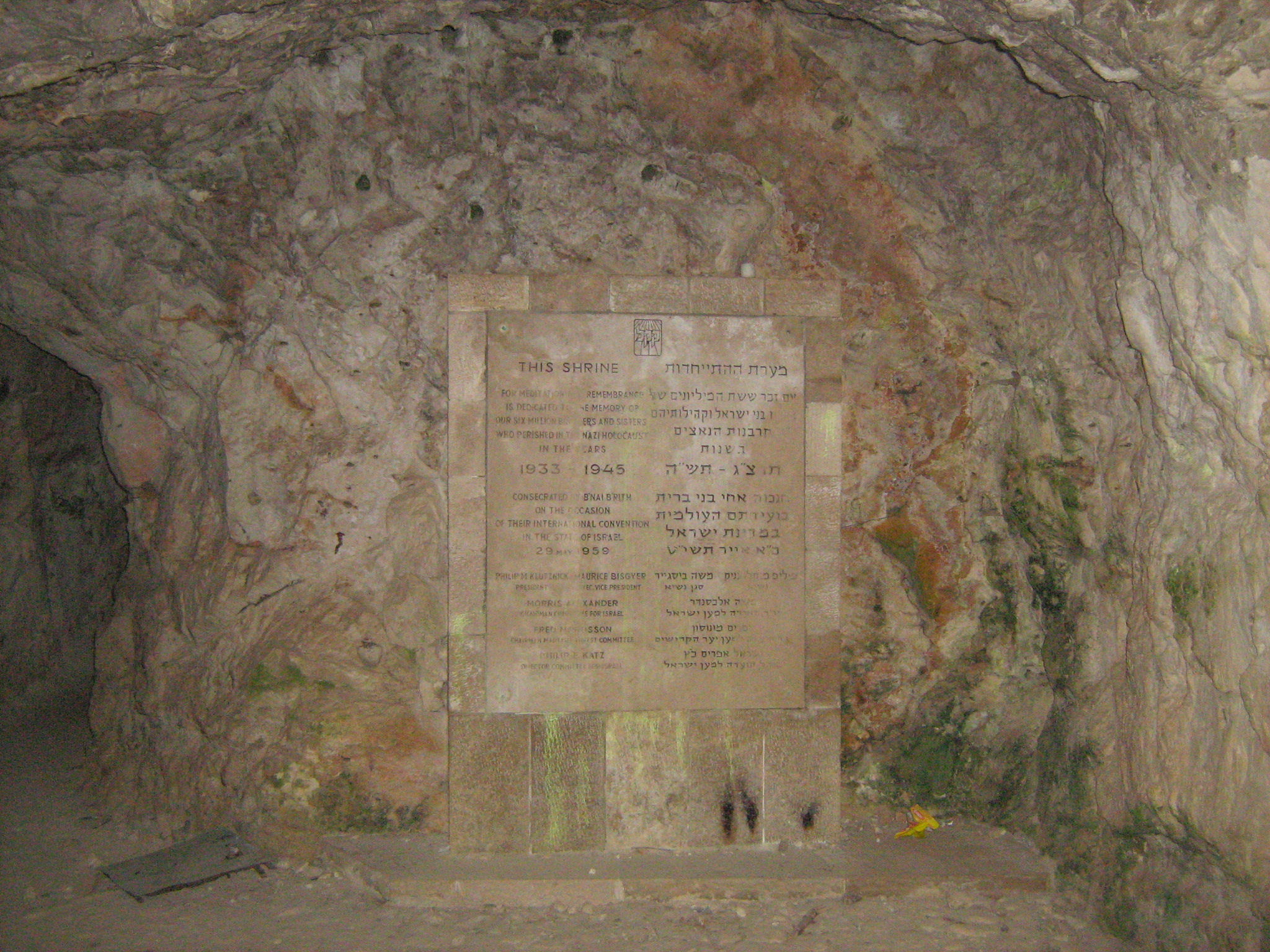
View inside the B’nai Brith Cave

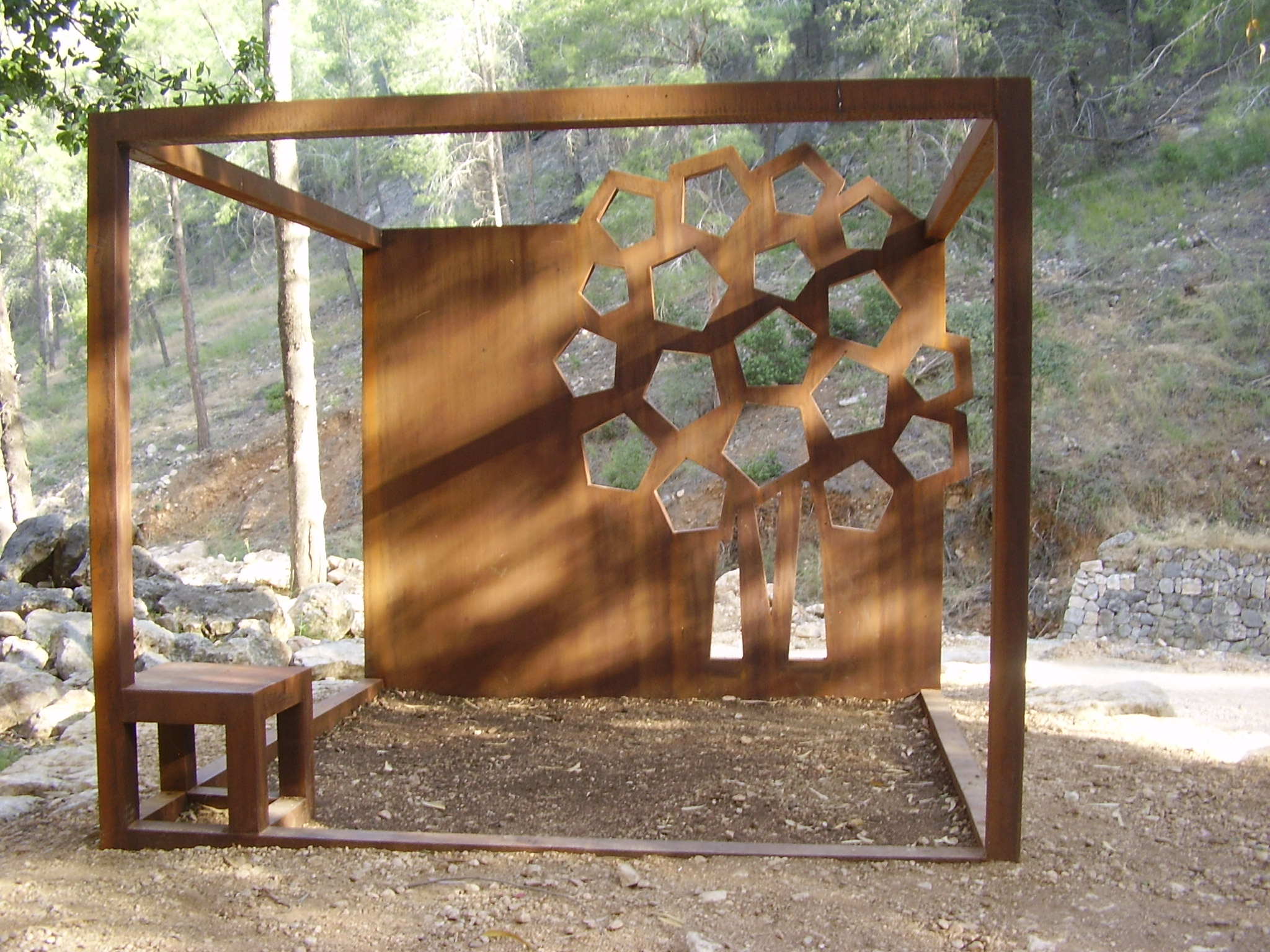
The Anne Frank Memorial in the Forest of the Martyrs

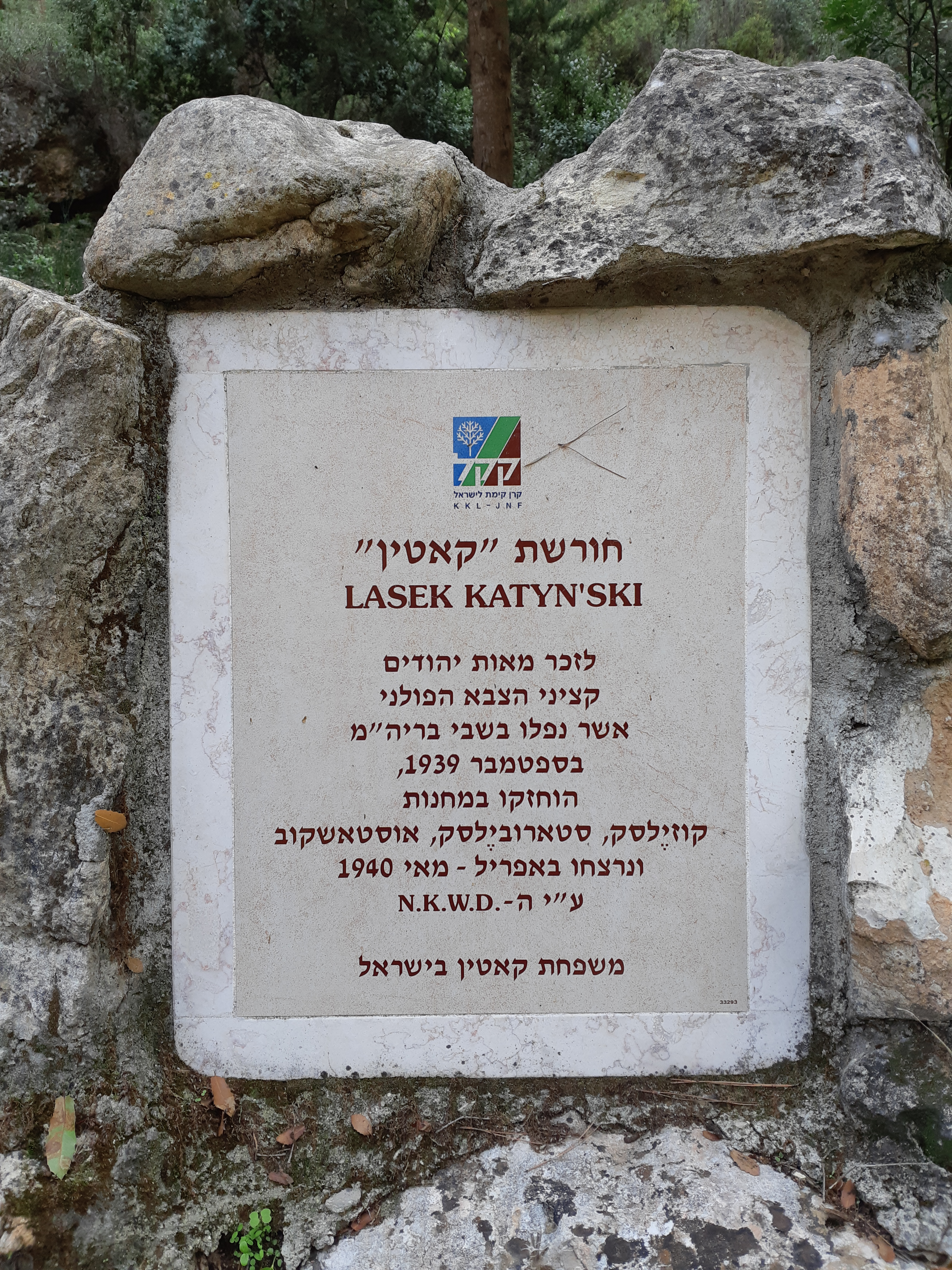
Memorial plaque in the Forest of the Martyrs for the Jewish officers of the Polish Army who were executed in the Katyn area by the NKVD

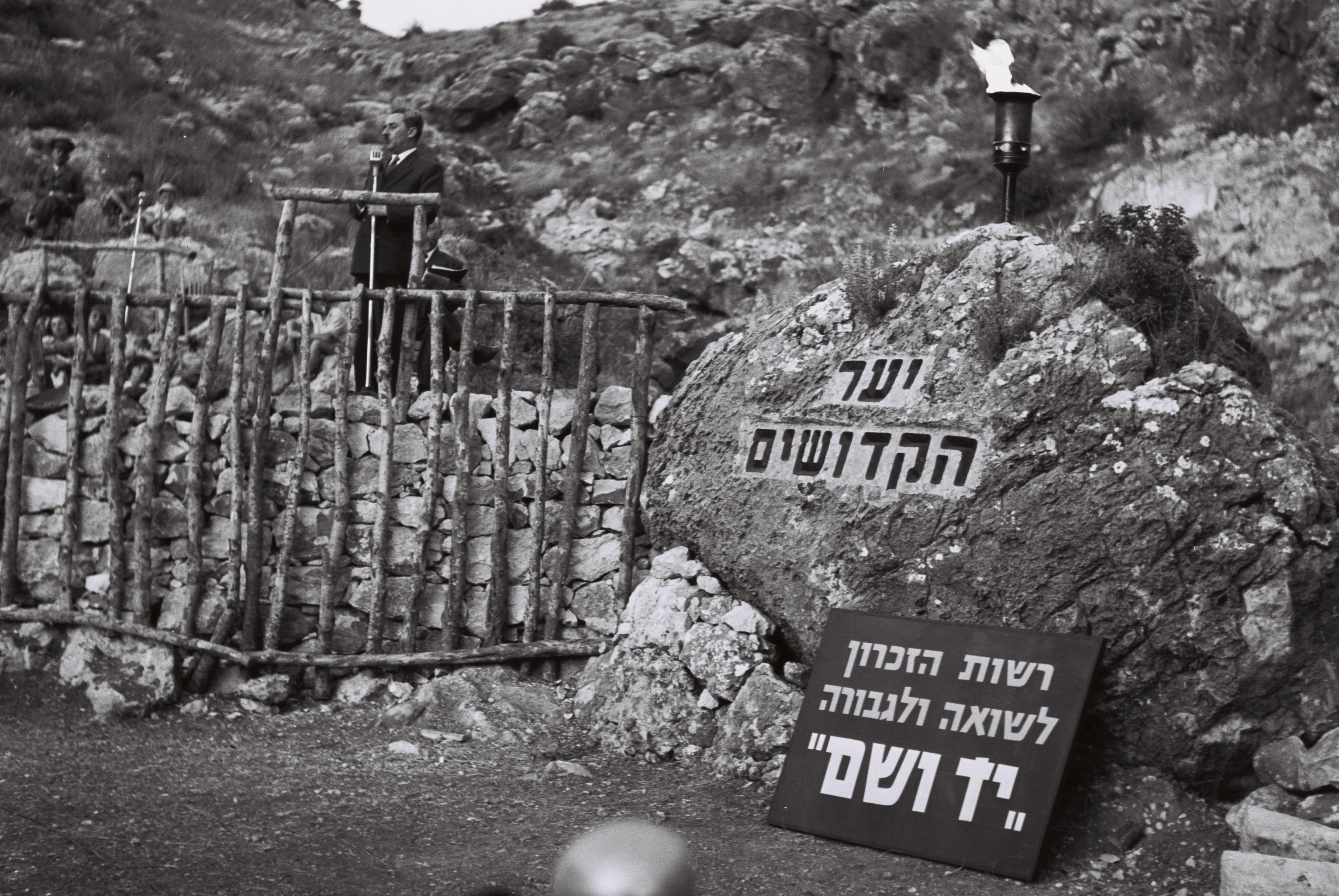
Prime Minister of Israel Moshe Sharett at a Holocaust Remembrance Day ceremony in the Forest of the Martyrs, 1954

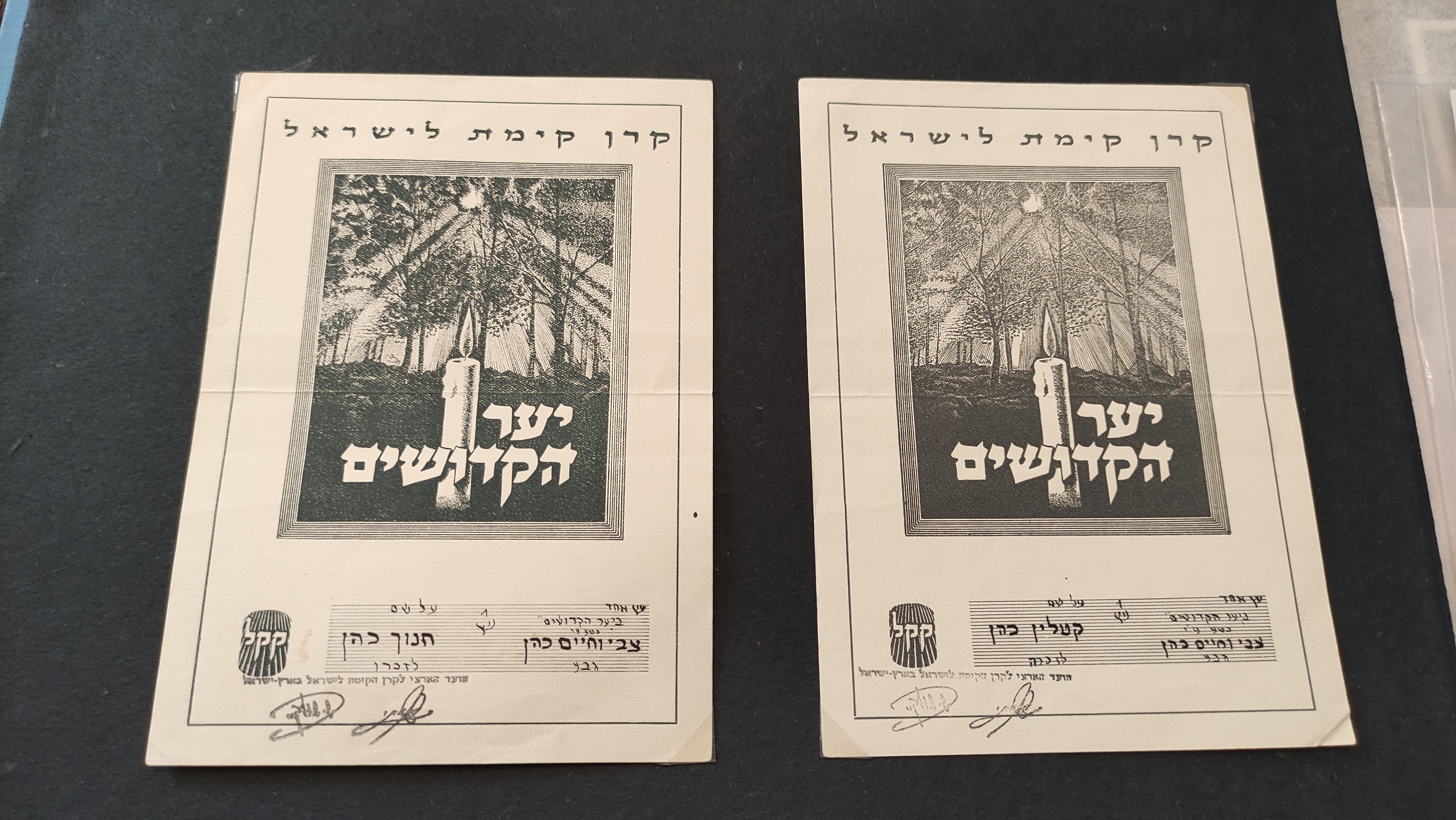
Certificates attesting to the planting of trees in memory of Hanoch and Katelin Cohen in the Forest of the Martyrs

== See also ==
- List of forests in Israel
- Yosef Weitz (1890–1972), first director of the Land and Afforestation Department of the Jewish National Fund
