= Monument to the Ghetto Heroes =

Monument in Warsaw, Poland

- Pomnik Bohaterów Getta w Warszawie האנדרטה לזכר מרד גטו ורשה מאָנומענט פֿאַר די געטאָ העלדן אין ווארשע
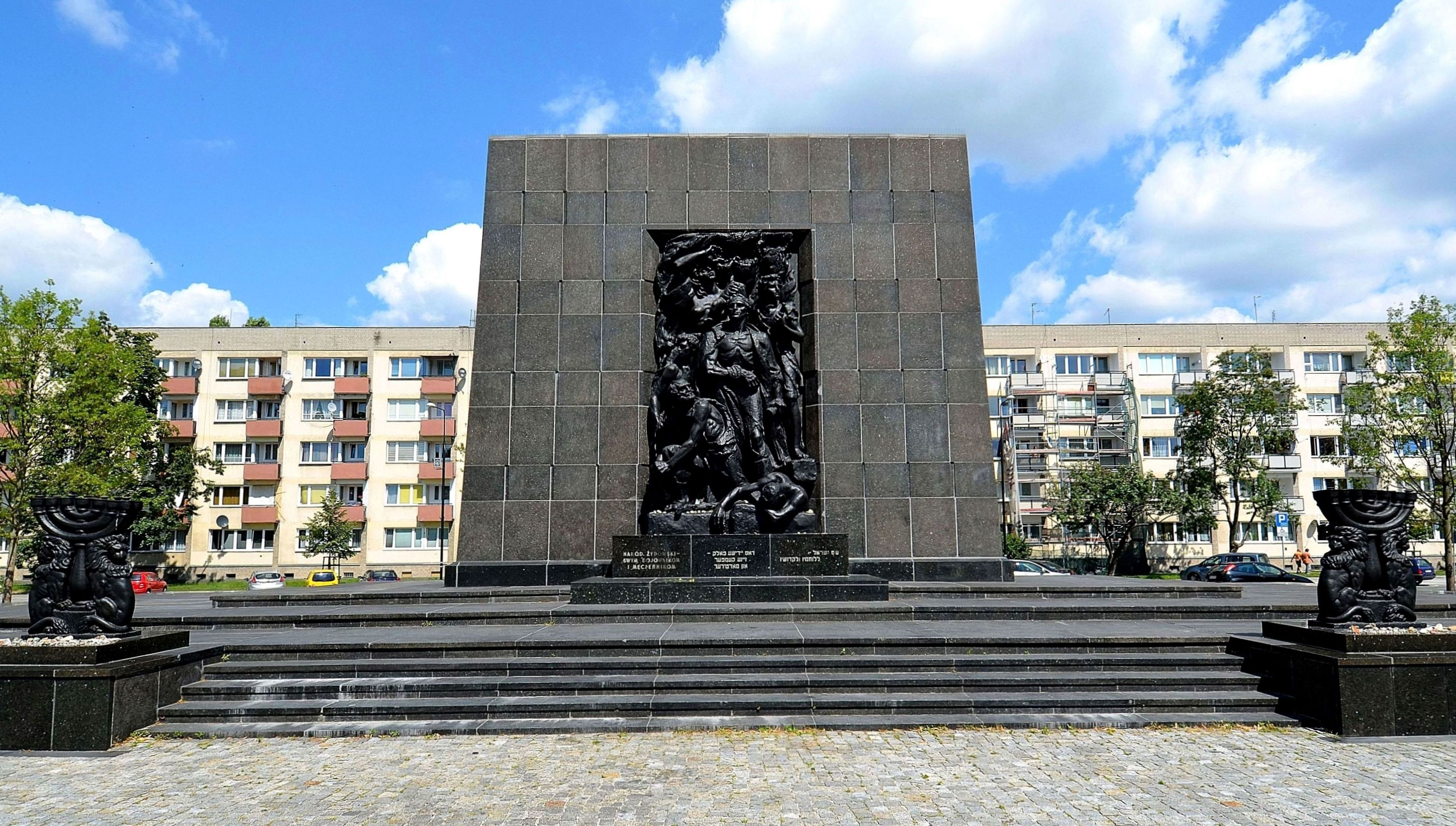
- Monument to the Ghetto Heroes, western side
- Interactive map of Monument to the Ghetto Heroes
- Location: Muranów, Warsaw, Poland
- Coordinates: 52°14′59″N 20°59′38″E
- Designer: Nathan Rapoport, Leon Suzin
- Material: bronze and stone
- Beginning date: 1946
- Completion date: 1948
- Opening date: 16 April 1946
- Dedicated date: 19 April 1948
- Dedicated to: Warsaw Ghetto

The Monument to the Ghetto Heroes (Polish: Pomnik Bohaterów Getta) is a monument in Warsaw, Poland, commemorating the Warsaw Ghetto Uprising of 1943 during the Second World War. It is located in the area which was formerly a part of the Warsaw Ghetto, at the spot where the first armed clash of the uprising took place.

The monument was built partly of Nazi German materials originally brought to Warsaw in 1942 by Albert Speer for his planned works. The completed monument was formally unveiled in April 1948.

== History and description ==
The monument was raised in the square bordered by Anielewicza Street, Karmelicka Street, Lewartowskiego Street and Zamenhofa Street. From August 1942 until the end of the Warsaw ghetto this was the last location of the Judenrat. The site also witnessed several clashes between the Warsaw Ghetto Jewish partisans and the German and auxiliary troops.

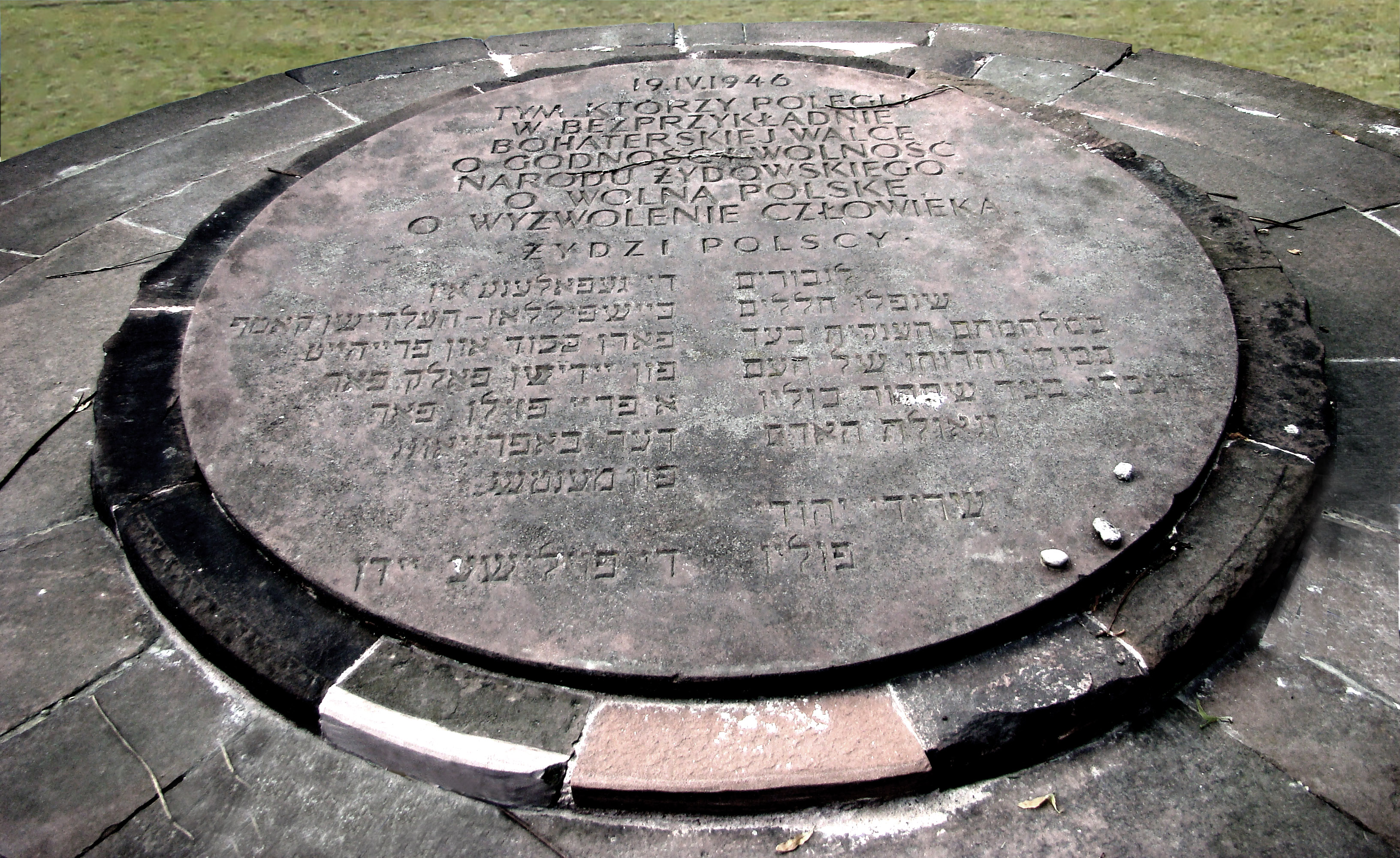
1946 memorial tablet

=== Suzin plaque ===
The decision to build a monument to the ghetto partisans was made as early as in 1944, by the Central Committee of Polish Jews in Lublin. The monument was designed by Leon Suzin. The first part of the monument, a small memorial tablet, was unveiled on April 16, 1946; the plaque was in the shape of a circle, with a palm leaf, a Hebrew letter "B" ב, and a Hebrew, Polish and Yiddish inscription: "For those who fell in an unprecedented and heroic struggle for the dignity and freedom of the Jewish people, for a free Poland, and for the liberation of mankind. Polish Jews". It was also decided to build a larger monument in the future.

=== Rapoport monument ===
The new, larger monument, sculpted by Nathan Rapoport (who worked under the supervision of Suzin), was unveiled on April 19, 1948. The monument stands 11 meters (36 ft) tall. As Rapoport himself explained, the "wall" of the monument was designed to evoke not just the ghetto walls, but also the Western Wall ("Wailing Wall") in Jerusalem. The great stones would thus have "framed the memory of events in Warsaw in the iconographic figure of Judaism's holiest site". The labradorite stone used in parts of the monument comes from German supplies, ordered by Albert Speer in 1942 for planned Nazi German monuments.

The western part of the monument shows a bronze group sculpture of insurgents - men, women and children, armed with guns and Molotov cocktails. The central standing figure of this frieze is that of Mordechai Anielewicz (1919 – 8 May 1943), the leader of Żydowska Organizacja Bojowa (ŻOB; English: Jewish Combat Organization) during the uprising. (Note: Anielewicz was instrumental in the first act of the Warsaw Ghetto Uprising, preventing the majority of a second wave of Jews from being deported to extermination camps. This initial incident of armed resistance was a prelude to the Warsaw Ghetto Uprising that commenced on 19 April 1943. Though there were no surviving eyewitnesses, it is assumed that he killed himself on 8 May 1943, along with many of his staff, in a mass suicide at the surrounded ŻOB command post at 18 Miła Street. His body was never found; nevertheless, the inscription on the obelisk at the site of the Miła 18 bunker states that he is buried there.)

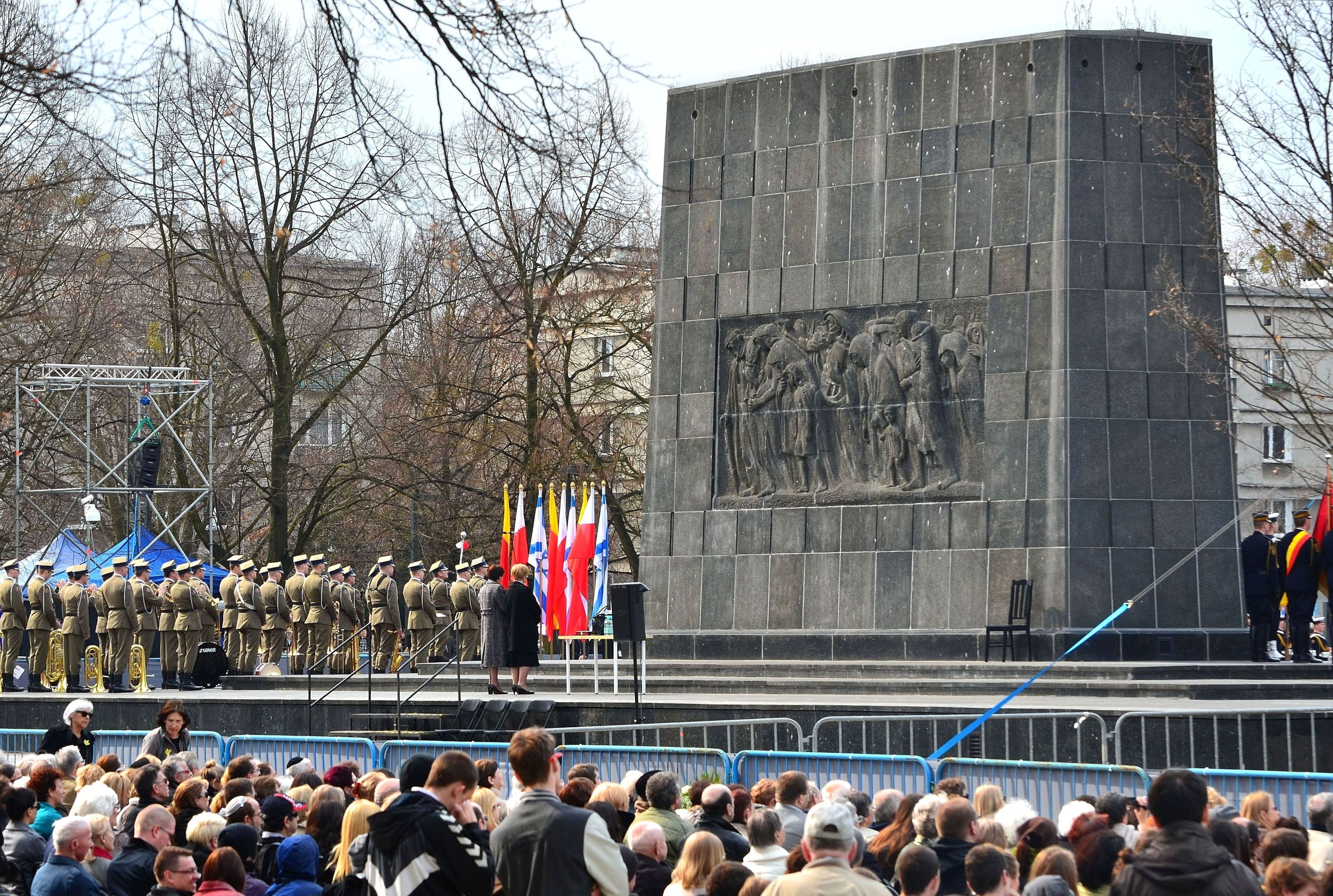
Eastern side of the monument

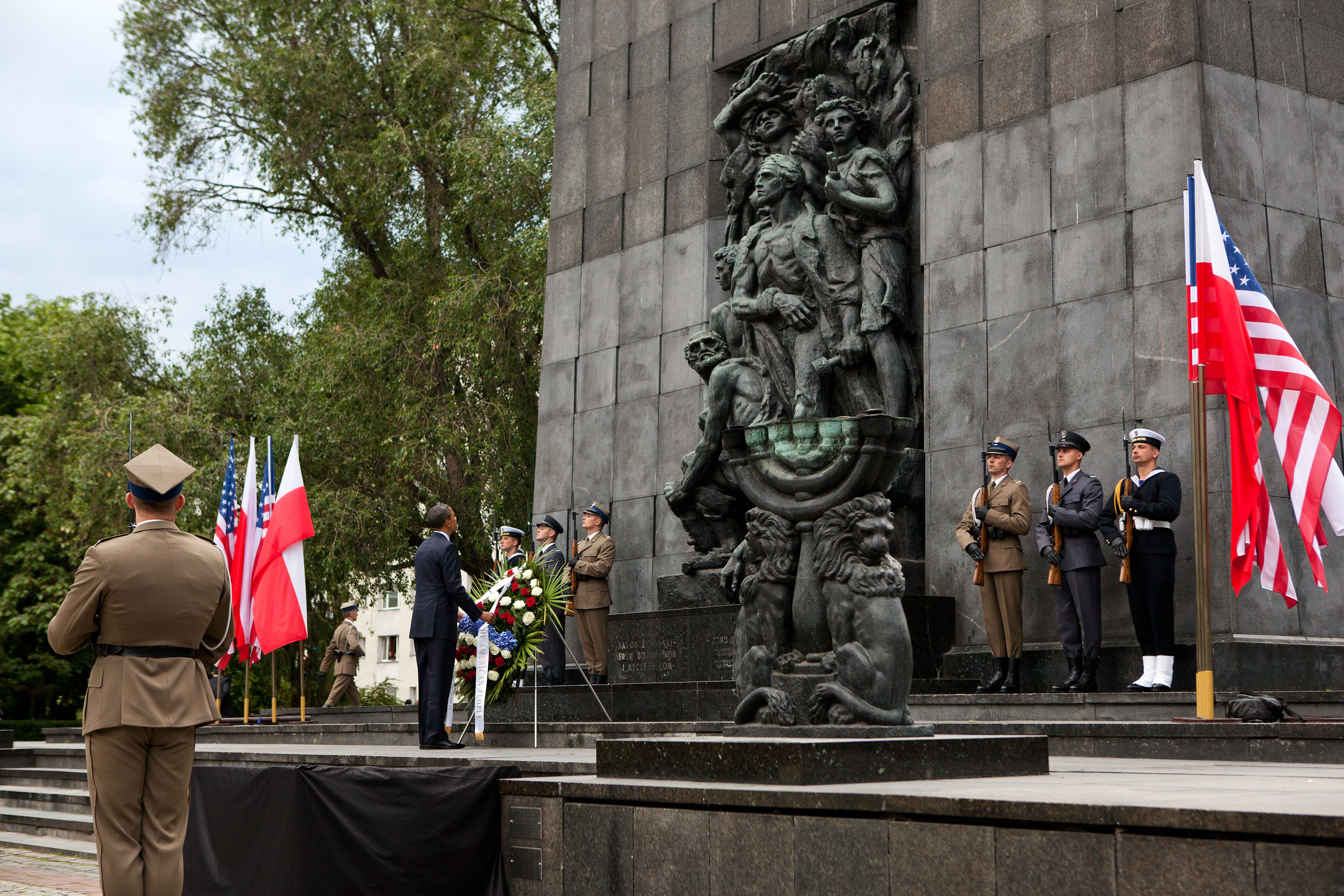
President Barack Obama at the monument during his visit to Poland, May 27, 2011

The eastern part of the monument shows the persecution of Jews at the hands of the Nazi German oppressors. The monument has a three-language sign: "Jewish nation to its fighters and martyrs."

== Commemoration-related events ==
The Warschauer Kniefall (German for "Warsaw kneeling") by Willy Brandt took place in front of the monument in 1970, when Brandt was the Chancellor of West Germany.

The Museum of the History of Polish Jews located opposite the monument was opened in April 2013.
