= Giv'at Ye'arim =

Moshav in central Israel

Giv'at Ye'arim: גִּבְעַת יְעָרִים (Hebrew); جڤعات يعاريم (Arabic)
- Etymology: Hill of Forests
- Location within Jerusalem District
- Coordinates: 31°47′14″N 35°5′20″E
- Country: Israel
- District: Jerusalem
- Council: Mateh Yehuda
- Affiliation: Moshavim Movement
- Founded: 1950
- Founder: Immigrants from Yemen
- Population (2024): 1,271

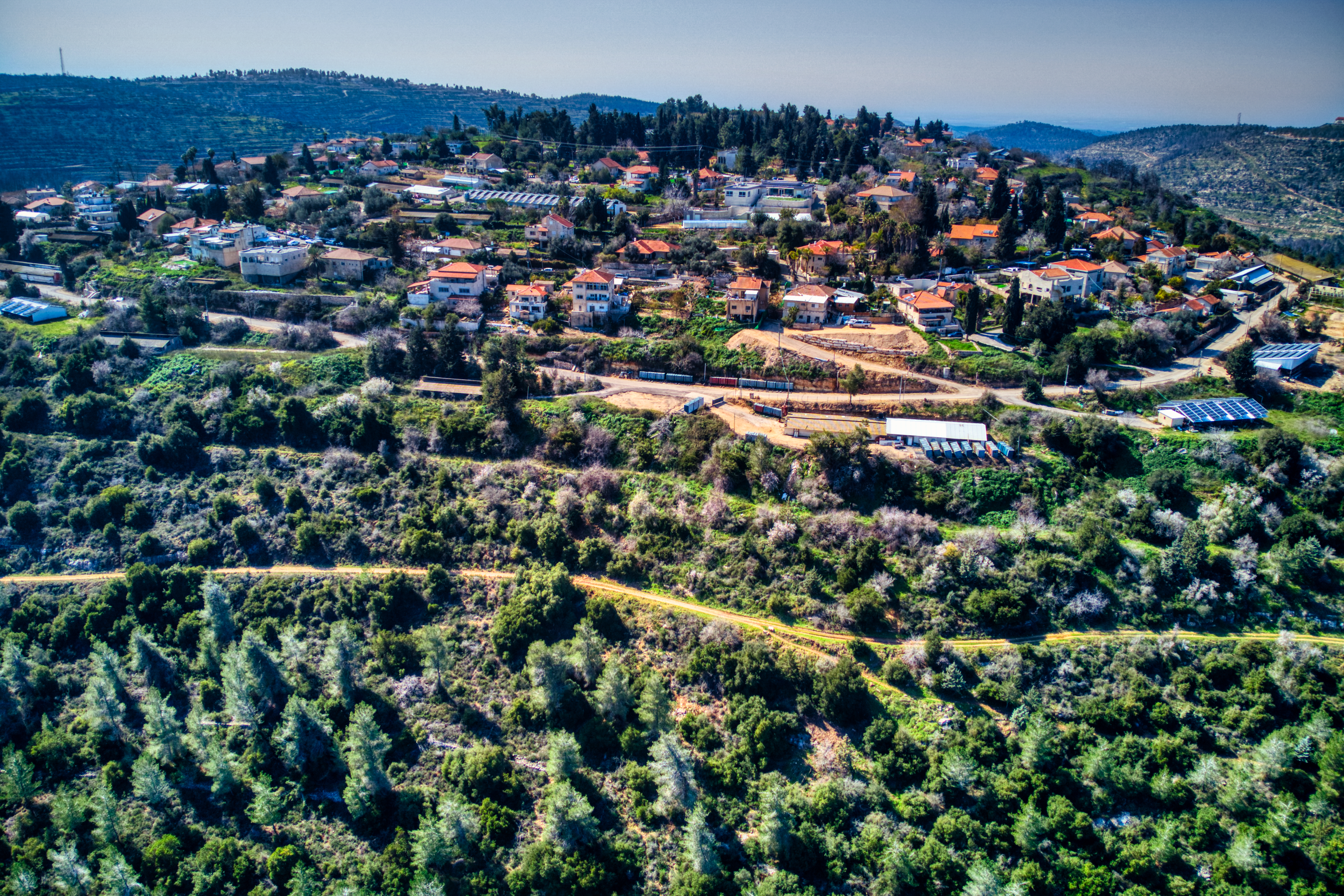

Giv'at Ye'arim (Hebrew: גִּבְעַת יְעָרִים, lit. Hill of Forests) is a semi-cooperative moshav in central Israel. Located in the Judean Mountains, it falls under the jurisdiction of Mateh Yehuda Regional Council. In 2024 it had a population of 1,271.

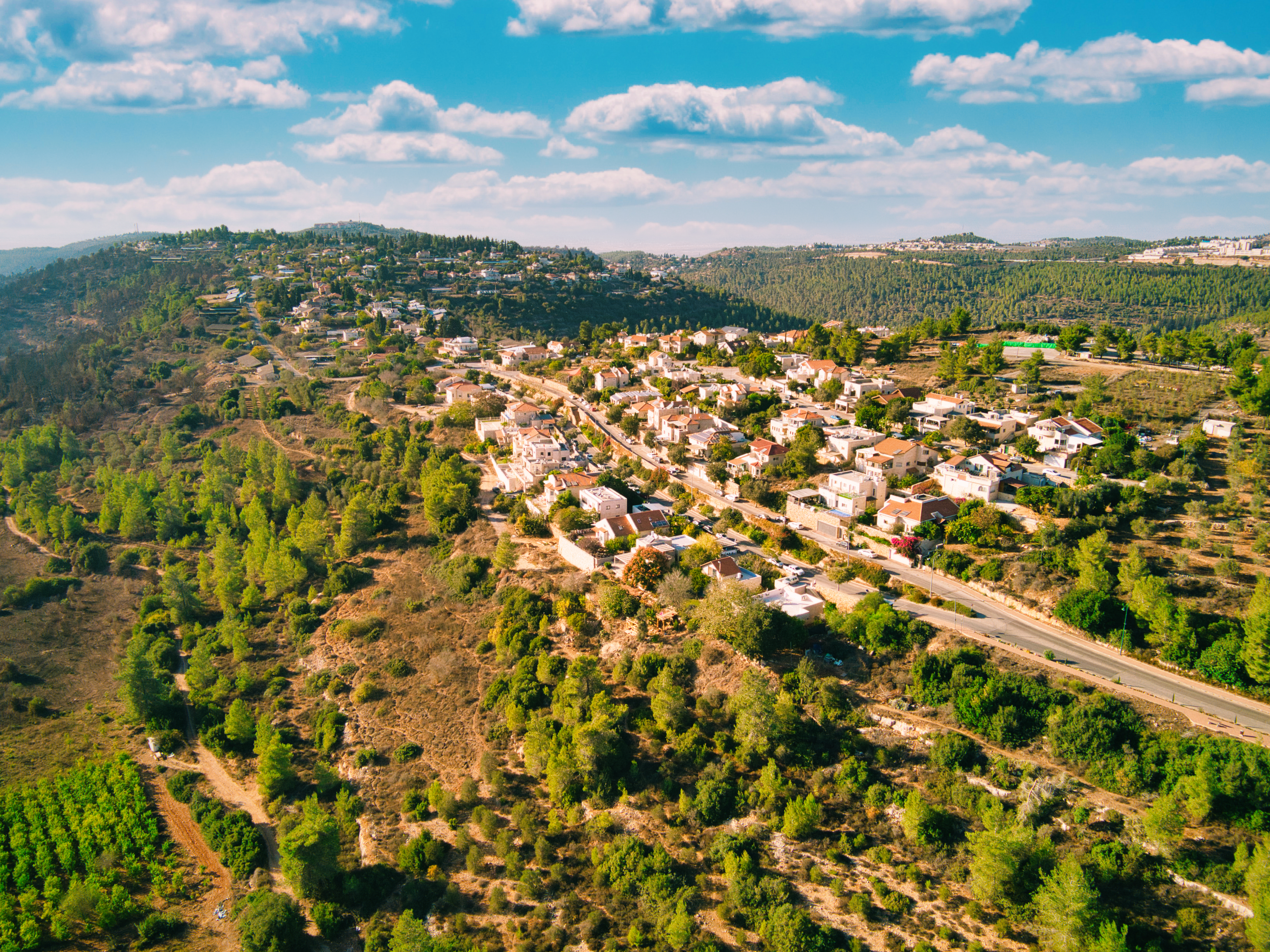
Giv'at Ye'arim

== History ==
The moshav was founded in 1950 by Yemenite immigrants, on the land of the depopulated Palestinian village of Khirbat al-'Umur.

Giv'at Ye'arim is assumed to be the site of Gibeath, a city mentioned in the Book of Joshua (18:28).

In the past, the majority of Giv'at Ye'arim residents worked in agriculture, particularly viticulture and poultry-breeding. Today, many hold jobs outside the moshav, mainly in Jerusalem and Mevaseret Zion.
