= Nahal Kesalon =

Wadi in West Bank and Israel

Coordinates: 31°47′N 35°02′E

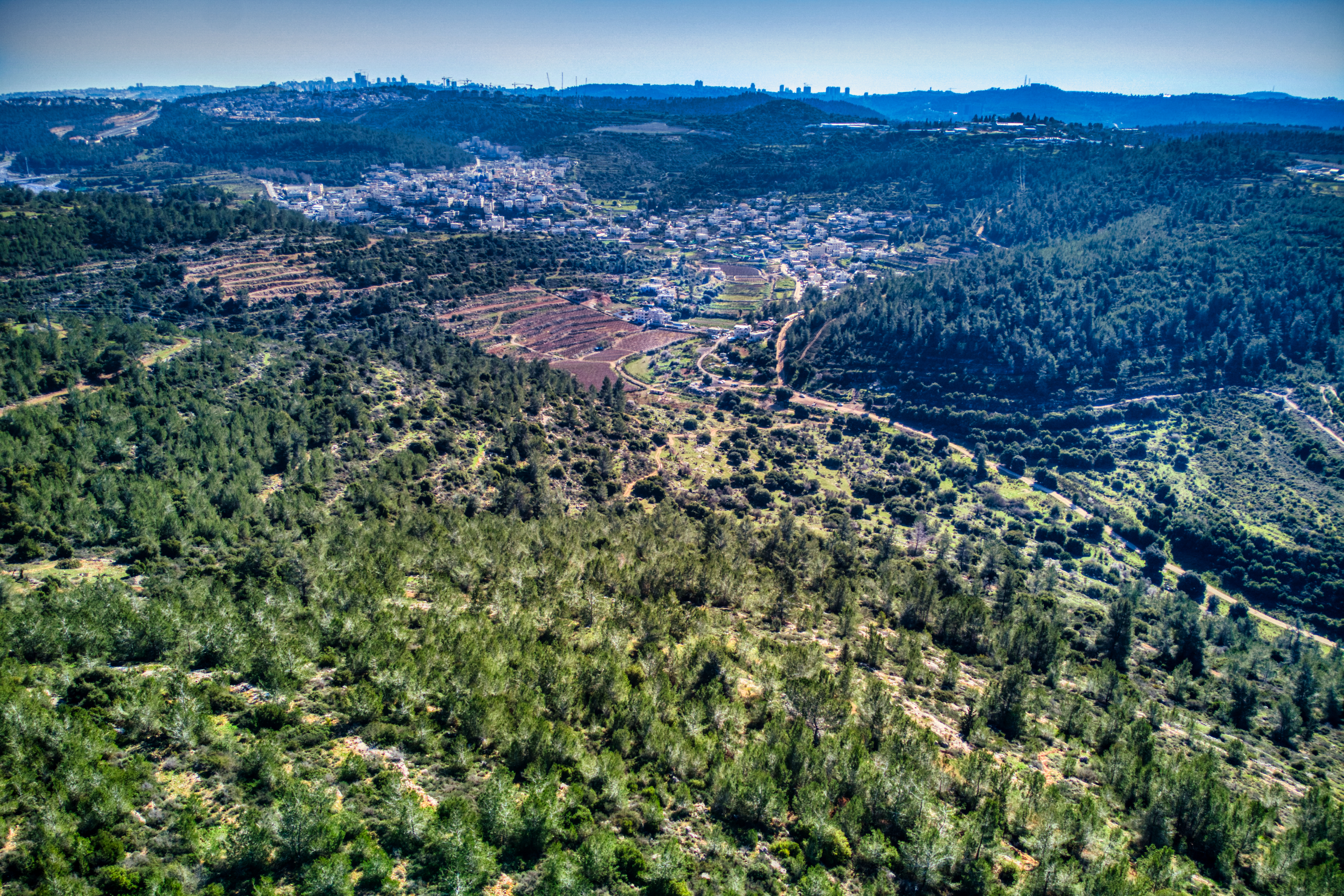
Nahal Kesalon

Nahal Kesalon or Nahal Ksalon (Hebrew: נחל כסלון) or Wadi el-Ghadir (Note: There are a number of other wadis named el-Ghahir, al-Ghadir, el Ghadeer, etc.) (Arabic: وادي الغدير) is a wadi in West Bank and Israel in the Jerusalem corridor. Its source is in the Judaean Mountains east of Har Adar and drain in Nahal Sorek near Beit Shemesh.

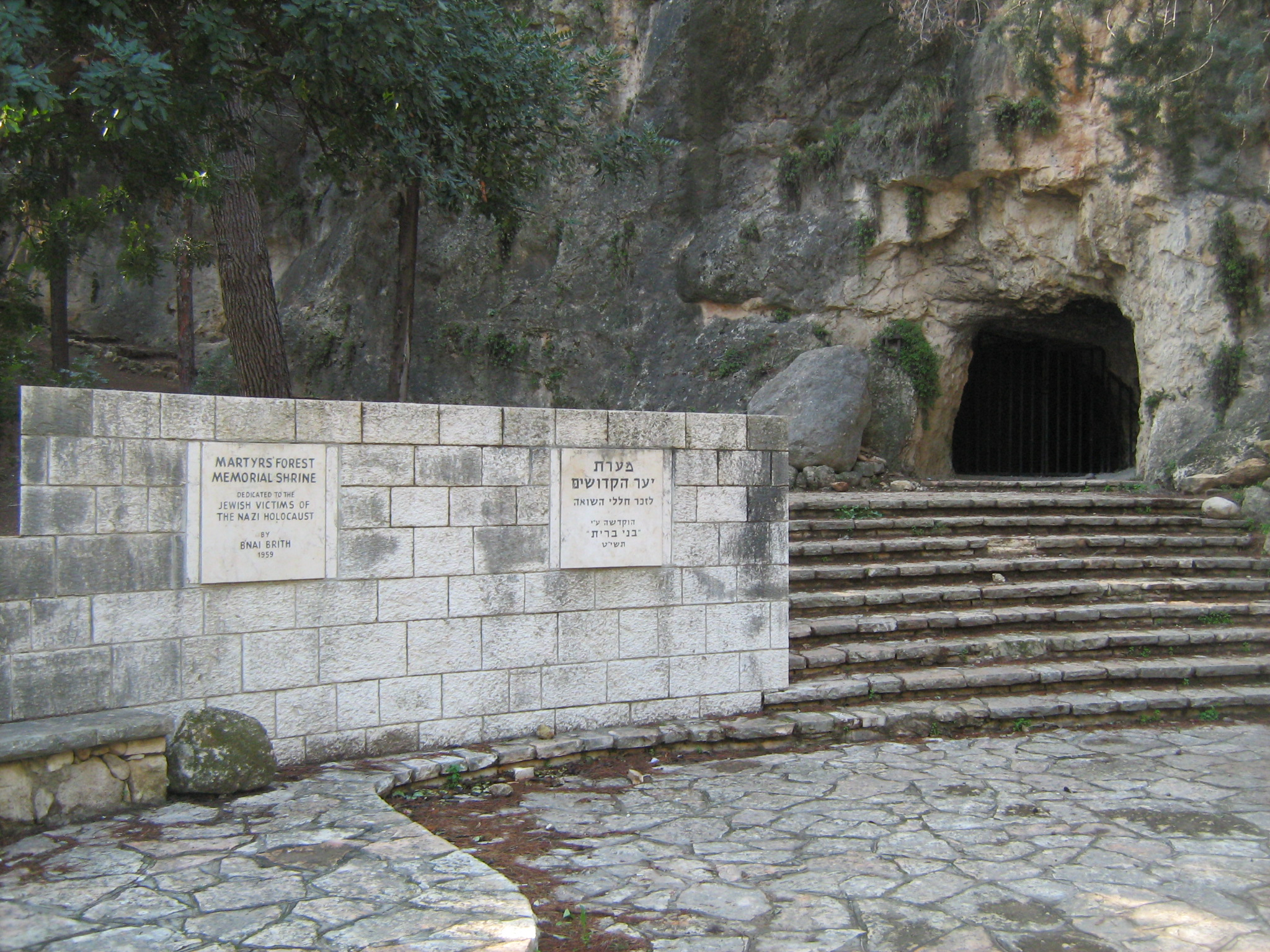
B'nai Brith Cave

It is included in the Israel National Trail, an Israel-wide hiking trail. It flows through the Ein Hemed national park. In its lower reaches it passes through the Forest of the Martyrs, planted as a memorial to the Holocaust victims.
