= Nathan Rapoport =

Polish-born Israeli-American sculptor and painter

Nathan Rapoport נתן רפופורט
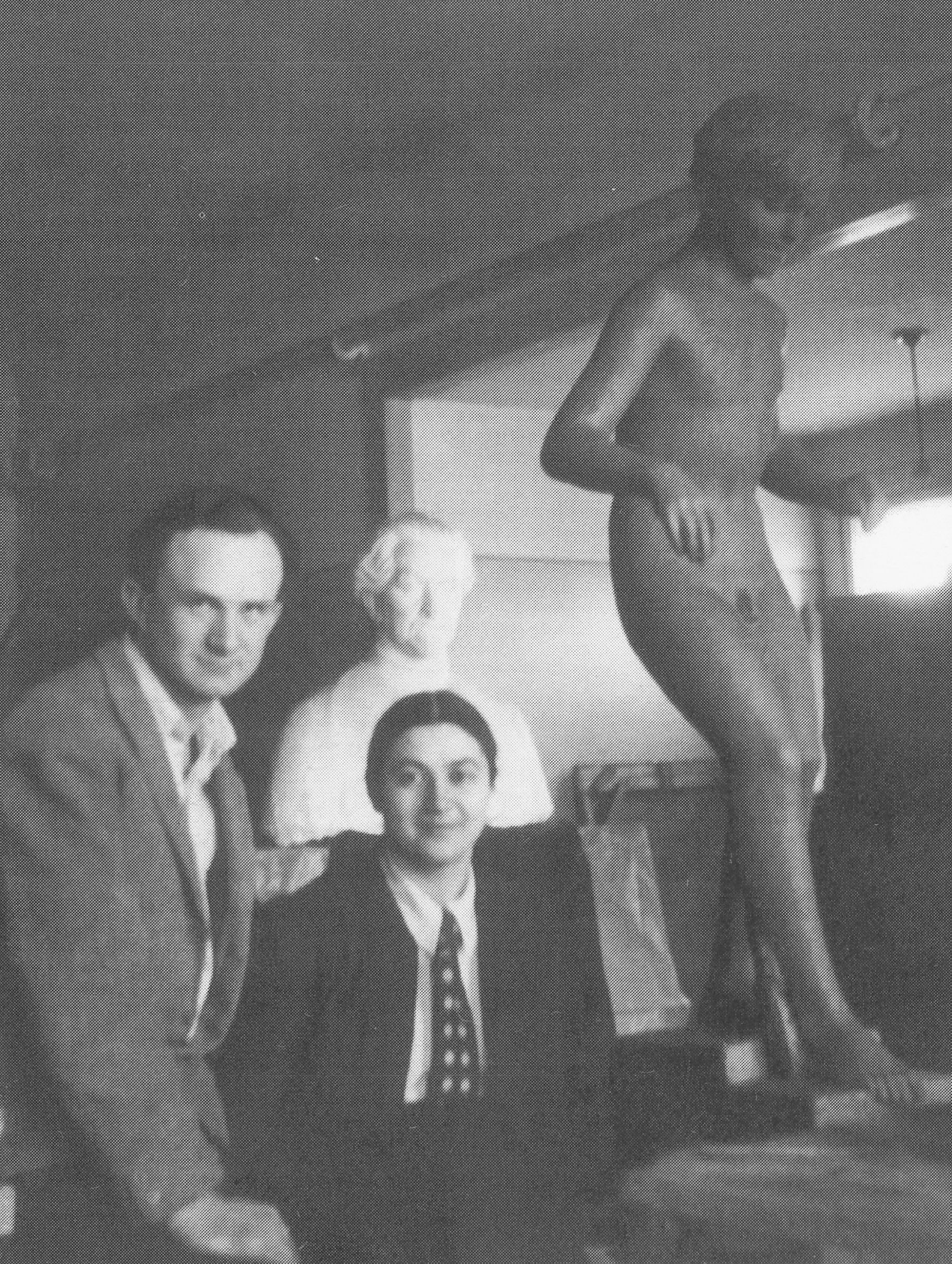
- Natan Rapoport with his wife Sima in his Warsaw studio (1937)
- Born: November 7, 1911; Warsaw, Congress Poland
- Died: June 4, 1987 (aged 75); New York City, U.S.
- Education: Academy of Fine Arts, Warsaw
- Known for: Sculpture
- Notable work: Monument to the Ghetto Heroes, Scroll of Fire

Nathan Rapoport (Hebrew: נתן רפופורט; 1911–1987) was a Warsaw-born Jewish sculptor and painter, later a resident of Israel and then the United States.

== Biography ==
Natan Yaakov Rapoport was born in Warsaw, Poland. In 1936, he won a scholarship to study in France and Italy. He fled to the Soviet Union when the Nazi Germans invaded Poland. The Soviets initially provided him with a studio but then forced him to work as a manual laborer. When the war ended, he returned to Poland to study at the Academy of Fine Arts in Warsaw and immigrated to Israel. In 1959, he moved to the United States. He lived in New York City until his death in 1987.

== Monumental art ==
His sculptures in public places, with the year they were installed in, include:

- Monument to the Ghetto Heroes (1948), bronze, Warsaw, Poland
- Memorial to the Warsaw Ghetto Uprising (1976), bronze, at Yad Vashem, Jerusalem; a slightly modified replica of the Warsaw monument
  - The Warsaw Ghetto Uprising, bronze
  - The Last March, bronze
- Monument to Mordechai Anielewicz (1951), at Kibbutz Yad Mordechai, Israel
- Monument to Six Million Jewish Martrys (1964), at the Horwitz-Wasserman Holocaust Memorial Plaza on Benjamin Franklin Parkway, Philadelphia, PA.
- Scroll of Fire (1971) in the Forest of the Martyrs near Jerusalem
- Liberation (Holocaust memorial) (1985), bronze, Liberty State Park, Jersey City, New Jersey
- Korczak's Last Walk at the Park Avenue Synagogue, New York, NY.
- Ghetto Square Monument at Yad Vashem, Jerusalem, Israel. https://www.yadvashem.org/articles/general/warsaw-memorial-personal-interpretation.html

== Gallery ==
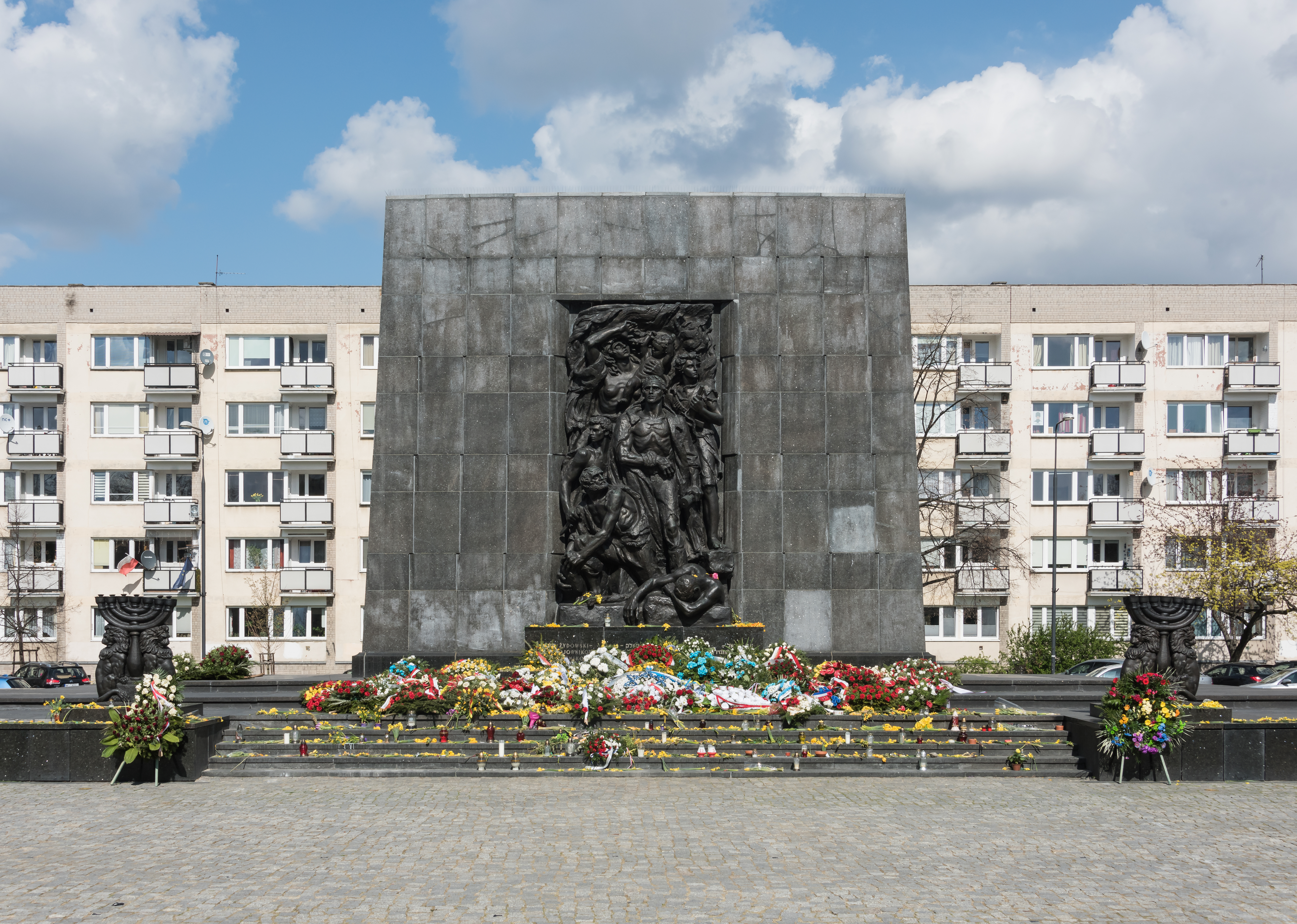
Monument to the Ghetto Heroes (1948) in Warsaw, west side

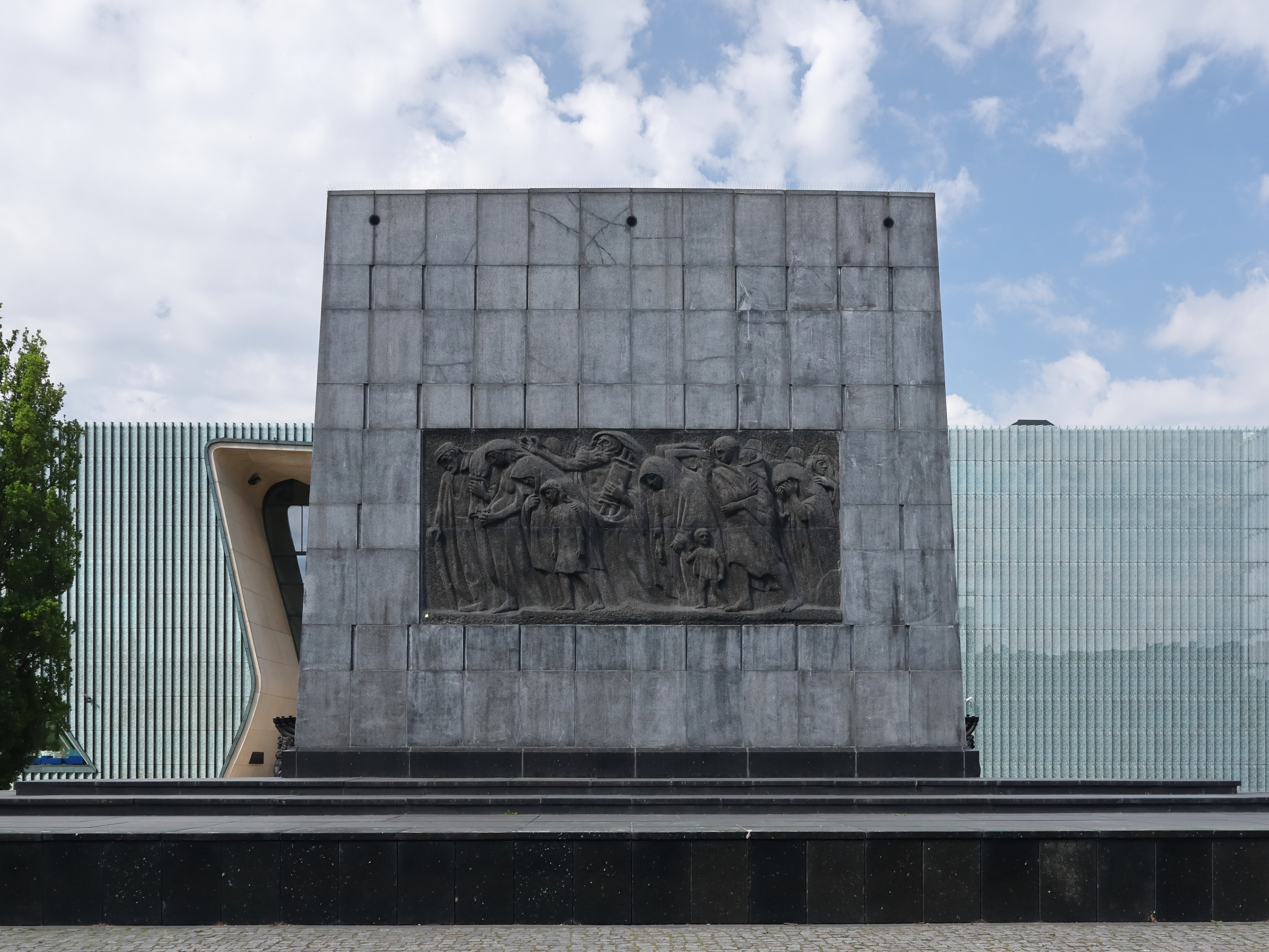
Warsaw monument, east side

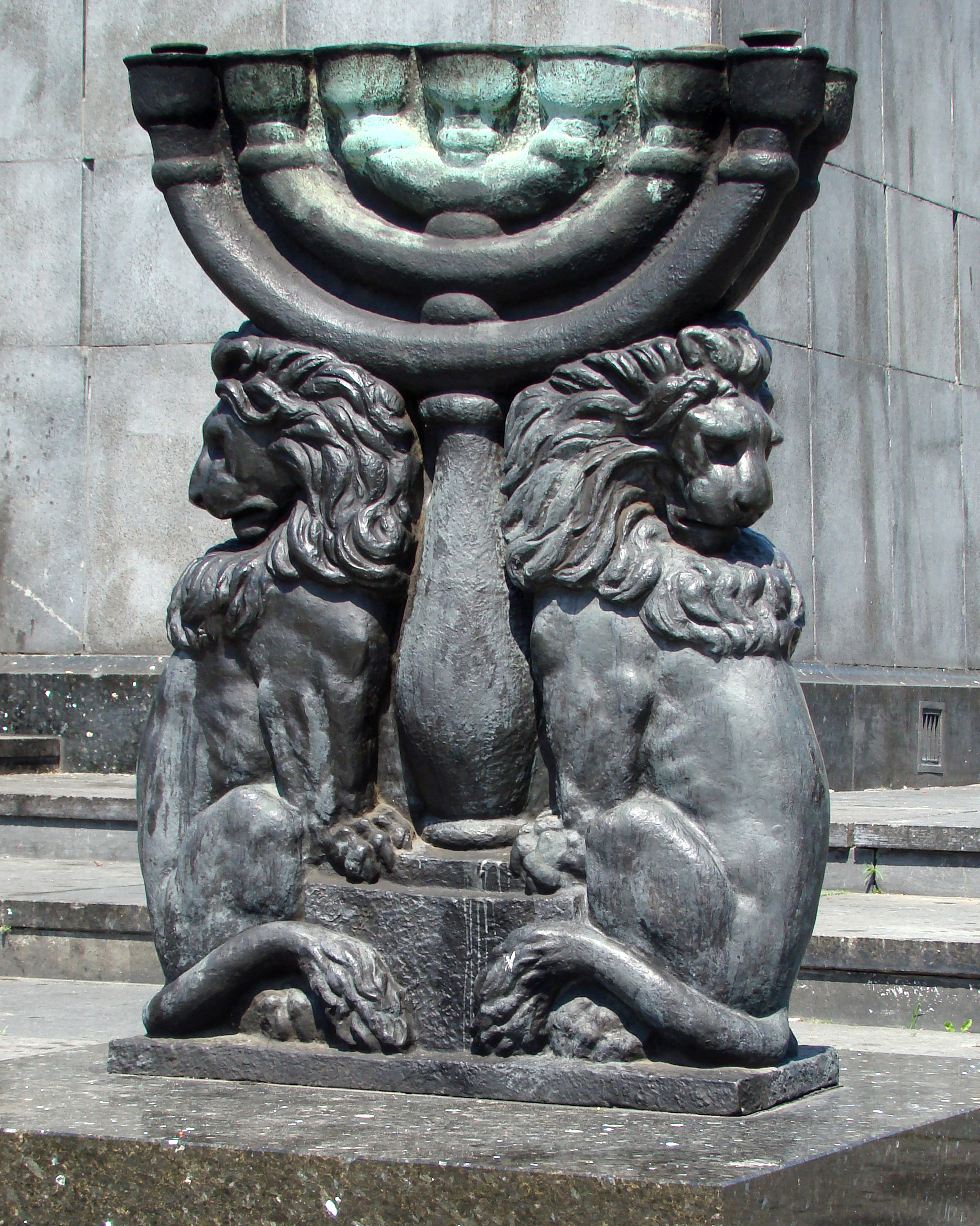
Menorah from the Warsaw monument

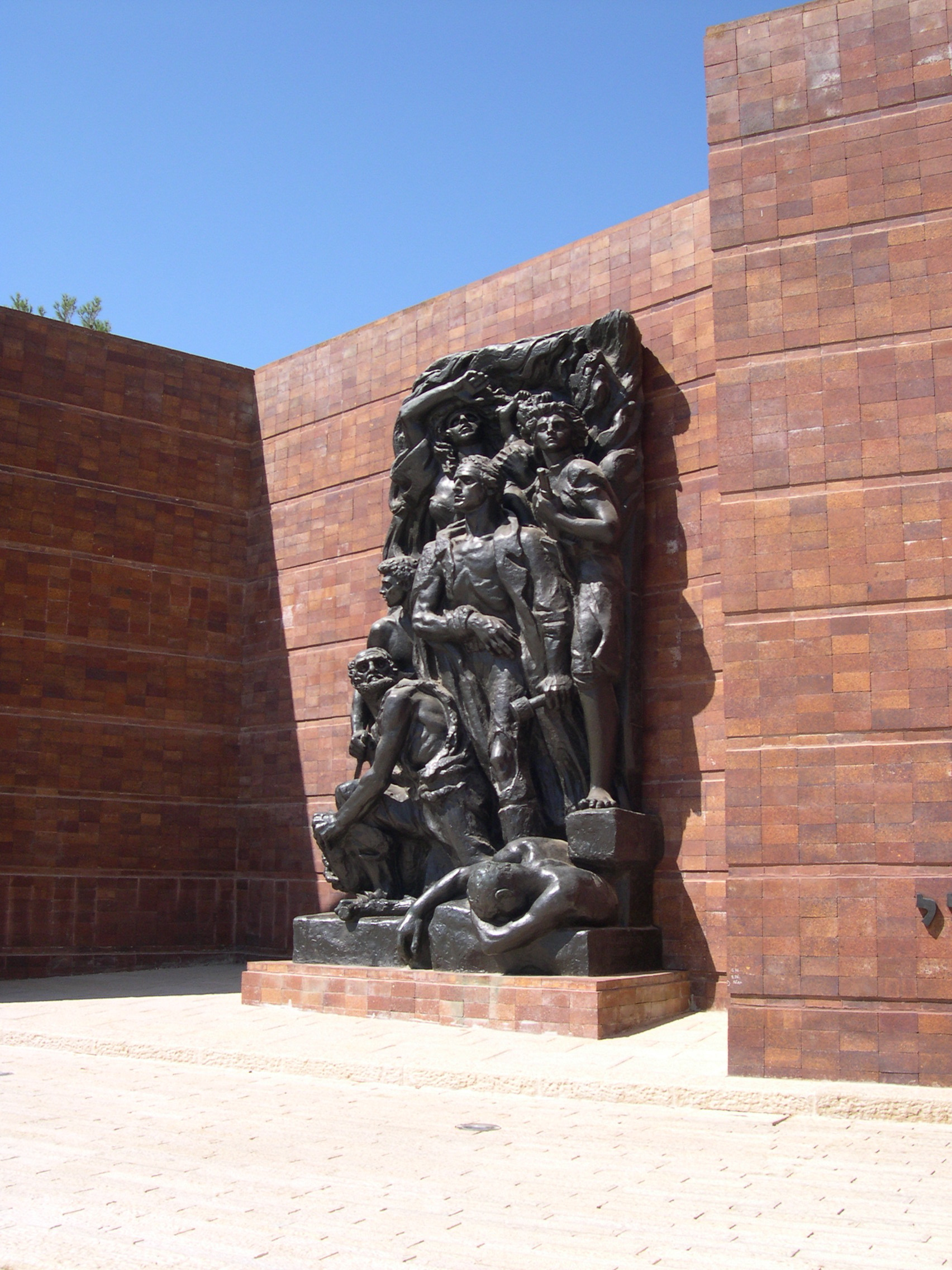
The Warsaw Ghetto Uprising (1976), bronze, Yad Vashem, Jerusalem, Israel

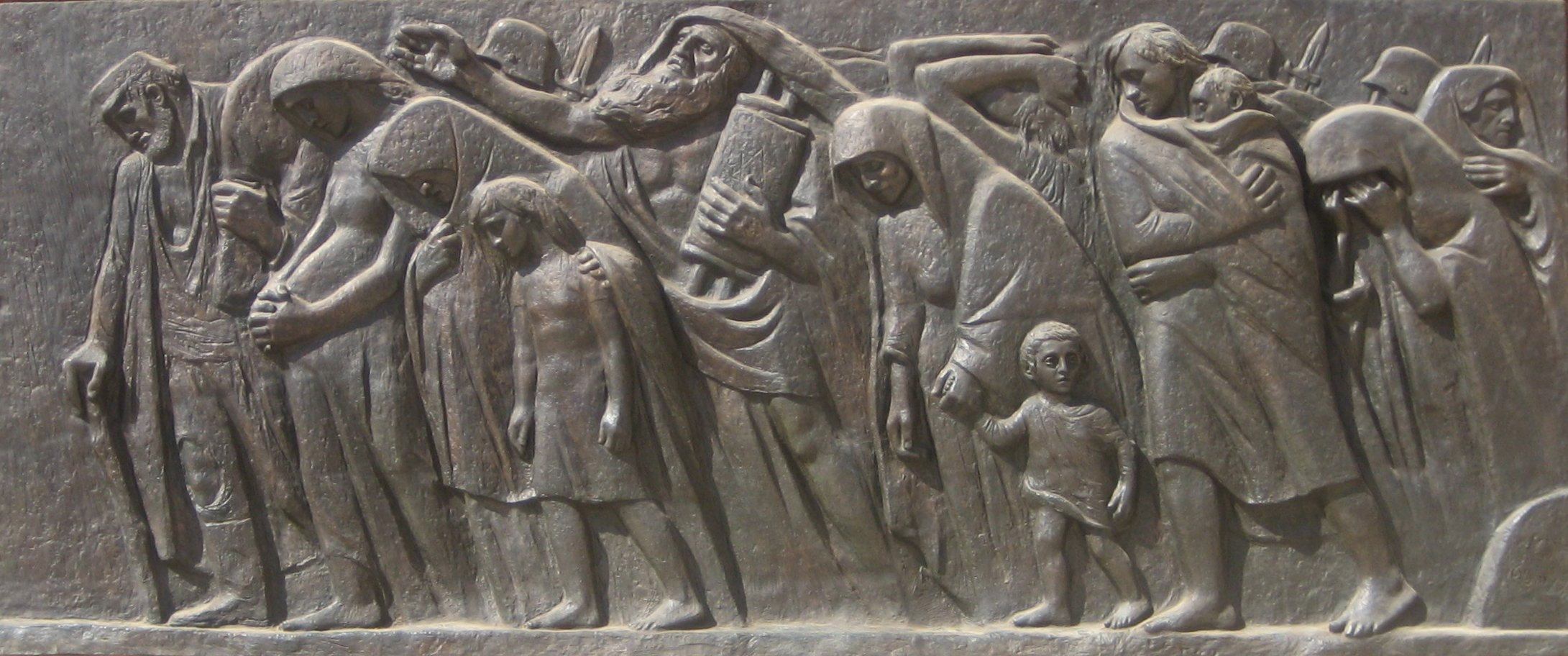
The Last March (1976), bronze, part of the Yad Vashem memorial to the Warsaw Ghetto Uprising

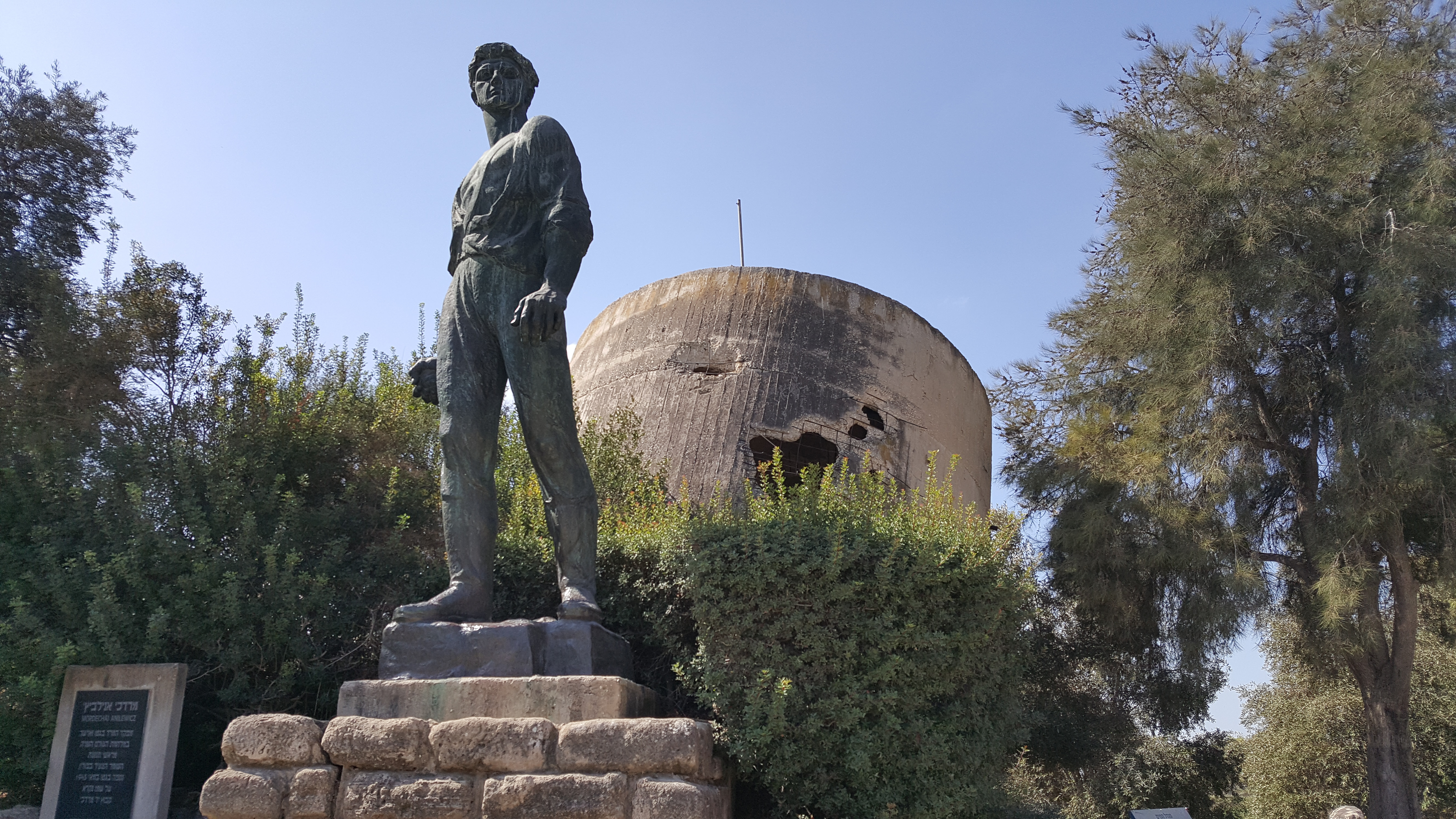
Monument to Mordechai Anielewicz (1951) at Yad Mordechai, Israel

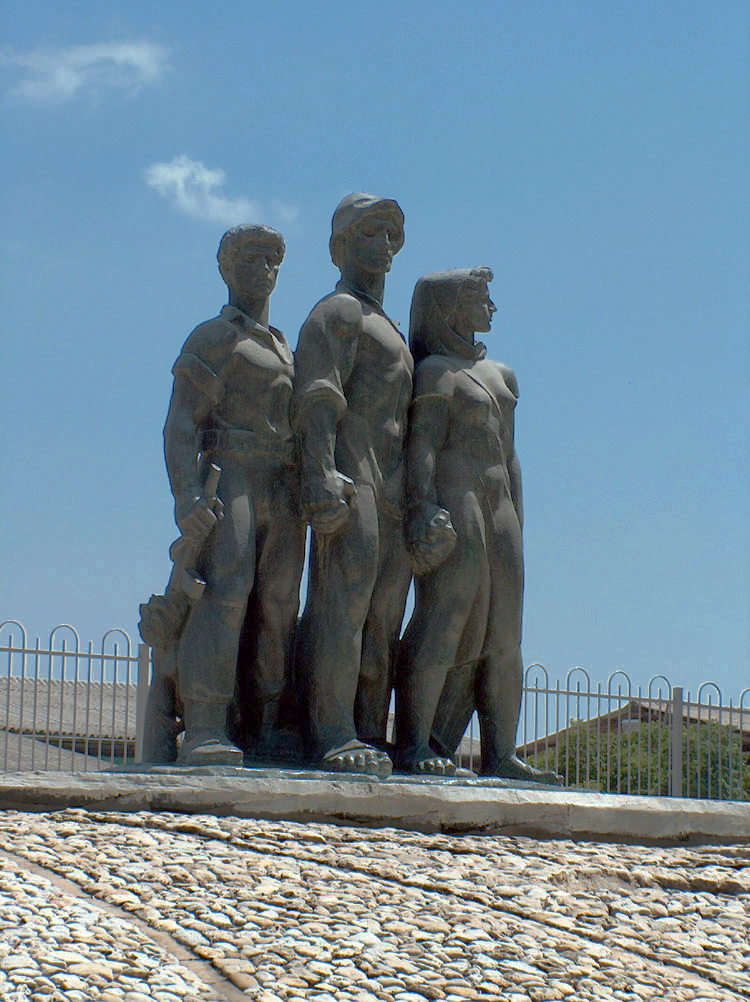
Kibbutz Negba, memorial to the participants in the 1948 battles

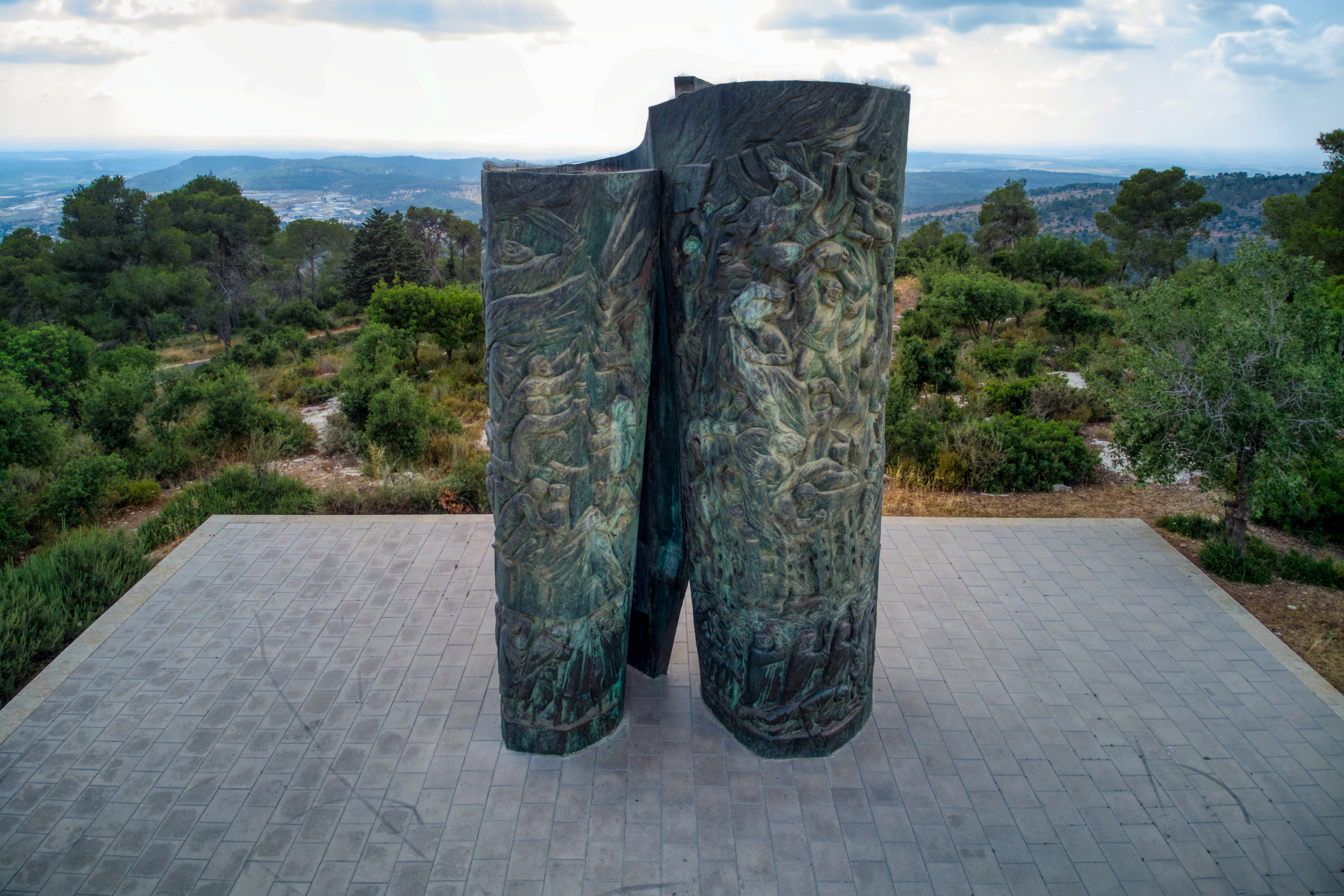
Scroll of Fire (1971), Forest of the Martyrs near Jerusalem
