= Scroll of Fire =

Coordinates: 31°46′21.7″N 35°2′36.7″E

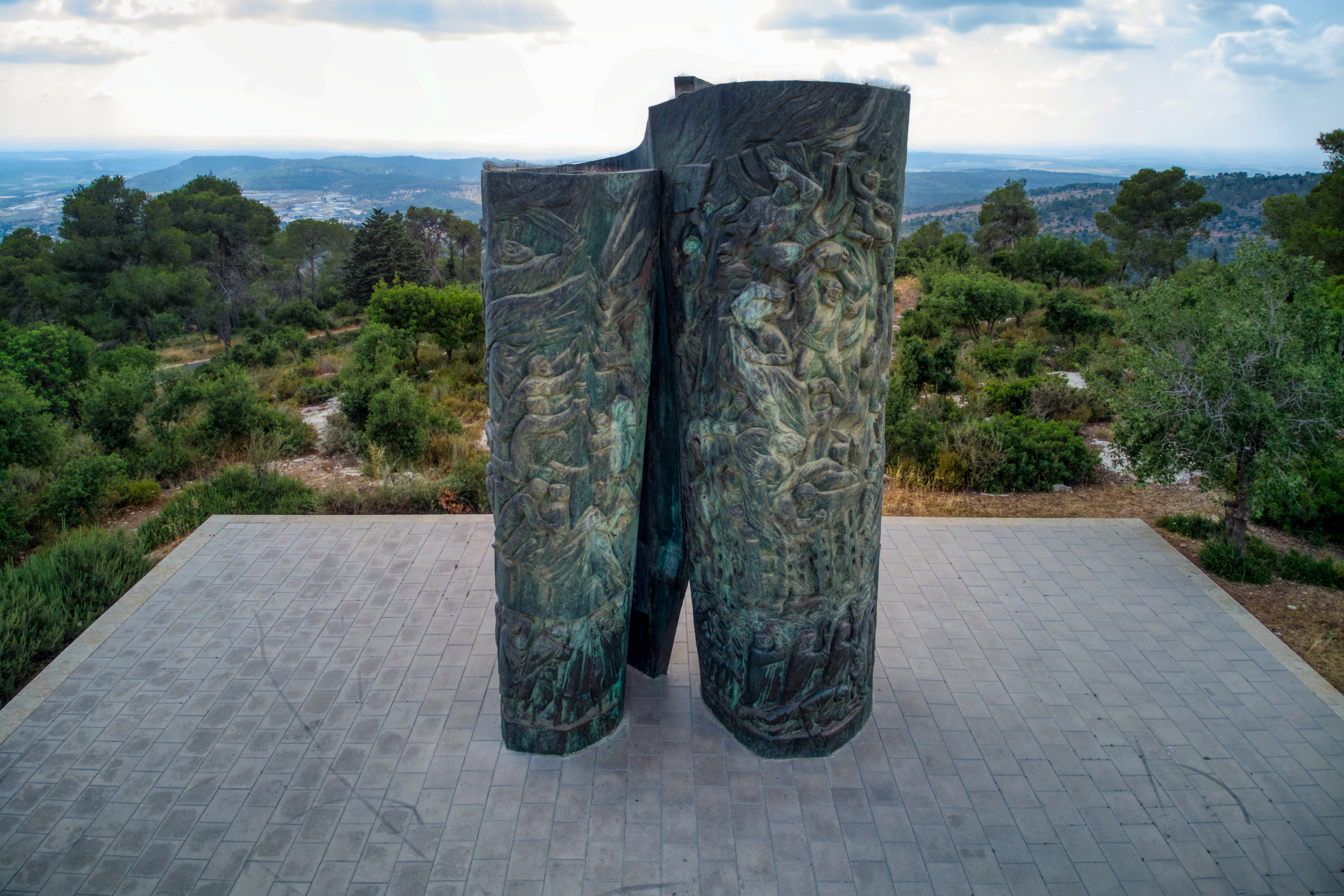
Scroll of Fire, 2023

Scroll of Fire is a monument found in the Forest of the Martyrs, on the western outskirts of Jerusalem. It commemorates Jewish history from The Holocaust until the independence of the State of Israel in 1948. The monument was inaugurated in 1971.

The initiative for the monument came from B'nai B'rith of the United States, and was funded by them. The site was chosen by Yosef Weitz, the director of the Land and Afforestation Department of the Jewish National Fund.

The monument was sculpted by the artist Nathan Rapoport, who is a Holocaust survivor.

The sculpture is made of bronze and is eight meters high. It is in the shape of two scrolls, a gesture to the Jewish nation being the "People of the Book". One of the scrolls describes the Holocaust and the other describes independence.

In the scroll depicting the Holocaust, there are sculptured among others Janusz Korczak and his children, a row of helmets symbolizing the Nazi soldiers, a member of The Ghetto Fighters holding a grenade, and other characters behind fences of concentration camps. The scroll ends with Holocaust survivors immigrating to Israel in Aliyah Bet, Israelis helping them disembark from the boats, and a Jewish man kissing the Land of Israel.

In the scroll depicting independence, there are sculptured symbols of Israel, such as: Olive trees, a child holding a cluster of grapes, a man blowing a shofar near the Western Wall, the menorah as seen on the Arch of Titus, an old character representing Elijah, people dancing Hora, and flags flying near an angel blowing a trumpet.

In the space between the two scrolls, there are two rooms of memorial, and in each one is engraved a quote from the bible.
