= Khirbat al-'Umur =

Khirbat al-'Umur خربة العمور chirbet el-'amur
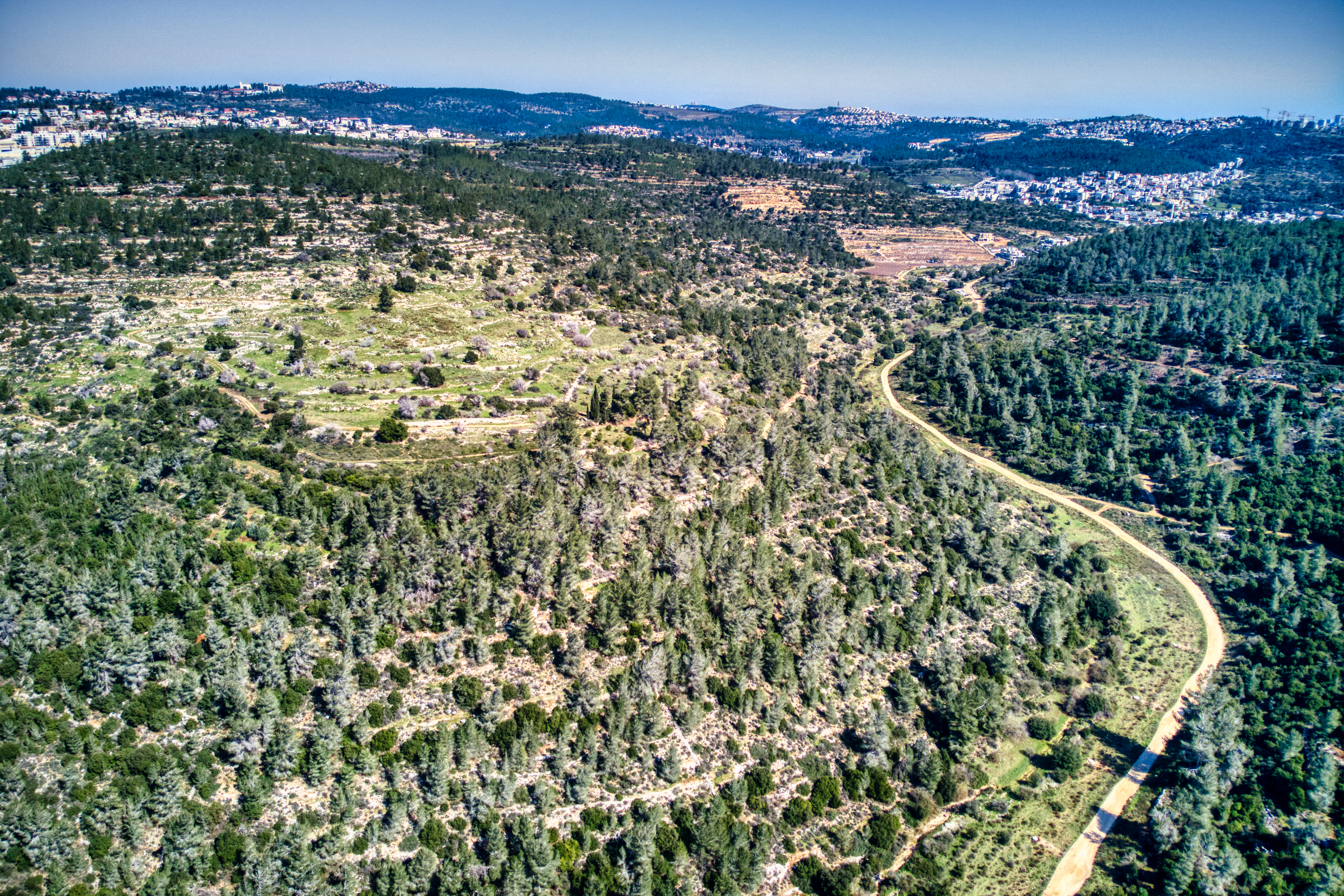
- To the left are the remains of the village (in the forest clearing on the spur), above the riverbed. Up the riverbed is the village spring and the villages of Ein Rafa and Ein Nakuba.
- Etymology: from Amorite
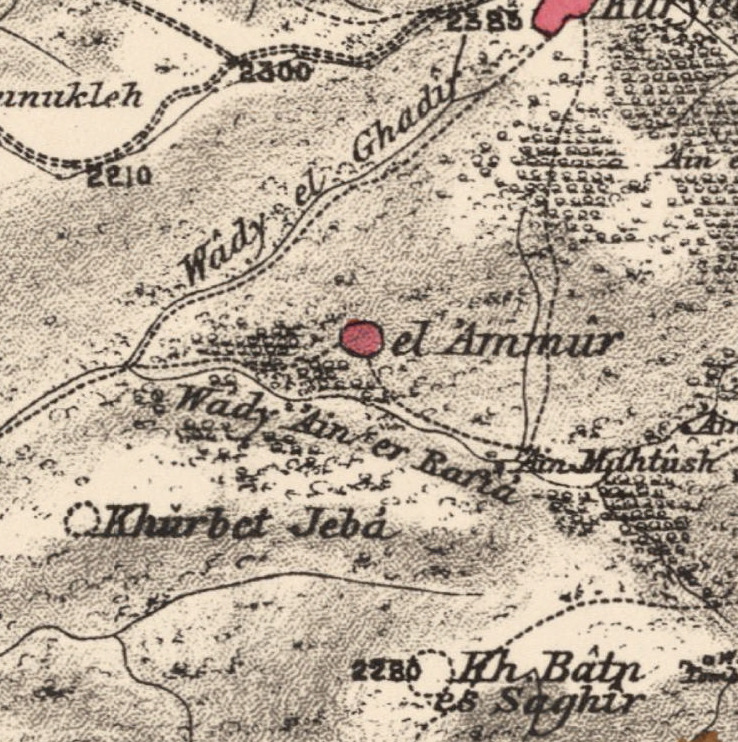
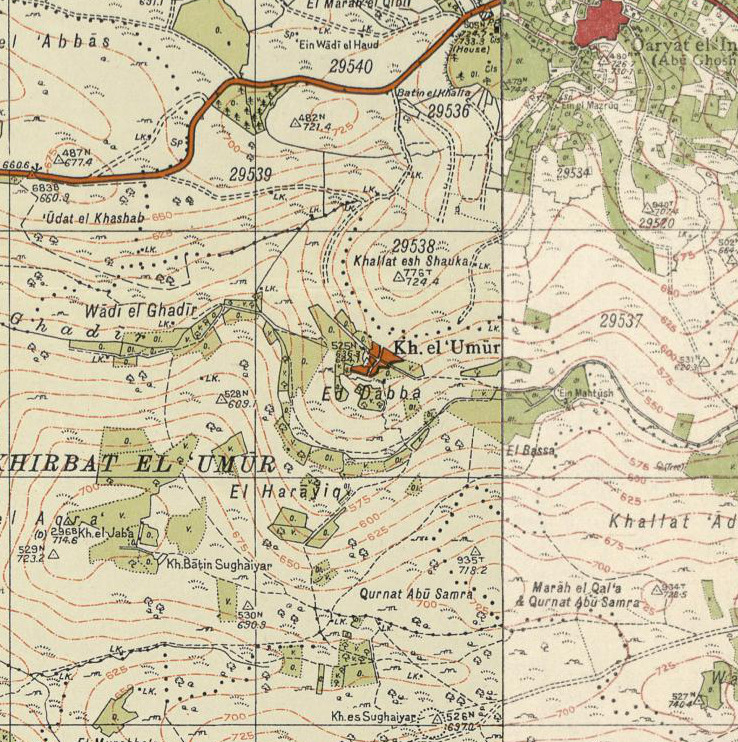
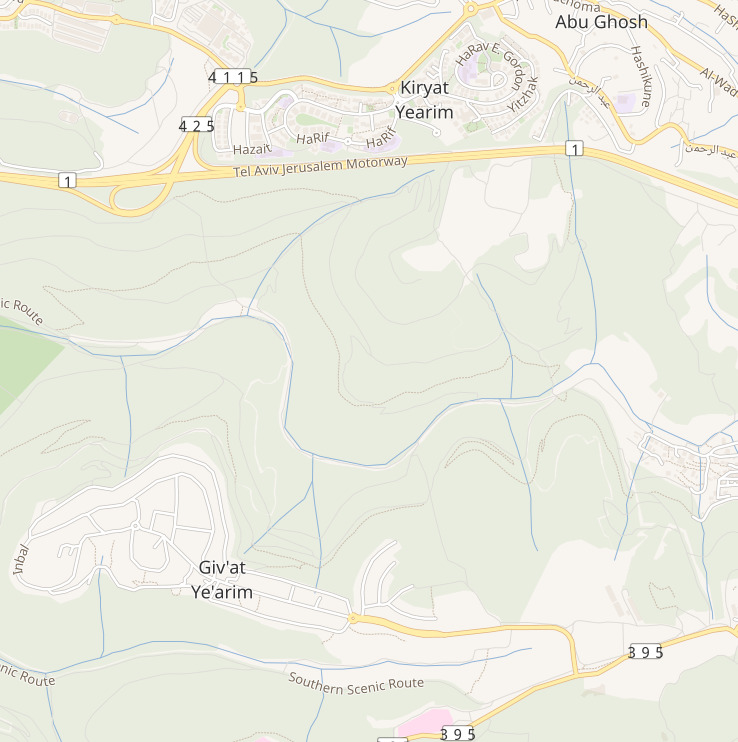
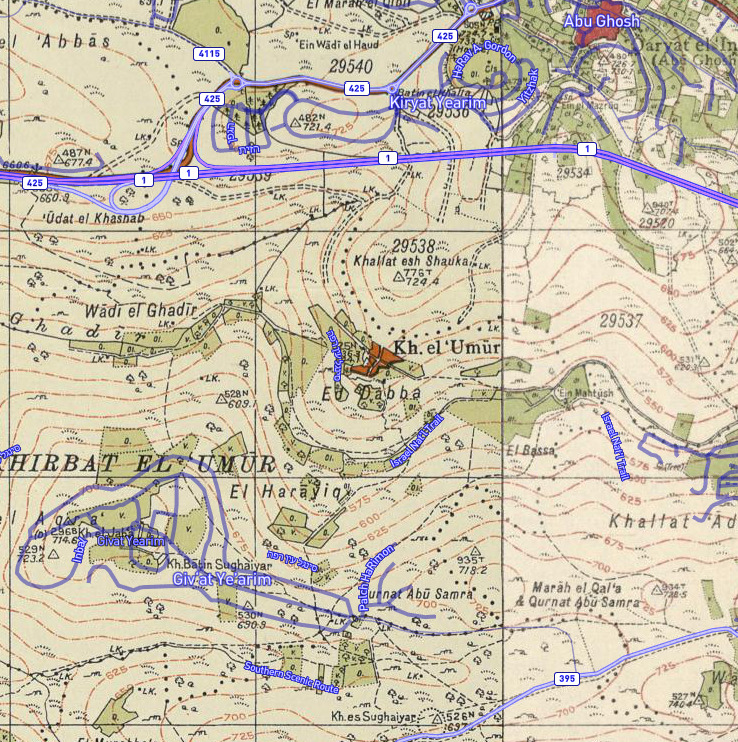
- 1870s map 1940s map modern map 1940s with modern overlay map A series of historical maps of the area around Khirbat al-'Umur (click the buttons)

- Location within Mandatory Palestine
- Coordinates: 31°47′37″N 35°05′56″E
- Palestine grid: 159/133
- Geopolitical entity: Mandatory Palestine
- Subdistrict: Jerusalem
- Date of depopulation: October 21, 1948

Area
  - Total: 4,163 dunams (4.163 km^{2}; 1.607 sq mi)

Population (1945)
  - Total: 270
- Cause(s) of depopulation: Military assault by Yishuv forces
- Current Localities: Giv'at Ye'arim

Khirbat al-'Umur was a Palestinian Arab village in the Jerusalem Subdistrict. It was depopulated during the 1948 Palestine war by the Har'el Brigade during Operation Ha-Har. It was 12 km west of Jerusalem on the Wadi al-Ghadir.

== History ==
An Ottoman village list from about 1870 showed that chirbet el-'amur had a population of 69, with a total of 13 houses, though the population count included men, only. It also noted that it was located in the District of Beni Malik, south of Abu Ghosh, and east of Saris.

In 1883, the PEF's Survey of Western Palestine (SWP) described El Ammur as "A small hamlet on the slope above a deep valley. There is a fine perennial spring below on the south ('Ain Mahtush). There are olives beneath the village."

=== British Mandate era ===
In the 1922 census of Palestine conducted by the British Mandate authorities, Kherbet al-'Amur had a population of 137 Muslims, increasing in the 1931 census to 187 Muslims, in 45 houses.

In the 1945 statistics, the village had a population of 270 Muslims, while the total land area was 4,163 dunams, according to an official land and population survey. Of this, 497 dunams were used for plantations and irrigable land, 1,279 for cereals, while 10 dunams were classified as built-up areas.

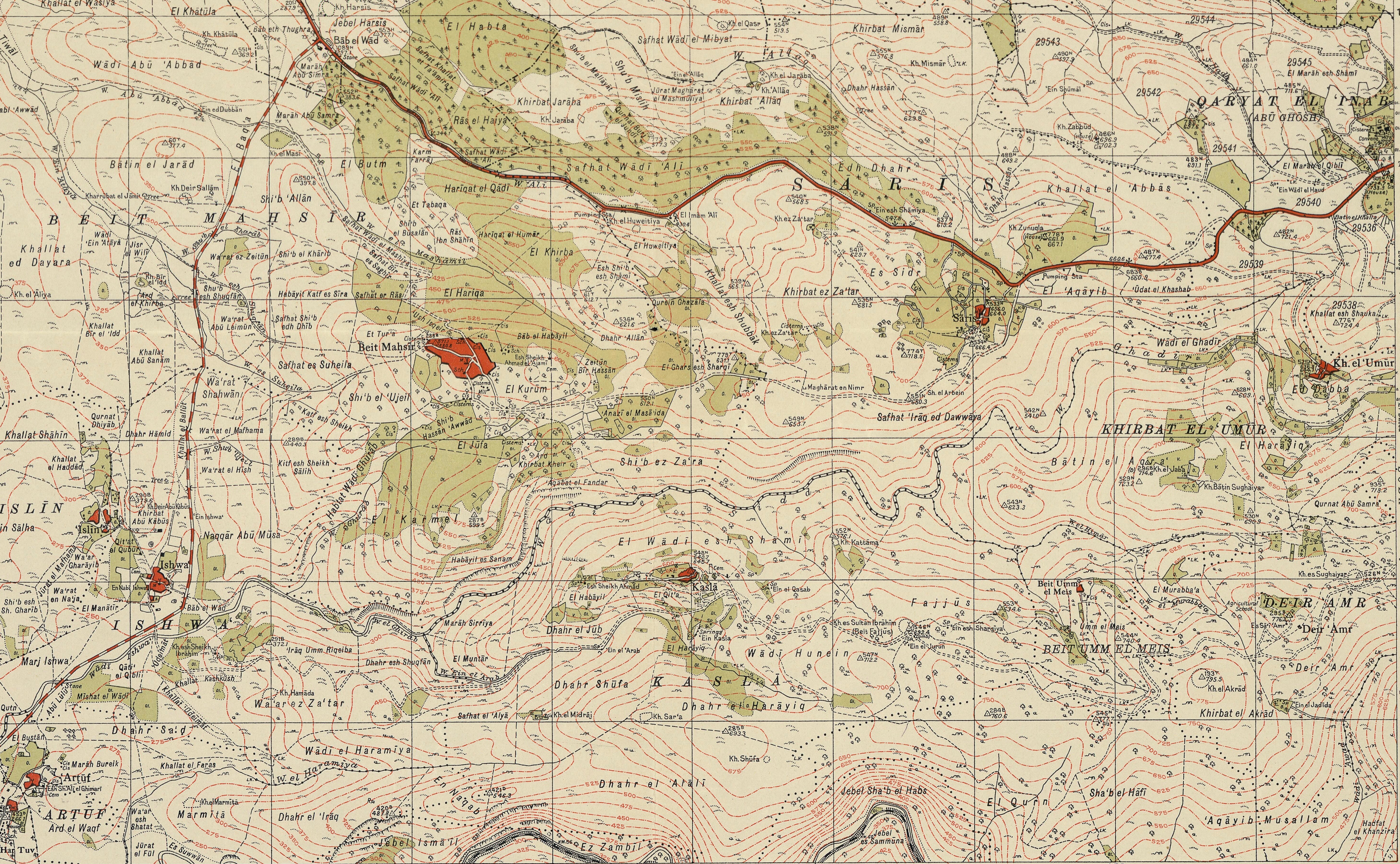
Khirbat al-'Umur 1943 1:20,000 (left)

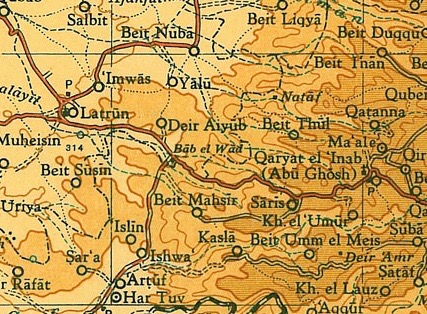
Khirbat al-'Umur 1945 1:250,000

=== 1948, aftermath ===
Khirbat al-'Umur became depopulated on October 21, 1948, after military assault by Yishuv forces.

In 1950, Giv'at Ye'arim was founded on village land.

In 1992, the village site was described: "Stone rubble and window and door frames, partly hidden by wild grass, are scattered across the village site. Many stone terraces are visible. Cactuses grow on the east and north sides of the village site, and almond, olive, fig, and cypress trees grow on the village site itself. The village cemetery, to the south, is covered with dirt and grass but many graves are visible; tombstones stand at the head and foot of each one. The spring of 'Ayn al-'Umur and the stone structure around it can still be seen."

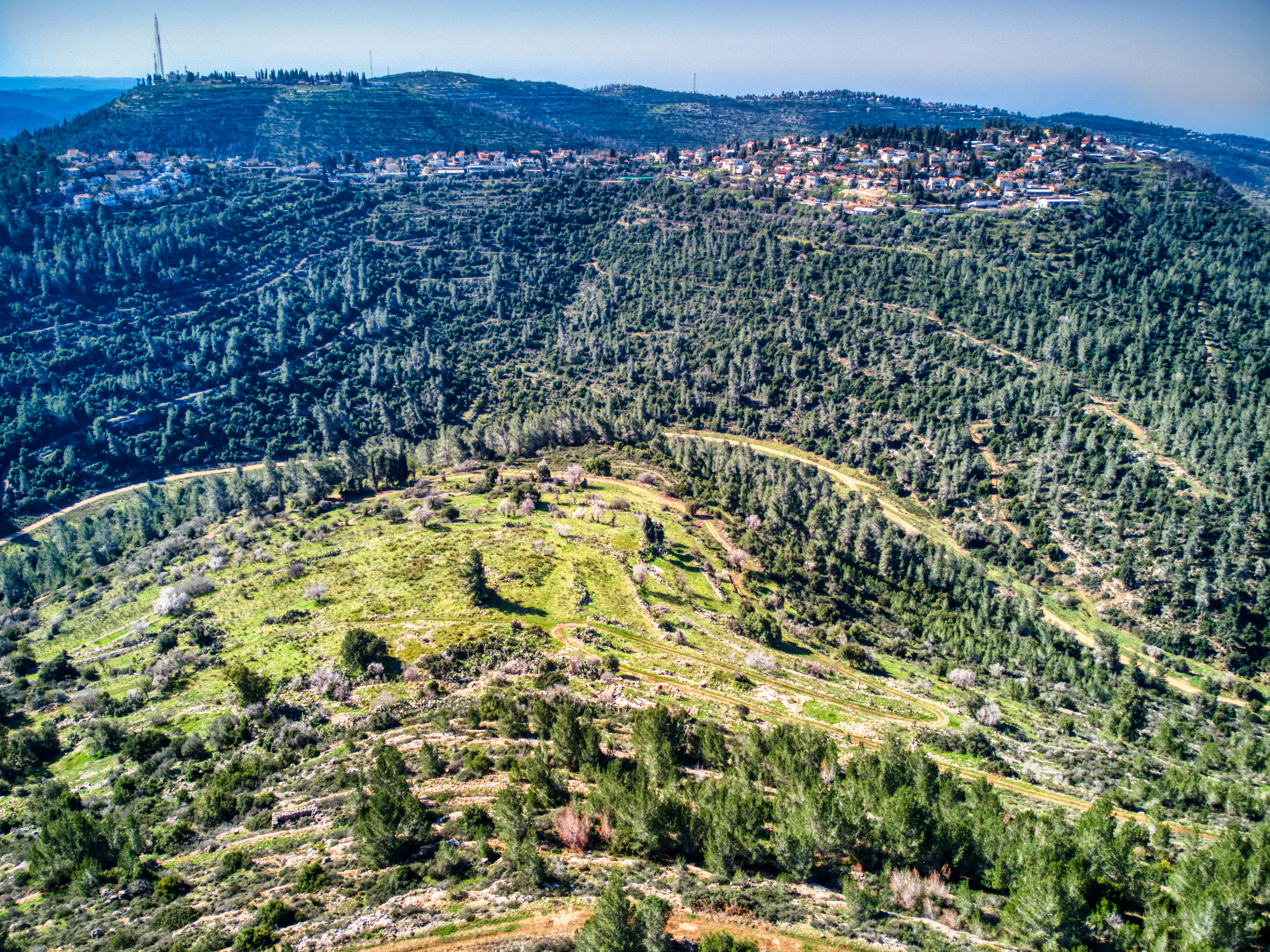
The spur on which the village was located, and on the other side of the riverbed, on the hill, Giv'at Ye'arim that was built on the village land

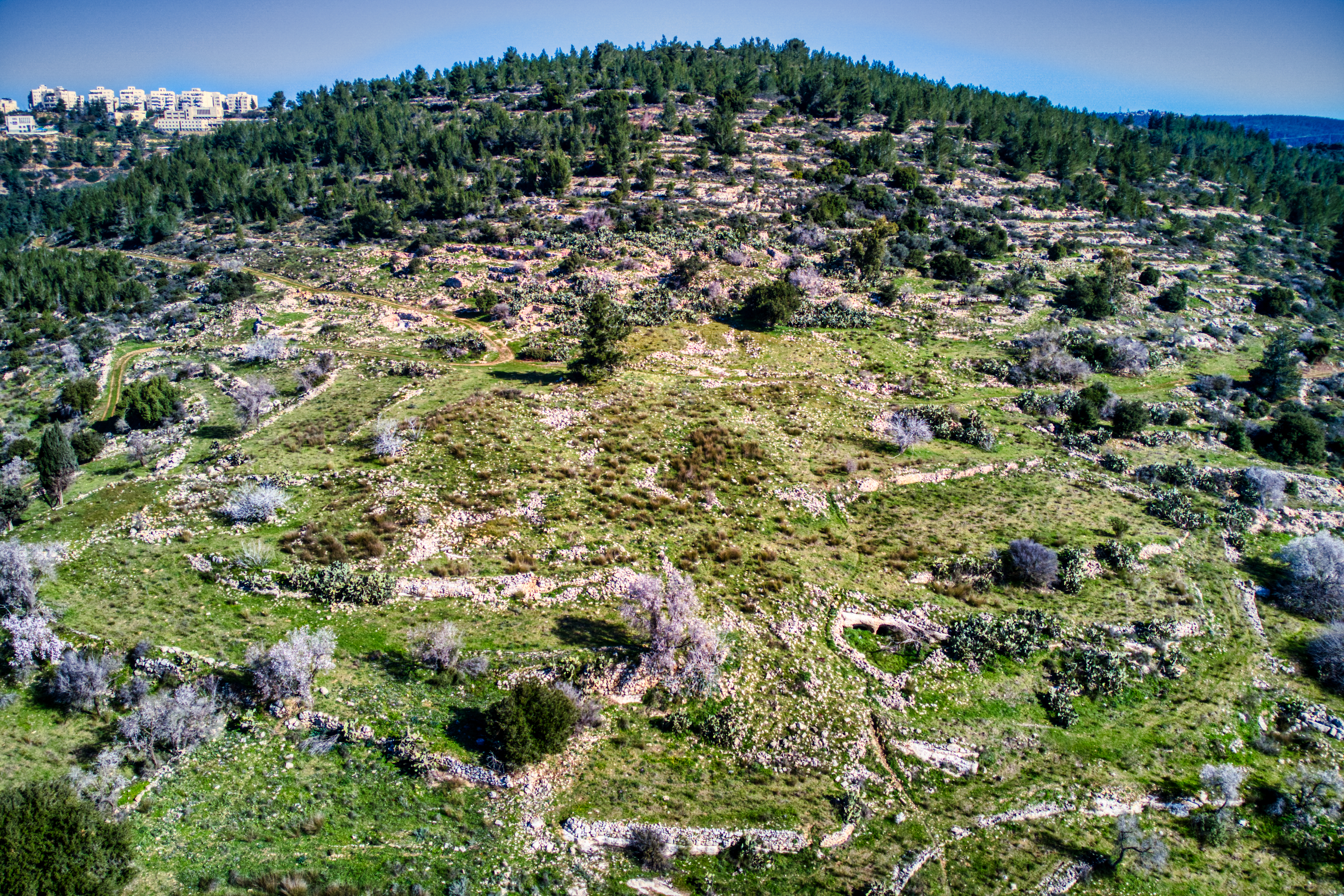
The remains of the village on the spur

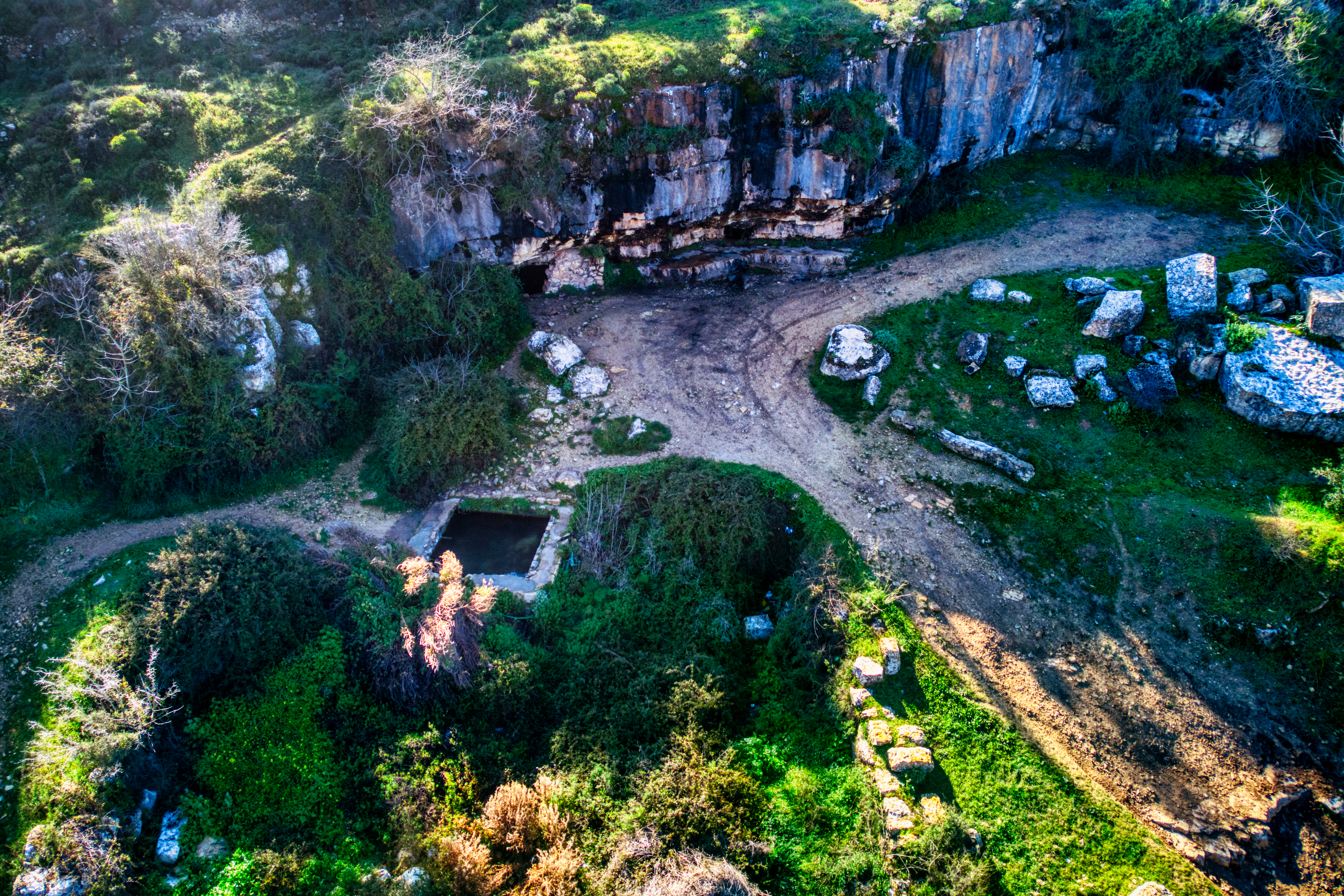
Ein al-'Umur near the village. In the historical maps it is called Ein Mahtush.

== Bibliography ==
- Barron, J. B., ed. (1923). Palestine: Report and General Abstracts of the Census of 1922. Government of Palestine.
- Conder, C.R.; Kitchener, H. H. (1883). The Survey of Western Palestine: Memoirs of the Topography, Orography, Hydrography, and Archaeology. Vol. 3. London: Committee of the Palestine Exploration Fund.
- Department of Statistics (1945). Village Statistics, April, 1945. Government of Palestine.
- Hadawi, S. (1970). Village Statistics of 1945: A Classification of Land and Area ownership in Palestine. Palestine Liberation Organization Research Center. Archived from the original on 2018-12-08.
- Hartmann, M. (1883). "Die Ortschaftenliste des Liwa Jerusalem in dem türkischen Staatskalender für Syrien auf das Jahr 1288 der Flucht (1871)". Zeitschrift des Deutschen Palästina-Vereins. 6: 102–149.
- Khalidi, W. (1992). All That Remains: The Palestinian Villages Occupied and Depopulated by Israel in 1948. Washington D.C.: Institute for Palestine Studies. ISBN 0-88728-224-5.
- Mills, E., ed. (1932). Census of Palestine 1931. Population of Villages, Towns and Administrative Areas. Jerusalem: Government of Palestine.
- Morris, B. (2004). The Birth of the Palestinian Refugee Problem Revisited. Cambridge University Press. ISBN 978-0-521-00967-6.
- Palmer, E. H. (1881). The Survey of Western Palestine: Arabic and English Name Lists Collected During the Survey by Lieutenants Conder and Kitchener, R. E. Transliterated and Explained by E.H. Palmer. Committee of the Palestine Exploration Fund.
- Socin, A. (1879). "Alphabetisches Verzeichniss von Ortschaften des Paschalik Jerusalem". Zeitschrift des Deutschen Palästina-Vereins. 2: 135–163.
