= Leon Suzin =

Polish architect

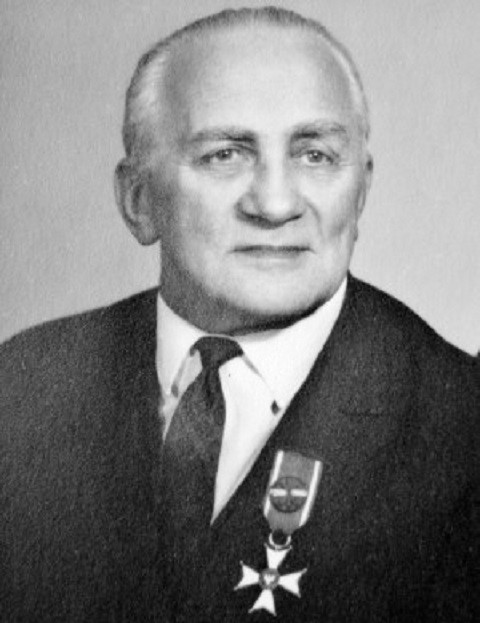
- Born: 18 June 1901; Warsaw, Poland
- Died: 21 December 1976 (aged 75); Warsaw, Poland
- Occupation: Architect

Leon Suzin (18 June 1901 – 21 December 1976) was a Polish architect. His work was part of the architecture event in the art competition at the 1928 Summer Olympics.
