= International Holocaust Remembrance Day =

International memorial day on 27 January for the victims of Nazi genocides

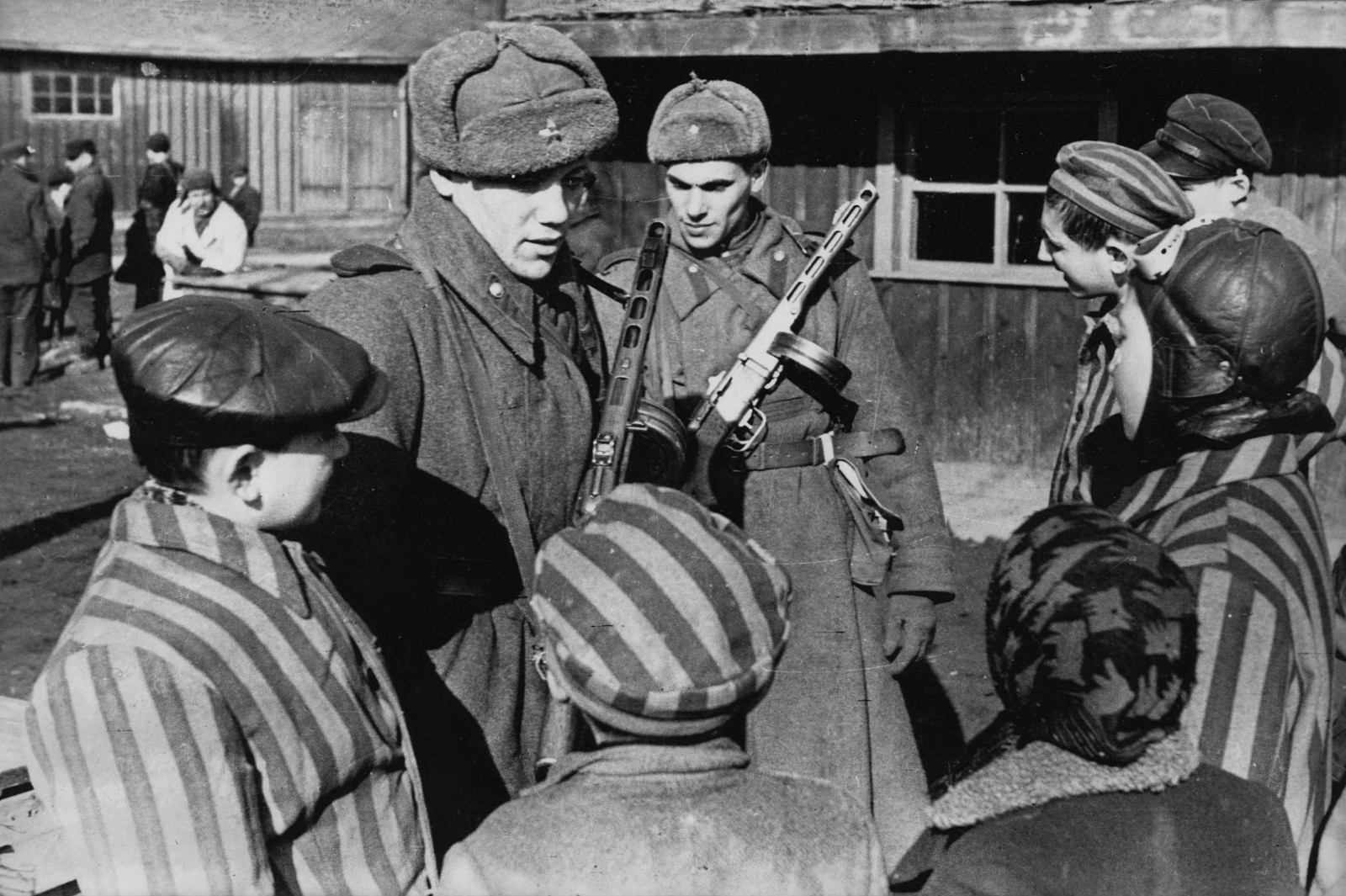
- Liberation of the Auschwitz concentration camp by the Red Army, January 1945.
- Date: 27 January; 22 April (Serbia)
- Frequency: Annual

International Holocaust Remembrance Day, or the International Day in Memory of the Victims of the Holocaust, is an international memorial day on 27 January that commemorates the victims of the Holocaust, which resulted in the genocide of two-thirds of the European Jewish population along with numerous individuals of other minority groups, by Nazi Germany between 1933 and 1945: an attempt to implement its "Final Solution" to the Jewish question. The choice of 27 January for the annual commemoration aligns with the liberation of the Auschwitz concentration camp by the Red Army in 1945.

The day commemorates the systematic extermination of 6 million Jews, representing two-thirds of Europe’s Jewish population, alongside the deaths of millions of others perpetrated by the Nazi regime and its collaborators. It was designated by United Nations General Assembly resolution 60/7 on 1 November 2005. The resolution was developed following a special session convened on 24 January of that year to commemorate the 60th anniversary of the liberation of the Nazi concentration camps and the conclusion of the Holocaust.

Many countries have instituted their own Holocaust memorial days. Many, such as the United Kingdom’s Holocaust Memorial Day, also fall on 27 January; others, such as Yom HaShoah (27 Nisan on the Hebrew calendar), the commemoration day observed by the State of Israel and much of the broader Jewish community, are observed at other times of the year.

== The General Assembly Resolution 60/7 ==
Resolution 60/7, adopted by the General Assembly on 1 November 2005, established 27 January as International Holocaust Remembrance Day. The resolution urges every member nation of the UN to honor the memory of Holocaust victims, six million Jews, "one third of the Jewish people, along with countless members of other minorities," and encourages the development of educational programs about Holocaust history to help prevent future acts of genocide. It rejects any denial of the Holocaust as an event and condemns all manifestations of religious intolerance, incitement, harassment or violence against persons or communities based on ethnic origin or religious belief. It also calls for actively preserving the Holocaust sites that served as Nazi death camps, concentration camps, forced labor camps and prisons, as well as for establishing a UN programme of outreach and mobilization of society for Holocaust remembrance and education.

Resolution 60/7 and International Holocaust Day was an initiative of the State of Israel. Minister of Foreign Affairs of the State of Israel, Silvan Shalom, was the head of the delegation of Israel to the United Nations.

The essence of the text lies in its twofold approach: one that deals with the memory and remembrance of those who were massacred during the Holocaust and the other with educating future generations of its horrors.

The International Day in memory of the victims of the Holocaust is thus a day on which we must reassert our commitment to human rights. [...]

We must also go beyond remembrance, and make sure that new generations know this history. We must apply the lessons of the Holocaust to today's world. And we must do our utmost so that all peoples may enjoy the protection and rights for which the United Nations stands.

— Message by Secretary-General Ban Ki-moon for the second observance of the Holocaust Victims Memorial Day on 19 January 2008

== Commemorations at the United Nations ==
In 2006, 2007, and 2008, Holocaust Remembrance Weeks were organized by The Holocaust and the United Nations Outreach Programme. The programme is part of the Outreach Division of the United Nations Department of Public Information and was established under General Assembly resolution 60/7.

=== In 2006 ===
On 24 January, the United Nations Headquarters launched Holocaust Remembrance Week with the exhibit "No Child's Play – Remembrance and Beyond." Created by Yad Vashem in Jerusalem, the exhibit focused on children during the Holocaust. It showcased toys, games, artwork, diaries, and poems to tell their stories and highlight their struggle for survival amid the horrors of that time. On 25 January, the screening of the movie Fateless by Lajos Koltai took place in the Dag Hammarskjöld Auditorium.

On 27 January, the United Nations Department of Public Information held the first universal observance of International Holocaust Remembrance Day at United Nations Headquarters. In the General Assembly Hall, a memorial ceremony and lecture were held under the theme "Remembrance and Beyond". It featured welcoming remarks by former Under-Secretary General for Communications and Public Information Shashi Tharoor; a videotaped message by former Secretary-General Kofi Annan; statements by the permanent representatives of Israel and Brazil to the UN, Holocaust survivor, historian, and author Gerda Weissmann Klein, and the Gerda and Kurt Klein Foundation; narration of photographs of Holocaust victims memorialized on "Pages of Testimony" in the Hall of Names at Yad Vashem; as well as a performance by the Zamir Chorale of Boston; and a lecture by Yehuda Bauer, an academic advisor to Yad Vashem and the Task Force for International Cooperation on Holocaust Education, Remembrance and Research.

=== In 2007 ===
On 29 January, the second annual observance of the International Day of Commemoration in memory of the victims of the Holocaust was held in the General Assembly Hall at United Nations Headquarters.

Shasta Tharp, former Under-Secretary-General for Communications and Public Information, introduced a programme that began with a video message from Secretary-General Ban Ki-moon. Statements were then made by Sheikha Haya Rashed Al Khalifa, president of the sixty-first session of the General Assembly, and Ambassador Dan Gillerman, Permanent Representative of Israel to the United Nations. The keynote "Remembrance and Beyond" address was given by Madame Simone Veil, a Holocaust survivor, president of the Fondation pour la Mémoire de la Shoah and a member of the Constitutional Council of France.

The observance focused on the importance of infusing today's youth with the lessons of the Holocaust so that future generations may work to prevent hatred, bigotry, racism, and prejudice. Marie Noel, a College of Saint Elizabeth student, shared her experiences visiting former concentration camps in Poland.

The memorial ceremony also focused on the disabled community as one of the many victim groups of the Nazi regime. Thomas Schindlmayr of the United Nations Department of Economic and Social Affairs highlighted the importance of education in promoting tolerance and ending discrimination against all minorities, particularly in light of the adoption by the General Assembly on 13 December 2006 of the landmark Convention on the Rights of Persons with Disabilities.

A musical performance was also given by HaZamir: The International Jewish High School Chamber Choir, a project of the Zamir Choral Foundation founded and directed by Matthew Lazar. Netanel Hershtik, cantor of the Hampton Synagogue, recited the Kaddish.

During the observance the United Nations Department of Public Information also launched a new website and resource for United Nations member states, educators and non-governmental organizations entitled "Electronic Notes for Speakers" developed for the Holocaust and the United Nations Outreach Programme by Yad Vashem – the Holocaust Martyrs' and Heroes Remembrance Authority, Jerusalem, and the USC Shoah Foundation Institute for Visual History and Education and the Mémorial de la Shoah in Paris. The electronic notes provide survivor testimony and information materials that will equip speakers with the tools needed to conduct briefings on the Holocaust and lessons to be learned from it.

The United Nations bookstore made available ten volumes of autobiographical accounts of Holocaust survivors published jointly by The Holocaust Survivors' Memoirs Project and Yad Vashem – the Holocaust Martyrs' and Heroes Remembrance Authority. An initiative of Nobel Peace Prize laureate Elie Wiesel, the Holocaust Survivors' Memoirs Project has collected over 900 manuscripts. Its mission is to provide both the victims and the survivors of the Holocaust with the dignity of a permanent historical presence, not as impersonal statistics but as individuals with names, voices, and emotions. The United Nations bookstore also had a discussion by Daniel Mendelsohn about his book The Lost: A Search for Six of the Six Million.

The Department of Public Information also marked Holocaust Remembrance Week with two exhibits in the United Nations visitors' lobby. The first, entitled "The Holocaust against the Sinti and Roma and Present Day Racism in Europe", focused on the experience of the Roma and Sinti during the Holocaust. The second exhibit featured artwork created by Holocaust survivors, exploring the meaning and understanding of the Holocaust.

On 31 January, a special screening of Volevo solo Vivere (I Only Wanted to Live), directed by Mimmo Calopresti, took place. The film tells the moving story of nine Italian survivors of Auschwitz. The following day, Nazvy svoie im'ia (Spell Your Name), directed by Serhiy Bukovsky, was also screened. The film, about the Holocaust in Ukraine, tells the story of local people who escaped brutal execution and those who rescued friends and neighbours during the Holocaust. Both films, produced by the USC Shoah Foundation Institute for Visual History and Education, were shown in the Dag Hammarskjold Library Auditorium. On 2 February, the third discussion paper in the Holocaust and Genocide series was published about Hitler, Pol Pot and Hutu Power.

=== In 2008 ===
Throughout the week of 28 January 2008, the United Nations Department of Public Information organized a number of events around the world to remember the victims of the Holocaust and underscore the value of human life. The 2008 observance focused on the need to ensure the protection of human rights for all. It coincided with the 60th anniversary of the adoption of the Universal Declaration of Human Rights.

Holocaust Remembrance Day began with the joint launch of a new United Nations Holocaust Remembrance postage stamp issued simultaneously, for the first time, with a national stamp by the Israel Postal Company. The two stamps bear the same design.

On 28 January 2008, at United Nations Headquarters in New York, the daughter of United States Congressman Tom Lantos, himself a Holocaust survivor, delivered a keynote address, "Civic Responsibility and the Preservation of Democratic Values," at the memorial ceremony and concert held in the General Assembly Hall.

Other speakers included Srgjan Kerim (Macedonia), president of the sixty-second session of the General Assembly, Ambassador Dan Gillerman, Permanent Representative of Israel to the United Nations, and Kiyo Akasaka, Under-Secretary-General for Communications and Public Information.

The ceremony also featured a concert with the Tel Aviv University Buchmann-Mehta School of Music symphony orchestra in cooperation with the Israel Philharmonic Orchestra conducted by maestro Zubin Mehta.

On 30 January 2008, the first permanent exhibit on the Holocaust and the United Nations was unveiled. Produced by the Holocaust and United Nations Outreach Programme, it presents an overview of the Holocaust in the context of World War II and the founding of the United Nations. It is seen by the 400,000 visitors who visit the United Nations Headquarters annually. In preparation for the exhibit opening, Elizabeth Edelstein, Director of Education for the Museum of Jewish Heritage, briefed the United Nations tour guides on the history of the Holocaust to further their understanding of this watershed event.

Around the world United Nations offices organized events to mark the Day of Commemoration. In Brazil, an observance was held on 25 January with the president of the country, Jose Inacio Lula da Silva, and the Mayor of Rio de Janeiro, César Maia. In Madagascar, a permanent exhibit on the Holocaust was unveiled at the United Nations Information Centre.

The Holocaust and the United Nations Outreach Programme also coordinated a video conference for students with the United Nations information centres in Antananarivo, Madagascar, Lomé, Togo, and educators at the Mémorial de la Shoah in Paris. At the United Nations office in Ukraine, a round-table discussion was organized in partnership with the Ministry of Education and the Ukrainian Holocaust Study Centre. In Tokyo on 29 January, an educational workshop targeting young students focused on the links between the Holocaust and human rights issues.

Also, the United States Holocaust Memorial Museum provided information material in English and Spanish to a number of United Nations information centers for use in their reference libraries.

To help carry out its educational mission, the Department of Public Information participated in a panel discussion with the United Nations Educational, Scientific and Cultural Organization (UNESCO) in the afternoon of 28 January to highlight the importance of Holocaust education, organized by B'nai B'rith International.

A second exhibit, "Carl Lutz and the Legendary Glass House in Budapest", was co-sponsored by the Carl Lutz Foundation and the Permanent Missions of Switzerland and Hungary. Carl Lutz, the Swiss Vice-Consul in Budapest, had issued certificates of emigration to place tens of thousands of Jews under Swiss protection.

=== In 2019 ===
In January 2019, the Albanian Ambassador to the UN, Besiana Kadare, on behalf of Albania co-hosted together with the World Jewish Congress and the United Nations Department of Global Communications an event on the theme "A story of humanity: the rescue of Jews in Albania". Kadare delivered remarks at the United Nations at a briefing entitled "Holocaust Remembrance: Demand and Defend your Human Rights", marking International Holocaust Remembrance Day and reflecting on the genocide of six million European Jews during World War Two, and the little-known record of Albanians during the Holocaust in Albania, which took in thousands of Jews who would otherwise have ended up in the Nazi death camps.

=== In 2020 ===
In January 2020, Chelsea FC unveiled a mural by Solomon Souza on an outside wall of the West Stand at Stamford Bridge stadium to commemorate Holocaust Remembrance Day. The mural is part of Chelsea's 'Say No to Antisemitism' campaign funded by club owner Roman Abramovich. Included on the mural are depictions of footballers Julius Hirsch and Árpád Weisz, who were killed at Auschwitz concentration camp, and Ron Jones, a British prisoner of war known as the 'Goalkeeper of Auschwitz'.

== Commemorations outside the United Nations ==
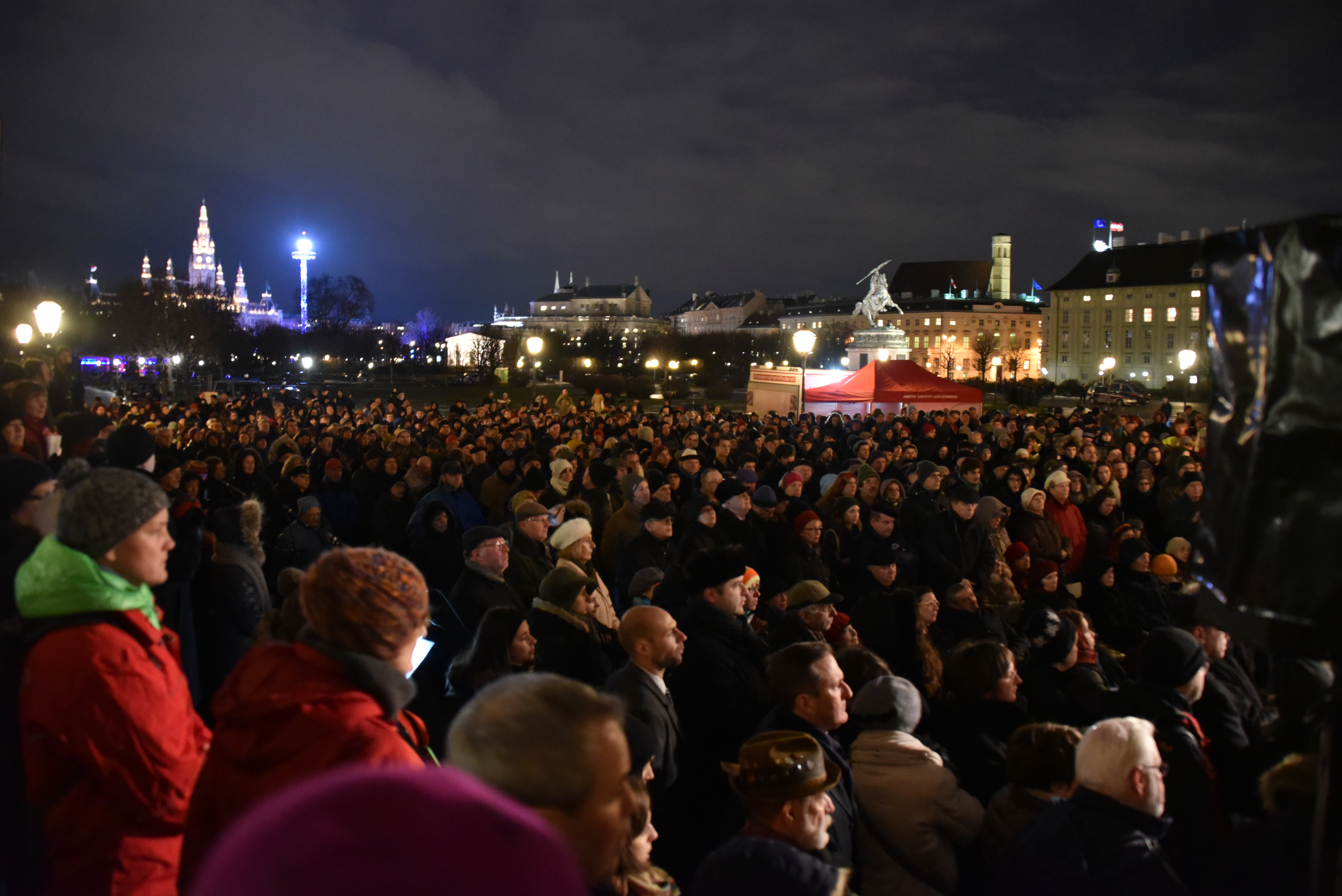
Commemoration at Vienna's Heldenplatz, 2015

Commemorations are held at the United States Holocaust Memorial Museum in Washington, DC, and at Yad Vashem, in Jerusalem.

In Austria, commemorations of the Remembrance Day are held at the Heldenplatz in Vienna since 2012. The broad platform Jetzt Zeichen setzen! calls for participation of the civil society. Speakers include survivors of the Holocaust, antifascist activists and politicians hailing from parties throughout the political spectrum.

In Israel on International Holocaust Remembrance Day government officials, diplomats and ambassadors visit Yad Vashem and there are ceremonies throughout the country. Every year the Ministry of Diaspora Affairs presents an assessment of the state of global antisemitism at a cabinet meeting. The report reviews the main trends and incidents of the last year, in terms of antisemitism and combating antisemitism.

Israel's main national Holocaust memorial day however, known as Yom HaShoah, is on the 27th day of the Hebrew calendar month of Nisan.

== See also ==
- Days of Remembrance of the Victims of the Holocaust (United States)
- European Day of the Righteous
- Holocaust memorial days
- Holocaust Memorial Day (UK)
- International Holocaust Remembrance Alliance
- National Day of Commemorating the Holocaust (Romania)
- United Nations Holocaust Memorial
- Liberation (Holocaust memorial)
- World Holocaust Forum
- Yom HaShoah (April or May)
- Roma Holocaust Memorial Day (2 August)
- Armenian Genocide Remembrance Day (24 April)
- Bengali Genocide Remembrance Day (25 March)
- Holodomor Memorial Day (4th Saturday of November)
- International Day of Reflection on the 1994 Rwanda Genocide and Kwibuka (7 April)
- National Day of Remembrance (Cambodia) (20 May)
- Pontian Greek Genocide Remembrance Day (19 May)
- Nanjing Massacre Memorial Day (13 December)
- United Nations International Day of Commemoration and Dignity of the Victims of the Crime of Genocide and of the Prevention of this Crime (9 December)
- 2023 Neve Yaakov shooting
