= List of Holocaust memorial days =

Annual observance to commemorate victims of the Holocaust

A Holocaust memorial day or Holocaust remembrance day is an annual observance to commemorate the victims of the Holocaust, the genocide of six million Jews and of millions of other Holocaust victims by Nazi Germany and its allies. Many countries, primarily in Europe, have designated national dates of commemoration.

== List ==
=== Worldwide ===
Many observances fall on 27 January, the anniversary of the liberation of Auschwitz concentration camp in 1945. In 2005, the United Nations instituted an international observance, International Holocaust Remembrance Day (International Day of Commemoration in memory of the victims of the Holocaust 27) and established Holocaust and the United Nations Outreach Programme.

| Country | Day | Name | Notes | Ref |
|---|---|---|---|---|
| United Nations | 27 January | International Holocaust Remembrance Day | Designated by United Nations General Assembly Resolution 60/7 on 1 November 2005. | |
| Azerbaijan | 27 January | Day of the Tragedy and Heroism of the Jews | State Committee of the Republic of Azerbaijan for the Work with Religious Organisations participates each 27 January in meetings organised by Jewish communities to commemorate the Holocaust. Holocaust victims are also commemorated during the events held on the anniversary of the victory over fascism, celebrated each year on 9 May. | |
| Australia | 27 January | International Holocaust Remembrance Day | | |
| Austria | 5 May | Memorial Day against Violence and Racism in Memory on the Victims of National Socialism (German: Gedenkveranstaltung gegen Gewalt und Rassismus im Gedenken an die Opfer des Nationalsozialismus) | This day is in purpose of memorial of people who were killed in Gusen concentration camp. In 2022 the Austrian government bought the land where Gusen was and established a memorial museum there. | |
| Belgium | 27 January | International Day of Commemoration in Memory of the Victims of the Holocaust (French: Journée internationale de commémoration de la mémoire des victimes de l’Holocauste; Dutch: Internationale dag voor de herdenking van de slachtoffers van de Holocaust) | | |
| Bulgaria | 10 March | Holocaust Remembrance Day and the "Day of the Salvation of the Bulgarian Jews and of the Victims of the Holocaust and of the Crimes against Humanity" | The day of the revocation of the plan to expel the country's Jewish population, officially designated in 2003. | |
| Canada | 27 Nisan (April/May) | Holocaust Memorial Day - Yom ha-Shoah [Ontario (1998), Prince Edward Island (1999), Alberta (2000)]; Holocaust Memorial Day Yom haShoah [New Brunswick (1999)]; Holocaust Memorial Day - Yom haShoah [Nova Scotia (2000)]; Holocaust-Yom Hashoah Memorial Day / French: Jour commémoratif de l’Holocauste-Yom Hashoah [Quebec (1999)]; Holocaust Memorial Day — Yom Hashoah / French: Jour commémoratif de l'Holocauste — Yom ha-Choah [Manitoba (2000)]; Holocaust Memorial Day [British Columbia (2000), Newfoundland and Labrador (2000), Saskatchewan (2001)] | Matching the Israeli Yom HaShoah date, by acts of the respective provincial legislatures. | —N/a |
| Croatia | 27 January | Day of Remembrance of the Holocaust and for the Prevention of Crimes against Humanity | | |
| Czechia | 27 January | Memorial Day for the Victims of the Holocaust and Prevention of Crimes against Humanity (Czech: Den památky obětí holocaustu a předcházení zločinům proti lidskosti) | | |
| Denmark | 27 January | Auschwitz Day (Danish: Auschwitzdag) | | |
| Estonia | 27 January | Holocaust Remembrance Day (Estonian: Holokausti mälestuspäev) | | |
| Finland | 27 January | Memorial Day for the Victims of the Holocaust (Finnish: Holokaustin uhrien muistopäivä) | It was called Vainon uhrien muistopäivä before 2024. | |
| France | 16-17 July | Anniversary of the Vel' d'Hiv roundup (French: la rafle du Vélodrome d'Hiver) | In 2003 France designated this date as the day of remembrance of genocides and prevention of crimes against humanity. | |
| Germany | 27 January | Memorial Day for the Victims of National Socialism (German: Tag des Gedenkens an die Opfer des Nationalsozialismus) | | |
| Greece | 27 January | National Holocaust Memorial Day (Greek: Εθνική Ημέρα Μνήμης Ολοκαυτώματος) | Since 2004. | |
| Hungary | 16 April | Holocaust Memorial Day (Hungarian: holokauszt magyarországi áldozatainak emléknapja) | Since 2001. | |
| Ireland | 27 January | Holocaust Memorial Day (Irish: Lá Cuimhneacháin an Uileloiscthe) | | |
| Israel (and many Jewish communities in other countries) | 27 Nisan (April/May) | Yom HaShoah (Holocaust Day), or Yom HaZikaron laShoah ve-laGvura (Holocaust and Heroism Remembrance Day) | Both an Israeli day of remembrance and a day of remembrance observed by many Jewish communities in the United States and elsewhere in the world. The date relates both to the Warsaw Ghetto Uprising which began 13 days earlier on the first night of Passover 1943, and to the Israeli Independence Day which is eight days later. | |
| Italy | 27 January | Memorial Day (Italian: Giorno della Memoria) | | |
| Latvia | 4 July | Commemoration Day of the Victims of the Genocide Against the Jewish People Ebreju tautas genocīda upuru piemiņas diena | Burning of the Great Choral Synagogue in Riga in 1941. | |
| Lithuania | 23 September | Day of the Genocide of Lithuania's Jews; Lietuvos žydų genocido diena | Anniversary of the liquidation of the Vilnius ghetto in 1943. | |
| Luxembourg | 27 January | Holocaust Memorial Day (French: journée internationale dédiée à la mémoire des victimes de l’Holocauste; German: internationalen Tag des Gedenkens an die Opfer des Holocausts) | | |
| Netherlands | last Sunday of January | Holocaust Memorial Day (Dutch: Nationale Holocaust Herdenking) | Anniversary of the liberation of Auschwitz on 27 January 1945. | |
| Poland | 27 January | International Day of Commemoration in Memory of the Victims of the Holocaust | Anniversary of the liberation of Auschwitz on 27 January 1945. | |
| Portugal | 27 January | Holocaust Remembrance Day (Portuguese: Dia Internacional da Memória do Holocausto) | There is a Museum of Holocaust in Porto (Museu do Holocausto do Porto). | |
| Romania | 9 October | National Day of Commemorating the Holocaust (Romanian: Ziua Naţională de Comemorare a Holocaustului) | Beginning of deportations of Romanian Jews to Transnistria Governorate in 1941. | |
| Slovakia | 9 September | Holocaust Victims and Racial Hatred Day | On 9 September 1941, Slovakia passed anti-Jewish laws based on the Nuremberg laws. | |
| Spain | 27 January | Day for Holocaust Remembrance and for the Prevention of Crimes against Humanity (Spanish: Día Oficial de la Memoria del Holocausto y la Prevención de los Crímenes contra la Humanidad) | Since 2004. | |
| Sweden | 27 January | Holocaust Remembrance Day (Swedish: Förintelsens minnesdag) | A national remembrance day every year since 1999. | |
| Switzerland | 27 January | International Day of Commemoration in Memory of the Victims of the Holocaust | | |
| Ukraine | 27 January | Holocaust Memorial Day (Ukrainian: Міжнародний день пам’яті жертв Голокосту) | Since 2020. | |
| United Kingdom | 27 January | Holocaust Memorial Day | First held in January 2001 and on the same date every year since. | |
| United States | from 20 April through 27 April 2025 | Days of Remembrance of the Victims of the Holocaust | | |

== Related events ==
- In January 2020, a ceremony was held at Auschwitz to mark the 75th anniversary of its liberation on 27 January 1945. this included speeches by numerous officials and Jewish communal leaders. Large number of Holocaust survivors attended this ceremony. In the UK, government officials, religious leaders and community leaders gathered in London to commemorate this anniversary. On the same date, German police reported they were investigating the sales of a brand of beer with Nazi-style symbols on its label.
- In 2021 a number of Jewish organizations in the United Kingdom incorporated the situation in Xinjiang into their Holocaust Memorial Day remembrances and commemorations.
- In February 2025, Google announced that Holocaust Remembrance Days would no longer be highlighted by default on Google Calendar, arguing that it was no longer "scalable or sustainable" to continue adding the growing number of national and international "cultural moments" manually to its calendars.

== See also ==
- United Nations Holocaust Memorial
- List of Holocaust memorials and museums
- Roma Holocaust Memorial Day
