= International Day of the liberation of Nazi concentration camps =

Annual day of observance on 11 April

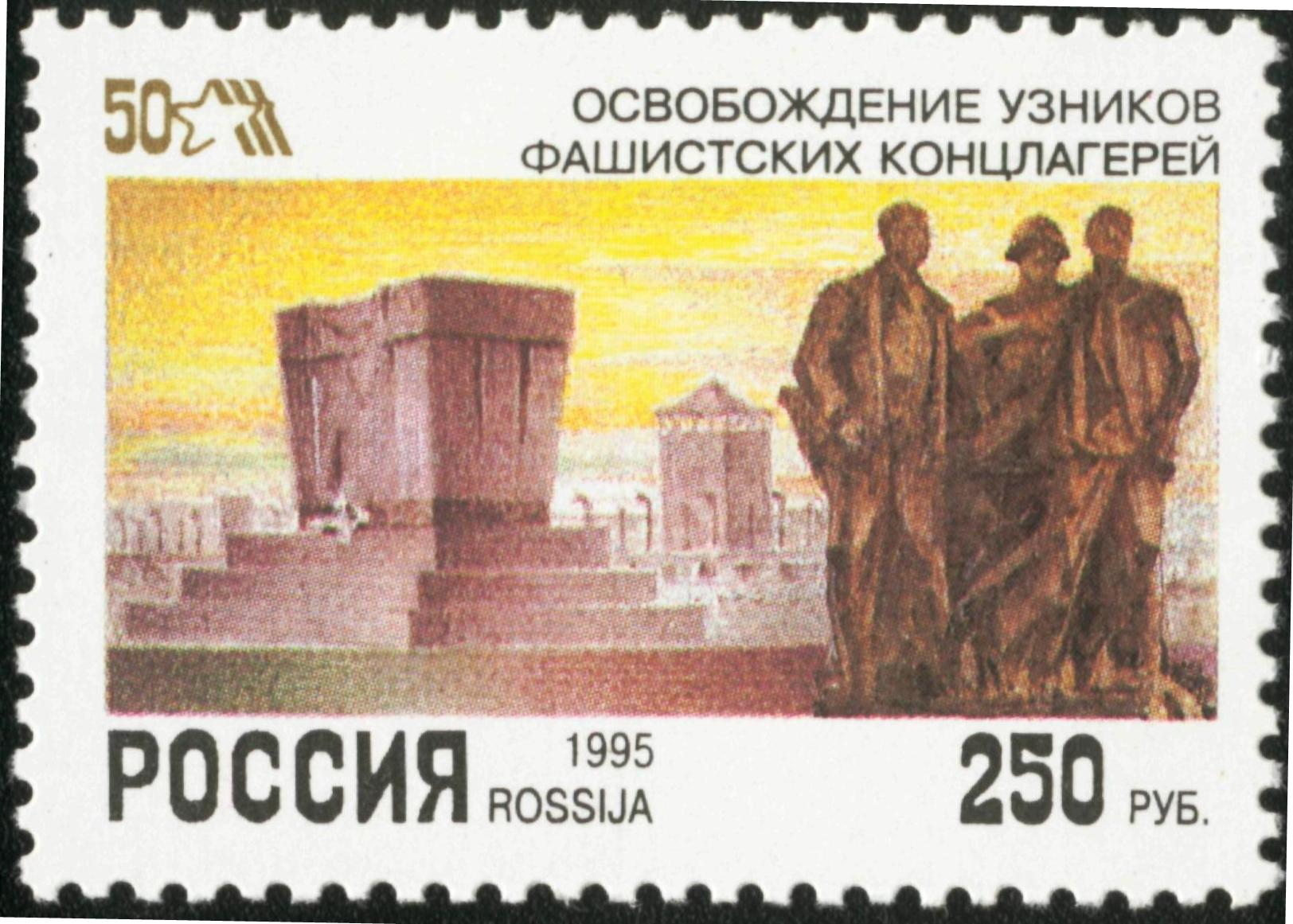
A 1995 Russian postal stamp

The International Day of Liberation of the Nazi concentration camps (Russian: Международный день освобождения узников фашистских концлагерей) is observed annually on 11 April in Russia, Belarus, and Ukraine, in commemoration of the liberation of the Buchenwald concentration camp in 1945.

The Buchenwald camp, located near Weimar, was one of the largest Nazi concentration camps, housing prisoners who were used for forced labour in armament factories. In early April 1945 when the Allied troops approached, the SS had started evacuating the camp, forcing prisoners to leave on death marches or executing them in the forests outside the camp. One prisoner managed to send a short-wave radio message that was picked up by US Army troops, and the camp was subsequently liberated by the a troop of infantry from the Third US Army, on 11 April.

== See also ==
- International Holocaust Remembrance Day
