= Alberta Culture =

Government ministry of Alberta

Agency overview
- Formed: 1992
- Jurisdiction: Government of Alberta
- Minister responsible: Tanya Fir, Minister of Arts, Culture, and Status of Women
- Website: https://www.alberta.ca/culture.aspx

The Alberta Ministry of Arts, Culture and Status of Women, commonly called Alberta Culture, is the Government of Alberta department responsible for the province's cultural industries, arts, and heritage, as well as the promotion of women's rights.

This ministry of the Executive Council of Alberta is the legal continuation of a ministry that has had many names since its creation in 1992, most recently as Alberta Culture, Multiculturalism, and Status of Women. This is the not the first culture ministry; a previous one existed from 1971 to 1992. In 2021, the word "multiculturalism" was dropped from the Ministry's name, but its organization remained unchanged. In 2022, the "Status of Women" was removed from the ministry's name but that portfolio stayed with the ministry with an associate minister specifically responsible, meanwhile multiculturalism was moved into a new ministry with trade and immigration.

The current Minister of Arts, Culture, and Status of Women is Tanya Fir, who was sworn into the role on June 9, 2023, following that year's re-election of the Danielle Smith government. Fir previously held the position of Parliamentary Secretary for Status of Women.

== Intra-ministerial organization ==
The Minister of Culture is appointed by the Lieutenant Governor of Alberta on the advice of the Premier of Alberta and is responsible to the Legislative Assembly of Alberta. The Ministry is then divided into the Department of Culture, the Alberta Foundation for the Arts, and the Alberta Advisory Council on the Francophonie.

== Administrative history ==
The culture and status of women portfolios of the Alberta government have previously been overseen by separate ministers. They have also been sections within the portfolio of the same minister. These portfolios have also each been joined to other government departments at various points.

=== Previous Department of Culture (1971–1992) ===
The first minister of culture was appointed in 1971, but the Cultural Affairs Department within that ministry was founded in 1975 by Order in Council 518/1975, under the authority of the Public Service Administrative Transfers Act. The minister responsible for this was known as the Minister Responsible for Culture (1975–1980), Minister of Culture (1980–1987), and Minister of Culture and Multiculturalism (1987–1992).

Agencies which reported to the minister included the

- Alberta Cultural Heritage Foundation (1978–1987)
- Alberta Multiculturalism Commission (1987–1992)
- Alberta Art Foundation (1972–1991)
- Alberta Foundation for the Performing Arts (1978–1991)
- Alberta Foundation for the Literary Arts (1984–1991)
- Alberta Foundation for the Arts (1991–1992)
- Alberta Library Board (1948–1992), and
- Alberta Advisory Council on the Status of Women (1986–1987).

During this time the minister was responsible for implementing the following legislation: Alberta Academy Act, Alberta Art Foundation Act, Emblems of Alberta Act, Alberta Foundation for the Arts Act, Alberta Heritage Day Act, Alberta Historical Resources Act, Alberta Order of Excellence Act, Alberta Women's Bureau Act, Amusements Act (Part 3), Cultural Development Act, Cultural Foundations Act, Department of Culture Act, Department of Culture and Multiculturalism Act, Foreign Cultural Property Immunity Act, Glenbow-Alberta Institute Act, Government House Act, Libraries Act, and Registered Music Teachers' Association Act.

=== Merged with Tourism, Parks, and Recreation (1992–2015) ===
The Ministry of Community Development, commonly called Alberta Community Development, was a ministry of the Government of Alberta from 1992 to 2019.

It was created in 1992 pursuant to the Public Service Administrative Transfers Act, Order in Council 750/1992. It was created in 1992 from the previous Department of Culture (1915–1992) and the Department of Tourism, Parks, and Recreation (1992).

It subsequently operated as Alberta Community Development (1992–2006), Alberta Tourism, Parks, Recreation and Culture (2006–2008), Alberta Culture and Community Spirit (2008 to 2011), Alberta Culture and Community Services (2011 to 2014).

In 2015, the parks functions were lost to Alberta Environment and ministry was renamed Alberta Culture and Tourism (2015 to 2019).

=== Addition of Status of Women (2019–) ===
The ministry was renamed Alberta Culture, Multiculturalism and Status of Women in 2019. It was renamed Alberta Culture and Status of Women on July 8, 2021 and simply to Alberta Culture on October 24, 2022.

As of 2023, the department is called the Ministry of Arts, Culture and Status of Women.

== Responsibilities ==
As of 2023, Alberta Culture is responsible for two public agencies: Alberta Foundation for the Arts and Conseil consultatif de l'Alberta en matière de francophoni (Alberta Advisory Council on the Francophonie).

As of June 2023, the Ministry is responsible for the following pieces of legislation:

- Alberta Centennial Medal Act
- Alberta Foundation for the Arts Act
- Arts Professions Recognition Act
- Emblems of Alberta Act
- Film and Television Tax Credit Act
- Family Day Act
- Film and Video Classification Act
- First Nations Sacred Ceremonial Objects Repatriation Act
- Foreign Cultural Property Immunity Act
- Freedom to Care Act
- Genocide Remembrance, Condemnation and Prevention Month Act
- Glenbow‑Alberta Institute Act
- Historical Resources Act
- Holocaust Memorial Day and Genocide Remembrance Act
- Libraries Act
- Polish‑Canadian Heritage Day Act
- Queen Elizabeth II Platinum Jubilee Recognition Act
- Reservists’ Recognition Act
- Special Days Act
- Ukrainian‑Canadian Heritage Day Act
- Ukrainian Famine and Genocide (Holodomor) Memorial Day Act
- Women’s Institute Act
