= Days of Remembrance of the Victims of the Holocaust =

Period of commemoration in the United States

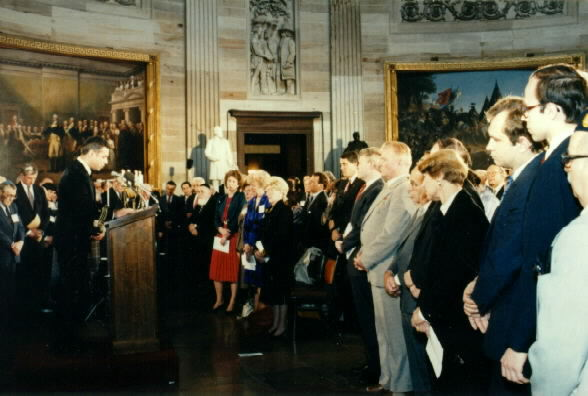
Rabbi Arnold Resnicoff delivers invocation at national DRVH ceremony, Capitol Rotunda, April 27, 1987

The Days of Remembrance of the Victims of the Holocaust (DRVH) is an annual eight-day period designated by the United States Congress for civic commemorations and special educational programs that help citizens remember and draw lessons from the Holocaust. The annual DRVH period normally begins on the Sunday before the Israeli observance of Yom HaShoah, Holocaust Memorial Day, and continues through the following Sunday, usually in April or May. A National Civic Commemoration is held in Washington, D.C., with state, city, and local ceremonies and programs held in most of the fifty states, and on U.S. military ships and stations around the world. The United States Holocaust Memorial Museum designates a theme for each year's programs, and provides materials to help support remembrance efforts.

A House Joint resolution 1014 designated April 28 and 29 of 1979 as "Days of Remembrance of Victims of the Holocaust". Senator John Danforth of Missouri, who originated the resolution, chose April 28 and 29 because it was on these dates that American troops liberated the Dachau concentration camp and a number of its satellite camps in 1945, as well as rescuing hundreds of Jewish-ethnicity camp inmates driven southwards from Dachau by the Nazis on a death march only days later.

In 2005, the United Nations established a different date for International Holocaust Remembrance Day, January 27—the day in 1945 when the Soviet Red Army liberated the Auschwitz–Birkenau concentration camp—but the Yom HaShoah date of Nisan 27 on the Hebrew calendar continues as the date for the determination of the 8-day DRVH commemoration. This date also links the DRVH to the anniversary of the Warsaw Ghetto Uprising in 1943.

== Background ==
6/22/1978 – OFFICIAL TITLE AS INTRODUCED: A resolution designating April 28 and 29 of 1979 as "Days of Remembrance of Victims of the Holocaust". Senator John Danforth of Missouri, whom I commend for having originated the resolution, chose April 28 and 29, because it was on these dates, in 1945, that American troops liberated the Dachau concentration camp

A resolution designating April 28 and 29 of 1979 as "Days of Remembrance of Victims of the Holocaust". Senator John Danforth of Missouri chose April 28 and 29, because it was on these dates, in 1945, that American troops liberated the Dachau concentration camp.

On 1 November 1978, President Jimmy Carter signed an Executive Order establishing the President's Commission on the Holocaust, to be chaired by Holocaust survivor Elie Wiesel. Its mandate was to investigate the creation and maintenance of a memorial to victims of the Holocaust and an appropriate annual commemoration in their memory.

Executive Order 12093, November 1, 1978:

- 1-201. The Commission shall submit a report to the President and the Secretary of the Interior containing its recommendation with respect to the establishment and maintenance of an appropriate memorial to those who perished in the Holocaust.
- 1-202. The Commission's report shall examine the feasibility of obtaining funds for creation and maintenance of the Memorial through contributions of the American people.
- 1-203. The Commission shall recommend appropriate ways for the nation to commemorate April 28 and 29, 1979, which the Congress has resolved shall be called "Days of Remembrance of Victims of the Holocaust".

On April 24, 1979, in anticipation of the Commission's report, the first National Civic Commemoration was held in the Capitol Rotunda, with the address delivered by President Carter:

"Although words do pale, yet we must speak. We must strive to understand. We must teach the lessons of the Holocaust. And most of all, we ourselves must remember.

We must learn not only about the vulnerability of life, but of the value of human life. We must remember the terrible price paid for bigotry and hatred and also the terrible price paid for indifference and for silence....

To truly commemorate the victims of the Holocaust, we must harness the outrage of our memories to banish all human oppression from the world. We must recognize that when any fellow human being is stripped of humanity; when any person is turned into an object of repression; tortured or defiled or victimized by terrorism or prejudice or racism, then all human beings are victims, too.

The world's failure to recognize the moral truth forty years ago permitted the Holocaust to proceed. Our generation—the generation of survivors—will never permit the lesson to be forgotten."

On September 27, 1979, the Commission presented its report to the President, recommending the establishment of a national Holocaust memorial museum in Washington, D.C. with three main components: a national museum/memorial, an educational foundation, and a Committee on Conscience.

The United States Holocaust Memorial Council (USHMC) was established in 1980 by Public Law 96-388 to coordinate an annual, national civic commemoration of the DRVH in Washington, D.C.; to oversee the creation of the United States Holocaust Memorial Museum and to provide support for State and local civic ceremonies in each of the fifty states. Since 1984, the United States military has also taken part in DRVH ceremonies.

The first Council-sponsored DRVH national civic commemoration was held on April 30, 1981, in the White House. President Ronald Reagan, making his first public appearance after recovering from an attempted assassination, said:

"We remember the suffering and the death of Jews and all those others who were persecuted in World War II. ... We commemorate the days of April in 1945 when American and Allied Troops liberated Nazi death camps. ... The tragedy ... took place ... in our life time. We share the wounds of the survivors. We recall the pain only because we must never permit it to come again. ... Our spirit is strengthened by remembering and our hope is in our strength".

With some few exceptions, the annual National Civic Commemoration has taken place in the Capitol Rotunda, chosen as the appropriate venue, as described in these words by Senator Robert Byrd, the U.S. Senate Minority Leader, delivered during the 1986 ceremony:

"Today the Congress of the United States pauses in its deliberations to take part in the Days of Remembrance of victims of the Holocaust.

As we briefly lay aside the problems and the promises confronting our nation today to memorialize the supreme tragedy of more than forty years ago, there is no more appropriate location in which to do this than here in the Capitol Rotunda. This Rotunda is the symbol of all that the unspeakable crimes of the Holocaust tried to eliminate: human rights, individual liberties, the independence of nations living in freedom.

Our holding this ceremony here symbolizes the ultimate triumph of these values, which other democratic nations also cherish, over the unspeakable negation of those principles embodied by the Holocaust."

At the close of the 1987 commemoration, the words of Rabbi Arnold Resnicoff's prayer expressed the goals of the DRVH in spiritual terms:

So, from the Holocaust, we learn:

when we deny humanity in others, we destroy humanity within ourselves. When we reject the human, and the holy, in any neighbor's soul, then we unleash the beast, and the barbaric, in our own heart.

And, since the Holocaust, we pray: if the time has not yet dawned when we can all proclaim our faith in God, then let us say, at least, that we admit we are not gods ourselves. If we cannot yet see the face of God in others, then let us see, at least,

a face as human as our own.

== Defining the Holocaust ==
President Biden delivers remarks at the U.S. Holocaust Memorial Days of Remembrance Ceremony.

In 1979, the President's Commission on the Holocaust provided the following definition to help guide the Council and its observances:

The Holocaust was the systematic, bureaucratic annihilation of six million Jews by the Nazis and their collaborators as a central act of state during the Second World War; as night descended, millions of other peoples were swept into this net of death. It was a crime unique in the annals of human history, different not only in the quantity of violence—the sheer numbers killed—but in its manner and purpose as a mass criminal enterprise organized by the state against defenseless civilian populations. The decision to kill every Jew everywhere in Europe: the definition of Jew as target for death transcended all boundaries....

The concept of the annihilation of an entire people, as distinguished from their subjugation, was unprecedented; never before in human history had genocide been an all-pervasive government policy unaffected by territorial or economic advantage and unchecked by moral or religious constraints....

The Holocaust was not simply a throwback to medieval torture or archaic barbarism, but a thoroughly modern expression of bureaucratic organization, industrial management, scientific achievement, and technological sophistication. The entire apparatus of the German bureaucracy was marshaled in the service of the extermination process.

The Department of Defense (DOD) used this definition as the foundation of goals for DRVH programs. In its Guide for Annual Commemorative Observances, stressing that remembrance programs must remember the horror of the Holocaust in specific anti-Jewish terms, but not only in those terms: remembrance programs must understand that the lessons of the Holocaust include a rejection of all forms of discrimination, prejudice, bigotry, and hatred:

The Holocaust and Anti-Semitism

The Holocaust was an event contemporaneous in large part with World War II—but separate from it. In fact, the Final Solution often took precedence over the war effort—as trains, personnel, and material needed at the front were not allowed to be diverted from death camp assignments.

On a very basic level, therefore, the Holocaust must be confronted in terms of the specific evil of anti-Semitism—virulent hatred of the Jewish people and the Jewish faith. An immediate response to the Holocaust must be a commitment to combat prejudice wherever it might exist.

The Holocaust and Humanity

From the Holocaust, we begin to understand the dangers of all forms of discrimination, prejudice, and bigotry; hatreds which, in their extreme forms, can lead to mass slaughter and genocide—and, on the personal level, can endanger our ethical being.

From the Holocaust, we can learn the way evil can be commonplace and acceptable—so that no one takes a stand until it is too late.

From the Holocaust we can examine humans as victims and executioners, oppressors and liberators, collaborators and bystanders, rescuers, and witnesses.

From the Holocaust, we are reminded that humans can exhibit both depravity and heroism. The victims of Nazi persecution demonstrated tremendous spiritual fortitude and resistance. There was also the physical and spiritual heroism of those who risked their lives to save others.

From the Holocaust, we must remember the depths to which humanity might sink; but then we must remember, as well, the heights to which we might aspire.

On April 18, 2007, in a DRVH ceremony held in the U.S. Holocaust Memorial Museum, President George W. Bush delivered an address that linked definitions and words—including the "new word", genocide, that had come out of the Holocaust experience—to the challenge to remember:

This is a place devoted to memory. Inside this building are etched the words of the Prophet Isaiah: "You are my witness." As part of this witness, these walls show how one of the world's most advanced nations embraced a policy aimed at the annihilation of the Jewish people. These walls help restore the humanity of the millions who were loaded into trains and murdered by men who considered themselves cultured. And these walls remind us that the Holocaust was not inevitable; it was allowed to gather strength and force only because of the world's weakness and appeasement in the face of evil.

Today, we call what happened "genocide", but when the Holocaust started, this word did not yet exist. In a 1941 radio address, Churchill spoke of the horrors the Nazis were visiting on innocent civilians in Russia. He said, "We are in the presence of a crime without a name." It is an apt description of the evil that followed the swastika. Mankind had long experience with savagery and slaughter before. Yet in places such as Auschwitz and Dachau and Buchenwald, the world saw something new and terrible: the state-sanctioned extermination of a people, carried out with the chilling industrial efficiency of a so-called modern nation.

Some may be tempted to ask: Why have a museum dedicated to such a dark subject? The men and women who built this museum will tell you: Because evil is not just a chapter in history; it is a reality in the human heart. So this museum serves as a living reminder of what happens when good and decent people avert their eyes from hatred and murder. It honors those who died by serving as the conscience for those who live. And it reminds us that the words "never again" do not refer to the past; they refer to the future.

You who are survivors know why the Holocaust must be taught to every generation. You who lost your families to the gas chambers of Europe watch as Jewish cemeteries and synagogues across that continent are defaced and defiled. You who bear the tattoos of death camps hear the leader of Iran declare that the Holocaust is a myth. You who have found refuge in a Jewish homeland know that tyrants and terrorists have vowed to wipe it from the map. And you who have survived evil know that the only way to defeat it is to look it in the face and not back down.

== Commemorations ==
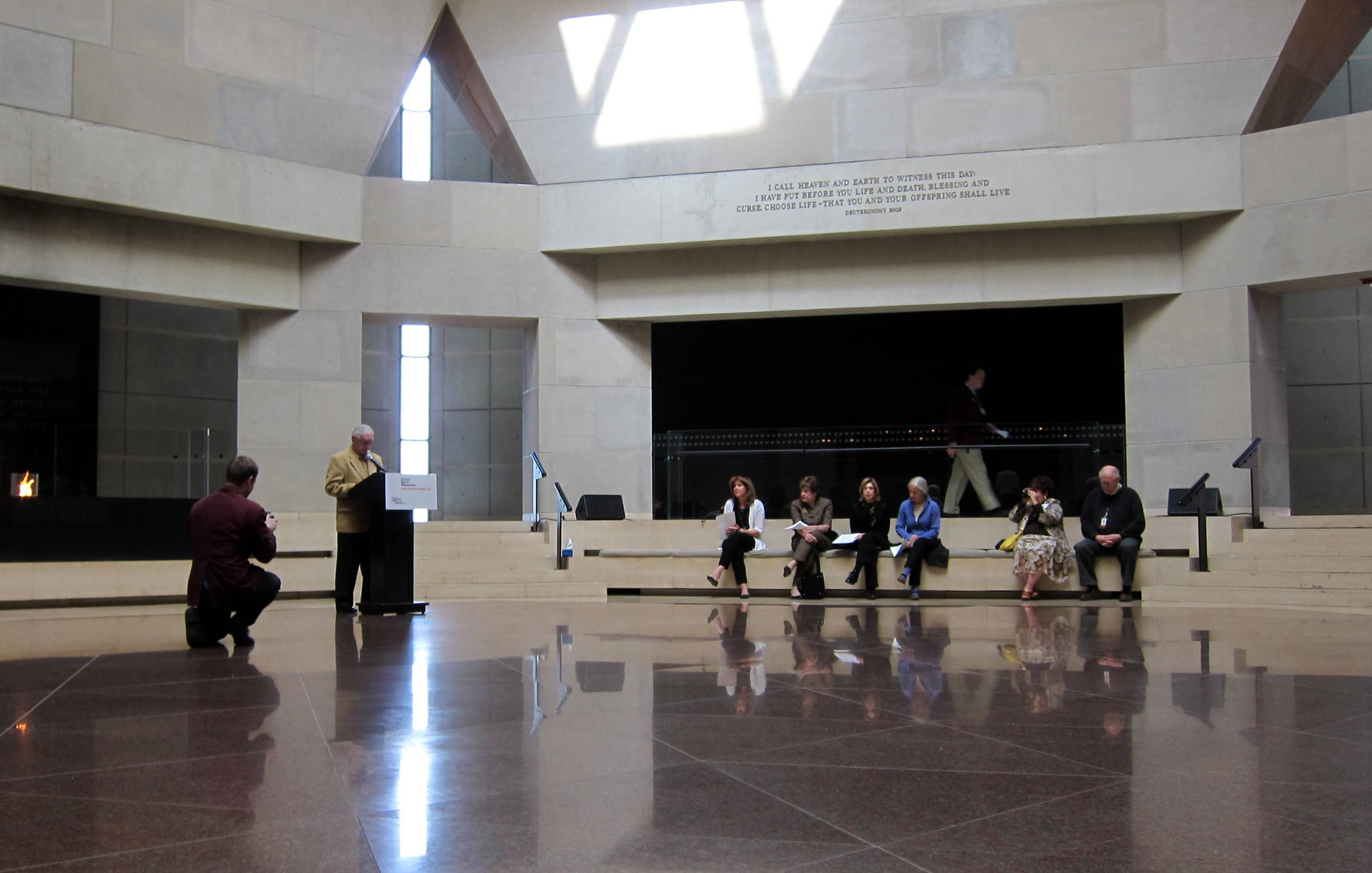
While standing inside The Hall of Remembrance, located within the United States Holocaust Memorial Museum in Washington, D.C., a volunteer reads the names of Holocaust victims during the Days of Remembrance of the Victims of the Holocaust.

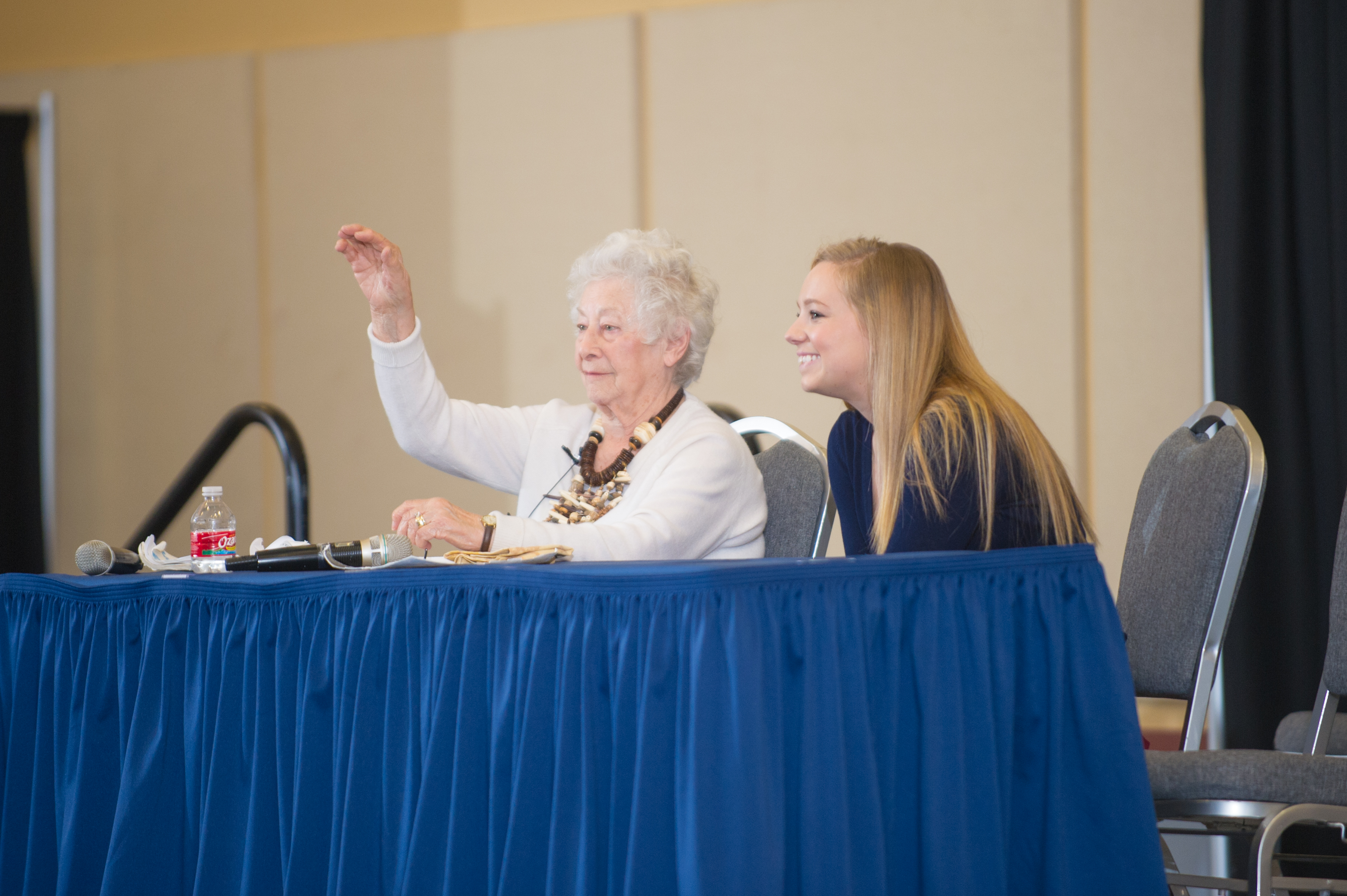
Margaret Furst speaking at Texas A&M University–Commerce's Holocaust Remembrance Day on April 13, 2015

In addition to coordinating the National Civic Commemoration, ceremonies and educational programs during the week of the DRVH are regularly held throughout the country, sponsored by Governors, Mayors, veterans groups, religious groups, schools, and military ships and stations throughout the world. In addition, government organizations often sponsor programs of their own, including an annual Federal Interagency Holocaust Remembrance Program, in Washington, D.C.

Each year, the USHMM designates a special theme for DRVH observances, and prepares DRVH materials to support observances and programs throughout the nation. Themes have included:

- 2014 – Confronting the Holocaust: American Responses
- 2013 – Never Again: Heeding the Warning Signs
- 2012 – Choosing to Act: Stories of Rescue
- 2011 – Justice and Accountability in the Face of Genocide: What Have We Learned?
- 2010 – Stories of Freedom: What You Do Matters
- 2009 – Never Again: What You Do Matters
- 2008 – Do Not Stand Silent: Remembering Kristallnacht 1938
- 2007 – Children in Crisis: Voices From the Holocaust
- 2006 – Legacies of Justice
- 2005 – From Liberation to the Pursuit of Justice
- 2004 – For Justice and Humanity
- 2003 – For Your Freedom and Ours
- 2002 – Memories of Courage
- 2001 – Remembering the Past for the Sake of the Future

As an integral part of the commitment to remember, the U.S. Holocaust Memorial Council and the U.S. Holocaust Memorial Museum have undertaken a number of additional activities over the years to broaden public understanding of the Holocaust, to encourage preservation of artifacts and documents, and to expand scholarship and teaching about the Holocaust.

One of the earliest events was the 1981 International Liberators Conference of the Department of State, held in Washington, D.C. Official delegations came from the Jewish Brigade and the countries of Belgium, Canada, Czechoslovakia, Denmark, France, The Netherlands, New Zealand, Norway, Polish People's Republic, Socialist Federal Republic of Yugoslavia, the USSR, and the United Kingdom. Also participating were World War II veterans from every state in the Union, who had served in divisions that helped liberate Nazi concentration camps. A book based on this conference, The Liberators of the Nazi Concentration Camps, 1945, was published by the Council in 1987.

== Military participation ==
In 1984, the long-term efforts of a Navy Jewish chaplain, Rabbi Arnold Resnicoff, to convince the Department of Defense to participate in the national DRVH were successful. For a number of years he had been making the case at many levels of military leadership that General Eisenhower had already initiated a remembrance program when, after U.S. forces liberated Ohrdruf (a sub-camp of Buchenwald), Eisenhower called for reporters from the U.S. and U.K. to document evidence of the Holocaust, so that, Eisenhower said, the time would never come when such atrocities could be denied, and reports about them could be regarded as mere propaganda. Additionally, Eisenhower's words—"that the American GI did not always understand what he was fighting for, so he should see this evidence, to understand, at least, what he was fighting against" —became, Resnicoff successfully argued, the foundation of an historic military effort to remember and learn from the Holocaust that today's military had the duty to honor and carry on.

Efforts to drive military involvement took a significant step forward when Colonel Harvey T. Kaplan, U.S. Army, the Executive Director of the Defense Equal Opportunity Council, lent his strong support to the effort, and on April 1, 1984, Secretary of Defense Caspar Weinberger signed a memorandum to the military services, urging the Chairman of the Joint Chiefs of Staff and other military commanders to participate in the annual program for the first time. To support military programs, the United States Navy Chaplain Corps created the first military resource materials for programs and observances (Horror and Hope: Americans Remember the Holocaust).

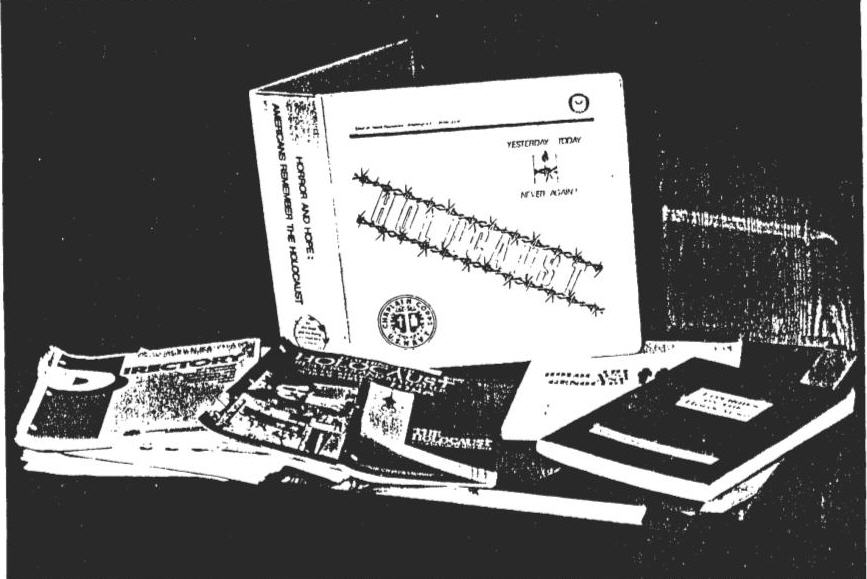
1987 Chaplain Resource Board materials for Days of Remembrance ceremonies

Later, the Department of Defense, in cooperation with the United Holocaust Memorial Council, and the Anti-Defamation League of B'nai B'rith, created the official Department of Defense Guide for remembrance ceremonies on all U.S. military ships and stations.

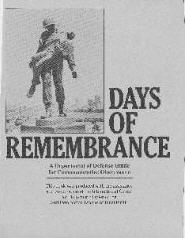
US Department of Defense Guide to official Holocaust Days of Remembrance ceremonies

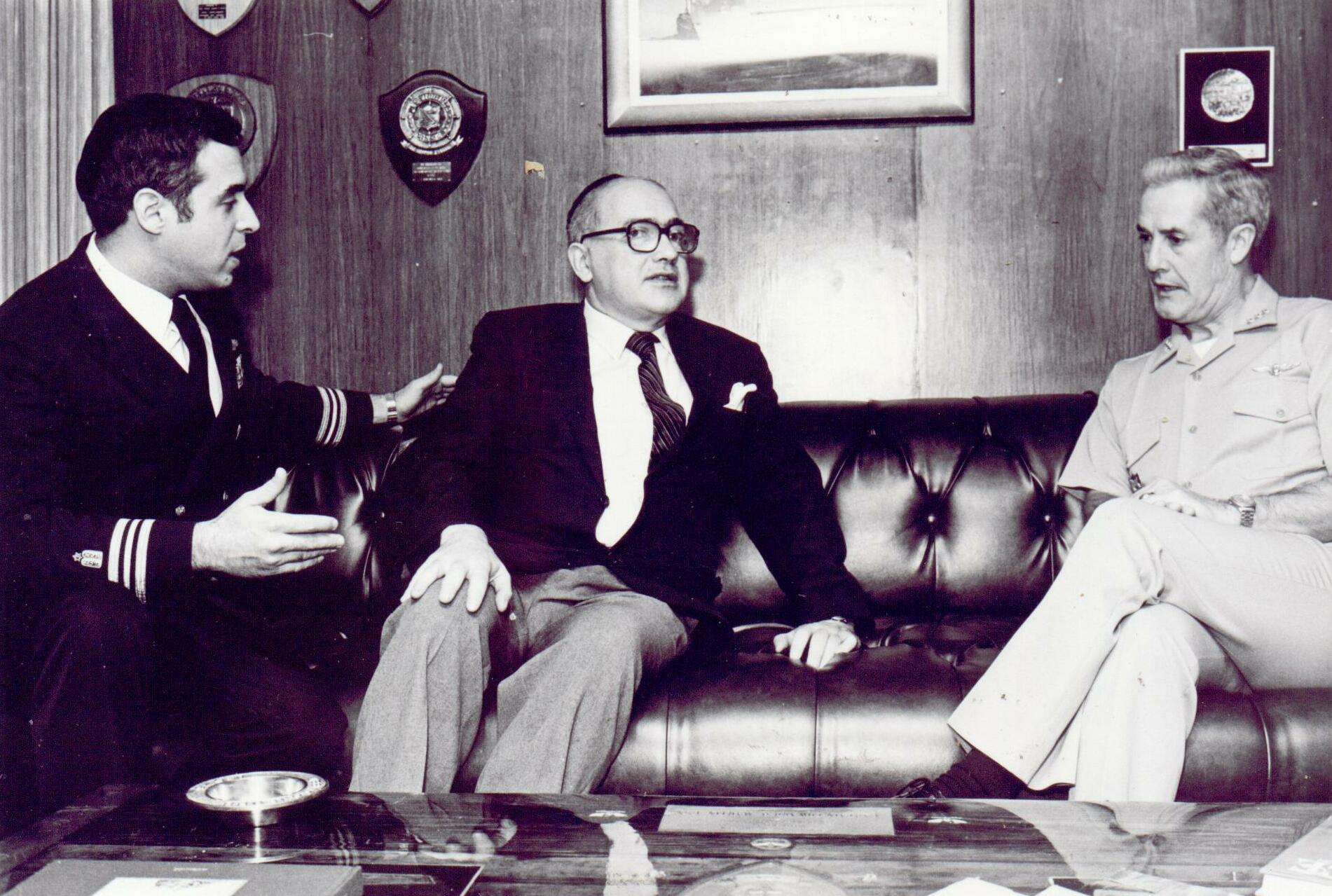
Rabbi Seymour Siegel (center), then Executive Director of the U.S. Holocaust Memorial Council, meets the Sixth Fleet Commander, Vice Admiral Edward Martin (right), and Assistant Sixth Fleet Chaplain Arnold Resnicoff (left), to discuss the participation of U.S. Navy Sixth Fleet ships in the U.S. annual Days of Remembrance of the Victims of the Holocaust. USS Puget Sound, Gaeta, Italy, 1984.

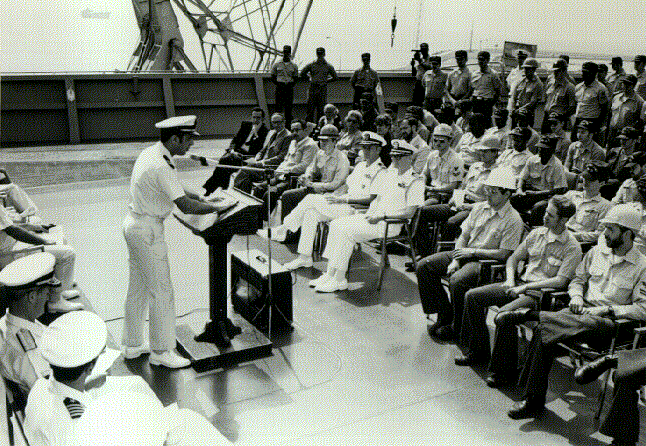
U.S. Navy Chaplain Arnold Resnicoff leads the first official Navy shipboard DRVH Service onboard SixthFleet Flagship, USS Puget Sound, Malaga, Spain.

Support for continued military involvement in this effort included the President in his role as Commander-in-Chief, and both the first and second editions of the Department of Defense Guide included signed Presidential letters endorsing the effort. In 1984, the first official year of military involvement, Rabbi Seymour Siegel, Executive Director of the United States Holocaust Memorial Council, met Vice Admiral Edward Martin, Commander, United States Sixth Fleet. As a result of that meeting, the first shipboard Holocaust Days of Remembrance Ceremony was conducted on board USS Puget Sound (AD-38), the Sixth Fleet Flagship, during a port visit to Málaga, Spain.

The DOD Guide included background information on the history of the DRVH and a sample ceremony for military installations. It also included materials that could be used in remembrance and educational programs and ceremonies, divided into eight sections: (1) The Liberators; (2) The Horror; (3) The Process of Annihilation; (4) Bystanders and Collaborators; (5) The Response; (6) Resistance and Rescue; (7) The Shadow; (8) America Remembers.

The cover of the DOD Guide featured a photograph of the sculpture, Liberation, depicting an American soldier carrying a Holocaust victim. The Guide includes this description of the "cover illustration:

Dedicated on May 30, 1985, the fifteen foot, two-ton bronze sculpture, Liberation, is the creation of the late Nathan Rapoport, the Polish-born artist who died on June 4, 1987. His artistic goal was to embody in bronze a daring vision: in the face of sorrow and tragedies, he asserted that hope can triumph despite atrocity. The sculpture is located in Liberty State Park, New Jersey, which forms a triangle with the Statue of Liberty and Ellis Island.

Liberation depicts an American soldier carrying a survivor out of a concentration camp. The chests of the rescuer and rescued are joined, as if sharing one heart. The way that the survivor's body is cradled in the arms of his liberator reflects comfort and trust.

Liberation is a testament to the Americans who liberated the camps, and it is a memorial to those who perished. But it is also a symbol of the strong helping the weak, not persecuting them. It is a vision of one human being supporting another. It is a tribute to the best of America's dreams: freedom, compassion, bravery, and—above all—hope.

== Remembering ==
In 1989, the year the revised Department of Defense Guide for DRVH observances, was issued, President George H. W. Bush summed up the goal not only for military participation, but for the annual National Days of Remembrance of the Victims of the Holocaust, as a whole:

Our challenge today is to insist that time will not become the Nazis' friend, that time will not fade our sense of specificity, the uniqueness of the Holocaust, that time will not lead us to make the Holocaust into an abstraction. Our challenge today is to remember the Holocaust, for if we remember we will, as our soldiers did, look its evil in the face. ... For memory is our duty to the past, and memory is our duty to the future.

On April 24, 2017, President Donald Trump issued Proclamation 9594: Days of Remembrance of Victims of the Holocaust, 2017.

== See also ==
- Liberation (Holocaust memorial)
- United States Holocaust Memorial Museum
- Yom HaShoah
- Holocaust Memorial Day
- Holocaust Studies and Materials
- Responsibility for the Holocaust
- International Holocaust Remembrance Day
- Holocaust Memorial Day (UK)
- Yad VaShem
- Holocaust Resources
- Shoah Foundation
- Information on the documentary film, Shoah
- Day of Remembrance (Japanese Americans)
