= Liberation (Holocaust memorial) =

- Official U.S. Dept. of Defense DRVH Guide, showing memorial on cover
- Interactive map of Liberation
- Location: Liberty State Park, New Jersey
- Coordinates: 40.6927°N 74.0558°W
- Designer: Nathan Rapoport
- Material: Bronze
- Height: 15 ft (4.6 m)
- Completion date: 1985
- Opening date: May 30, 1985

Liberation is a bronze Holocaust memorial created by the sculptor Nathan Rapoport, located in Liberty State Park in Jersey City, in Hudson County, New Jersey, United States. Officially dedicated on May 30, 1985, the monument portrays an American soldier, carrying the body of a Holocaust survivor out of a Nazi concentration camp.

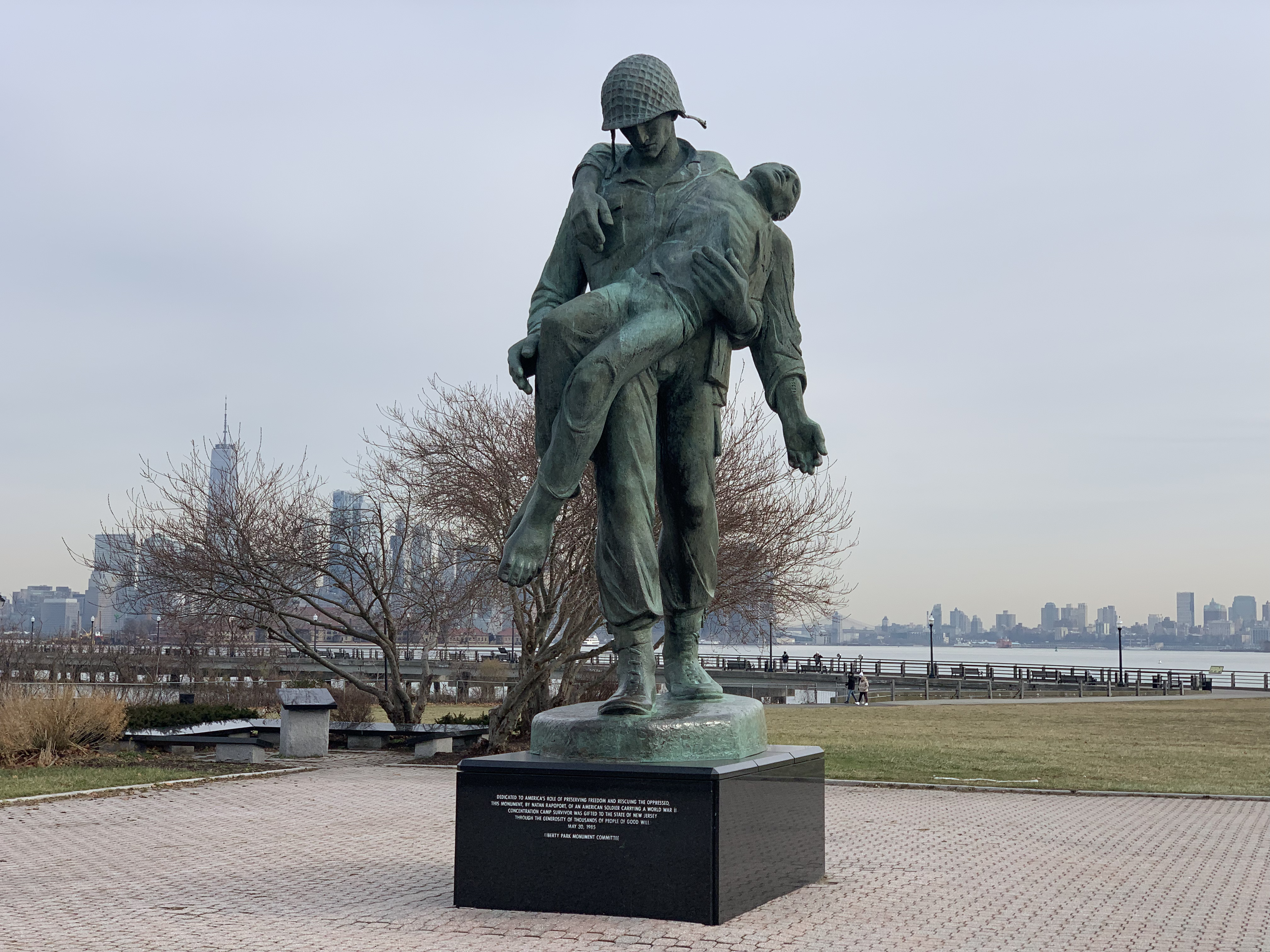
Liberation Memorial

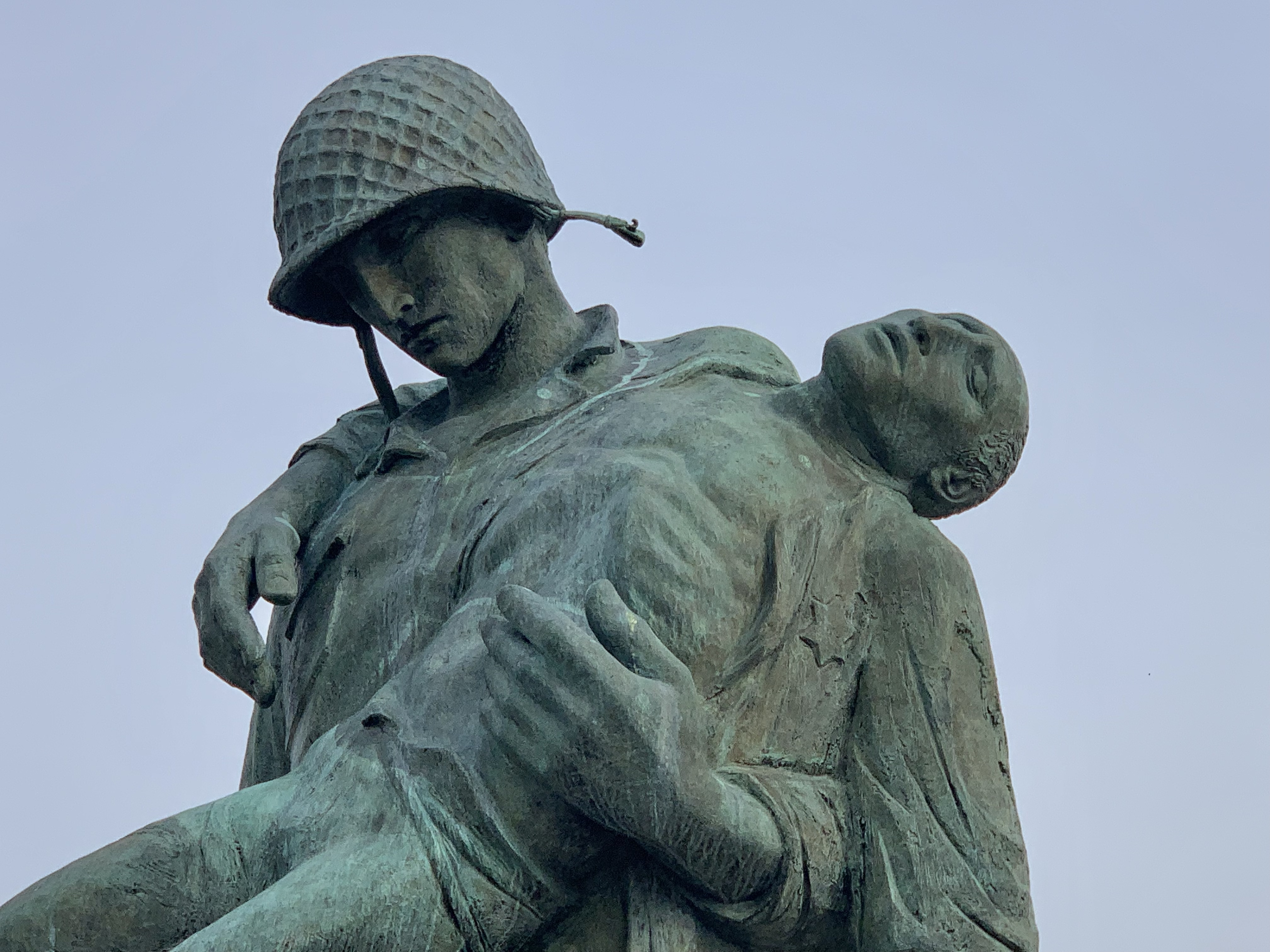
Liberation Memorial

== Background ==
This memorial sculpture was commissioned by the State of New Jersey and sponsored by a coalition of veterans organizations. It was strategically located so that it would face the Statue of Liberty and form a "topological triad" that would include Liberation, Liberty Island, and Ellis Island. According to at least one scholar, the inclusion of the monument in this "triad" is to recognize the Holocaust as a "counterpoint" to "American democratic and egalitarian ideals," in the same way the U.S. Holocaust Memorial Museum in Washington, D.C. serves as counterpoint to the values embodied in other national monuments.

The monument is fifteen feet tall and weighs approximately two tons. It recalls America's self-perception in terms of the role of the U.S. military in the liberation of the camps, and as a refuge for many survivors. The Liberty Park Monument Committee, formed by New Jersey Governor Thomas Kean, was tasked with raising funds for a monument "to honor American servicemen as liberators of oppressed peoples." The official State resolution issued on the day of the monument's dedication noted that, "our service members fought, not to conquer or to be aggressors, but rather to rescue and restore freedom to those persecuted and oppressed by the fascist powers."

=== Department of Defense Holocaust Remembrance Guide ===
The U.S. Department of Defense (DOD) Guide to Observances for the Days of Remembrance of the Victims of the Holocaust includes a photo of the monument on its cover, and a description of the monument's message on the inside cover:

[Rapoport's] artistic goal was to embody in bronze a daring vision: in the face of sorrow and tragedies, he asserted that hope can triumph despite atrocity.... Liberation depicts an American soldier carrying a survivor out of a concentration camp. The chests of the rescuer and rescued are joined, as if sharing one heart. The way that the survivor's body is cradled in the arms of his liberator reflects comfort and trust. Liberation is a testament to the Americans who liberated the camps, and it is a memorial to those who perished. But it is also a symbol of the strong helping the weak, not persecuting them. It is a vision of one human being supporting another. It is a tribute to the best of America's dreams: freedom, compassion, bravery, and -- above all -- hope.

On April 10, 1988, a copy of the DOD Guide was presented to Governor Kean during a special Holocaust ceremony held at the monument. The book was the idea of U.S. Navy chaplain Rabbi Arnold E. Resnicoff, who spoke at the ceremony and made the presentation. At the ceremony, a copy of the Guide was also presented to General Francis Gerard, a veteran of World War II, and Commander of the New Jersey Department of Defense.

== Meaning beyond the Holocaust ==
Commentators have noted that this monument, although directly linked to the Holocaust as an historical event, has taken on larger meaning as a reminder of America's positive role in the world. Governor Kean's speech at the monument's dedication sought to "resist the skepticism about America's place in the world," as he proclaimed that the monument affirmed his "American heritage" and caused him to feel "deep pride in his American values." He continued:

The monument says that we, as a collective people, stand for freedom. We, as Americans, are not oppressors, and we, as Americans, do not engage in armed conflict for the purpose of conquest. Our role in the world is to preserve that precious, precious thing that we consider to be a free democracy. Today we will remember those who gave their lives for freedom.
