= The Holocaust and the United Nations Outreach Programme =

United Nations General Assembly resolution 60/7 on Holocaust remembrance called for the establishment of a programme of outreach on the subject of the "Holocaust and the United Nations" and measures to mobilize civil society for Holocaust remembrance and education, in order to help to prevent future acts of genocide. Since its establishment by the Department of Public Information in January 2006, the Holocaust and the United Nations Outreach Programme has developed an international network of civil society groups and a multi-faceted programme that includes: innovative online educational products, youth outreach, DVDs, seminars and training programmes, a film series, book signings, a permanent exhibit at United Nations Headquarters in New York City, and the annual worldwide observance of the International Day of Commemoration in memory of the victims of the Holocaust.

The Programme has worked closely with Holocaust survivors to ensure that their stories are heard and heeded as a warning of the consequences of anti-Semitism and other forms of discrimination. It continues to combat Holocaust denial, also called for in General Assembly resolution 61/255. In all of its activities, with students around the world in particular, the Holocaust Programme draws essential links between the underlying causes of genocide, the lessons to be learned from the Holocaust and the promotion of human rights and democratic values today.

== The International Day of Commemoration in memory of the victims of the Holocaust ==
The International Day of Commemoration in memory of the victims of the Holocaust is observed each year on 27 January in the General Assembly Hall at United Nations Headquarters in New York City with a memorial ceremony on the theme "Remembrance and Beyond", which serves to highlight and connect the two main elements of the Programme – remembering the victims of the Holocaust and helping to prevent future acts of genocide. The International Day is also widely observed with ceremonies and activities at UN offices around the world.

== Educational materials ==
The Holocaust and the United Nations Outreach Programme supports the development of educational curricula by Member States on the lessons of the Holocaust in a number of ways. In cooperation with leading institutions on Holocaust studies, the Programme has developed a wide variety of educational tools. All are available and free upon request, and in all UN official languages - Arabic, Chinese, English, French, Russian and Spanish. The Programme's latest products are a study guide and companion DVD for high school students entitled "Women and the Holocaust: Courage and Compassion" and serve to better our understanding of women's experiences during the Holocaust.

Other educational materials include the Discussion Papers Journal Series, which contains papers drafted by prominent experts on the Holocaust and genocide, among them Madame Simone Veil, Professor Yehuda Bauer, and Elie Wiesel. This publication provides a forum for scholars and experts on Holocaust and genocide from around the world to raise issues for debate and further study amongst secondary school and university students. The Programme also developed The Footprints for Hope initiative, which includes a short educational film titled "Footprints: Discovering the Holocaust through Historical Artefacts", a power-point presentation and a lesson plan. These tools are designed for educators to introduce and explore the history of the Holocaust with primary school children through a discussion about an historical artefact, a child's shoe found at Auschwitz-Birkenau.

The Programme's gateway website also offers a number of innovative information products and teaching resources on the Holocaust and prevention of genocide, such as teachers' guidelines, the Electronic Notes for Speakers (an online pedagogical tool that provides concise, detailed information on the history and human experience of the Holocaust), etc.

== Panel discussions ==
The Holocaust and the United Nations Outreach Programme has organized seven panel discussions to date on the topic of Holocaust awareness and genocide prevention attended by Member States, non-governmental organizations, students, educators and United Nations staff members.

1) The first panel discussion took place on 12 May 2006, organized with United States Holocaust Memorial Museum (USHMM), Yad Vashem, Levande Historia and the Office for Democratic Institutions and Human Rights of the Organization for Security and Co-operation in Europe (OSCE) The seminar examined communication tools and educational resources on issues related to the Holocaust and genocide studies.

2) The Deputy Permanent Representative of Sierra Leone, the former Special Adviser to the Secretary-General on Children and Armed Conflict, the New York Office of the High Commissioner for Human Rights, and the Executive Director of the Institute for the study of genocide in New York, joined the Chair of the Secretary-General's Advisory Committee on Genocide Prevention in a seminar held on 14 September 2006, which explored the causes of genocide and the role of the United Nations in helping to prevent it.

3) The third seminar, on "Combating Hatred" with the participation of the Special Adviser of the Secretary-General on the Prevention of Genocide, was held on 8 November 2007, the eve of the anniversary of the Kristallnacht Pogrom. The roundtable discussion featured speakers from civil society who shared best practices to overcome hatred, prejudice and intolerance in society.

4) The fourth seminar, "Saving Succeeding Generations", was held on 26 June 2008 in collaboration with the United Nations University New York Office. The panelists included the Special Adviser to the United Nations Secretary-General on the Responsibility to Protect, representatives of Yad Vashem and USHMM, who engaged the audience in a discussion on individual and collective responsibility to protect those threatened by genocide and other crimes against humanity.

5) In observance of the 70th Anniversary of the Kristallnacht pogrom, the Holocaust Programme organized a panel discussion on the theme "Nowhere to turn" on 10 November 2008 at the United Nations Headquarters. Holocaust scholars from New York University, the Centre for Jewish Studies of Shanghai and CUNY School of Law, as well as the Permanent Representative of Israel to the United Nations discussed the events on 9 November 1938, known as Kristallnacht, and their aftermath.

6) A seminar on "Learning about the Holocaust through Art" was held on 9 November 2009 in observance of the anniversary of the Kristallnacht pogrom. This special event, which included remarks by the Deputy Director of the Outreach Division and two of the artists depicted in the film titled As Seen through These Eyes, launched the Programme's publication of the Discussion Papers Journal, and was dedicated to highlighting Holocaust education through art.

7) On 20 May, the Holocaust Programme organized a one-day educators' workshop on fostering human rights defenders within the community. The two-part event included an interactive discussion with the Special Adviser to the Secretary-General on the Prevention of Genocide and a leading human rights activist, drawing on examples of racial discrimination during the Nazi era as well as contemporary cases of mass violence; and a workshop led by the Holocaust Programme and Facing History and Ourselves.

== United Nations Information Centres ==
The Holocaust and the United Nations Outreach Programme provides the global network of United Nations Information Centres Services (UNIS) and Offices (UNOs) in over 60 countries with guidelines on Holocaust Remembrance Day, teaching materials on the Holocaust and its underlying issues, and ongoing guidance on related topics to promote the lessons of the Holocaust in order to help to prevent future acts of genocide. Every year, the United Nations Information Centres observe the International Day of Commemoration with civil society groups and government representatives.

== Partnerships ==
The Holocaust and the United Nations Outreach Programme also collaborates with partners to identify ways to engage contemporary society in learning from the lessons of the Holocaust. In 2007 and 2008, the Holocaust Programme partnered with Holocaust institutions to organize four week-long regional seminars, designed to enhance the knowledge and skills of local level staff at the United Nations Information Centres worldwide in the areas of the Holocaust remembrance, human rights and the prevention of genocide. In 2009, the Holocaust Programme partnered with Paul Salmons of the Holocaust Education Development Programme at the University of London and Cornelia Reetz of the United Kingdom Holocaust Centre in producing the Footprints for Hope Project. This project brought the United Nations Information Centres and local schools together to stimulate interest among the students to learn about the Holocaust. In 2010 the Holocaust Programme, in partnership with the Anne Frank Center USA, launched a Twitter campaign in memory of Anne Frank, who perished in the Holocaust. Students from all over the world "tweeted" messages of support to Anne and shared their thoughts about what they have learned from her life.

== Exhibits ==
The Holocaust and the United Nations Outreach Programme helps to facilitate the organization of temporary exhibitions on Holocaust-related topics every year during the week of 27 January, the International Day of Commemoration in memory of the victims of the Holocaust.

In 2011, the Holocaust Programme helped to organize two exhibitions: The Memories Live On, which features the drawings of Auschwitz made by an unknown prisoner of the concentration and death camp and focuses on the legacy of the survivors to young people; and Hélène Berr, A Stolen Life, which presents the persecution of Jews in Occupied France during World War II through the journal by this young woman who died in Bergen-Belsen concentration camp in 1945.

The Programme unveiled the permanent exhibit on the "Holocaust and the United Nations" at United Nations Headquarters in January 2008. The exhibit, developed with the assistance of Holocaust scholars, presents an overview of the Holocaust in the context of World War II and the founding of the United Nations. It is seen by the 400,000 visitors who visit United Nations Headquarters annually.

== Film screenings ==
The Holocaust and the United Nations Outreach Programme has screened a dozen documentary and feature films on the Holocaust and the prevention of genocide. Many of the films have been shown both at the United Nations Headquarters in New York and in several United Nations Information Centres around the world.

The British film The Relief of Belsen was screened on 2 May 2011 in partnership with the United Kingdom Mission to the United Nations. The film tells the true story of the massive humanitarian effort by the British army in liberating Bergen-Belsen concentration camp in April 1945.

During the 2011 Holocaust Remembrance week, the Programme screened the documentary film Daring to Resist, which features the stories of three young Jewish women who fought back against the Nazis during the Holocaust.
