= United Nations Holocaust Memorial =

On 27 January 2005, the United Nations General Assembly held a special session in remembrance of the liberation of the Auschwitz concentration camp on the same day of 1945. This is the first time that the international organization made a remembrance of victims of the Holocaust as a way to prevent future genocides. Also, the General Assembly declared January 27 as the International Day in Memory of the Victims of the Holocaust.

On 27 January in 2011 they paid tribute to the suffering of women, and in 2012 to the child Holocaust victims, with the screening of the film The Last Flight of Petr Ginz following the story of Petr Ginz, who fought against their persecutors with art and writings. In 2016, the theme for the Holocaust Memorial Ceremony was chosen as 'The Holocaust and Human Dignity' and the commemoration events and activities included the screening of the film Woman in Gold which threw light on the plight of Jewish families in Nazi-occupied Europe.

== See also ==
- Holocaust Memorial Days
