= Holocaust Memorial Day and Genocide Remembrance Act =

The Holocaust Memorial Day and Genocide Remembrance Act is a law passed in the Alberta Legislature with unanimous consent of all parties in November 2000. This law provides recognition for Yom HaShoah (Holocaust Memorial Day) that falls in April/May according to the Jewish lunar calendar. This act will signal a free day from all school and work for the day.
