= Yom HaShoah =

Israel's day of commemoration for the Jews murdered in the Holocaust

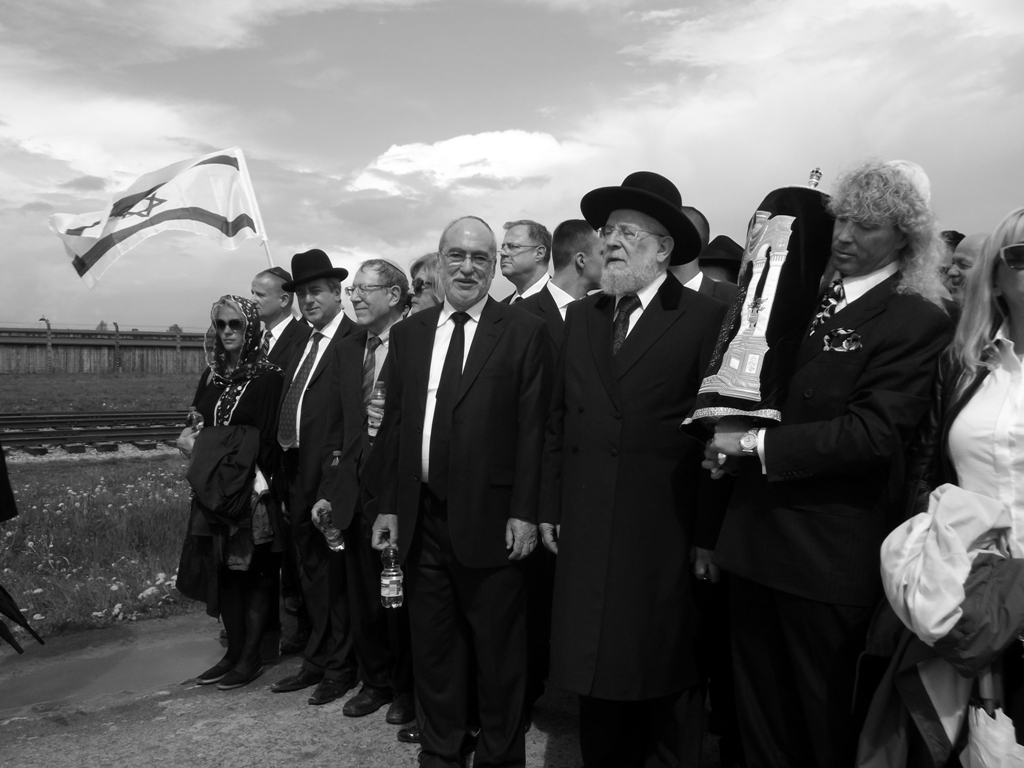
- "March of the Living" at Auschwitz, 2014
- Also called: Yom HaZikaron laShoah ve-laG'vurah; Holocaust Remembrance Day
- Observed by: State of Israel; Many Jews elsewhere
- Type: Jewish (national)
- Significance: Commemorating the six million Jews murdered in the Holocaust, and the heroism of survivors and rescuers
- Observances: Flags lowered to half-mast, public places of entertainment closed; national opening ceremony and closing ceremonies; siren at 10:00 a.m. signaling the start of two minutes of silence
- Date: 27th day of Nisan (Note: If the 27th day of Nisan falls on a Friday, the day is commemorated on Thursday, the 26th day of Nisan. If the 27th day of Nisan falls on a Sunday, the day is commemorated on Monday, the 28th day of Nisan.)
- 2025 date: Sunset, 23 April – nightfall, 24 April
- 2026 date: Sunset, 13 April – nightfall, 14 April
- 2027 date: Sunset, 3 May – nightfall, 4 May
- 2028 date: Sunset, 23 April – nightfall, 24 April

Yom HaZikaron laShoah ve-laG'vurah (Hebrew: יום הזיכרון לשואה ולגבורה, lit. 'Holocaust and Heroism Remembrance Day'), known colloquially in Israel and abroad as Yom HaShoah (Hebrew: יום השואה, Yiddish: יום השואה) and in English as Holocaust Remembrance Day, or Holocaust Day, is Israel's day of commemoration for the approximately six million Jews murdered in the Holocaust by Nazi Germany and its allies, and for the Jewish resistance in that period. In Israel, it is a national memorial day, and several Jewish communities around the world observe it as well. The first official commemorations took place in 1951, and the observance of the day was anchored in a law passed by the Knesset in 1959. It is held on the 27th of Nisan (which falls in April or May), unless the 27th would be adjacent to the Jewish Sabbath, in which case the date is shifted by a day.

== Origins ==
=== Rabbinate-instituted day (1949–1950) ===
The first Holocaust Remembrance Day in Israel took place on December 28, 1949, following a decision of the Chief Rabbinate of Israel that an annual memorial should take place on the Tenth of Tevet, a traditional day of mourning and fasting in the Hebrew calendar. The day was marked by the burial in a Jerusalem cemetery of ashes and bones of thousands of Jews brought from the Flossenbürg concentration camp and religious ceremonies held in honor of the victims. A radio program on the Holocaust was broadcast that evening. The following year, in December 1950, the Rabbinate, organizations of former European Jewish communities and the Israel Defense Forces held memorial ceremonies around the country; they mostly involved funerals, in which objects such as desecrated Torah scrolls and the bones and ashes of the dead brought from Europe were interred.

=== Knesset-instituted day (1951–1958) ===
In 1951, the Knesset began deliberations to choose a date for Holocaust Remembrance Day. On April 12, 1951, after also considering as possibilities the Tenth of Tevet, the 14th of Nisan, which is the day before Passover and the day on which the Warsaw Ghetto Uprising (April 19, 1943) began, and September 1, the date on which the Second World War began, the Knesset passed a resolution establishing 27 Nisan in the Hebrew calendar, a week after Passover, and eight days before Israel Independence Day as the annual Holocaust and Ghetto Uprising Remembrance Day.

On May 3, 1951, the first officially organized Holocaust Remembrance Day event was held at the Chamber of the Holocaust on Mount Zion; the Israel Postal Service issued a special commemorative envelope; and a bronze statue of Mordechai Anielewicz, the leader of the Warsaw Ghetto revolt, was unveiled at Yad Mordechai, a kibbutz named for him. From the following year, the lighting of six beacons in memory of the six million Jews murdered by the Nazis became a standard feature of the official commemoration of Holocaust Memorial Day.

=== Martyrs' and Heroes' Remembrance Day Law (1959) ===
On April 8, 1959, the Knesset officially established the day when it passed the Martyrs' and Heroes' Remembrance Day Law to institute an annual "commemoration of the disaster which the Nazis and their collaborators brought upon the Jewish people and the acts of heroism and revolt performed." The law was signed by the prime minister of Israel, David Ben-Gurion, and the president of Israel, Yitzhak Ben-Zvi. It established that the day would be observed by a two-minute silence when all work would come to a halt throughout the country, memorial gatherings and commemorative events in public and educational institutions would be held, flags would be flown at half mast, and programs relevant to the day would be presented on the radio and in places of entertainment. An amendment to the law in 1961 mandated that cafes, restaurants, and clubs be closed on this day.

== Commemoration ==
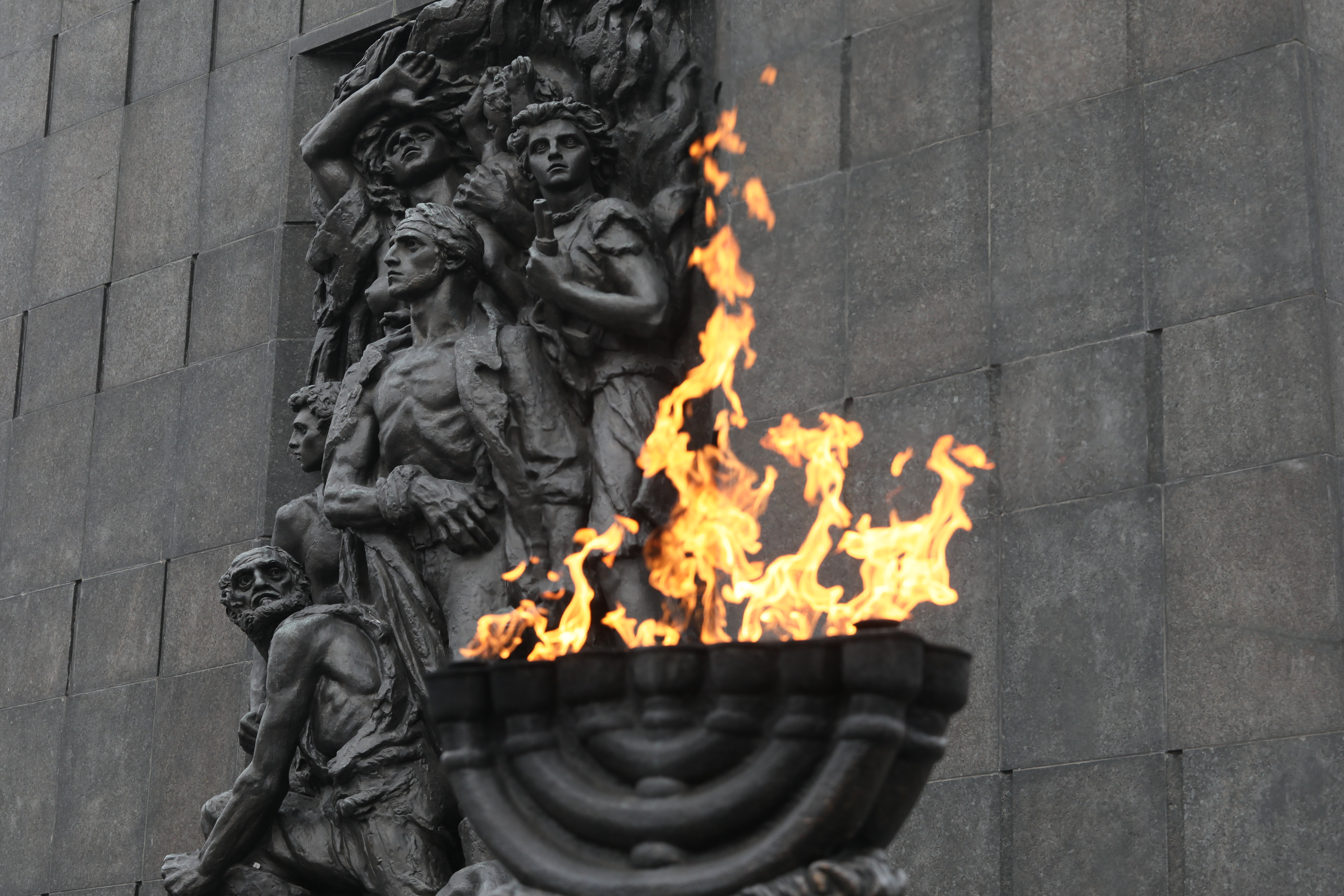
Holocaust Remembrance Day

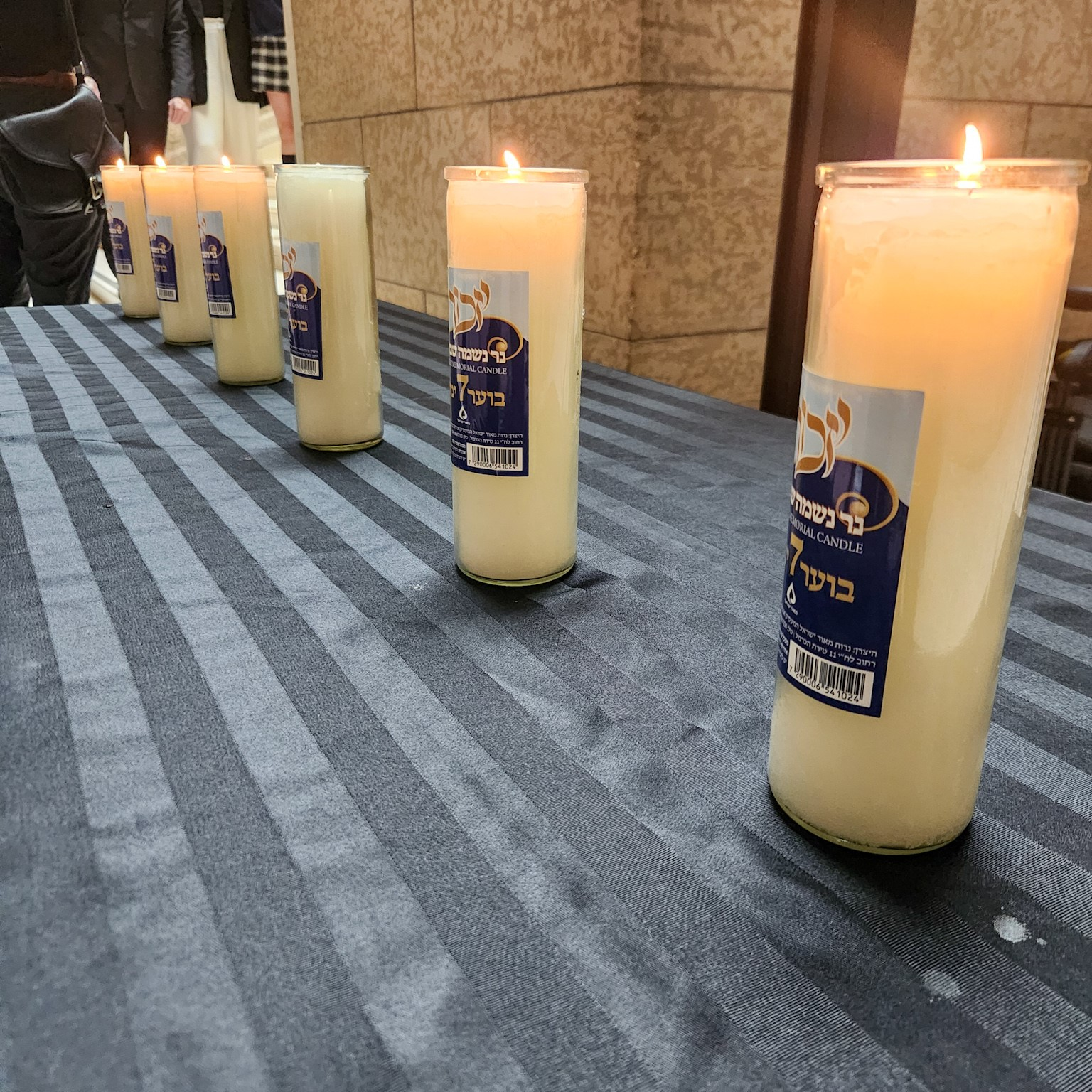
Yom HaShoah

=== Israel ===
==== Date ====
The date is set per the Hebrew calendar, on 27 Nisan, so that it varies regarding the Gregorian calendar. Observance of the day is moved back to the Thursday before, if 27 Nisan falls on a Friday (as in 2021 or 2025), or forward a day, if 27 Nisan falls on a Sunday (to avoid adjacency with the Jewish Sabbath, as in 2024). The fixed Jewish calendar ensures 27 Nisan does not fall on Saturday.

==== Evening ====
Yom HaShoah opens in Israel at sundown in a state ceremony held in Warsaw Ghetto Square at Yad Vashem, the Holocaust Martyrs' and Heroes Authority, in Jerusalem. During the ceremony the national flag is lowered to half mast, the President and the Prime Minister both deliver speeches, Holocaust survivors light six torches symbolizing the approximately six million Jews murdered in the Holocaust and the Chief Rabbis recite prayers.

==== Daytime ====
On Yom HaShoah, ceremonies and services are held at schools, military bases and by other public and community organizations.

On the eve of Yom HaShoah and the day itself, places of public entertainment are closed by law. Israeli television airs Holocaust documentaries and Holocaust-related talk shows, and low-key songs are played on the radio. Flags on public buildings are flown at half mast. At 10:00 a.m., an air raid siren sounds throughout the country and Israelis are expected to observe two minutes of solemn reflection. It is customary to pause what is being done and to reflect, including motorists who stop their cars in the middle of the road, standing beside their vehicles in silence as the siren is sounded.

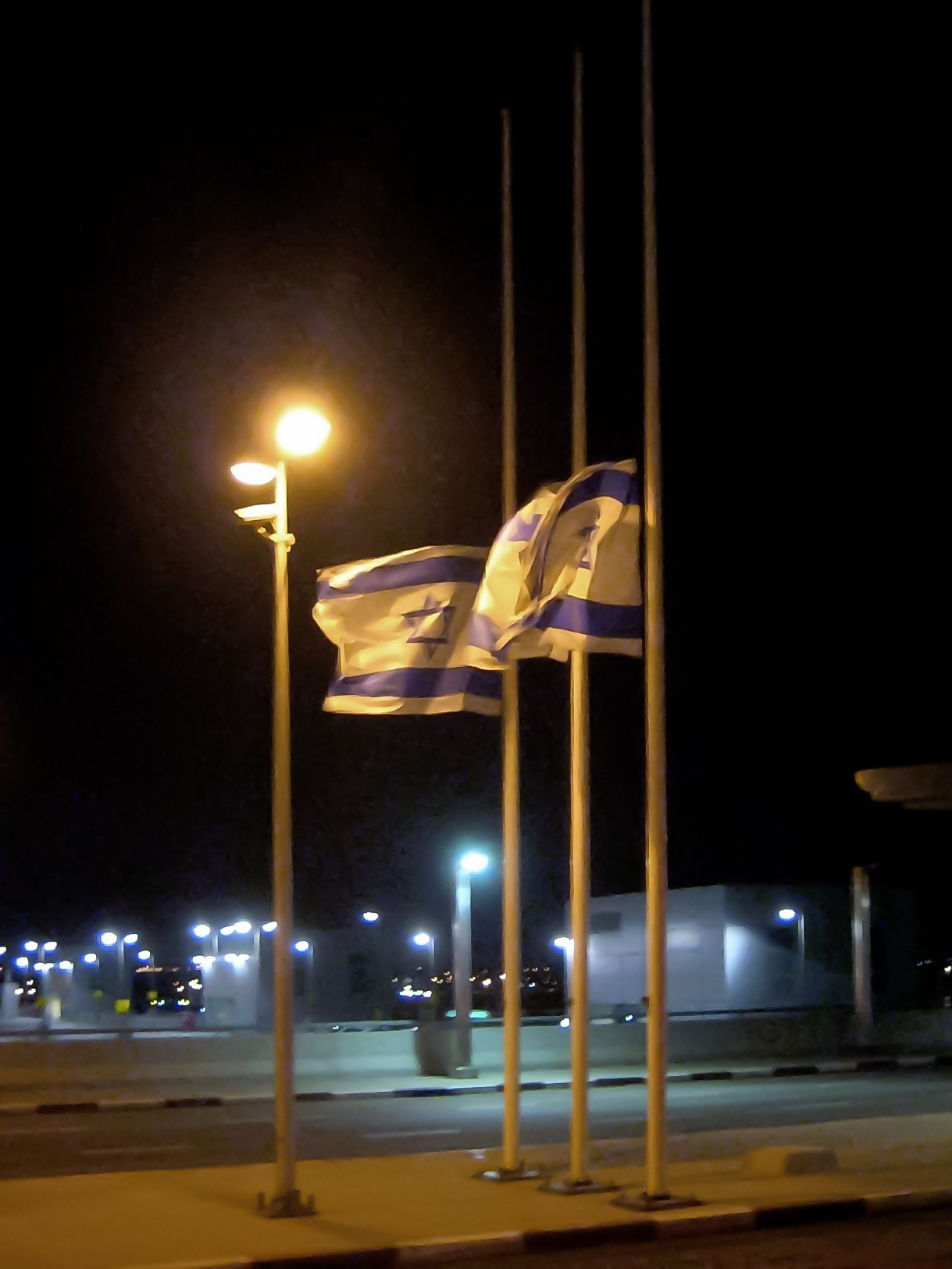
Flags at half mast at sundown on Yom HaShoah

Sirens blare at 10:00 a.m. as motorists exit their cars and stand in silence in front of the Prime Minister's House in Jerusalem and throughout Israel on Yom HaShoah.

Video: Two minutes of silence in Tel Aviv

=== Abroad ===
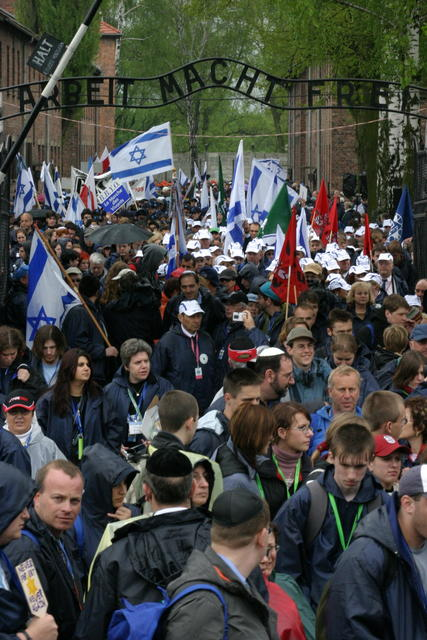
The March of the Living from Auschwitz to Birkenau is held annually on Yom HaShoah.

Jewish communities and individuals throughout the world commemorate Yom HaShoah in synagogues as well as in the broader Jewish community. Many hold their commemorative ceremonies on the closest Sunday to Yom HaShoah as a more practical day for people to attend, while some mark the day on April 19, the anniversary of the Warsaw Ghetto uprising. Jewish schools also hold Holocaust-related educational programs on or near Yom HaShoah.

Commemorations typically include memorial services and communal vigils, and educational programs. These programs often include talks by Holocaust survivors (although this is becoming less common as time passes and there are fewer survivors who remain alive), candle-lighting ceremonies, the recitation of memorial prayers, the Mourner's Kaddish and appropriate songs and readings. Some communities read the names of Holocaust victims or show Holocaust-themed films.

Since 1988 in Poland, a memorial service has been held after a three-kilometer walk by thousands of participants from Auschwitz to Birkenau in what has become known as "The March of the Living".

Yom HaShoah is also commemorated by Australian Jews. In 2022, Treasurer Josh Frydenberg, who is Jewish, commemorated Yom HaShoah at the Melbourne Hebrew Congregation on the synagogue's 180th anniversary.

While in Europe Holocaust Remembrance Day is celebrated on the anniversary of the liberation of Auschwitz concentration camp by the Soviet Red Army in 1945, the Israeli government chose to commemorate a day that honored Jewish resistance and heroism in the face of the Nazi genocide.

== Religious observances and liturgy ==
In the last few decades, all the prayerbooks of Conservative and Reform Judaism have developed similar liturgies to be used on Yom HaShoah. The siddurim of these groups add passages that are meant to be added to standard weekday service, as well as stand-alone sections. These liturgies generally include:

- Lighting of a candle (often, each member of the congregation lights one)
- Modern poems, including "I believe in the sun even when it is not shining..."
- El Malei Rahamim (God, full of mercy, dwelling on high)
- Mourner's Kaddish

In response to the lack of liturgy dedicated to Yom HaShoah, Daniel Gross composed, in 2009, I Believe: A Shoah Requiem, a complete musical liturgy dedicated to the observance of Yom HaShoah. An a cappella oratorio scored for cantor, soprano solo, adult chorus and children's chorus, I Believe features several traditional prayer texts such as the Mourner's Kaddish (Kaddish Yatom) and the El Malei memorial prayer, and also includes the poetry of Paul Celan and Primo Levi. On April 7, 2013, I Believe had its world premiere presentation at Orchestra Hall at the Max M. Fisher Music Center in Detroit, Michigan.

=== Orthodox Judaism ===
While there are Orthodox Jews who commemorate the Holocaust on Yom HaShoah, others in the Orthodox community, especially Haredim, including Hasidim, remember the victims of the Holocaust in their daily prayers and on traditional days of mourning that were already in place before the Holocaust, such as Tisha B'Av in the summer, and the Tenth of Tevet in the winter, because in the Jewish tradition the month of Nisan is considered a joyous month associated with Passover and messianic redemption. The moment of silence is purposely ignored by some because of the non-Jewish origins of this sort of memorial. Some Haredi rabbis recommend adding piyyutim (religious poems) about the Holocaust to the liturgy of Tisha B’Av; some adherents follow this advice.

=== Conservative Judaism ===
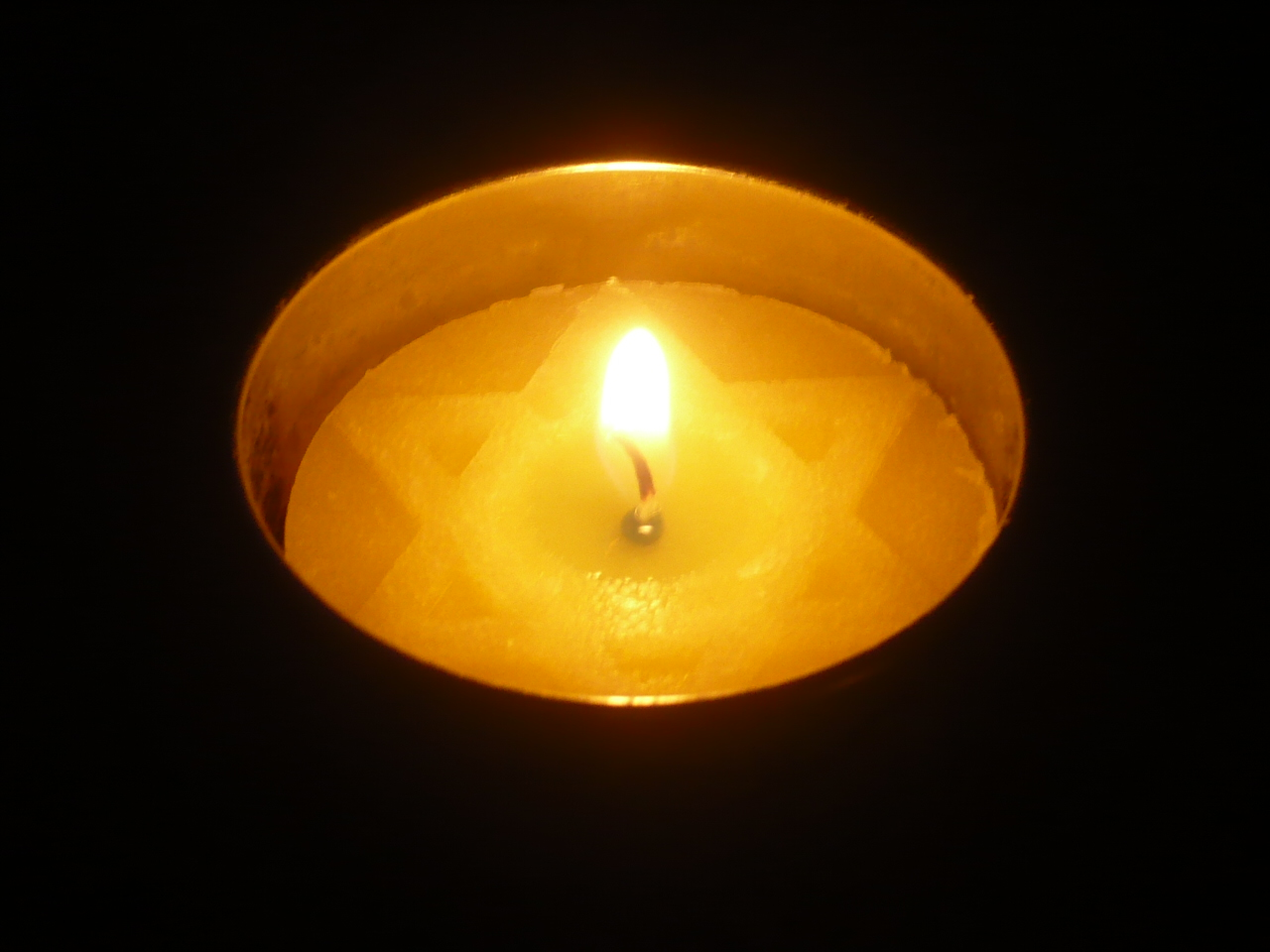
A lit Yom HaShoah Yellow Candle

In 1981, members of the Federation of Jewish Men's Clubs FJMC, a branch of the mainstream Conservative/Masorti movement, created a special memorial project specifically for Yom HaShoah. A dedicated yahrzeit candle was conceived, with yellow wax and a barbed-wire Star of David logo reminiscent of the armbands Jews were forced to wear during the Holocaust. This object has come to be known as the Yellow Candle. Approximately 200,000 candles are distributed around the world each year, along with relevant prayers and meditations.

In 1984, Conservative Rabbi David Golinkin wrote an article in Conservative Judaism journal suggesting a program of observance for the day, including fasting. In his article, he noted that while private fasts are indeed prohibited during the month of Nisan (a major Orthodox objection to the placement of the day), communal fasts for tragedies befalling Jewish communities had indeed been declared throughout the pre-modern period.

Another prominent Conservative Jewish figure shared the Orthodox sentiment about not adopting Yom HaShoah. Ismar Schorsch, former Chancellor of Conservative Judaism's Jewish Theological Seminary of America held that Holocaust commemoration should take place on Tisha b'Av.

The Masorti (Conservative) movement in Israel has created Megillat HaShoah, a scroll and liturgical reading for Yom HaShoah. This publication was a joint project of Jewish leaders in Israel, the United States, and Canada.

In 2011, the FJMC introduced a related Yellow Candle concept for use on Kristallnacht (The Night of Shattered Glass), November 9–10, commemorating the first organised Nazi pogrom of Jews in 1938, and other important Shoah commemoration dates. Called the Ner Katan, FJMC's new version consists of six Yellow Candles provided for communal observances and ceremonies.

More recently, Conservative rabbis and lay leaders in the US, Israel, and Canada collaborated to write Megillat Hashoah (The Holocaust Scroll). It contains personal recollections of Holocaust survivors. A responsum was written by Rabbi Golinkin expressing the view that not only is it legitimate for the modern Jewish community to write a new scroll of mourning, but it is also incumbent to do so.

=== Reform Judaism ===
Reform Jewish congregations have tended to commemorate the memory of the Holocaust either on International Holocaust Remembrance Day or on Yom HaShoah. These commemorations of the Holocaust have used a ceremony that is loosely modeled after a Passover Seder. The focus of the seder has changed with time. The earlier Holocaust seders commemorated the losses of the Holocaust through a reenactment events from the Holocaust and through the lighting of six yahrzeit candles to reflect the approximately 6 million Jews murdered. More modern Haggadot for Yom HaShoah, such as Gathering from the Whirlwind, have concentrated on renewal, remembrance, and the continuity of Jewish life.

In 1988, the American Reform movement published Six Days of Destruction (Elie Wiesel and Rabbi Albert Friedlander). Narratives from Holocaust survivors are juxtaposed with the six days of creation found in Genesis.

== Gregorian dates ==
These are the upcoming dates of observance of Yom HaShoah. Note that the observance begins at sundown on the indicated date and proceeds through sundown of the following day.

- 2026: Monday, April 13
- 2027: Monday, May 3
- 2028: Sunday, April 23
- 2029: Wednesday, April 11

== See also ==
- Days of Remembrance of the Victims of the Holocaust
- Holocaust Memorial Day
