= Fear: Anti-Semitism in Poland after Auschwitz =

2006 book by Jan T. Gross

Fear
- Author: Jan T. Gross
- Original title: Fear: Anti-Semitism in Poland after Auschwitz: An Essay in Historical Interpretation
- Subject: Post-war anti-Jewish violence in Poland
- Genre: History
- Set in: Republic of Poland
- Publisher: Random House, Princeton University Press
- Publication date: 2006
- Media type: Book
- Preceded by: Neighbors
- Followed by: Golden Harvest

Fear: Anti-Semitism in Poland after Auschwitz: An Essay in Historical Interpretation, is a book by Jan T. Gross, published by Random House and Princeton University Press in 2006. An edited Polish version was published in 2008 by Znak Publishers in Kraków as Strach: antysemityzm w Polsce tuż po wojnie: historia moralnej zapaści (Fear: Antisemitism in Poland shortly after the war: the history of a moral fall). In the book, Gross explores the issues concerning incidents of post-war anti-Jewish violence in Poland, with particular focus on the 1946 Kielce pogrom. Fear has received international attention and reviews in major newspapers; receiving both praise and criticism.

== Content ==
Gross begins the English version of Fear with a chapter summarizing the devastation of Poland during World War II, including the physical destruction of Poland's Jews; the initial partition of the country between Joseph Stalin and Adolf Hitler; the subsequent Nazi crimes; the Katyn massacre of Polish Army officers by the Soviets; the Warsaw Uprising of 1944; the Soviet decision to postpone their advance until the German Army had defeated the Polish Armia Krajowa, which resulted in the total destruction of Warsaw, and finally, the abandonment of Poland by the Western Allies at the Yalta Conference, knowingly consigning it to Soviet communist domination.

Gross estimates that approximately 250,000 Polish Jews returned home at the end of the war. In his chapter "The Unwelcoming of Jewish Survivors," Gross describes how returning Polish Jews were subjected to a wave of violence and hostility, with up to 1500 murdered either individually or in pogroms. Often they would find their property occupied by non-Jewish Poles or taken over by the communist government, which nationalized much of the Polish economy. According to Gross, the expropriation of Jewish property continued a trend that occurred throughout the war years, with non-Jewish Poles acquiring the property of Polish Jews who were sent off to extermination camps, and in some instances, carrying out the killings themselves. Gross describes how the looting of property extended to digging through the ashes of Treblinka for gold fillings. He discusses the alienation, hostile atmosphere, and violence experienced by some Jews and the inability of Polish elites to prevent it. Gross makes additional claims about the Kielce pogrom, arguing that the crime was initiated not by a mob, but by the police, and that it involved people from every walk of life except the highest level of government officials in the city.

According to a Piast Institute online summary, Gross concludes by writing that some Poles, especially in rural areas, participated in the Nazi wartime effort to annihilate and despoil the Jews, which was the cause of postwar antisemitism in Poland. The fear of punishment for their own crimes, according to Gross, was what drove them to continue attacking Jews after the war. Historian David Engel describes the following quote as a "summation of [Gross'] basic thesis:"

We must seek the reasons for the novel, virulent quality of postwar anti-Semitism in Poland not in collective hallucinations nor in prewar attitudes, but in actual experiences acquired during the war years.... Living Jews embodied the massive failure of character and reason on the part of their Polish neighbors and constituted by mere presence both a reminder and a threat that they might need to account for themselves.

The Polish version of Fear differed from its English original because Gross assumed that his Polish readers were familiar with the tragic history of wartime Poland. The first chapter of the English version was replaced by a chapter documenting Polish awareness of the genocide of the Jews. Fear includes several photographs taken by Julia Pirotte.

== Reception ==
=== United States ===
Fear received positive reviews in several American magazines and newspapers, including The New York Times, The Washington Post, the Los Angeles Times, and The Boston Globe.

David Margolick, writing in The New York Times Book Review, took issue with Gross' thesis that the murders of Jews in post-war Poland was inspired by feelings of guilt on the part of Poles, positing instead that perhaps "through their own state-of-the-art anti-Semitism, the Germans emboldened many Poles to act upon what they had always felt," taking as credible "Nazi accounts of Judenjagd, or 'Jew hunts,' [which] detailed how Poles pitched in to find any stray Jews the Germans somehow managed to miss."

Elie Wiesel, reviewing the book in The Washington Post, rejected the notion of collective guilt but noted that Gross' book impels Poland to confront its past. In response to Wiesel's review, Polish-Jewish journalist Adam Michnik wrote in a leading Polish daily, Gazeta Wyborcza (of which he is editor-in-chief), that "Wiesel's review conveys the image of a country unable to confront the plague of anti-Semitism. ... Anyone who writes about anti-Semitism in Poland and ignores those facts, falsifies—even if unintentionally—the truth about Poland." The Washington Post printed a letter to the editor by Janusz Reiter, the Polish ambassador to the United States, who cited Michnik.

Thane Rosenbaum wrote in the Los Angeles Times that the book "should inspire a national reflection on why there are scarcely any Jews left in Poland. According to Deborah E. Lipstadt, Gross built "a meticulous case." David Engel wrote that, unlike Gross' earlier work Neighbors: The Destruction of the Jewish Community in Jedwabne, Poland (2001), in which Gross posited a continuity in the actions of a community of people over generations, in Fear "Gross himself appears to have bracketed off the Nazi era from the longer course of Polish history and by doing so to have altered the terms for reflecting on transgenerational Polish responsibility for past deeds that he set forth in his earlier work." Engel wrote that Gross now sees World War II as a radical break in the history of Polish behavior towards Jews.

=== United Kingdom ===
Anita J. Prazmowska, Professor in International History at the London School for Economics, has described the debate over Gross' book in Poland as "driven by historians with a nationalist agenda that they have pursued since the end of Communism," an agenda in which Jews are portrayed as antagonistic to the existence and interests of the Polish nation and in which their claims to a Polish identity are negated in order to portray communism as an alien creed.

=== Poland ===
In Poland Fear caused controversy and what the German magazine Der Spiegel described as a "right wing backlash," with the book coming under strong criticism by Polish nationalists, the country's conservative establishment as well as some historians.

The book elicited responses from the modern Polish Jewish community. Polish rabbi Burt Schuman, quoted in Der Spiegel, said he welcomed the debate Fear had begun, but described the book as unfairly depicting the country as antisemitic, thus "harming our goal of reconciliation." Marek Edelman, a Jewish leader of the Warsaw Ghetto Uprising against the Nazis, responded to the book by stating that "everything Gross writes about is true" but that postwar violence against Jews was "not about anti-Semitism. ... Murdering Jews was pure banditry, and I wouldn't explain it as anti-Semitism. ... It was contempt for man, for human life, plain meanness. A bandit doesn't attack someone who is stronger, like military troops, but where he sees weakness."

In a letter to the Polish publishers of Fear, Znak, Cardinal Stanisław Dziwisz, former secretary to Pope John Paul II, said Gross' book "awakened the demon" of antisemitism. A Znak spokesperson responded to the complaint by asserting that the issues should be talked about. Znak spokesman Tomasz Miedzik told Der Spiegel "We have the freedom to ask difficult questions about our history and we should do that."

In a televised discussion with Gross, historian Andrzej Paczkowski expressed his discomfort about the speed with which Gross makes generalizations. "Memory and history are two different things," Paczkowski said. "Memory is black and white while history is about shades of gray."

Fear has been criticized by historians such as Paweł Machcewicz, Piotr Gontarczyk, Thaddeus Radzilowski, Janusz Kurtyka, Dariusz Stola, Jan Żaryn and Marek Jan Chodakiewicz. These authors accused Gross of using imperfect methodology, making generalizations, stereotyping, ignoring works which did not confirm his views, neglecting the wider context of the events in that Jews were not a unique subject of persecution and banditry which occurred throughout postwar Europe, misinterpreting or distorting data, relying mostly on Jewish sources, using inflammatory and emotional language, and drawing unsubstantiated conclusions. The book quotes alleged Józef Kuraś' diary, fabricated by Communist activist and journalist Władysław Machejek.

Janusz Kurtyka, the president of the Institute of National Remembrance, in an interview with journalist Konrad Piasecki, stated that Fear has serious methodological errors and omissions and that it makes emotive use of political epithets, and therefore will not be accepted—even conditionally—in the historical community.

Marcin Zaremba, a historian at Warsaw University, described Fear as an important publication. Zaremba told Network Europe radio that he "agree[d] with [Gross'] argument that Poles had their share in the Holocaust," and that "anti-Semitism was a kind of cultural code which Poles used at that time, and that Jews were not responsible for the introduction of communist rule in Poland", however, he also said that Gross often "can't see the forest for the trees", i.e. the hunger, Soviet brutality, and the wartime fear in the hearts of all Polish nationals regardless of faith. In 2012 Zaremba published a book about the years 1944–1947 in Poland (Wielka trwoga), in which he opposed some opinions of Gross.

In response to the coverage of Fear in the Polish daily Rzeczpospolita, Marek Beylin, a columnist for the competing daily Gazeta Wyborcza, called for a "sincere debate about the dark secrets of the Polish past."

Feliks Tych, head of Warsaw's Jewish Historical Institute, criticized Gross for being more of a judge than an analyst, neglecting the impact of the post-war collapse of state institutions, and selectively using facts to support his thesis. Tych also said that "after [Gross'] book, it is no longer possible to escape from the question why there were killings of Jews after the war, and that is his undeniable achievement."

Polish prosecutors reviewed accusations that Fear is slanderous against the Polish nation, but rejected the claims and refused to launch an investigation. The fact that such requests were made became the subject of additional media controversy. The article of the Polish Penal Code that allowed the case to be made in the first place has been criticized by some as infringing upon the right to free speech, and in 2008, the Polish Constitutional Court struck down that provision as unconstitutional.

== See also ==
- History of the Jews in Poland
- Holocaust in Nazi-occupied Poland
- Polish Righteous among the Nations
