= Intermarium: The Land between the Black and Baltic Seas =

2012 book by Marek Jan Chodakiewicz

- Author: Marek Jan Chodakiewicz
- Genre: Non-fiction
- Publication date: 2012

Intermarium: The Land between the Black and Baltic Seas is a 2012 book by Marek Jan Chodakiewicz about the history of Eastern Europe. He had received mixed reviews.

== Reviews ==
Karl A. Roider Jr. reviewed Intermarium for the Sarmatian Review. He describes his main theme as a struggle between the democratic Polish model and the Russian totalitarian model over the Intermarium which per Chodakiewicz's includes the Baltic States, Ukraine, Belarus, and Moldova. While attempting to appeal to an American audience, the book demands the reader know quite a bit about Central and Eastern European history. Further, of him focuses on the post-1989 Intermarium, describing a struggle between patriots and post-communist Russophiles, the latter being described as "in cahoots with Western deconstructionists, feminists, environmentalists, gay rights advocates, nihilists, and postmodernists who are entrenched in American and Western European universities". Roider's review is relatively negative, as he states that "there are conspiracies everywhere in this book, but the author offers no names, no institutions, no objectives, and no strategies" other than undermining the Intermarium's return to the pre-1772 Polish–Lithuanian Commonwealth. Chodakiewicz calls for an alliance between the Eastern European countries to contain Russia, however according to Roider such a call is likely to fall on deaf ears as the United States' attention is focused elsewhere.

Peter Stachura published his more positive review of the book in The Slavonic and East European Review. He calls him an

"impressively ambitious, panoramic examination of a substantial part of Central and Eastern Europe".

Silviu Miloiu's review of the book in Journal of Baltic Studies was also favorable; in his conclusion Miliou's noted that

"On the whole, [he] is one of the most competent and well-written accounts of the Intermarium that I have read. He is based on an impressive range of sources. He sheds new light on historical and present-day processes".

In his critical review of Intermarium in the Israel Journal of Foreign Affairs, Dovid Katz is highly critical of the author, and refers to the book's final chapter as a

"hatchet job against Jewish partisans... [that] resorts to a number of abuses of academic structure to mask the genre of nationalist polemic."

Alexander Prusin reviewing the book for the Slavic Review noted that he seems to be rather derivative of, and of lesser significance and quality to, similar works published recently by scholars such as Timothy Snyder, Kate Brown or Piotr Wandycz although "[he] will certainly find propitious ground among those who favor a new cordon sanitaire in Europe".

Donald E. Pienkos in his review published in The Polish Review in 2018, notes that the book's main argument and "a good point" is that "the intermarium nations comprise a significant outpost of western civilization (versus Russia) and thus merit much more attention than they have ever received" in Western scholarly and political thought. He notes that the historical overview of the region constitutes a "worthy, if not flawless, publication", but is more critical of his polemical part in which "the author castigates western scholars for their alleged ignorance of the region and their [[[Russophilia]]]", concluding that the polemical part significantly lowers the overall quality of the book.
