= Census Information Center =

US Census Bureau data distribution network

The Census Information Center program is part of the U.S. Census Bureau's data dissemination network.

== History ==
The Census Information Center (CIC) Program was started in 1988 to improve access to census data by minority groups and economically disadvantaged segments of the population, who have been traditionally undercounted in censuses and surveys. The original five participating organizations were: The National Urban League, The National Council of La Raza, the William C. Velasquez Institute, the Asian and Pacific Islander American Health Forum and the Americans for Indian Opportunity (replaced by the Native America Public Telecommunications). For more than a decade, from 1988 to April 2000, the CIC program did not grow beyond the original 5 organizations and languished due to a lack of funding and support.

In April 2000, the Census Bureau renewed its commitment to close the minority and economic gap in data access by expanding the CIC Program to include 54 additional organizations representing under-served communities, bringing the number of Program participants to 59 organizations. Funding was made available for training, data products, postage and staff to ensure the success of the Program.

Between 2000 and 2005 15 organizations left the program for various reasons. In September 2006, the Census Bureau admitted an additional 13 organizations.

== Participants ==
- Arab American Institute
- Asian American Federation of New York
- Asian American Studies Center/National CAPACD, University of California, Los Angeles
- Asian American Studies Program, University of Maryland
- Bayamon Central University
- Capital Area Council of Governments
- Center for Applied Research, Norfolk State University
- Center for Business and Economic Research, Louisiana State University in Shreveport
- Center on Pacific Studies Interwork Institute, San Diego State University
- Child Welfare League of America
- Children's Defense Fund
- Dillard University
- Dubois Bunche Center for Public Policy, Medgar Evers College - City University of New York
- First Alaskans Institute
- Florida Agricultural & Mechanical University
- Goodwill Industries International, Inc.
- Howard University
- Indian Affairs Department, State of New Mexico
- Instituto de Investigaciones Interdisciplinarias, University of Puerto Rico at Cayey
- Inter-University Program for Latino Research, Notre Dame University
- Joint Center for Political and Economic Studies
- Leadership Conference on Civil Rights
- LeMoyne-Owen College
- Meharry Medical College
- Metro Chicago Information Center
- Mississippi Urban Research Center, Jackson State University
- NAACP
- National Asian Pacific Center on Aging
- National Congress of American Indians
- National Council of La Raza
- National Institute for Latino Policy
- National Urban League Policy Institute
- Organization of Chinese Americans
- Piast Institute
- Sitting Bull College
- Spelman College
- The Metropolitan Center, Florida International University
- The Navajo Nation
- The University of Texas-Pan American
- United States Hispanic Leadership Institute
- Vanderbilt University
- William C. Velasquez Institute
