= John Radzilowski =

American historian

John Radzilowski (born 1965) is an American historian, and author of numerous books and articles in the modern history of Poland and in the history of Polish-Americans. He is a professor of history at the University of Alaska Southeast.

== Career ==
In 1999, Radzilowski received his PhD from the Arizona State University. He taught courses at the University of St. Thomas, Hamline University, and Anoka-Ramsey Community College in Minnesota. Since 2007, he has been a faculty member at the University of Alaska Southeast.

Radzilowski is a fellow of the Piast Institute and is past president of the Polish American Cultural Institute of Minnesota. He later worked as the assistant coordinator of the Center for Nations in Transition at the Hubert H. Humphrey Institute of Public Affairs at the University of Minnesota.

He is a professor of history at the University of Alaska Southeast, Department of Social Science, where teaches European, U.S. and world history, geography and art history.

== Awards ==
In 1998 he received Cavaliers Cross of the Polish Order of Merit.

In 2006, he received the Oskar Halecki Prize from the Polish American Historical Association for his book Poles in Minnesota.

In 2008, he was awarded the Miecislaus Haiman Award for "sustained contribution to the study of Polish Americans" by the Polish American Historical Association.

== Books ==
- Out on the Wind. Poles and Danes in Lincoln County. (1992, 1995)
- Bells Over the Prairie. 125 Years of Holy Trinity Catholic Church. (1995)
- To Call It Home. The New Immigrants of Southwestern Minnesota. (1996 co-author with Joseph Amato)
- Prairie Town. A History of Marshall, Minnesota 1872–1997. (1997)
- Community of Strangers. Change, Turnover, Turbulence and the Transformation of a Midwestern Country Town. (1999) (co-author with Joseph Amato)
- Polish Immigrants, 1890–1920 with Rosemary Wallner. Coming to America Series. (2002)
- Poland’s Transformation. A Work in Progress. (2003) (co-author with Marek Jan Chodakiewicz i Dariusz Tołczyk)
- Spanish Carlism and Polish Nationalism. The Borderlands of Europe in the Nineteenth and Twentieth Centuries. (2003) (co-author with Marek Jan Chodakiewicz)
- The Eagle and the Cross. A History of the Polish Roman Catholic Union of America 1873–2000. (2003)
- Poles in Minnesota. (2005)
- Minnesota. On the Road History Series. (2006)
- Travellers History of Poland. (2007, 2013)
- The New Immigrants: Ukrainians Americans (Series editor: Robert D. Johnston) (2007)
- American Immigration: An Encyclopedia of Political, Social and Cultural Change. (2014) (edited with James Ciment)
- Frantic 7: The American Effort to Aid the Warsaw Uprising and the Origins of the Cold War. (2016) (co-author with Jerzy Szczęśniak)

== See also ==
- Thaddeus Radzilowski
