= Marek Jan Chodakiewicz =

Polish-American historian (born 1962)

- Born: July 15, 1962 (age 64); Warsaw, Poland

Academic background
- Education: SFSU (BA); Columbia University (MPhil, PhD)

Academic work
- Discipline: History
- Sub-discipline: World War II history
- Institutions: University of Virginia; Institute of World Politics; Patrick Henry College

Marek Jan Chodakiewicz (born July 15, 1962) is a Polish-American historian specializing in Central European history of the 19th and 20th centuries. He teaches at the Patrick Henry College and at the Institute of World Politics. He has been described as conservative and nationalistic, and his attitude towards minorities has been widely criticized.

== Early life and education ==
Chodakiewicz was born in Warsaw, Poland. He earned a Bachelor of Science degree from San Francisco State University in 1988, a M.A. from Columbia University in 1990, a M.Phil. from Columbia University in 1992, and a Ph.D. from Columbia University in 2001.

== Career ==
Between 2001 and 2003, Chodakiewicz was an assistant professor at the University of Virginia as the holder of the Kościuszko Chair in Polish Studies of the Miller Center of Public Affairs. In 2003, Chodakiewicz was appointed research professor of history and in 2004 professor of history at the Institute of World Politics in Washington, D.C., where he teaches and conducts research on East Central Europe and Russia. He is the Kościuszko Chair in Polish Studies at IWP. Chodakiewicz has also served as adjunct professor of international telations at Patrick Henry College since 2008.

In 2003, Chodakiewicz received the Józef Mackiewicz Literary Prize in Warsaw, for his two-volume book of history entitled Ejszyszki. According to Chodakiewicz, his work refutes Yaffa Eliach's allegations of a 1944 post-liberation pogrom in Eišiškės against Jews by the Polish Home Army, in which Eliach said she survived beneath the body of her mother and baby brother who were shot multiple times after being discovered hiding in a closet, and as promoted in the American media and her book. Per Chodakiewicz, Jewish bystanders were killed accidentally during an "anti-Soviet assault by the underground", and not in a pogrom. However, per Chodakiewicz "unfortunately, and quite typically, unlike the charges, the refutation received no publicity in the American media". Chodakiewicz's publication was reviewed positively in the Polish Gazeta Wyborcza newspaper, whose editor Adam Michnik had previously called Eliach's account an "insult" to Poland.

In April 2005, Chodakiewicz was appointed by President George W. Bush for a five-year term to the United States Holocaust Memorial Council. Controversy erupted towards the end of his term over Chodakiewicz's claims in several publications that Polish nationalists who murdered Jews after the Holocaust were not motivated by antisemitism. Chodakiewicz's appointment was criticized by the Southern Poverty Law Center, which said Chodakiewicz had published in far-right Polish publications. In addition, the British anti-racism organization, Hope not Hate, has said Chodakiewicz is a frequent commentator for right-wing Polish media.

Chodakiewicz is associated with the Polish National Foundation, a "quasi-public organization funded by state-owned corporations to promote Poland's reputation abroad." Within a period of two years, Chodakiewicz and his family received more than $250,000 from the foundation's funds.

== Reviews ==
=== After the Holocaust: Polish-Jewish Conflict in the Wake of World War II (2003) ===
Reviewing After the Holocaust: Polish-Jewish Conflict in the Wake of World War II (2003), Antony Polonsky wrote: "like the author's earlier book, Żydzi i Polacy 1918-1955... this volume is intended to correct 'anti-Polish stereotypes' (p. 347), and it does not rise above the clichés of old-fashioned nationalist apologetics." He criticizes Chodakiewicz for his simplistic view of the situation in post-war Poland, for ignoring the widespread antisemitism at the time and for equating Polish and Jewish "groups", despite the latter being utterly decimated during the Holocaust. He ends his article observing that "what is most striking about this book is the lack of empathy with those caught up in these tragic events."

Klaus-Peter Friedrich, reviewing After the Holocaust: Polish-Jewish Conflict in the Wake of World War II, criticizes Chodakiewicz's work as "selective and impressionistic", and "marred by many contradictions". Friedrich says that Chodakiewicz's manner of referring to fully assimilated Jews is similar to that used in radical right-wing media; he concludes that the book seems to be written with an aim rooted in the politics of commemoration. Friedrich also reviewed Chodakiewicz's Between Nazis and Soviets: Occupation Politics in Poland, 1939–1947, a study of the Nazi and Soviet occupation in Janów County in southeast Poland. He observes that as previous studies focused on large cities, Chodakiewicz's contribution is significant in terms of what is known of rural Poland. However, Friedrich criticizes Chodakiewicz's omission of prior research, in particular recent literature on collaboration.

=== The Massacre in Jedwabne, July 10, 1941: Before, During, and After (2005) ===
Reviewing The Massacre in Jedwabne, July 10, 1941: Before, During, and After (2005) on the Jedwabne pogrom, Peter Stachura in a very positive review described the book as meticulous and well researched. In contrast, Joanna Michlic in her review writes that the book presents "intellectually and morally unacceptable interpretations", being part of a "ethno-nationalist historiography" trend that promotes "an image of Poland as only heroic, suffering, noble, and innocent". Piotr Wróbel in his review, says that Chodakiewicz's aim, as stated in the introduction, is to show Jan T. Gross is wrong. Wróbel acknowledges that Chodakiewicz makes some good arguments, however they are "overshadowed by numerous flaws" and the book lacks any sense of proportion. According to Wróbel, the book has a "visible political agenda" and is "difficult to read, unoriginal, irritating, and unconvincing".

=== Golden Harvest or Hearts of Gold? (2012) ===
Golden Harvest or Hearts of Gold?, a 2012 collection of essays co-edited by Chodakiewicz, and a polemic with Gross' book Golden Harvest, was heavily criticized by Danusha Goska for anything from not using a spellchecker to "cherry picking" historical anecdotes, as well as for repeatedly attacking scholars on the other side of the debate. David Engel said that the book "reaffirms the conventional Polish wisdom and impugns the academic integrity of prominent scholars (not only Gross) who have questioned it."

=== Intermarium: The Land between the Black and Baltic Seas (2012) ===
Reviewing Intermarium: The Land between the Black and Baltic Seas (2012) for the Sarmatian Review, Karl A. Roider Jr. describes the main theme of the book as a struggle between the democratic Polish model and the Russian totalitarian model over the Intermarium which per Chodakiewicz's includes the Baltic States, Ukraine, Belarus, and Moldova. Roider's review is relatively negative. The review by Dovid Katz was also critical of the book, commenting the book's final chapter as a "hatchet job against Jewish partisans... [that] resorts to a number of abuses of academic structure to mask the genre of nationalist polemic."

Peter Stachura published his more positive review of the book in The Slavonic and East European Review. He calls the book "impressively ambitious, panoramic examination of a substantial part of Central and Eastern Europe". Silviu Miloiu's review of the book in Journal of Baltic Studies was also favorable; in his conclusion Miliou stated: "On the whole, the book is one of the most competent and well-written accounts of the Intermarium that I have read. It is based on an impressive range of sources. It sheds new light on historical and present-day processes".

Alexander Prusin reviewing the book for the Slavic Review said the work seems to be rather derivative of and of lesser significance and quality to similar works published recently by scholars such as Timothy Snyder, Kate Brown or Piotr Wandycz although "it will certainly find propitious ground among those who favor a new cordon sanitaire in Europe".

Donald E. Pienkos in his review published in The Polish Review in 2018, commented that the parts of the books focused on history of Eastern Europe make for a "worthy, if not flawless, publication", but is more critical of its polemical part in which "the author castigates western scholars for their alleged ignorance of the region and their Russofilia", concluding that the polemical part significantly lowers the overall quality of the book.

== Critical assessment ==
Chodakiewicz wrote several books in response to works by Jan T. Gross about The Holocaust in Poland. His approach to the Holocaust was criticized by Joanna Michlic as an attempt to erase the "dark past" by showing only a "good past". Other critics have criticized Chodakiewicz for his reluctance to accept Polish responsibility for the Kielce pogrom. Critics take particular issue with Chodakiewicz's argument that Jewish-born communist partisans' and functionaries' killing of Poles during the Soviet occupation "contextualizes", if not justifies, Polish violence against Jews. Laurence Weinbaum compares Chodakiewicz's writing to pseudo-scholarly screeds and says that Chodakiewicz believes that scholars of antisemitism in Poland are advancing an "anti-Western" and "anti-American" agenda.

Joanna Michlic characterizes Chodakiewicz as one of "the main representatives of the post-1989 historiography characterized by prejudicial views towards Jews and other minorities ... These historians belong to the school of (ethno)nationalist history writing in which the themes of martyrdom and victimhood of ethnic Poles vis-a-vis other groups play a key role in shaping their arguments and interpretation", with Chodakiewicz being the most extreme of the lot.

Jan T. Gross was quoted as saying that "[Chodakiewicz] is an ideologist of the radical right, I don't have any doubts that he's anti-Semitic." While Polish-Canadian historian Piotr Wróbel said that "he would never use a phrase or adjective that would clearly identify him as an anti-Semite", but "There is no doubt whatsoever that he doesn't like the Jews.". Chodakiewicz rejected the allegations as "baseless", and his term on the council ended in 2010.

Andrzej Żbikowski writes that Chodakiewicz, along with Jan Żaryn, leads the "nationalist/national democratic camp" of Polish historians, affiliated with Fronda and Glaukopis, "a publication that has arisen mainly to rehabilitate unconditionally the wartime activities of the [nationalist] Narodowe Siły Zbrojne (NSZ)." Chodakiewicz's writing, according to Żbikowski, is characterized by selective usage of examples, justification of Poles' negative attitudes towards Jews during the war, and a lack of empathy with Jewish victims.

In his critical review of Intermarium in the Israel Journal of Foreign Affairs, Dovid Katz writes that Chodakiewicz "is a forceful advocate of a Republican Party-type platform, with ample specific references to the Reagan years ... [he] is socially conservative—that is to say pro-religion, anti-secularist, anti-gay, anti-left, and anti-liberal. [In his writings] there is an implicit call for the disenfranchisement of the Russian-speaking minorities in [Eastern Europe and the Baltic states]. ... [He] is also somewhat fixated with the purported dangers of 'homosexual frolic' and 'so-called "gay pride" parades' (both p. 253), 'gay liberation' (p. 378), 'radical lifestyles' (p. 421), 'gender, queer and other guises' (p. 468), 'sexual politics (including feminism and gay rights)' (p. 528) ... Turning to Jewish issues, it is no secret that Chodakiewicz comes to the table with a controversial record that has included disguising Polish nationalism and anti-Jewish sentiment on Poland-related issues as objective historical research. Notorious episodes include his vitriolic attacks on Jan T. Gross's pioneering scholarship and the omniscient search for Jews among the evil Communists." Katz writes that Chodakiewicz "winds up praising the Ukrainian Nazi groups that actually helped perpetrate the Holocaust". He contrasts Chodakiewicz's work with that of Western scholars like Timothy Snyder (Bloodlands, 2012) and Alexander Prusin (The Lands Between: Conflict in the East European Borderlands, 1870–1992, 2010)."

Chodakiewicz has been accused of promulgating antisemitic or insensitive tropes about Jewish people, and his works were involved in a controversy involving the possible skewed coverage of the Holocaust on Wikipedia.

== Political and sexuality-related views ==
In July 2008, Chodakiewicz wrote that Barack Obama was once a Muslim, a radical, and associate of communists. In 2014, Chodakiewicz spoke at a rally of the Ruch Narodowy party, saying: "We want a Catholic Poland, not a Bolshevik one, not multicultural or gay!".

In July 2017, Chodakiewicz helped draft US President Donald Trump's speech delivered at Warsaw Uprising Monument, and traveled with the Presidential delegation.

In 2019, Chodakiewicz released the book About the Civilization of Death: How to stop the anti-culture of totalitarian minorities, stating: "I saw with my own eyes how LGBT, gender, and feminism emerged from the underground and was gradually embraced in American politics: introducing a new version of Marxism that I call Marxism-Lesbianism." In July 2019, during a book tour in Poland, Chodakiewicz gave a talk at the Institute of National Remembrance's Janusz Kurtyka IPN Educational Center in Warsaw. During the talk, which was moderated by Najwyższy Czas! editor Tomasz Sommer, Chodakiewicz made severely homophobic remarks. For example, he described the urban legend of "gerbilling" as factual.

== Awards ==
- 2003 Józef Mackiewicz Literary Award
- Order of Polonia Restituta (2007)

== Books ==
- 1996 [1995]: Ciemnogród? O Prawicy i Lewicy [Hicksville? On the Right and Left] Ronin Publishers, ISBN 83-86445-00-9 (in Polish).
- 1997: Zagrabiona pamięć: Wojna w Hiszpanii, 1936–39 [Expropriated Memory: War in Spain], wyd. Fronda, ISBN 83-907210-2-4 (in Polish).
- 1997–1999: Co-editor: Tajne Oblicze: Dokumenty GL-AL i PPR, 1942-1945 [Secret Face: Documents of the Communist underground], 3 vols. Burchard Edition, ISBN 83-87654-03-5 (in Polish).
- 1994, 1999: Narodowe Siły Zbrojne: „Ząb" przeciw dwu wrogom [National Armed Forces: „Ząb" against two enemies], wyd. WAMA, 2nd. ed. Fronda, ISBN 83-911097-1-2 (in Polish).
- 2000: Żydzi i Polacy 1918–1955: Współistnienie, Zagłada, Komunizm [Jews and Poles 1918–1955: Coexistence, Holocaust, Communism], wyd. Fronda, ISBN 83-912541-8-6 (in Polish).
- 2002: Editor: Ejszyszki. Kulisy zajść w Ejszyszkach: Epilog stosunków polsko-żydowskich na Kresach, 1944–45: Wspomnienia-dokumenty-publicystyka [Ejszyszki: The Background to events in Ejszyszki: The Epilogue of Polish-Jewish relations in the Borderlands], wyd. Fronda, ISBN 83-911063-3-0 (in Polish).
- 2003: Co-editor: Spanish Carlism and Polish Nationalism: The Borderlands of Europe in the 19th and 20th Centuries, Leopolis Press, ISBN 0-9679960-5-8.
- 2003: After the Holocaust: Polish-Jewish Relations in the Wake of World War II, East European Monographs, ISBN 0-88033-511-4.
- 2003: Co-editor: Poland's Transformation: A Work in Progress, Leopolis Press, ISBN 0-9679960-2-3
- 2004: Co-editor: Ronald Reagan: Moja wizja Ameryki [My vision of America], Wydawnictwo Arwil, ISBN 83-919221-5-4 (in Polish).
- 2004: Between Nazis and Soviets: Occupation Politics in Poland, 1939–1947, Lexington Books, ISBN 0-7391-0484-5.
- 2005: The Massacre in Jedwabne, July 10, 1941: Before, During, After, Columbia University Press and East European Monographs, ISBN 0-88033-554-8.
- 2010: Co-editor, with Wojciech Jerzy Muszyński, Żeby Polska była polska: Antologia publicystyki konspiracyjnej podziemia narodowego 1939–1950 [So That Poland Remains Polish: An Anthology of the Polish Nationalist Underground Press] (Warsaw: IPN, 2010), ISBN 9788376292120.
- 2011: Co-editor, with Wojciech Jerzy Muszyński, Złote serca czy złote żniwa. Studia nad wojennymi losami Polaków i Żydów [Hearts of Gold or a Golden Harvest? Studies on the Wartime Fate of Poles and Jews] (Warsaw: The Facto, 2011), ISBN 978-8361808053.
- 2012: Co-editor, with Wojciech Jerzy Muszynski and Pawel Styrna, Golden Harvest or Hearts of Gold? Studies on the Fate of Wartime Poles and Jews (Washington, DC: Leopolis Press), ISBN 0-9824888-1-5.
- 2012: Intermarium: The Land between the Black and Baltic Seas (New Brunswick, NJ: Transaction Publishers), ISBN 978-1412847742.
- 2019: About the Civilization of Death: How to stop the anti-culture of totalitarian minorities (Warsaw, 3S Media), ISBN 978-83-619-3599-5.

== See also ==
- List of Poles
