= Radzilowski =

Radzilowski can refer to:

- John Radzilowski
- Thaddeus Radzilowski
