= Polish-American vote =

Overview of the Polish-American voting bloc

Polish-Americans in the United States comprise a voter group sought after by both the Democratic and Republican parties as they have a bellwether status. Polish Americans comprise 3.2% of the United States population. The Polish-American population is concentrated in several Midwestern swing states that make issues important to Polish-Americans more likely to be heard by presidential candidates. According to John Kromkowski, a Catholic University professor of political science, Polish-Americans make up an "almost archetypical swing vote". The Piast Institute found that Polish Americans are 36% Democrats, 33% Independents, and 26% are Republicans as of 2008. Ideologically, they were categorized as being in the more conservative wing of the Democratic Party, and demonstrated a much stronger inclination for third-party candidates in presidential elections than the American public.

== Voting ==
Historically, Polish-American voters have swung from the Democratic and Republican parties depending on economic and social politics. In the 1916 election, Woodrow Wilson courted Poles through his promises of Polish autonomy. Upon his death and the failures of the proposed League of Nations, Polish-Americans shifted Republican, voting for Warren Harding, Calvin Coolidge, and Herbert Hoover because of their frustration with Wilson and the weakness of the nascent Polish state. The Democratic Party won over Polonia during the New Deal Coalition forged by President Franklin D. Roosevelt, and gained strong support for the war effort by Polish-Americans who were fiercely against Nazi Germany. FDR consistently won over 90% of the Polish vote during his four terms. Polish-Americans founded the Polish American Congress (PAC) in 1944 to create strong leadership and represent Polish interests during World War II. FDR met with the PAC and assured Poles of a peaceful and independent Poland following the war. When this did not come to fruition, and with the publication of Arthur Bliss Lane's I Saw Poland Betrayed in 1947, Polish-Americans came to feel that they had been betrayed by the United States government. John F. Kennedy won a majority of the Polish vote in 1960, owing in part to his Catholicism and connection to ethnic communities and the labor movement. Since then, Polish voters have been tied to the more conservative wing of the Democratic Party, but shifted away from the Democrats over social issues such as abortion. Poland's liberation from Soviet occupation during the 1980s was championed to Ronald Reagan and George H. W. Bush, but Bill Clinton seized Polish voters through his expansion of NATO.

In modern politics, the Polish-American vote continues to have influence in the United States. Polish Americans comprise 3.2% of the United States population, but were estimated at nearly 10% of the overall electorate as of 2012. The Polish-American population is concentrated in several Midwestern swing states that make issues important to Polish-Americans more likely to be heard by presidential candidates.

== History ==
Polish-Americans entered the United States in relatively large numbers before 1914, and during this time many were mostly apolitical. Only during the 1920s as a result of Woodrow Wilson's policies did America's Polonia turn to the Democratic Party with strong allegiance; the allegiance to the Democratic Party was strengthened by the candidacy of Al Smith, a Catholic politician, and FDR's labor reforms.

=== American colonies ===
The first Americans of Polish extraction originated in 1608, when Captain John Smith brought a handful to Virginia for their expertise in glass production, pitch, tar, soap making, and ship construction. After they went on strike demanding the right to vote they were allowed to vote.

=== Polish-Americans and World War I ===
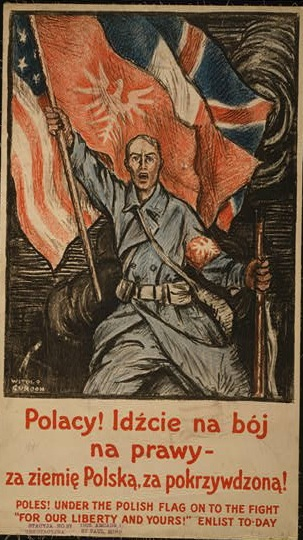
WWI poster urging Polish-Americans to join the armies of the U.S., Britain, and France on behalf of Poland's liberty (posted St. Paul, MN, 1917)

Polish-Americans were highly mobilized by the prospect of defeating Germany during World War I and achieving independence. During 1914 to 1918, Polish immigration to the United States came to a halt, and many Polish-Americans joined the United States army to fight for their homeland. Polish diplomat Ignacy Paderewski came to the United States in 1913 to motivate Polish-Americans to fight in the U.S. Army. The recruitment effort generated at least 28,000 volunteers from the United States. Many of the volunteers were organized by the Polish Falcons, a fraternal Polish-American group within the United States since 1887. The American Poles were sent to Niagara on the Lake and Fort Niagara for military training before being sent to France for battle. They fought in a separate regiment under the leadership of General Józef Haller, and were also known as Haller's Army. Of the Polish-American war effort, Newton D. Baker, the U.S. Secretary of War, said "their presence on the Western front represents both their adherence to America as the country of their adoption, and to Poland, free and self-governing, as the country of their inspiring sight." The Army saw its first action in June 1918 near Reims and their transportation to France and back to the United States was funded by the French government. The majority of Poles moved back to the United States, but a small constituency remained in Europe.

As a result of Poland's independence following World War I, American Poles became more conscious of their heritage and developed stronger connection to their nation. Previously, Poland had been under domination by Germany, Prussia, Austria-Hungary and Russia, without its independence since 1792. Polish-Americans grew highly patriotic towards the United States during World War I, and turned to Woodrow Wilson with a strong 74% of the vote in 1916 for his support of Polish independence. A similar ethnic experience occurred for other Slavic immigrants in the United States during World War I, particularly Czech and Slovak, when the Pittsburgh Agreement was drafted with backing from the Allies.

=== World War I and Polish autonomy (1916–1928) ===
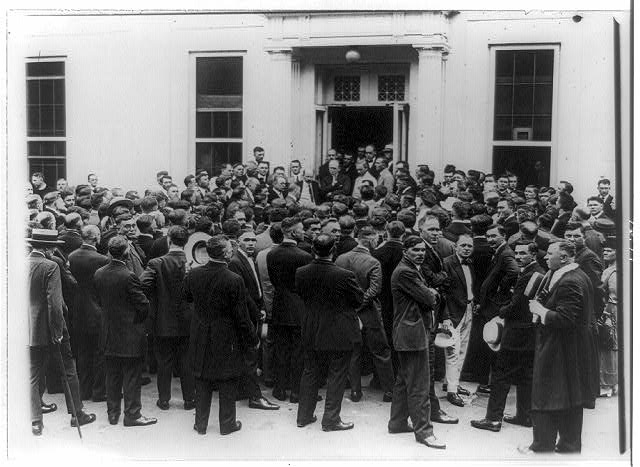
Joseph P. Tumulty addressing a Polish-American demonstration to the Wilson administration urging for Polish support in maintaining autonomy

During and after World War I, Americans of Polish descent were concerned about the future autonomy of Poland. In the years after World War I, Poland was a very weak and fragmented state surrounded by strong superpowers. Woodrow Wilson supported the Poles and helped them achieve a fully independent state that won—for the first time in centuries—in ongoing territorial disputes with Germany. Wilson listed Poland in his "Fourteen Points" speech and had Germany cede territorial control to Poland in Upper Silesia and Danzig. After World War I, Poland was an independent state with access to the Baltic Sea. Wilson's friendly policy toward Poland was due in large part to his close personal friendship with Ignacy Jan Paderewski, who spoke frequently to Polish-American social clubs. For his support, Wilson was awarded the Order of the White Eagle by the Polish government and his death was declared a day of national mourning. However, Polish-Americans grew concerned by Germany's strength and future military capability, and demonstrators met with President Woodrow Wilson's secretary, Joseph P. Tumulty (at right) urging the Wilson administration to help Poland maintain peace against a strengthening Germany. Tumulty reported on multiple demonstrations against Germany's militaristic aggression against Poland, as well as other eastern European nations.^{a} In telegrams, Tumulty also indicated unpopularity of terms of the Treaty and the League, and said the Republican Party could take disaffected voters, such as the Poles, by opposing the League of Nations.^{b}

After Woodrow Wilson, Polish voters swung Republican starting in 1920, like many ethnics who supported Warren Harding. Poles were upset with the borders set up by the Treaty of Versailles, as were the Germans, Italian, Czech, and Irish ethnics in the United States. Poles were also frustrated by the Little Treaty of Versailles, which was signed at the same time as the official Treaty of Versailles. The "little treaty" placed on Poland's independence a contingent minority clause, stated as: "Poland accepts ... provisions ... to protect the interests of inhabitants of Poland who differ from the majority of the population in race, language, or religion". The new Polish nation, which contained many Russians, Ukrainians, Jews, and Germans, was made especially weak by the clause granting these groups a protected class distinction in Poland. Ethnic strife with the Ukrainians and Russians were made very tense as the result of ongoing wars, including the Polish–Ukrainian War and the Polish–Soviet War. The Treaty provided minority safeguards to Jewish Poles, and Wilson sent Henry Morgenthau, Sr. and other Jewish-American diplomats to Poland to defend Jews against any anti-semitism. These 1919 investigations were called "humiliating invasions upon the internal affairs of Poland through the granting of privileges for the Jews" by the Polish National Alliance. Poles felt that the new nation was held to a double standard, as their national minorities were protected by the League of Nations, whereas Polish minorities in Germany or Russia did not experience corresponding protections, despite continuous ethnic strife. Dziennik Zwiazkowy, a Polish-American newspaper, endorsed Harding, who campaigned as being against the League of Nations, as "the next in a line of great and wise [Republican] presidents." The postwar economy suffered from double digit unemployment and 15% inflation, and a rise in violence and labor protests served as a rebuke of the Democratic Party. Harding's argument that this poor economic situation was the "new normalcy" under Democratic administrations attracted many urban voters, including Chicago Poles.

=== Relief effort and Herbert Hoover (1928) ===
Polish-Americans generally were predisposed to Democratic candidates because of their economic status in the United States, but they gave their overwhelming appreciation to Republican President Herbert Hoover in 1928 unlike any other ethnic community. Hoover had served in the American Relief Association during the Wilson administration, and his support in aiding starving Polish children following World War I was not forgotten. The Republican National Committee produced pamphlets and made his humanitarian efforts a part of Herbert's presidential campaign. Polish-American support for him was very high in his election–65%. Polish support for Hoover was entirely different from other ethnic Americans; Smith won 82% of the Irish, 77% of the Italian, and 73% of the German vote. Smith was a Catholic from an immigrant family of New York, and fought against prohibition, making him a candidate Poles identified with on many levels. Prohibition was seen as a form of nativist intolerance towards immigrants such as the Poles, and Smith's stance won him over 80% of the vote in Polish neighborhoods of Chicago.

In Buffalo, New York in 1936, Polish-Americans formed the "Ecpole" party, a portmanteau of "Erie County" and "Pole," after failing to earn "major patronage" from the mainstream New York State Democratic Party. They ran candidates unsuccessfully in several local and Congressional elections.

=== World War II and the Polish-American Congress ===
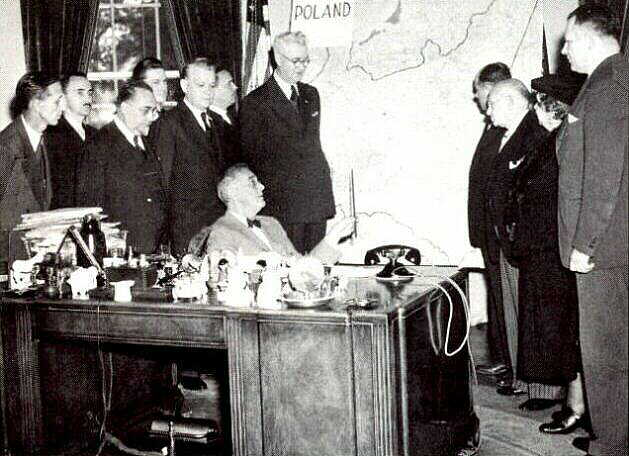
FDR with the Polish-American Congress, discussing the future Polish state, 1944

President Franklin D. Roosevelt took measures to defeat his Republican opponent in 1940, Wendell Willkie, by means of the Polish-American vote. FDR asked the FBI to do an investigation on Willkie to find out his ancestry. J. Edgar Hoover was entrusted by Roosevelt to lead the investigation, but refused to do so. An investigation would have been launched with the intention of finding out if Willkie's rumored Polish ancestry were true, as a change in surname from a Polish one to Willkie would have created a fallout of support from Polish-American voters.

In 1944, Franklin D. Roosevelt assured Polish-American leaders that he would work for a strong and independent Poland, meeting with the Polish-American Congress and gaining key endorsements. FDR posed with Polish-American leaders in front of a large map of prewar Poland, creating imagery of an expanded Poland free from encroaching Soviet occupation. He made a pledge to uphold the Atlantic Charter relating to Poland in Chicago one week before the presidential elections. FDR won over 90% of the Polish-American vote, but gave in to Stalin's demands after World War II. In private conversations, FDR told Stalin that he was willing to give the USSR Poland's eastern region while taking land it lost to Germany, moving it westward. However, he indicated that he needed Polish votes to win his re-election and would not want to have his intentions with Stalin known because they were clear violations of his campaign promises. FDR kept his promises to Stalin so secretive that even his successor, Harry Truman, was never informed of them. In Truman's first days in office, he called in the Russian foreign minister and dealt with him harshly, saying that Russia's new communist-imposed rule on Poland was a violation of its obligations and authorities under World War II agreements, and that it had exceeded its welcome after entering Poland to fight Nazi Germany. Truman later learned the extent of FDR's cooperation with Stalin and gave in, recognizing the Soviet-occupied regime as the legitimate Polish government. During the Truman administration, U.S. Ambassador to Poland Arthur Bliss Lane resigned in protest after witnessing fixed elections in Poland. He spoke at a rally in May 1947, gathering 50,000 Polish-Americans who heard him denounce the U.S. appeasement policy towards the U.S.S.R.

Truman sought re-election in 1948, and the Democratic National Committee had experienced some fallout among Polish-American voters. According to tapped phone conversations to Thomas Gardiner Corcoran days after the 1946 midterm elections in Chicago, an adviser found disappointing results for Democrats in Chicago and concluded to him that "The Poles are very selfish people. They thought that Roosevelt let them down at Yalta." The DNC contacted city officials in Chicago to determine the extent of Republican inroads into the urban neighborhoods. Truman also met with Thaddeus Wasielewski, a Polish-American politician who lost re-election due to a bitter internal party dispute over the Yalta conference.

Following World War II, Polish-Americans failed to mobilize or organize a "Polish caucus" with specific interests and political decisions as to what would be in the best interests for them. The Polish National Alliance was furious with Truman and the Democratic Party, and its president endorsed Dewey in the 1948 election. In 1952, following the results of the Yalta Conference and the takeover of Poland by the Soviet Union, Poles overwhelmingly voted against the Democratic Party, giving 70% of their support to Dwight D. Eisenhower. However, the majority of Polish-Americans kept a strict allegiance to labor politics and the Democratic Party.

=== JFK and return to the Democratic Party ===
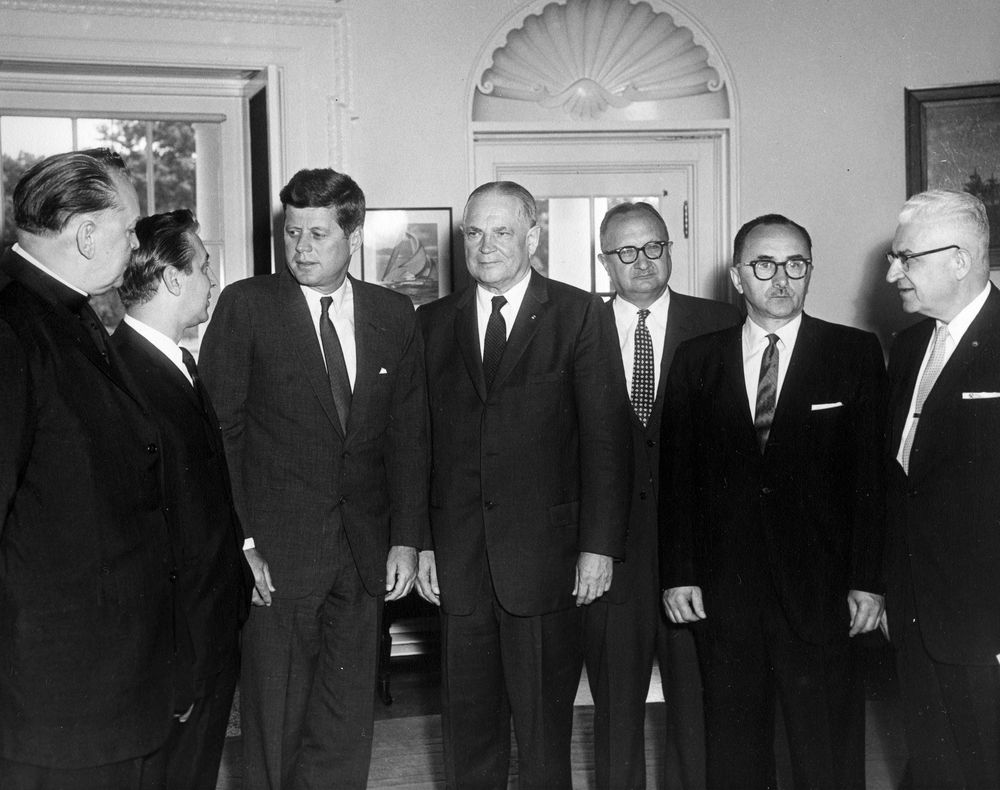
JFK meeting with a delegation of the Polish-American Congress, 1961

In 1960, Polish-Americans voted overwhelmingly for John F. Kennedy, the first Catholic U.S. president, and remained strong Democratic Party supporters. Kennedy's Catholicism, ethnic roots, and anti-Communist stance made him very popular among Polish-Americans, who gave him 78% of their votes. As early as 1955, Kennedy received a citation from the Polish-American Citizens Club in Boston for his attention to Polish issues, including his recent trip to Poland, his reports on the conditions afflicting the country, and his commitment to anti-Communism in the region. On March 2, 1958, Kennedy was awarded the "Man of the Year" award by the Polish Daily News. In his acceptance speech, he placed great focus on the nation in the Soviet sphere, saying:

Therefore, this country's relations with Poland–like a wind, good or ill, that blows through the only window in a vast and crowded prison–will vitally affect the future, the hope or despair of every satellite country. American policy must take risks and must make sacrifices to dramatize and demonstrate our sympathy for and commitment to the Polish people. If we do so, we can obtain an invaluable reservoir of good will among the Polish people, strengthen their will to resist and drive still a further wedge between the Polish government and the Kremlin. For the satellite nations of Eastern Europe represent the one area of the world where the Soviet Union is on the defensive today, the tender spot within its coat of iron armor, the potential source of an inflammation that could spread infectious independence throughout its system, accomplishing from within what the West could never accomplish from without.

=== 1960s and Richard Nixon ===
Polish-Americans trended, as did many white middle class ethnics, away from the Democratic Party beginning in the 1960s. The culture wars that had erupted over the civil rights movement, Vietnam protests, drugs, feminism and abortion were decidedly against Polish-American Catholics' socially conservative views. The Polish-American voters of the 1968 election trended more Republican than those of the JFK and LBJ elections. However, in 1968 Poles gained their closest chance at winning higher office when Edmund Muskie ran for vice-president alongside Hubert Humphrey. The Republicans further alienated the Polish-American vote in 1968 with Spiro Agnew, who used the slur "Polacks" during the campaign.^{c} Poles voted for Humphrey over Nixon by a narrow margin, 56–44%. Nixon won over states with significant Polish minorities—Michigan, Illinois, Ohio, and Wisconsin—for 90 electoral votes of his 301 total. Ieva Zake speculated that this was a success for Nixon, as the Polish-American vote had been over 80% Democratic in 1964.

During his election in 1972, Richard Nixon is credited with remaking the Republican Party into a "new majority", which focused on inclusion of blue-collar workers, southern and suburban whites, and urban ethnic Catholics, especially of Italian, Irish, and Polish descent. Nixon's supporters painted a label on his opponent as supporting "amnesty, acid, and abortion", which was factually not accurate, but stuck in people's memory. McGovern's standing with Polish-Americans was hurt by the fact that he had beaten Edmund Muskie in the Democratic primary, effectively killing their chance of a U.S. president of Polish descent. Had Muskie been successful in 1972, it is believed that Polish-Americans would have remained in the Democratic Party, but because McGovern won, the growing association of anti-war activism, Black Panther radicals, flag-burning, fringe civil rights groups with the Democratic Party turned off many Poles. McGovern supported the peace protests against Vietnam at the time, and his Democratic Party was increasingly influenced by women, minorities, and leaders of the peace movement, at the expense of traditional labor leaders such as George Meany of the AFL–CIO. Nixon won in 1972 with 61% of the popular vote and 520 electoral votes to McGovern's 17. Polish-Americans voted for Nixon, 53–47%.^{d}

Richard Nixon's forced resignation included the protracted investigations brought on by a Polish-American Special Prosecutor Leon Jaworski, who demanded Nixon's incriminating tapes. Many Polish-Americans were traditional values voters, and felt wronged by Richard Nixon during the scandal. Poles, as well as other White ethnic voters, voted Democrat in 1976 despite trends towards the Republican Party made in previous elections. Gerald Ford lost support for pardoning his predecessor, further associating him with the guilt of the Nixon administration.

=== Gerald Ford ===
External videos
- Ford-Carter Debate Excerpt, YouTube, Oct 6, 1976
- Presidential Candidates Debates, Oct 6, 1976, C-SPAN Video Library, full-length video

During the 1976 election, Ford made a gaffe^{h} that is considered a textbook example^{e} of how ethnicity could affect voting behavior.^{f} In one debate, Ford stated, "there is no Soviet domination in Eastern Europe" and said he didn't believe Poles felt controlled by Soviet occupation. Poland, as well as Czechoslovakia, Hungary, Romania, Bulgaria, and Yugoslavia had been listed as "captive nations" and recognized as such under United States Cold War politics from its inception in 1959. Time magazine on Oct 18, 1976 said Ford "was given a chance to retreat" from his statement upon cross-examination, but chose to continue and "charged into a trap of his own making", saying that Poland, Romania, and Yugoslavia had been "independent, autonomous" countries. His statement was widely challenged and Ford's reluctance to correct it for over a week after the debate hurt him in national polls.^{i} The shift in popularity for Ford was not solely due to a shift in the Polish-American vote by any means, but it was an enormous shock to Polish-Americans. According to Terry Gabinski, a Democratic politician in Chicago, Polish-Americans were not eager to vote for Jimmy Carter up to that point because they believed he was pro-abortion and did not want to disobey the Catholic Church's teachings on abortion. However, after the debate, they were in shock and called on Ford to immediately make an apology. Many American Poles had outright changed their votes that day. The mayor of Buffalo, Stanley Makowski, stated of the Polish community, "many were undecided. Sometimes it takes one thing that pushes them over the brink. This looks like it."

=== Reagan and Bush ===
Ronald Reagan and George H. W. Bush were staunch supporters of Poland's independence during the Cold War, and kept the Polish-American vote on the Republican side.

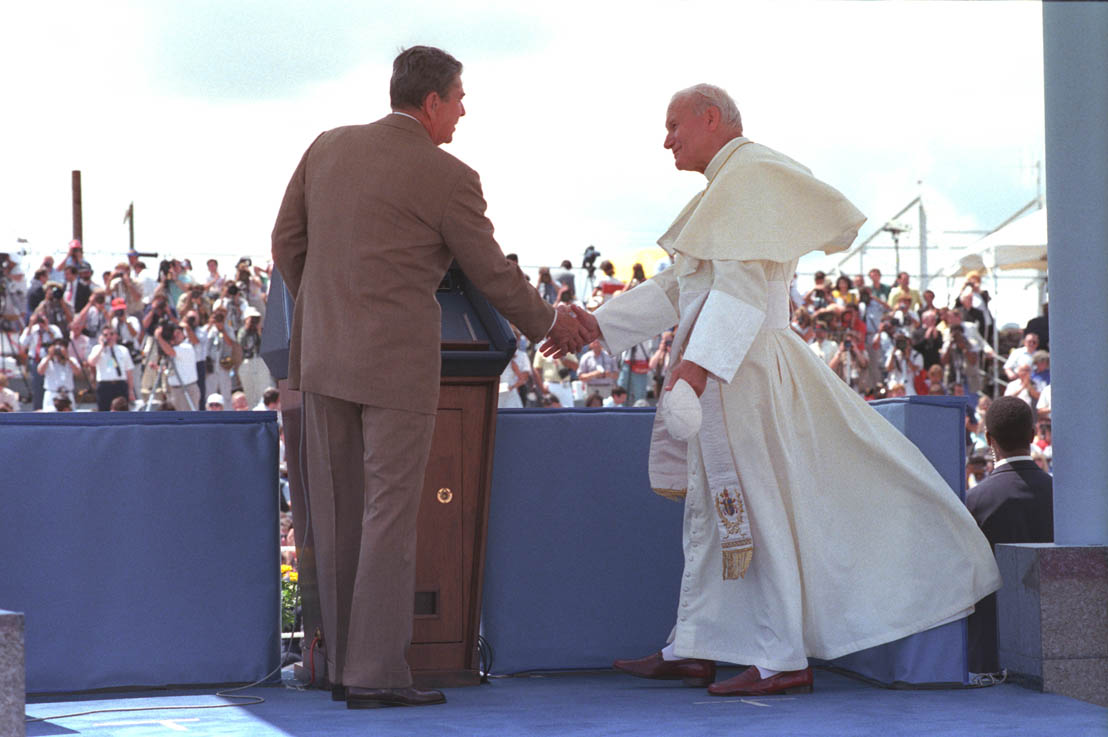
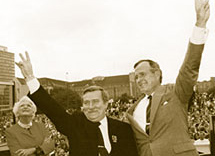
Ronald Reagan and Bush's stance on liberating Soviet-occupied Poland was a major bridge to the Polish-American community

=== Bill Clinton and NATO enlargement ===
Bill Clinton won Polish-American support for helping Poland enter NATO in 1996. The expansion of NATO to include Poland was highly popular in Poland itself, but there was debate as to how important the issue was to Polish-Americans. When reasoning whether to make this a political issue and campaign on it during his presidential run, Clinton asked for political research on the domestic impact of expanding NATO. Dick Morris, his political advisor, was entrusted with polling to study Polish-Americans' views on the issue. Morris stated, "Neither I nor the president ever believed there is such a thing as a Polish vote. There is a white vote, a black vote, a Jewish vote, and a Hispanic vote." Senator Joe Biden of Delaware initially felt similarly, and said his constituents did not care about NATO enlargement.

The Polish ambassador to the United States, Jerzy Koźminski, took effort to find Senators and congressional leaders with sizable Polish constituencies so he could influence them. Two congressmen with the largest constituencies, Benjamin Gilman and Hank Brown, held meetings with Koźminski personally and immediately signed for Poland's enrollment into NATO. Robert Torricelli leaned against enlargement, until busloads of Polish-Americans demonstrated at his office and changed his mind. In March 1997, Polish American activist Marilyn Piurek met with President Clinton and discussed his support for Poland, Hungary and the Czech Republic's entry into NATO. This led to further talks on this issue. By 1997, during the U.S. Senate hearings on NATO expansion, Joe Biden, the Chairman of Foreign Policy, was an enthusiastic supporter of NATO's enlargement to Poland, Czech Republic, and Hungary.

=== Bush presidency (2000–2008) ===
Al Gore did not win over the Polish-American vote with much effort, and the National Democratic Ethnic Coordinating Council identified that as a blunder to his campaign. Specifically, Gore was criticized for not holding any events for the Polish-American community in Florida, where there were roughly 500,000 voters of Polish descent. On Nov. 1, 2000, just days before the election, Gore turned down an invitation to come to Washington for the Polish National Alliance's celebration of 20 years of Solidarity, including the AFL-CIO President. The event was non-partisan, and both Bush and Gore were invited. Gore did not come and did not express any regrets, which was perceived as a snub.

=== Obama ===
Polish-U.S. relations remain highly stable, although President Obama suffered criticism and declining popularity from Poles on several issues during his first term:

- Visa Waiver Program – During his visit to Poland in 2011, Pres. Obama said of the program, "I am going to make this a priority. And I want to solve this issue before very long. My expectation is that this problem will be solved during my presidency." Some Poles have been deeply disappointed by the Obama administration's inaction on the issue, and believe this was an empty promise.
- US missile defense complex in Poland – the Obama administration's decision to cancel a proposed defense complex in Poland received an underwhelming response, and was categorized as "appeasement" to the Russian Federation.. To add insult to injury the date selected for cancellation (17 September) is anniversary of 1939 Soviet invasion.
- Lech Kaczyński funeral – in 2010, President Obama could not attend President Kaczynski's funeral, because volcanic ash from Iceland forced Poland to shut down all airports. However, following the Smolensk crash President Obama did call Prime Minister Tusk to express his condolences to the people of Poland and made an official statement expressing his support of Poland.

=== Trump ===
External videos
- Donald Trump speaks to Polish American Congress during his campaign

William Ciosek, a Polish American activist assisted in arranging a televised meeting with Donald Trump with the Polish American Congress during the 2016 presidential campaign. Ciosek stated that Trump "wouldn't win" without Polish American votes, and cited the popularity of the Republican nominee among Polish Americans in Chicago as well as neighboring Ohio and Wisconsin, both bellwether states that Trump won narrowly in the 2016 United States presidential election. Two campaign promises Trump made to American Polonia during his visit to Chicago were extending the Visa Waiver Program to Poland and supporting the return of the Smoleńsk plane crash remains to Poland.

== Contemporary politics ==
The Piast Institute's political report found that Polish-Americans' interests are rooted in Polish-U.S. economic and political cooperation, and many Poles continue to view Russia as an adversary to Polish and American interests. Marilyn Piurek, who founded Polish Americans for Clinton-Gore and organized the National Leadership Committee of Polish Americans for Obama, said that her community is well-aligned with domestic policy, and has no differences from other American voters, but will unite on important Polish foreign policy interests.

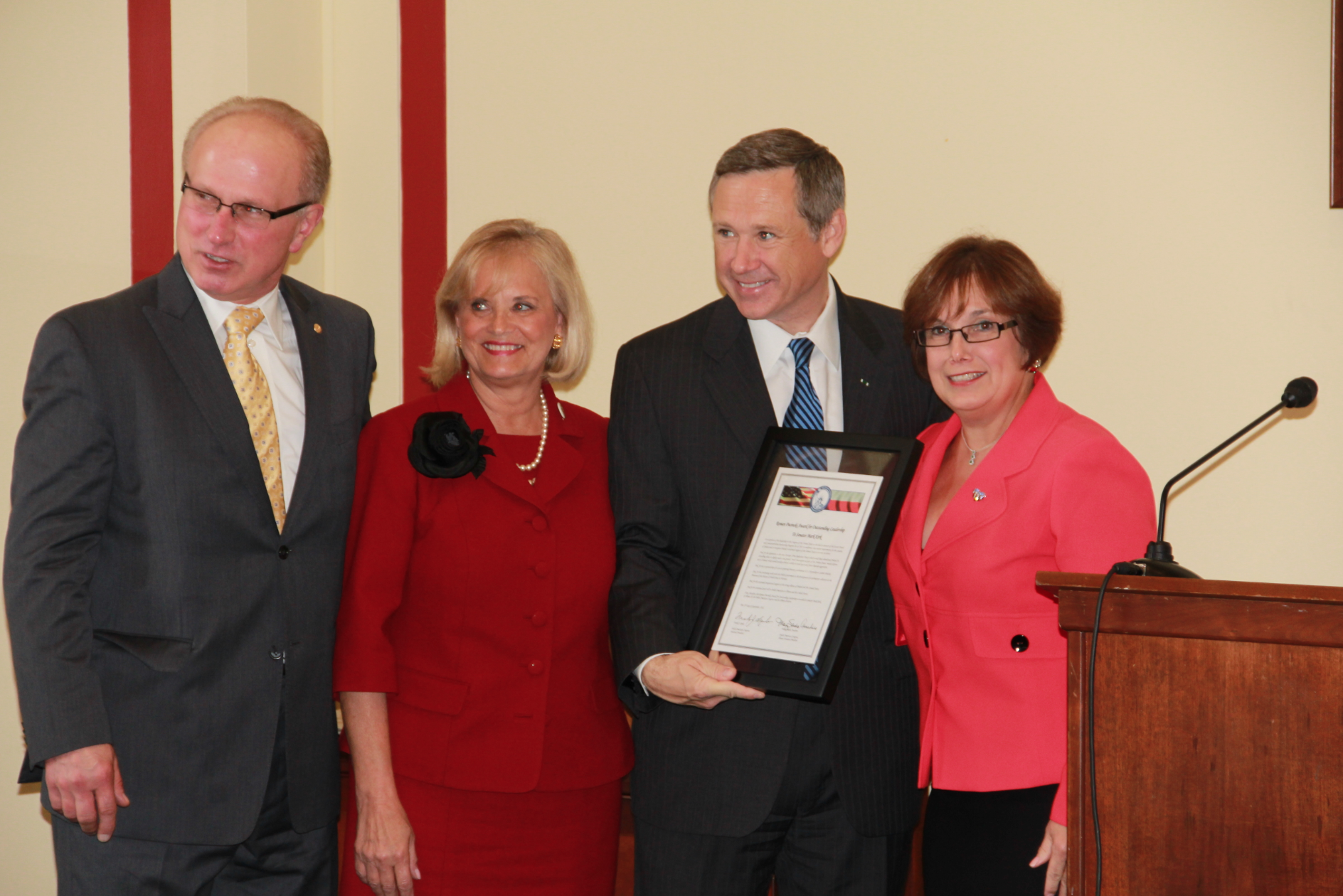
U.S. Senator Mark Kirk (R-IL) receiving an award from the Polish American Congress in 2011. He is supported by Polonia for his advocacy for the visa waiver program.

Poland gained some attention during the 2012 presidential election, as Republican challenger Mitt Romney visited the country during his campaign. He was endorsed by Lech Wałęsa, but was rebuked by the pro-trade union Solidarity (Poland) because of Romney's alignment with business interests such as right-to-work law perceived as hostile to unionists and workers' rights. Romney made a clear outreach to Polish-Americans during his campaign, although it was criticized as superficial. During the elections of 2020, 54% of the Polish-Americans voted for Joe Biden, and 42.4% voted for Donald Trump.

Whilst information regarding how the Polish electorate voted in the 2024 election is scarce, a significant moment in the election for the Polish-American vote was President Duda calling on Polish-Americans to "participate" in the election.

== Presidential voting results ==
Political pins

Kerry-Edwards

Polish-American vote in presidential elections (1916–2020)
Election year	Candidate 1	%	Candidate 2	%	Result
1916 (Note: The results are for Polish-Americans in the city of Chicago only)	Woodrow Wilson	74	Charles Evans Hughes	24	Won
1920	Warren Harding	61	James M. Cox	39	Won
1924	Calvin Coolidge	80	John W. Davis	20	Won
1928	Herbert Hoover	65	Al Smith	35	Won
1932	Franklin D. Roosevelt	>90	Herbert Hoover	<10	Won
1936	Franklin D. Roosevelt	>90	Alf Landon	<10	Won
1940	Franklin D. Roosevelt	>90	Wendell Willkie	<5	Won
1944	Franklin D. Roosevelt	>90	Thomas Dewey	<10	Won
1948	Harry Truman	80	Thomas Dewey	20	Won
1952	Dwight D. Eisenhower	70	Adlai Stevenson	30	Won
1956	Adlai Stevenson	~50	Dwight D. Eisenhower	49	lost
1960	John F. Kennedy	78	Richard Nixon	22	Won
1964	Lyndon Johnson	80	Barry Goldwater	20	Won
1968	Hubert Humphrey	56	Richard Nixon	44	lost
1972	Richard Nixon	53	George McGovern	47	Won
1976	Jimmy Carter	60	Gerald Ford	40	Won
1980 (Note: According to exit polls, 15% of Polish-Americans voted for independent John B. Anderson in the election)	Jimmy Carter	~45	Ronald Reagan	~41	lost
1984	Ronald Reagan	51	Walter Mondale	<49	Won
1988	George H. W. Bush	56	Michael Dukakis	43	Won
1992	Bill Clinton	42	George H. W. Bush	37	Won
1996	Bill Clinton	48	Bob Dole	41	Won
2000	George W. Bush	52	Al Gore	45	Won
2004	George W. Bush	47.9	John Kerry	47.1	Won
2008 (Note: Results based on the national surveys conducted by the Piast Institute)	Barack Obama	52.3	John McCain	41.9	Won
2012	Barack Obama	50.4	Mitt Romney	38.1	Won
2016	Donald Trump	58	Hillary Clinton	42	Won
2020	Joe Biden	54	Donald Trump	42.4	Won

== See also ==
- Western betrayal
- Diaspora politics in the United States
- Catholic Church and politics in the United States
- Ethnocultural politics in the United States

== Books ==
- Polish Americans and Their Communities of Cleveland by John J. Grabowski, Judith Zielinski-Zak, Alice Boberg, & Ralph Wroblewski, with an Introduction by Dr. Jerzy J. Maciuszko. printed 1954.
- Polish Americans Today. A Survey of Modern Polonia Leadership by Thaddeus C. Radzilowski & Dominik Stecula, printed 2010.

== Notes ==
- ^Note a:Tumulty attempted to contact Woodrow Wilson regarding ongoing unrest in the ethnic communities related to the Treaty of Versailles and World War I.

Great demonstration New York last night, addressed by Hughes, to protest killings in Poland, Galicia, Roumania and elsewhere. Feeling in this matter growing more intense throughout the country. Cannot something be done? It is evident that Germany is doing everything to separate the Allies. A great many newspapers in this country are worried lest you be carried away by the pleadings of Germany for a Quote softer peace End Quote. I know you will not be led astray. There is an intense feeling in the Senate in favour of the publication of the terms of the Treaty. Can anything be done to straighten this out?

— Tumulty, Joseph., "Woodrow Wilson as I Know Him", Cablegram from Tumulty to the President. 22 May 1919.

- ^Note b:In this same telegram, Tumulty reveals his suspicion that Poles and other groups would swing Republican based on the Republican Party's stance opposing the League of Nations:

Every Republican member of new Foreign Relations Committee openly opposed to treaty, a majority in favour of its amendment. Every Democratic member of Committee, including Thomas, for treaty and against separation. There is a decided reaction evident against the League, caused, in my opinion, by dissatisfaction of Irish, Jews, Poles, Italians, and Germans. Republicans taking full advantage and liable, in order to garner disaffected vote, to make absolute issue against League, Reaction intensified by your absence and lack of publicity from your end and confusion caused by contradictory statements and explanations of Quote so-called compromises End Quote. Simonds' article appearing in certain American newspapers Sunday, admirable, explaining reasons for Saar Valley and French pact and other controversial matters.

— Tumulty, Joseph., "Woodrow Wilson as I Know Him", Cablegram from Tumulty to the President. 22 May 1919.

- ^Note c:As transcribed by reporters from the 1968 campaign trail, Spiro stated, "When I'm moving in a crowd, I don't look and say, 'Well, there's a Negro, there's an Italian, there's a Greek, there's a Polack.'"
- ^Note d:"When the ballots were finally counted in 1972, Nixon polled roughly 53 percent of the Polish vote." Bukowczyk, p. 132
- ^Note e:"He misspoke on many occasions, notably declaring in a debate with Jimmy Carter, "There is no Soviet domination of Eastern Europe" and "I don't believe that the Poles consider themselves dominated by the Soviet Union," which journalist William F. Buckley, Jr., called "the ultimate Polish joke."" Encyclopædia Britannica. Gerald Ford | Biography, Presidency, Accomplishments, Foreign Policy, & Facts | Britannica
- ^Note f:"...in 1976 Ford, as presidential candidate, showed that sometimes ethnicity itself still had incredible salience to the Polish-American electorate. In a televised debate with Georgia Governor Jimmy Carter, the Democratic challenger, the verbally inept Ford angered organized Polonia by saying "there is no Soviet domination in eastern Europe"...Indeed, many Polish-Americans believed that the president had insulted them by glossing over the plight of their ancestral homeland." Bukowczyk, p. 132
- ^Note h:Although he apologized later, Gerald Ford stated under cross-examination during the debate that Poland and Romania, as well as Yugoslavia were "independent, autonomous" nations.The Age - Google News Archive Search
- ^Note i:Charles Bartlett, writing in The Press-Courier, Oct. 15, 1976, on Ford's statement, said that he was "not that far off." Bartlett did not dispute that Polish-Americans would be likely to change their votes as a result of the gaffe, but argued that it was Ford's four-day delay in responding that hurt him most. Bartlett believed that Ford could have recovered had he clarified his sources of information promptly, as there were high-ranking Polish government officials who had supplied information possibly leading to Ford's conclusion. Bartlett also argued that Ford wanted to free himself from poor reporting by the State Department, which had inconclusive and distorted information on human rights in Poland.The Press-Courier - Google News Archive Search
