= Irena Grudzińska-Gross =

Polish historian (born 1946)

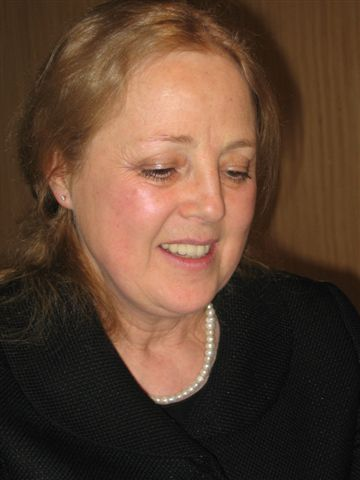
- Born: 15 December 1946 (age 79); Gdynia, Gdańsk Voivodeship, Republic of Poland
- Occupation: Historian
- Spouse: Jan T. Gross
- Awards: Guggenheim Fellow (2018)

Academic background
- Education: University of Warsaw; Sapienza University of Rome; Columbia University
- Thesis: Journey Through Bookland: The Travel Memoir in the Nineteenth Century (1982)

Academic work
- Discipline: History
- Sub-discipline: Intellectual history; history of literature; modern Europe
- Institutions: Emory University; New York University; Boston University; Princeton University

Irena Grudzińska-Gross (born 15 December 1946) is a Polish historian. After fleeing from her native Poland as a university student following the 1968 Polish political crisis, she obtained her PhD at Columbia University and became a professor at Emory University and Boston University, as well as a resident scholar at Remarque Institute and Princeton University. A 2018 Guggenheim Fellow in Intellectual and Cultural History, she has written historical books on modern Europe (particularly intellectual history and literature), including The Scar of Revolution (1991), Czeslaw Milosz and Joseph Brodsky: Fellowship of Poets (2009), and Golden Harvest (2011), the latter of which she co-wrote with her ex-husband Jan T. Gross.

== Biography ==
Irena Grudzińska was born on 15 December 1946, in Gdynia, Kashubia. She is the daughter of cardiologist Wacława Grudzińska and communist politician Jan Grudziński and the sister of banker Włodzimierz Grudziński. After entering the University of Warsaw in 1964, she spent some time in the Commandos dissident circle, and she was expelled from the Związek Młodzieży Socjalistycznej in 1967. During this period she became associated with the so-called banana youth. After fleeing the country following the 1968 Polish political crisis, she continued her studies abroad at the Sapienza University of Rome. She later moved to Columbia University, where she obtained her MA in 1975, MPhil in 1977, and PhD in 1982; her doctoral dissertation is titled Journey Through Bookland: The Travel Memoir in the Nineteenth Century.

After spending a year as a visiting lecturer at Yale University, she joined Emory University as an assistant professor in 1984, before being promoted to associate professor in 1992. In 1994, she moved to New York University and was a visiting scholar at the Remarque Institute from 1996 until 2003. In 1998, she started leading the Ford Foundation's East-Central European Program, doing so until 2003. In 2003, she moved to Boston University to become professor there and director of their Institute for Human Sciences, holding both positions until 2008. She was later an associate research scholar at Princeton University from 2008 until 2014, when she was promoted to research scholar. After serving as visiting professor from 2010 until 2012, she became a professor at the Institute of Slavic Studies, Polish Academy of Sciences in 2013. In 2017, she retired from Princeton.

As an academic, she specialises in intellectual history and literature in modern Europe. In 1981, she and Jan T. Gross edited War Through Children's Eyes, a collection of essays from the contemporary perspectives of children in the evacuation of Polish civilians from the USSR in World War II. In 1985, she published The Art of Solidarity, based on the Yale University exhibit of the same name. Her first book, The Scar of Revolution (1991), discusses Alexis de Tocqueville and Marquis de Custine. In 2009, she published another book, Czeslaw Milosz and Joseph Brodsky: Fellowship of Poets discussing the relationship between Joseph Brodsky and Czesław Miłosz. She was editor of Peter Lang's Eastern European Culture, Politics and Societies series, and she also edited two of Adam Michnik's books, In Search of Lost Meaning (2011) and Trouble with History (2014).

Grudzińska-Gross's book, Golden Harvest (2011), co-written with her ex-husband, Jan T. Gross, is about Poles enriching themselves at the expense of Jews murdered in the Holocaust. The book was praised for tackling a difficult topic; however the extent of the phenomenon in question was disputed, with some critics arguing that Gross exaggerated what was otherwise a marginal phenomenon.

In 1996, she was awarded the Knight's Cross of the Order of Merit of the Republic of Poland, and in 2007 was promoted to Officer's Cross. In 2018, she was appointed a Guggenheim Fellow in Intellectual and Cultural History.

=== Personal life ===
Grudzińska-Gross was the long-term partner of Jonathan Schell, and was married to Jan T. Gross.

== Publications ==
- (ed. with Jan T. Gross) War Through Children's Eyes (1981)
- The Scar of Revolution (1991)
- Czeslaw Milosz and Joseph Brodsky: Fellowship of Poets (2009)
- Golden Harvest (2011, with Jan T. Gross)
