= Joseph A. Amato =

American author and scholar (1938–2025)

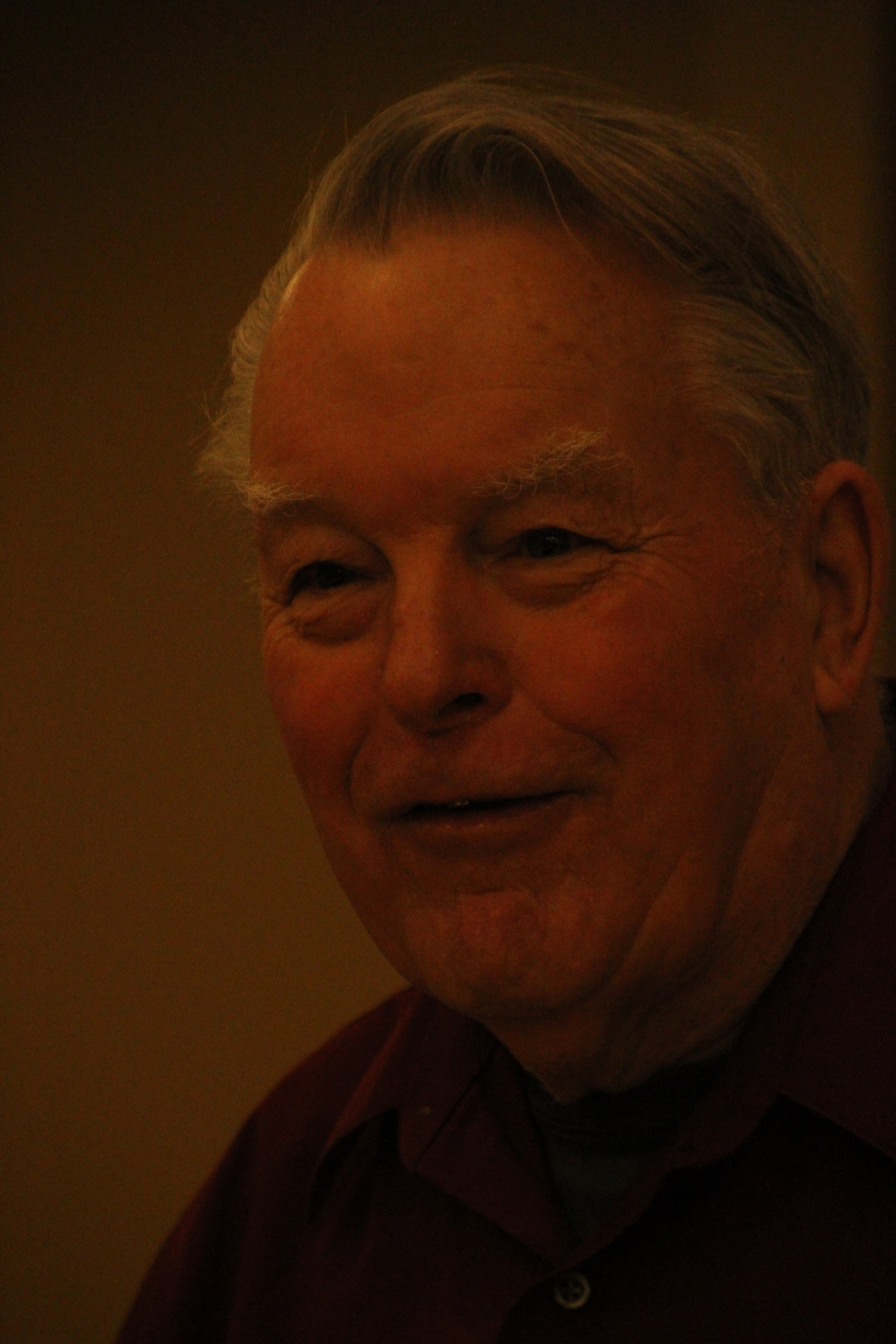
- Amato in 2017
- Born: August 31, 1938; Detroit, Michigan, U.S.
- Died: January 24, 2025 (aged 86)
- Education: University of Michigan (BA); Université Laval (MA); University of Rochester (PhD)
- Occupations: Author, scholar
- Website: www.josephaamato.com

Joseph Anthony Amato (August 31, 1938 – January 24, 2025) was an American author and scholar. Amato was a history professor and university dean of local and regional history. He wrote extensively on European intellectual and cultural history, and the history of Southwestern Minnesota. After retiring, he continued publishing history books, as well as five poetry collections and his first novel.

== Background ==
Amato received his B.A. in history from the University of Michigan in 1960; his M.A. in history from the Université Laval, Québec, in 1963; and a Ph.D. in history from the University of Rochester in 1970. He also did post-doctoral study in the history of European cultures with Professor Eugen Weber.

Amato died on January 24, 2025, at the age of 86.

== Teaching career ==
After teaching high school at Royal Oak, Michigan, Amato was an instructor at Binghamton University and the University of California, Riverside. In 1969 Amato began teaching at the new Southwest Minnesota State University (SMSU) in Marshall, Minnesota (originally Southwest Minnesota State College). He was a founder and chair of the History Department, one of the architects of the university's Rural Studies curriculum in the 1970s, and a principal founder of the Society for Local and Regional History. He established Crossings Press and, in conjunction with the Society for Local and Regional History, supported over seventy publications on demographic, environmental and geographic facets in Southwest Minnesota. Amato retired from SMSU in 2003 as Professor Emeritus of Rural and Regional Studies and of History.

== Writing career ==
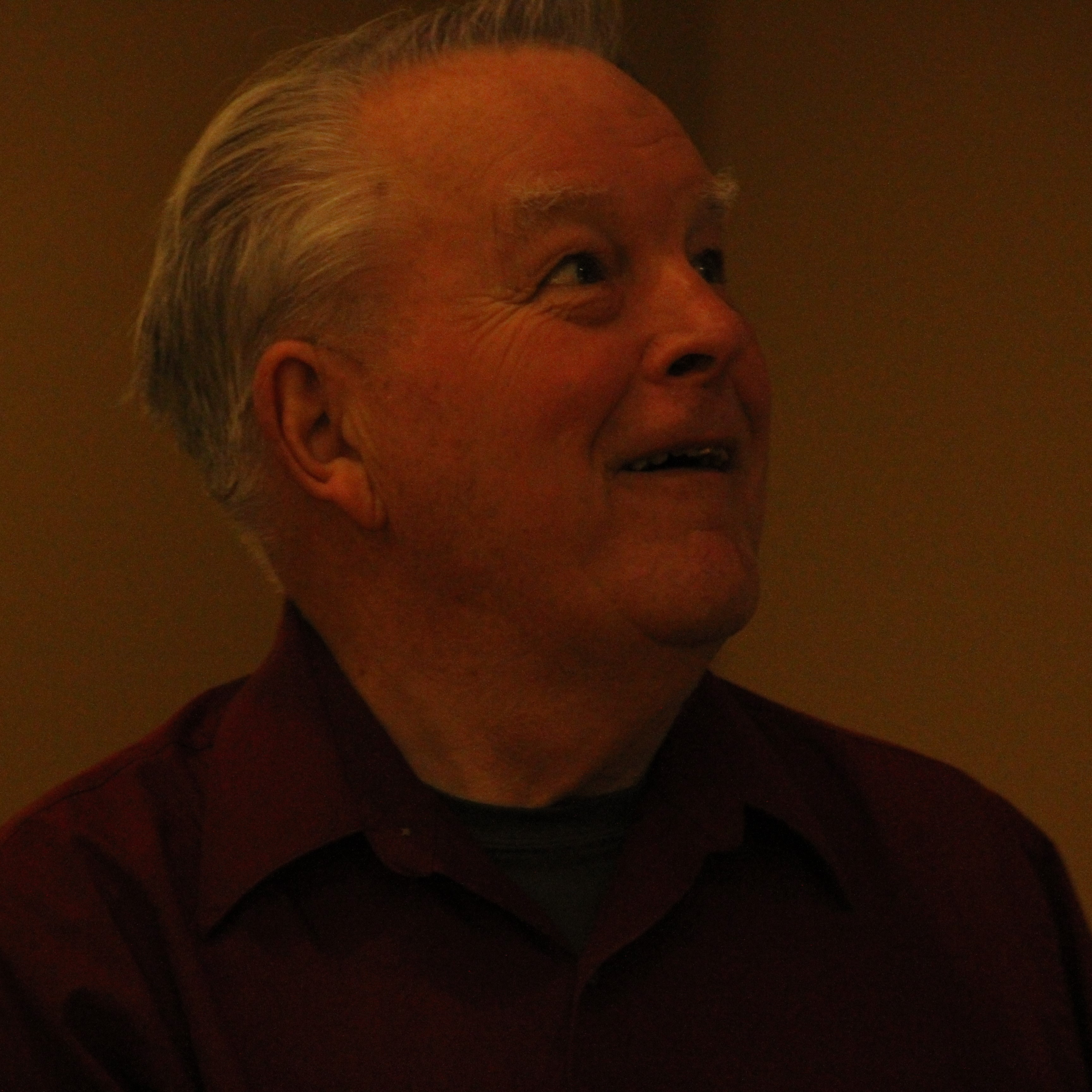
Amato discussing his work

Collections of his writings, notebooks, interviews, and reviews of his writing are held at SMSU's regional research and history center and the Literary Manuscript Collections of the Elmer Anderson Library, at the University of Minnesota. In addition to numerous reviews and articles in scholarly and popular journals, Amato's writing falls roughly into four fields:

First, local, regional, and rural history. Rethinking Home: The Case for Local History (2003) was widely reviewed and featured at several national conferences. On multiple fronts he has continued to study, teach and write about local and regional history and the power of place in determining experience and identity.

Second, European cultural and intellectual history. Among his notable books are Dust: A History of the Small and Invisible, which won the Los Angeles Times Best Nonfiction of 2000 and On Foot: A Cultural History of Walking. Dust has been translated into Italian, German, and other languages.

Third, family, self, and community. Among his books in this area: Jacob's Well: A Case for Rethinking Family History (2008) traces seven generations of his family's migrations from Europe, in Acadia, pre-revolutionary Massachusetts, the rural and industrial Midwest and the American West. Amato describes his youth in two memoirs, Bypass: A Memoir and Golf Beats Us All (And So We Love It).

Fourth, Amato's recent work includes poetry and his first novel. He has written five volumes of poetry, Buoyancies, A Ballast Master's Log; My Three Sicilies: Stories, Poems, and Histories; Diagnostics: Poetics of Time; Towers of Aging (Crossings Press, 2020); and The Trinity of Grace (Legas Publishing, 2020). His first novel, Buffalo Man: Life of a Boy Giant on the Minnesota River, was published by Crossings Press in 2018.

Amato's books have won him nominations, selections, and honors, of particular note the Minnesota Humanities Prize for Literature and Prairie Star Award from the Southwest Minnesota Arts Council.

== Selected works ==
- Mounier and Maritain: A French Catholic Understanding of the Modern World (University of Alabama Press, 1975; republished by Ave Maria Press, 2002
- Ethics, Living or Dead? Themes in Contemporary Values (Portals Press/ Crossings Press, 1982).
- Guilt and Gratitude: A History of the Origins of Modern Conscience (Greenwood Press, 1982).
- Death Book: Terrors, Consolations, Contradictions and Paradoxes (Ellis Press, Crossings Press, 1985).
- When Father and Son Conspire: A Minnesota Farm Murder (Iowa State University Press, 1988).
- Victims and Values: A History and Theory of Suffering, (Greenwood Press, 1990).
- Servants of the Land: God, Family, and Farm, The Trinity of Belgian Economic Folkways (Crossing Press, 1990).
- A New College on the Prairie: Southwest State University's First Twenty-Five Years, 1967–1992 (Crossings Pres, 1991.
- The Great Jerusalem Artichoke Circus (University of Minnesota Press, 1993).
- The Decline of Rural Minnesota, with John Meyer, (Crossings Press, 1993).
- To Call It Home: The New Immigrants of Southwestern Minnesota, with John Meyer, John Radzilowski, Donata DeBruyckere, and Anthony Amato (Crossings Press, 1996).
- Golf Beats Us All (And So We Love It) (Johnson Books, 1997). Finalist for the 1998 Minnesota Book Awards.
- Community of Strangers: Change, Turnover, Turbulence & the Transformation of a Midwestern Country Town, with John Radzilowski and assistance of John Meyer (Crossings Press, 1999).
- Bypass: A Memoir (Purdue University Press, 2000).
- Dust: A History of the Small and Invisible (University of California Press, 2000).
- The Draining of the Great Oasis: An Environmental History of Murray County, Minnesota, ed. with Anthony Amato and Janet Timmerman (Crossings Press, 2001).
- Rethinking Home: The Case for Local History (University of California Press, 2002).
- A Place Called Home: Writings on the Midwestern Small Town, 2003 anthology edited by Richard Davies, Joseph Amato and David Pichaske (Minnesota Historical Society Press, 2003).
- On Foot: A Cultural History of Walking (New York University Press, 2004).
- Southwest Minnesota: A Place of Many Places, written with David Pichaske,(Ellis Press/Crossings Press, 2007).
- Jacob's Well: A Case for Rethinking Family History (Minnesota Historical Society Press, 2008).
- Coal Cousins: Rusyn and Sicilian Stories & Pennsylvania Anthracite Histories, (Crossings Press, 2008).
- Surfaces, A History (University of California Press, 2013).
- Buoyancies, A Ballast Master's Log (Spoon River Poetry Press/Crossings Press, 2014).
- The Book of Twos: The Power of Contrasts, Polarities, and Contradictions (Ellis Press, 2015).
- My Three Sicilies: Stories, Poems, and Histories (Bordighera Press, 2016).
- Everyday Life: How the Ordinary Became Extraordinary (Reaktion Press, 2016).
- Diagnostics: Poetics of Time (Bordighera Press, 2017).
- Buffalo Man: Life of a Boy Giant on the Minnesota River (Crossings Press, 2018).
- Towers of Aging (Crossings Press, 2020).
- Trinity of Grace (Legas Publishing, 2020).
- Self: One and Many (Crossings Press, 2023).
- Body: Vessel of Sea and Self (Crossings Press, 2023).
- Spring of Springs: Early Chapters in an Autobiography (Crossings Press, 2024).
