= Znak (publisher) =

Polish book publishing company

Społeczny Instytut Wydawniczy „Znak”
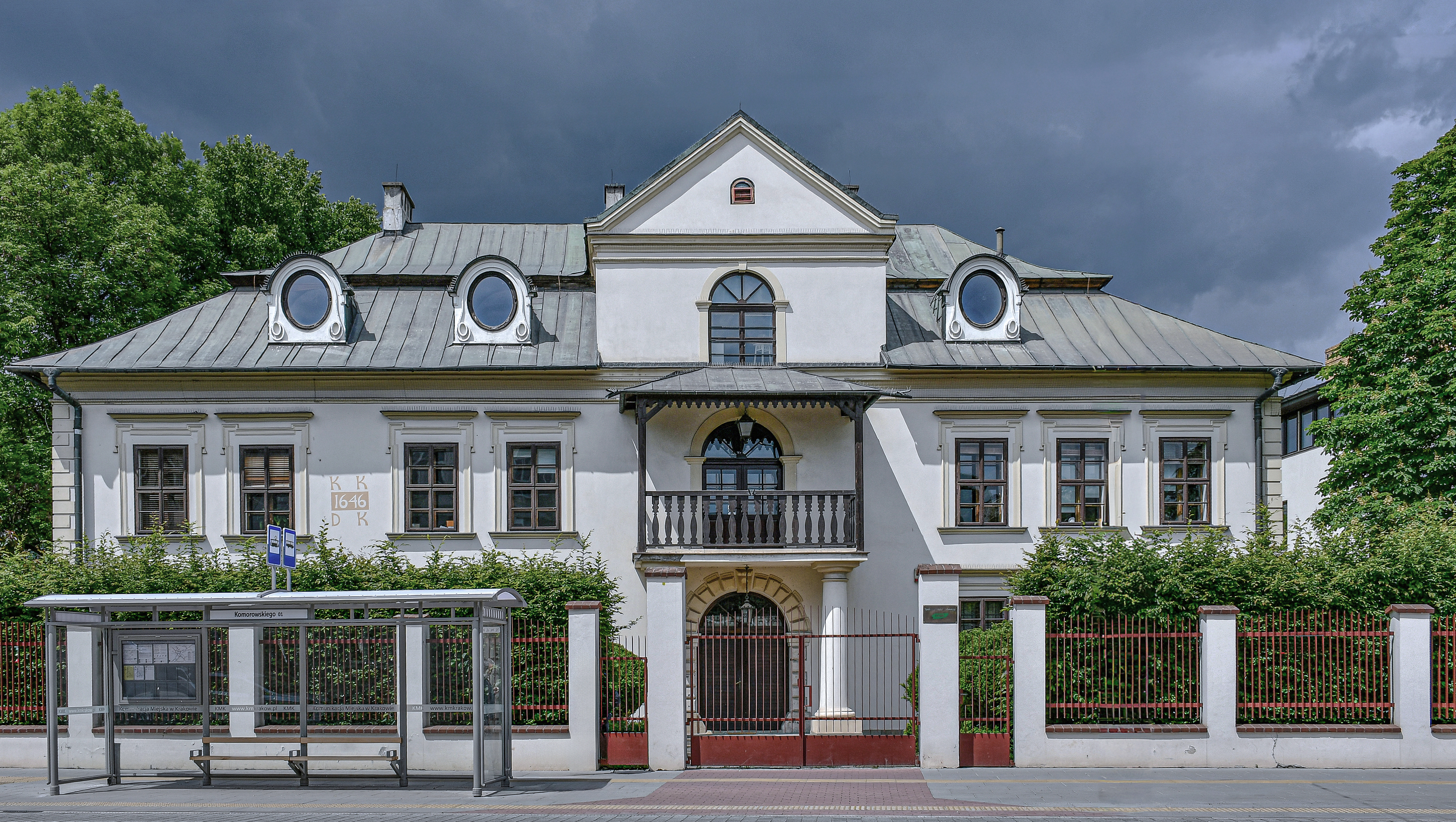
- Dwór Łowczego (transl. The Huntsman's Manor); Head office of Znak in Kraków; 37 T. Kościuszki Street
- Status: Active
- Founded: 1959
- Country of origin: Poland
- Headquarters location: 37 T. Kościuszki Street; Kraków
- Official website: wydawnictwoznak.pl

Społeczny Instytut Wydawniczy „Znak” (transl. Znak Social Publishing Institute) is one of the largest Polish book publishing companies. It is related to the Catholic Church in Poland and publishes books in fields including fiction, poetry, non-fiction, and children's books. The company employs about 50 people and generates an annual sales turnover of $27.72 million.

== Company history ==
Founded in 1959 by people associated with the Polish Roman Catholic weekly magazine Tygodnik Powszechny and the monthly periodical Znak, the company called itself a Społeczny Instytut (transl. social institute) to remove itself from the Polish communist government's tight control of book publishing at that time.

During martial law years (1981-83) Znak was "a bridge between public and underground writing". Authors published in the 1990s included Joseph Brodsky, Umberto Eco, Leszek Kolakowski, Stanislaw Lem and Czesław Miłosz.

One of Znak's bestselling titles (selling 180,000 copies by early 1998) was Boże igrzysko: Historia Polski (1989), the Polish language translation of Norman Davies's God's Playground, a comprehensive two-volume history of Poland. The work had been originally published in the United Kingdom in 1981 and was only published officially in Poland after the fall of communism. It also published the translated version of Jan T. Gross' book Golden Harvest.

In 2010 the company established three imprints, Znak, Znak Literanova and Znak Emotikon, and in 2014 it set up Znak Horyzont. It also has an imprint called Wydawnictwo Otwarte (transl. Open Publishing) which issues "popular literature" and a platform called Woblink which provides e-books.Henryk Woźniakowski, who had headed the company since 1991, stepped down in June 2021 and was succeeded as president by Dominika Kozłowska; Jerzy lllg, editor-in-chief since 1992, retired at the same time.

== Book series ==
- Biblioteka ODISS (transl. ODISS Library)
- Biblioteka Mysli Politycznej (transl. Library of Political Thought)
- Biblioteka Wiezi (transl. Ties Library)
- Demokracja - Znak (transl. Democracy - Znak)
- Demokracja: Filozofia i Praktyka (transl. Democracy: Philosophy and Practice)
- Dobre Strony (transl. The Good Side)
- Teksty z Tygodnik Powszechny (transl. Texts from Tygodnik Powszechny)
- Znak Idee (transl. Znak Ideas)
- Znak Problemy (transl. Znak Problems)
- Znak Proza (transl. Znak Prose)

== See also ==
- Znak (association)
