= Marcin Zaremba =

- Born: 1966 (age 59–60)

Academic background
- Education: University of Warsaw
- Thesis: (2000)

Academic work
- Discipline: History
- Sub-discipline: Polish history
- Institutions: University of Warsaw
- Main interests: National communism
- Notable works: Entangled in Fear
- Website: ORCID 0000-0001-5411-6306

Marcin Zaremba (born 1966) is a Polish historian whose work focuses on how the communist regime used Polish nationalism to legitimize itself. He lectures in history at the Warsaw University.

== Life and career ==
Zaremba was a student of Marcin Kula, Antonina Kłoskowska, Ireneusz Krzeminski, and Paweł Śpiewak. He received degrees in history (1992) and sociology (1999) from the University of Warsaw. Zaremba received his PhD in 2000 and habilitated his PhD in 2013.

== Works ==
Zaremba is the author of the book Wielka Trwoga. Polska 1944–1947. Ludowa reakcja na kryzys (published in English as Entangled in Fear: Everyday Terror in Poland, 1944–1947.)

Katarzyna Person reviewed the book for the Austrian History Yearbook, writing that the book is "an excellent, innovative (though not uncontroversial) study on fear in postwar Poland that comprises one of the most important works of social history and a key Polish contribution to the field of the history of emotions in recent years."

Anita J. Prazmowska reviewed the book for The American Historical Review, writing that "Zaremba introduces an entirely new analysis of the way wars impact society, and with that he challenges the notion that once military activities end, war can be considered to have, likewise ended. On the basis of Polish experiences of the immediate post war period, from 1944 to 1947, he suggests that wars damage people’s sense of equilibrium, safety, and well-being."
