= Golden Harvest (book) =

2011 book by Jan T. Gross and Irena Grudzińska-Gross

- Cover of the English language edition of the book
- Authors: Jan T. Gross and Irena Grudzińska-Gross
- Original title: Złote żniwa
- Subject: Holocaust
- Genre: History
- Set in: General Government
- Publisher: Znak, Oxford University Press
- Publication date: 2011
- English publication date: 2012
- Media type: Book
- Pages: 160
- ISBN: 9780199731671
- Preceded by: Fear

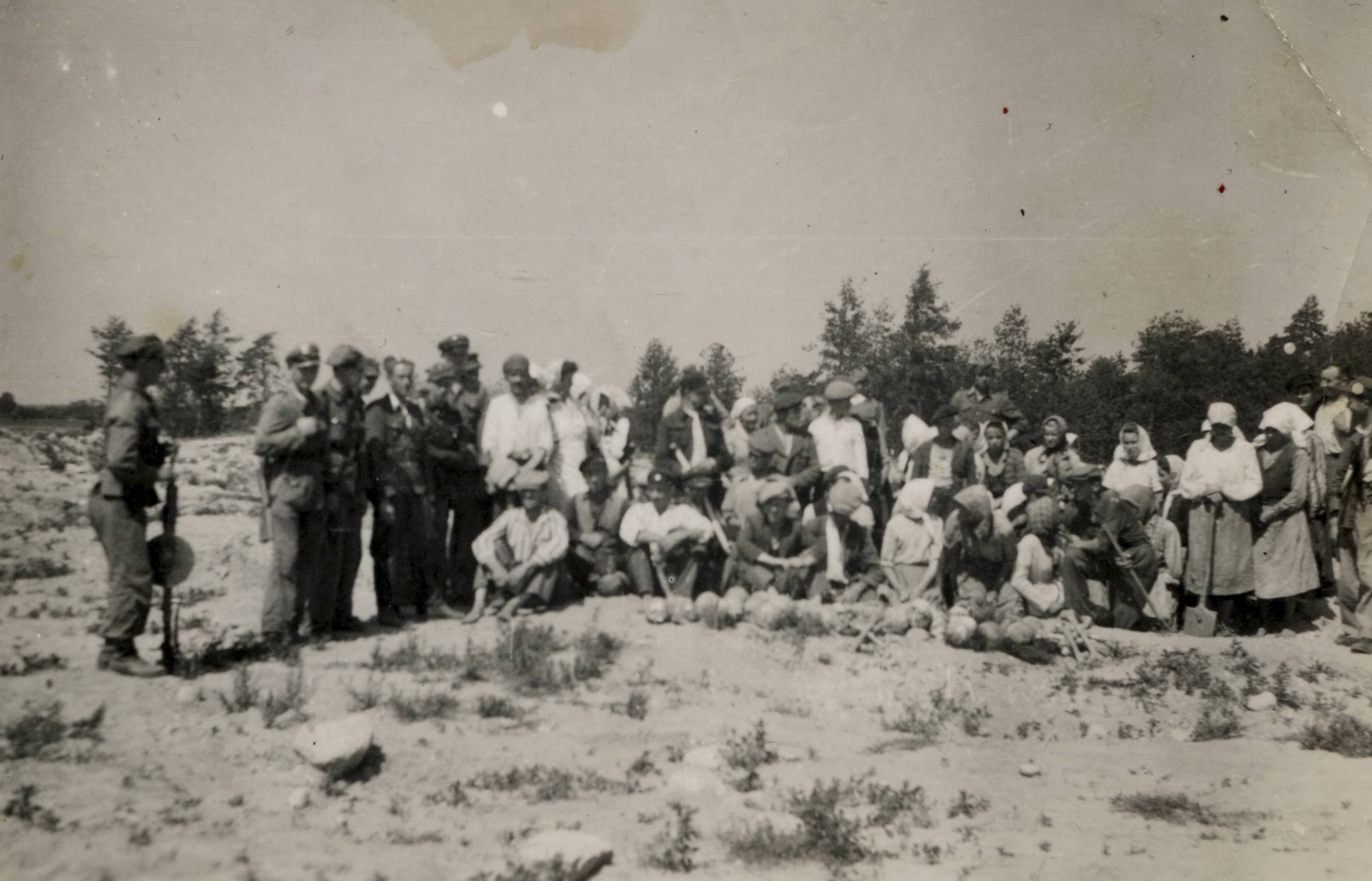
Photo printed in a 2008 article, "Gorączka złota w Treblince" ("Gold Rush in Treblinka") by Gazeta Wyborcza journalists Marcin Kowalski and Piotr Głuchowski. The photo served as an inspiration for Gross' Golden Harvest and was reprinted on his book's cover. The nature of the supposed diggers has been disputed by scholars.

Golden Harvest (Polish: Złote żniwa) is a 2011 book about the Holocaust in Poland. It was written by historians Jan T. Gross and Irena Grudzińska-Gross. It was first published in Polish in March 2011, with an English translation following in 2012.

The book is named after the phenomenon, documented around the Treblinka extermination camp, of villagers digging up mass graves of Jewish victims in order to retrieve the golden tooth fillings of the deceased. The book was praised for tackling a difficult topic; however the extent of the phenomenon in question was disputed, with some critics arguing that Gross exaggerated what was otherwise a marginal phenomenon.

== Analysis ==
Gross begins the book with a subject statement: “The collusion of the Polish population in the pillaging and killing of Jews at the periphery of the Holocaust." He claims that the interpretation of the Polish role in pillaging and killing Jews as a "deviant" behavior of "scum" during wartime is wrong; indeed, he sees the murder of Jews and plunder of Jewish property throughout Europe as a collective "effort", headed by the Nazi regime but openly and visibly benefiting many others.

According to Gross, the Polish "obsession" with Jewish property is "the key to understanding the brutality and persistence of Polish antisemitism".

== Reception ==
Critics in Poland have alleged that Gross dwelt too much on wartime pathologies, drawing "unfair generalizations".

Christopher Browning notes that Polish readers will find Gross's descriptions of Polish participation in the killing of their Jewish neighbors as challenging. According to Browning, contemporary research shows that Jews hiding in rural Poland were exposed by Polish village elites and officials and were often subjected to torture, rape, and public humiliation in an attempt to force them to reveal their presumed "hidden wealth". Catholic Poles resented those who hid Jews, as they were seen as engaging in "unjustified enrichment" at the expense of the rest of the community who did not receive their "fair share" of Jewish property. Per Browning, an examination of such episodes reveals the shared values and norms of a society. Browning concludes by writing that the book indicates that enormous strides have been taken in the study of the Holocaust in Poland, and in Polish-Jewish relations. As a caveat, Browning notes that it's not actually clear if the photograph that motivated Gross to write the book actually documents a "golden harvest".

Zoe Waxman writes that Gross has at times been accused of anti-Polish bias, and admits that at times he shows a lack of sympathy to the dilemmas faced by ordinary Poles; however this lack of sympathy is understandable given the nature of subjects of his research - people who capitalized on, and even rejoiced in, their neighbors' murder. Waxman too states her doubts about the book's cover photo's nature, and criticizes Gross for his over-reliance on eyewitness testimony. However, she sees Golden Harvest as a "powerful and haunting work" that "demands to be read".

The head of Znak, the book's publisher, stated: "It does not purport to provide a comprehensive overview of Polish rural communities' actions... The authors focus on the most horrid events, on robberies and killings. Those who say the book is anti-Polish make no sense."

Yad Vashem historian Witold Mędykowski reviewed Golden Harvest. Mędykowski wrote that since there are no exact statistics, it's impossible to state the extent of the phenomenon, but that Gross generalizes much less than his critics claim. Medykowski also writes that Gross approaches his subject very generally and does not address how the relevant property changed ownership. Medykowski also refers to the photograph which inspired Gross, saying that actually it was taken by an "unknown photographer at an unknown time in an unknown place and depicts unknown figures". According to Medykowski the "treasure hunt" in Treblinka is only the starting point for a wider discussion of robbery, looting, and appropriation of Jewish property. According to Medykowski Polish society is not well informed of the past, but rather is informed on myths of the past. Medykowski sees the book as a "shock therapy" destroying myths about Polish rescue of Jews.

Ingo Loose reviewed Golden Harvest, alongside Jan Grabowski's Hunt for the Jews, and Barbara Engelking's It Was Such a Beautiful Sunny Day. Loose wrote that all three works relate to the open wound of Polish-Jewish relations during the Holocaust, a very sensitive point in Polish historical memory. Loose writes that Gross makes it clear that a well-informed reader will find nothing new in the book, and in this manner, the book is perhaps disappointing to a professional reader, though worth reading as it has a social "therapeutic" dimension rather than opening a new page in the state of research. Loose notes that there has been a public debate regarding the book's cover photograph, and that neither Gross nor Gross's critics probably know exactly what it portrays. Loose also criticizes the work for lack of archival research and for jumping to conclusions, and states that the methodology "leaves much to be desired."

== Bibliography ==
- 2011, Złote żniwa. Rzecz o tym, co się działo na obrzeżach zagłady Żydów, Znak, Kraków, ISBN 978-83-240-1522-1
- 2012 Golden Harvest. — New York: Oxford University Press, 2012. - 160 p. ISBN 978-0-19-973167-1.
