= National Asian Pacific Center on Aging =

American nonprofit organization

- Established: 1979
- President: David L. Kim
- Key people: Jo Park (Chief of Programs), Mary Ann Bui (Chief Research Officer)
- Website: www.napca.org

The National Asian Pacific Center on Aging (NAPCA) was founded in 1979 and is a Seattle, Washington-based non-profit and American advocacy and service organization for elderly Asian Americans and Pacific Islanders (AAPI).

NAPCA works to assist AAPI seniors and educate the general public on the needs of the AAPI aging community. NAPCA offers AAPI seniors assistance with federal programs such as Medicare, Medicaid, and Social Security. It also provides them with a multilingual helpline.

== Programs and Services ==
NAPCA partners with other agencies to provide programs and services to AAPI seniors that address their cultural challenges and language barriers.

=== The Senior Community Service Employment Program (SCSEP) ===
The NAPCA Senior Community Service Employment Program (SCSEP) is part of the National Senior Community Service Employment (SCSEP) program through the U.S. Department of Labor and serves limited- and non-English speaking Asian American and Pacific Islander over age 55 who need employment. SCSEP helps participants to gain work experience and on-the-job training at nonprofit organizations or government agencies. SCSEP participants have served in daycares, childcare, senior centers, public libraries, social service agencies, and government offices. SCESP serves over 1,200 AAPI seniors annually in Los Angeles, Seattle, San Francisco, Orange County, California, Chicago, Boston, New York City, Philadelphia, and Houston.

=== Senior Environmental Employment (SEE) Program ===
The NAPCA Senior Environmental Employment (SEE) Program assists the Environmental Protection Agency (EPA) and other federal, state, and local agencies in meeting their environmental mandates by employing workers over 55 years old. The SEE program was created with the passage of the 1984 Federal Environment Programs Assistance Act. This law allowed the EPA to establish a program of grants with other environmental agencies.

=== Agriculture Conservation Experienced Services (ACES/NRCS) ===
The NAPCA Agriculture Conservation Experienced Services (ACES) Program assists the US Department of Agriculture (USDA) Natural Resources Conservation Service (NRCS) by providing workers over age 55 to support conservation-related programs.

=== National Multilingual Helpline ===
In 2001, NAPCA established its National Toll-free Multilingual Helpline for AAPI seniors. The Helpline helps them get answers on topics such as Medicare Part D eligibility requirements and enrollment. The Helpline has language lines in English, Mandarin Chinese language and Cantonese language, Korean language, and Vietnamese language.
