= Gerbilling =

Unsubstantiated sexual practice

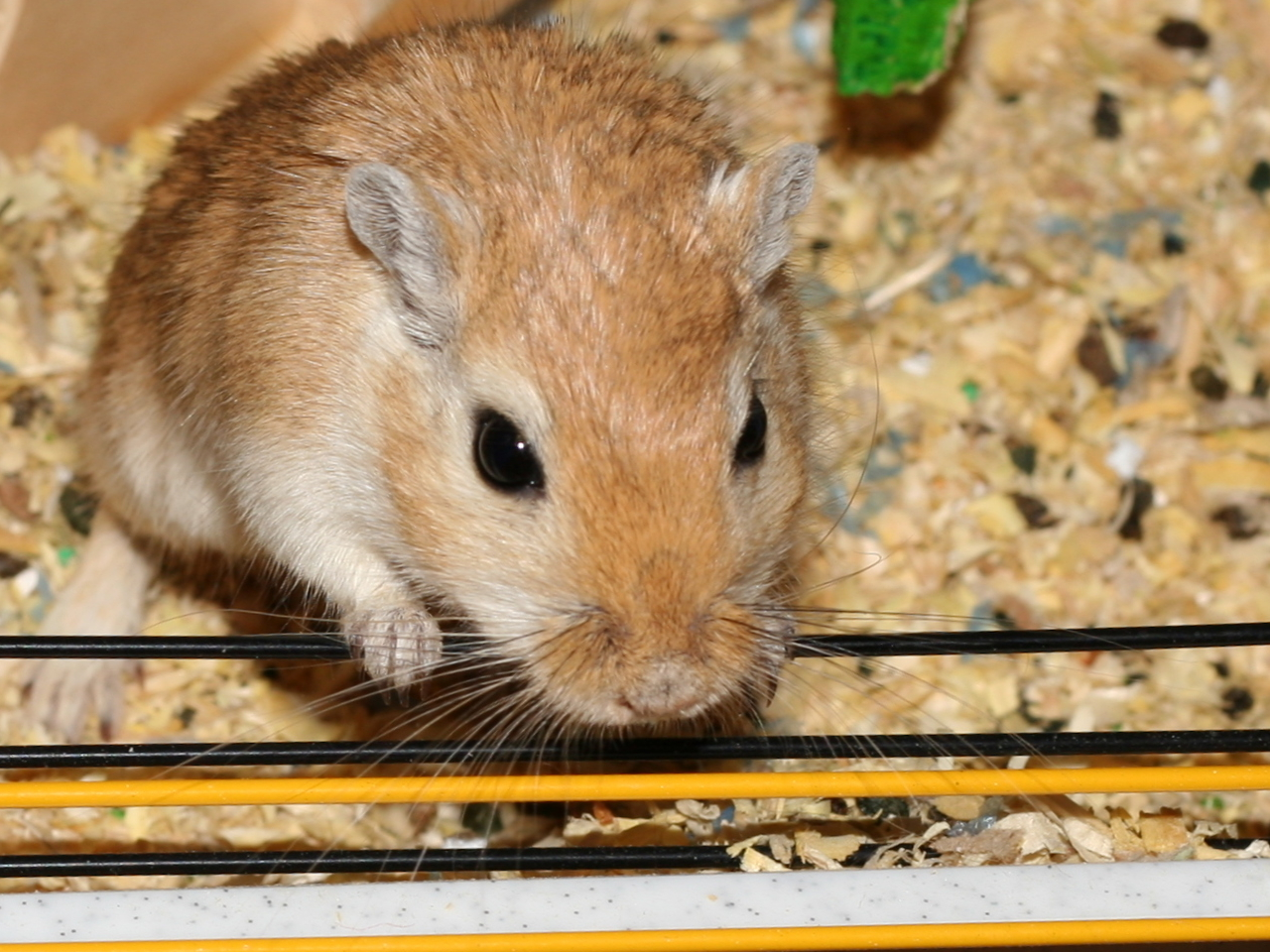
Gerbils are the most common rodents to be allegedly inserted.

Gerbilling, also known as gerbil stuffing or gerbil shooting, is the alleged sexual practice of inserting a gerbil or other small rodent into one's rectum to obtain stimulation. Gerbilling is considered an urban legend and there is no evidence that the practice has ever occurred in real life. Its existence remains highly dubious, as all rodents have long nails and teeth for digging or burrowing and naturally try to burrow out of any small spaces.

== Overview ==
According to folklorist Jan Harold Brunvand, fictitious accounts of gerbilling were first recorded in 1984 and initially were said to involve a mouse and an unidentified man. In subsequent versions of the story, the animal was a gerbil and the story applied to several male celebrities. Rumors surrounding various male celebrities engaging in gerbilling have become persistent urban legends.

As of the mid-1980s, there were no reports in peer-reviewed medical literature describing gerbilling among the variety of rectal foreign objects removed from people's bodies.

Mike Walker, a National Enquirer gossip columnist, spent months attempting to verify the gerbilling rumors about a celebrity. "I've never worked harder on a story in my life," Walker told the Palm Beach Post in 1995. After much investigation, he was unable to find any evidence that a gerbilling incident ever happened: "I'm convinced that it's nothing more than an urban legend."

Dan Savage, a sex-advice columnist who frequently discusses unusual sexual practices, stated in 2013 that he has never received a first-hand or even a second-hand account of the practice.

According to the editors of Snopes.com, gerbilling is an unverified and persistent urban legend.

M Jenny Edwards, an attorney who specialises in "sexual offenses relating to bestiality, zoophilia and zoosexuality", connects the folkloric practise of 'gerbiling' to formicophilia. She defines this as "a form of bestiality, which essentially deals with things crawling on you or in you". However, she acknowledges that she hasn't "personally dealt with a gerbil case, nor read about them".

== See also ==
- Sodomy
- Zoophilia
