= Metro Chicago Information Center =

Independent nonprofit research and consulting resource based in Chicago, Illinois

- Founded: 1990; 36 years ago
- Dissolved: February 29, 2012; 14 years ago
- Type: Non-profit
- Location: Chicago, Illinois
- Services: Research and Information Resources

Metro Chicago Information Center (MCIC) was an independent nonprofit research and consulting resource based in Chicago, Illinois. MCIC was founded in 1990 by a consortium of business and philanthropic leaders at the Commercial Club of Chicago to regularly collect demographics and baseline data on social policy and human needs for the 6-county metropolitan Chicago region. MCIC provided the data necessary to support public policy and social program development but did not advocate specific policy choices. Faced with a $650,000 defined benefit pension liability for staff hired before 2005, MCIC closed on February 29, 2012.

== Research ==
MCIC conducted demographic research for both local nonprofits and larger foundations such as the MacArthur Foundation and the Sprague Foundation, whose findings typically went towards fundraising, advocacy, and policy making. MCIC specialized in difficult to reach and underserved populations.

MCIC provided a variety of research and consulting services for branch site analysis, and strategic market planning. GIS/mapping technology, merged with unique databases like HMDA or U.S. Census information, provides in-depth analysis of delineated market areas, individual branch markets, or new site locations.

MCIC was part of a group of national and community-based organizations that served as auxiliary census data distribution centers.

== Affiliations ==
MCIC was a founding member of the Illinois Data Exchange Affiliates (IDEA), a voluntary coalition of government agencies and nonprofit organizations working to improve and facilitate public access to public data through web-based XML data transfer.

MCIC was the only National Neighborhood Indicators Partnership (NNIP) partner in the metropolitan Chicago region. The NNIP is a collaborative effort by the Urban Institute in Washington D.C. and 28 local partners around the country who work to further the development and use of neighborhood-level information systems in local policymaking and community building.
