= Thaddeus Radzilowski =

Polish-American historian (1938–2018)

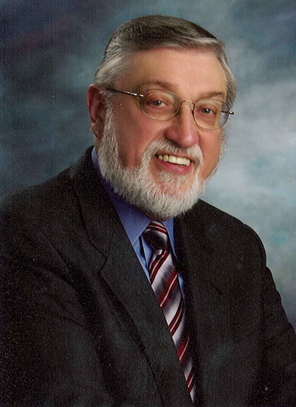
Thaddeus Radzilowski

Thaddeus C. Radzilowski or Thaddeus C. Radzialowski or Tadeusz Radziłowski (4 February 1938 – 20 July 2018) was a Polish-American historian, scholar, author, professor and co-founder of the Piast Institute, a national institute for Polish and Polish-American affairs. Radzilowski's work focused on Poland and other Central and Eastern European nations, including Russia. He wrote extensively on the histories of these regions as well as the migration of peoples from Central and Eastern Europe, with special emphasis on social history and historiography. He lectured widely in Europe and North America and published more than 100 monographs, edited collections, journal articles, book chapters and scholarly papers.

In 1999, Radzilowski received the Order of Merit of the Republic of Poland for contributions to the dissemination of Polish culture in the world. In 2013, Radzilowski was awarded the Lech Walesa Media Award by former president of Poland Lech Wałęsa.

== Life and education ==
Radzilowski was born in Detroit, Michigan, to Hieronim and Genowefa (Ochałek) Radzilowski, and received his B.A. from Wayne State University (1959). He received M.A. degrees in 1960 and 1971, and a Ph.D. in 1979, from the University of Michigan. His dissertation topic was "The Life and Works of N. P. Pavlov-Silvanskii (1869-1908)."

Radzilowski died on 20 July 2018.

== Scholarship ==
Radzilowski co-edited State and Autocracy in Imperial Russian and Soviet Historiography (a special issue of Laurentian University Review, 1977), and was the author of Feudalism, Revolution, and the Meaning of Russian History: An Intellectual Biography of Nikolai Pavlovich Pavlov-Silvanskii (East European Monographs, 1994). He contributed articles and book reviews to many journals and newspapers, including the Arab American News, Detroit News, Journal of American Ethnic History, Journal of the West, Oral History Review, Polish American Journal, Polish American Studies, Polish Review, Przeglad Polonijny, Shofar, Slavic Review, U.S. Catholic, U.S. Catholic Historian, and The World & I. He also contributed chapters to various essay collections, including Polish Americans and their History: Community, Culture, and Politics (1996); Something of My Very Own to Say: American Women Writers of Polish Descent (1997); and Rethinking Poles and Jews: Troubled Past, Brighter Future (2007).

== Piast Institute ==
Thaddeus C. Radzilowski co-founded the Piast Institute with Virginia Skrzyniarz in 2003. The institute is the largest think tank in North America devoted to Polish and Polish-American issues, and is based in Hamtramck, Michigan.

Radzilowski has focused Piast as a research center, one of 59 U.S. Census Information Centers, and as a representative of Poland and Polish-Americans in the United States. With its internal staff and its worldwide network of Fellows, Piast develops and disseminates information through the development of position papers, conferences, seminars, popular articles, publications, teaching materials, exhibits and academic studies. Piast Institute also aids in the management of the Dekaban Foundations, which sponsor university faculty exchanges in economics, engineering and agriculture between Polish universities and institutions in the United States, Canada and Western Europe. In addition to the oversight of these programs, Piast Institute also sponsors and organizes annual Dekaban Lectures that have featured, among other speakers, former U.S. National Security Advisor Zbigniew Brzezinski and Pulitzer Prize winning author Alex Storozynski.

Piast is also certified by the United States Department of Citizenship and Immigration as an official assistance site for immigration matters, and arranges social services for local immigrants of all ethnicities. In addition to helping immigrant families, Piast Institute works to mediate social and political conflicts among ethnic groups, including taking leadership in mediating a highly publicized national story covered by The New York Times, among others, regarding the Muslim community's airing of Calls to Prayer over loudspeakers in Detroit. In addition to working with America's Islamic community, Piast also works to reinforce cultural ties between the Polish-American community and those of African Americans, Hispanic-Americans and Jewish-Americans.

Piast also takes a lead role in protecting Polish culture from defamation and ensuring healthy dialogue between groups of all cultures. In 2006, it promoted serious discussion of the book FEAR: Anti-Semitism in Poland After Auschwitz by sociologist Jan T. Gross, sponsoring an online international scholarly symposium (www.AnalysisofFEAR.org) on the highly debated charges made by the author. Piast was also a strong voice speaking against the common mischaracterization of Nazi concentration camps built on Polish soil as "Polish Death Camps," aiding in an effort that culminated with the United Nations renaming the "Auschwitz-Birkenau Concentration Camp" to the "Former Nazi German Concentration Camp Auschwitz-Birkenau."

== Other involvements ==
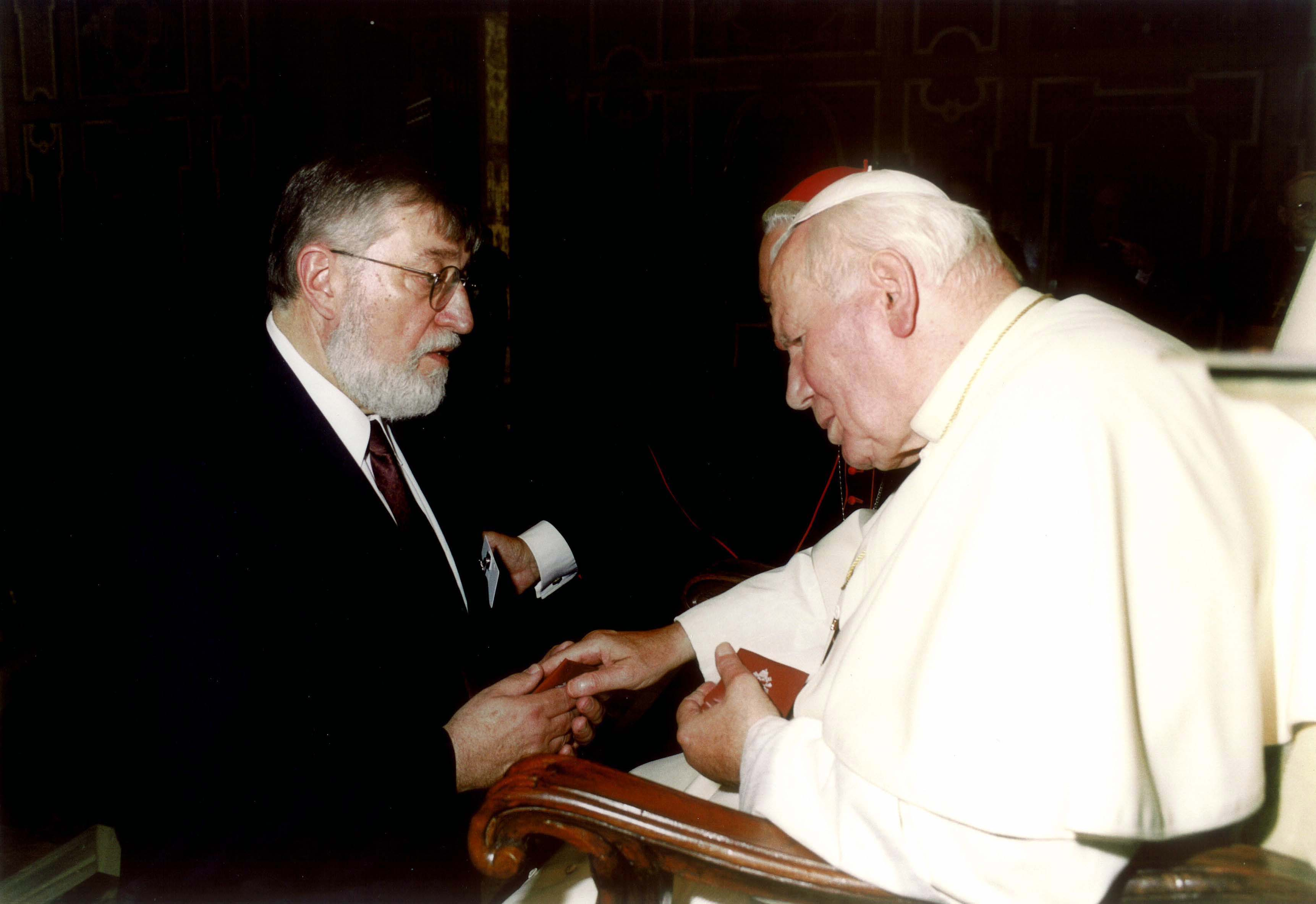
Thaddeus Radzilowski meets with Pope John Paul II at the Vatican

- Ford Foundation Commission on Ethnicity in American Life
- Kosciuszko Foundation
- My Polish Story feature film (consultant, narrator)
- National Polish-American Jewish-American Council (Co-chairman)
- Polish American Historical Association (Past President)
- Polish National Alliance
- Polish National Congress (Michigan Director)
- Polish Roman Catholic Union of America
- Saint Mary's College, Orchard Lake (President Emeritus)
- The Polish Review (Editorial Board)
- University of Michigan (Professor)
- Upper Midwest Ethnic Studies Association (Past President)
- National Polish Apostolate Committee

== Early career ==
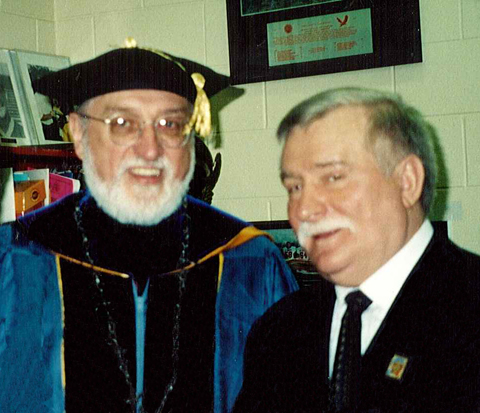
Radzilowski with former Solidarity leader and Polish President Lech Wałęsa

Prior to co-founding the Piast Institute, Radzilowski taught at University of Michigan–Dearborn, Madonna University, Heidelberg College, and Southwest Minnesota State University where he served as chair of the Department of History, director of the Regional History Center, director of Rural Studies and associate vice president for academic affairs. He also served as the acting director of the Immigration Research Center of the University of Minnesota, co-directed a special program on International Business at the Wirtschaft Universitet in Vienna and chaired the International Conference on Migration at the Jagiellonian University in Kraków.

Radzilowski has also served as an advisor and consultant to the U.S. Commission on Civil Rights and the U.S. Bureau of the Census. He was the National Endowment for the Humanities’ liaison to Ethnic and Community groups in the United States, a consultant for the New Jersey Department of Education and numerous other local and state government boards on ethnicity and pluralism. He has also written, produced, and consulted and advised on a number of radio and television productions, including award-winning films created in conjunction with organizations such as PBS and the Arts & Entertainment channel. Radzilowski received his Ph.D. in history from the University of Michigan.
