= Donald E. Pienkos =

Polish-American historian (born 1944)

Donald Edward Pienkos (born 1944) is a Polish-American historian at the University of Wisconsin-Milwaukee specializing in the history of Polish-American community.

He received the Officer's Cross of Merit from the President of Poland, November 2010.

His works on Milwaukee's Polonia have been described as "most useful".

== Works ==
- Pienkos, Donald E. (1965). Communist Policy in Polish Agriculture: 1944-1964. University of Wisconsin--Madison.
- Pienkos, Donald E. (1984). PNA: A Centennial History of the Polish National Alliance of the United States of North America. East European Monographs. ISBN 978-0-88033-060-2.
- Pienkos, Donald E. (1987). One Hundred Years Young: A History of the Polish Falcons of America, 1887-1987. East European Monographs. ISBN 978-0-88033-128-9.
- Pienkos, Donald E. (1991). For Your Freedom Through Ours: Polish American Efforts on Poland's Behalf, 1863-1991. East European Monographs. ISBN 978-0-88033-208-8.
- Pienkos, Donald E. (1993). Polish Americans and Poland: A Review of the Record. Polish Studies Program, Central Connecticut State University.
- Pienkos, Angela T.; Pienkos, Donald E. (2003). "In the Ideals of Women is the Strength of a Nation": A History of the Polish Women's Alliance of America. East European Monographs. ISBN 978-0-88033-530-0.
- Pienkos, Donald E. (2008). Yesterday, Today, Tomorrow: The Story of the Polish National Alliance. Alliance Printers and Publishers.
