= Alexander Prusin =

American historian (1955–2018)

- Олександр Прусін
- Born: August 1, 1955; Lviv, Ukrainian SSR, Soviet Union (now Ukraine)
- Died: August 13, 2018 (aged 63); Albuquerque, New Mexico, United States
- Occupations: Historian, professor

Alexander Victor Prusin (Note: Ukrainian: Олександр Прусін, romanized: Oleksandr Prusin) (August 1, 1955 – August 13, 2018) was a professor of history at the New Mexico Institute of Mining and Technology from 2001 to 2018. He was born in born Lviv, Ukraine. He was specialized in the history of Russia and Eastern Europe, nationalism, ethnic conflict, and genocide.

== Life ==
Alexander Prusin pursued his PhD studies at the University of Toronto before joining New Mexico Institute of Mining and Technology, where he taught as associated professor for history for the past seventeen years. He taught in a multidisciplinary unit, the CLASS (Communication, Liberal Arts, and Social Sciences) Department.

== Works ==
=== Books ===
- The Lands Between: Conflict in the East European Borderlands, 1870-1992 (2010)
- Nationalizing a Borderland: War, Ethnicity, and Anti-Jewish Violence in East Galicia, 1914–1920 (2016)
- Serbia under the Swastika: A World War II Occupation (2017)
- Justice Behind the Iron Curtain: Nazis on Trial in Communist Poland (2018)

=== Articles and Book Chapters ===
- With Zeman, Scott C. (2003). "Taming Russia's Wild East: The Central Asian historical-revolutionary film as Soviet Orientalism". Historical Journal of Film, Radio and Television. 23 (3): 259–270. doi:10.1080/0143968032000095587.
- "'Fascist Criminals to the Gallows!': The Holocaust and Soviet War Crimes Trials, December 1945-February 1946". Holocaust and Genocide Studies. 17 (1): 1–30. 2003. doi:10.1093/hgs/17.1.1.
- With Finder, Gabriel (2004). "Collaboration in Eastern Galicia: The Ukrainian police and the Holocaust". East European Jewish Affairs. 34 (2). doi:10.1080/1350167052000340904.
- "A Community of Violence: The SiPo/SD and Its Role in the Nazi Terror System in Generalbezirk Kiew". Holocaust and Genocide Studies. 21 (1): 1–30. 2007. doi:10.1093/hgs/dcm001.
- "Poland's Nuremberg: The Seven Court Cases of the Supreme National Tribunal, 1946-1948". Holocaust and Genocide Studies. 24 (1): 1–25. 2010. doi:10.1093/hgs/dcq001.
- with Finder, Gabriel N. (2014). "Jewish Collaborators on Trial in Poland 1944‒1956". Polin: Studies in Polish Jewry. 20. doi:10.3828/polin.2008.20.122.
