= Anita J. Prazmowska =

Anglo-Polish historian

Anita Prazmowska
- Anita Prażmowska

Academic background
- Education: University of Birmingham

Academic work
- Discipline: History
- Sub-discipline: Polish history
- Institutions: LSE
- Notable students: Frank Turner
- Website: Publications by Anita Prazmowska at ResearchGate

Anita J. Prazmowska (also Prażmowska) is a Professor in International History at the London School of Economics (LSE), England. Her main fields of research lie in the Cold War, communism, contemporary history, Eastern Europe, fascism and Poland. She has published several books and journals. Her articles have been published in The Guardian.

As an undergraduate student Prazmowska studied at the University of Birmingham under John Grenville. In 2009 she publicly criticised David Cameron's Conservative Party for joining the European Conservatives and Reformists Group and subsequently inviting its leader Michał Kamiński to attend the Party's conference. Her biography of Władysław Gomułka was released in 2016. At LSE, she tutored musician Frank Turner while he was an undergraduate student. In 2019, she wrote a letter to The Guardian objecting to the treatment of workers employed at the British Library's cafe.

== Selected publications ==
- Władysław Gomułka: A Biography (I.B. Tauris, 2016).
- A History of Poland 2nd ed. (Palgrave Macmillan, 2011).
- Poland: A Modern History (I.B. Tauris, 2010).
- Ignacy Paderewski: Poland (Haus Publishing, 2009).
- Civil War in Poland 1942–1948 (Palgrave Macmillan, 2004).
- Eastern Europe and the Origins of the Second World War (Palgrave Macmillan, 2000).
- Britain and Poland 1939–1943: The Betrayed Ally (Cambridge University Press, 1995).
- Britain, Poland and the Eastern Front, 1939 (Cambridge University Press, 1987).
