= Piast Institute =

American-based research center

- Established: 2003
- President: Virginia L. Skrzyniarz
- Budget: Revenue: $330,112; Expenses: $261,825 (FYE December 2015)
- Address: 11633 Joseph Campau; Hamtramck, MI 48212
- Location: Hamtramck, Michigan
- Website: www.piastinstitute.org

The Piast Institute is a national research and policy center for Polish and Polish-American affairs based in Hamtramck, Michigan, in the United States, an enclave located within the city of Detroit. The institute was founded in 2003 by Dr. Thaddeus Radzilowski and Mrs. Virginia Skrzyniarz. With a board of directors composed of Polish-American leaders, an international network of Institute Fellows, and a staff led by Mrs. Skrzyniarz as president, Piast Institute has evolved into the only think tank in North America devoted to Polish and Polish-American affairs.

== Activities ==
=== Census Information Center ===
U.S. Senator Debbie Stabenow of Michigan announces the selection of Piast Institute as a CIC

In 2006, the Piast Institute was designated as a United States Census Information Center (CIC) by the United States Census Bureau. Piast Institute is only one of 59 CICs, the only Center in the Great Lakes region, and the only CIC whose primary purpose is to represent a European ethnic group.

As a CIC, the Piast Institute is part of the U.S. Census Bureau's data dissemination network. The program's focus is making census information and data available to underserved communities that may not have access to census data through other means. In addition to using the Census data for its own studies and research, the institute serves the Polish and Polish-American communities as well as organizations seeking to forward the goals of other ethnic and minority communities. The institute also provides census data and reports to businesses for a small fee.

==== Polish American surveys ====
In 2013, Piast founder Thaddeus Radzilowski and academic Dominik Stecula presented the aggregate survey of 900 Polish Americans from 2009-2013 during the 11th annual Dekaban lecture. Titled "Polonia: Today's Profile, Tomorrow's promise", the study provided the only widespread demographic data on Polish Americans from the 21st century (such as political party affiliation and voting statistics for the 2008 and 2012 presidential election), contributing enormously to the understanding and characterization of Polonia as we currently understand it. The study's questions focused on Polish America's political leanings, as well as participants' understand of their own polish identity, and priorities for the community.

7 years later in September 2020, the 2020 Polish American Study was launched by Piast Institute and Stecula with similar aims as their 2013 survey. This survey was far more detailed and varied in questions and topics explored. For example participants assigned personal favorability ratings to different political ideologies, and gave agree/disagree spectrum responses to political statements - some of which echoed the rhetoric of popular conspiracy theories. It was published in January 2022.

=== Community Involvement ===
==== Hamtramck Drug Free Community Coalition ====
The Hamtramck Drug Free Community Coalition (HDFCC) is a non-profit community coalition established in 2006 by the Piast institute in response to rising substance abuse among the city's youth. The organization is dedicated to "prevent and reduce drug and alcohol abuse by implementing prevention strategies for a uniquely diverse community". HDFCC partners with organizations such as AmeriCorps VISTA and Detroit Wayne Mental Health Association, and Michigan Profile for Healthy Youth on projects and events such as birthdate signs (denoting the year one is required to be born prior to in order to purchase substances), expired/unwanted medicine drives, mock crashes (portraying dangers of driving under the influence), anonymous question sessions for youth to ask questions about substance abuse and sexual health, and blood pressure check barbeques.

==== Dekaban Program ====
The Piast Institute assists the family of Dr. Anatole Dekaban and his wife Mrs. Pamela Liddle-Dekaban in the oversight and management of the work of the Dekaban-Liddle Foundations. The Foundations, established by Dr. and Mrs. Dekaban in 1982, facilitate agricultural, economic, and engineering exchanges between Polish universities and universities located in the United States, Canada, and the United Kingdom. The foundations seek to benefit Poland and its citizens by enhancing the quality of Polish science and education.

In addition, the Piast Institute sponsors the annual Dekaban Lecture to commemorate and honor the work and spirit of Dr. and Mrs. Dekaban. Keynote speakers participating in the Dekaban lectures have included figures such as Dr. Zbigniew Brzezinski, an influential figure in the history of U.S. foreign policy, and Alex Storozynski, a Pulitzer Prize–winning journalist.

=== Polish American Communication Initiative (PACI) ===
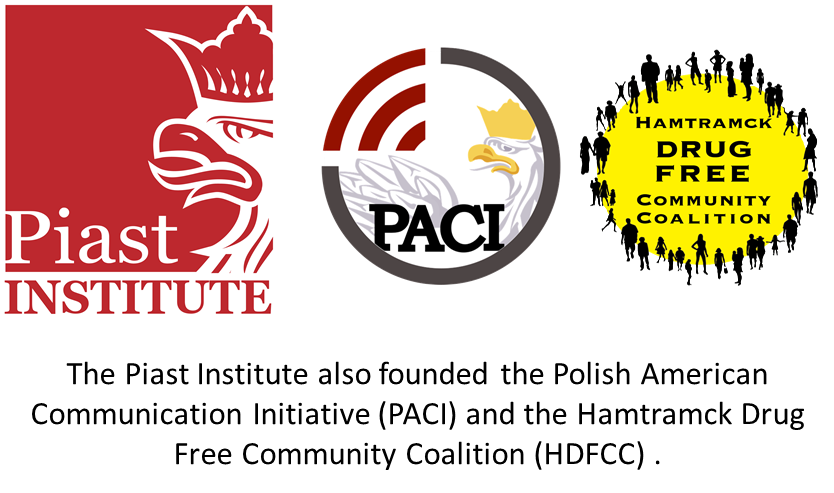

Piast Institute, with the assistance of the Congressional Quarterly (CQ) and support from the Consulate General of the Republic of Poland in Chicago, runs the Polish American Communication Initiative (PACI). It is a nonpartisan website that allows users to communicate with their elected representatives. PACI posts current issues which its Advisory board feels are important to Polish Americans with issues of interests ranging from a bill in Congress to a derogatory remark in the media. There is also a page that enables users to contact national and local newspapers or send a letter of gratitude for the positive representation of Poles and Polish Americans.
