= Jan Tomasz Gross =

Polish–American historian

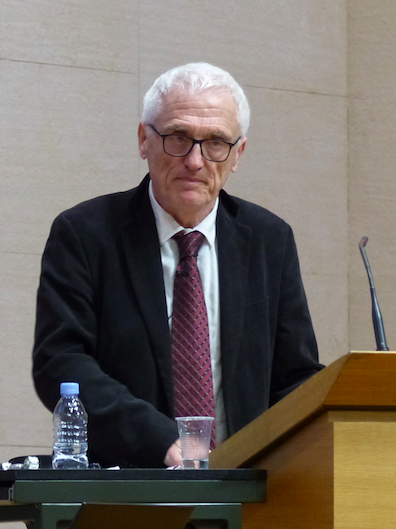
- Gross at the Collège de France in 2019
- Born: August 1, 1947 (age 79); Warsaw, Poland
- Awards: John Simon Guggenheim Memorial Fellowship (1982)

Academic background
- Education: Yale University

Academic work
- Sub-discipline: Polish-Jewish relations during World War II
- Institutions: Yale University; New York University; Princeton University

Jan Tomasz Gross (born 1947) is a Polish-American sociologist and historian. He is the Norman B. Tomlinson '16 and '48 Professor of War and Society emeritus and professor of history emeritus at Princeton University.

Gross is the author of several books on Polish history, particularly Polish-Jewish relations during World War II and the Holocaust, including Neighbors: The Destruction of the Jewish Community in Jedwabne, Poland (2001); Fear: Anti-Semitism in Poland after Auschwitz (2006); and, with Irena Grudzińska-Gross, Golden Harvest (2012).

== Early life and education ==
Gross was born in Warsaw to Hanna Szumańska, a member of the Polish resistance (Armia Krajowa) in World War II, and Zygmunt Gross, a lawyer who was a Polish Socialist Party member before the war broke out. His grandfather was a well-known Jewish liberal. His mother was Christian and his father Jewish. His mother's first husband, who was Jewish, was killed after a neighbor denounced him. She rescued several Jews during the Holocaust, including the man who became her second husband after the war.

Gross attended local schools and studied physics at the University of Warsaw. He became one of the young dissidents known as Komandosi, and was among the university students who participated in the "March events", the Polish student and intellectual protests of 1968. Like many Polish students, he was expelled from the university, and was arrested and jailed for five months.

During the Polish communist government's antisemitic campaign, Gross emigrated from Poland to the United States in 1969. In 1975 he earned a PhD in sociology from Yale University for a thesis on the Polish underground state, published as Polish Society under German Occupation (1979).

== Career ==
=== Teaching ===
Gross has taught at Yale, New York University, and in Paris. He is a naturalized U.S. citizen. He has specialized in studies of Polish history and Polish-Jewish relations in Poland. He is the Norman B. Tomlinson '16 and '48 Professor of War and Society emeritus in Princeton University's history department. Gross has held this seat since 2003. He is also a professor of history emeritus.

=== Research ===
Based on documentation of Polish citizens deported to Siberia, Gross and his wife Irena Grudzińska-Gross published In 1940, Mother, They Sent Us to Siberia. In the 1980s, Gross wrote Revolution From Abroad: Soviet Conquest of Poland’s Western Ukraine and Western Belorussia, based primarily on Hoover Archive material.

His 2001 book about the Jedwabne massacre, Neighbors: The Destruction of the Jewish Community in Jedwabne, Poland, addressed the role of local Poles in the massacre and resulted in controversy. He wrote that Poles, not German occupiers, committed the atrocity, thus revising a major part of Polish self-understanding of their history during the war. Gross's book was the subject of vigorous debate in Poland and abroad. The political scientist Norman Finkelstein accused Gross of exploiting the Holocaust. Norman Davies called Neighbors "deeply unfair to Poles".

A subsequent investigation by the Polish Institute of National Remembrance (IPN) supported some of Gross's conclusions but not his estimate of the number of people murdered. In addition, the IPN concluded there was more involvement by Nazi German security forces in the massacre. Polish journalist Anna Bikont began an investigation at the same time, ultimately publishing a book, My z Jedwabnego (2004), later published in French and English as The Crime and the Silence: Confronting the Massacre of Jews in Wartime Poland (French, 2011; English, 2015).

In 2006, Gross's book Fear: Anti-Semitism in Poland after Auschwitz, which deals with antisemitism and anti-Jewish violence in postwar Poland, was published in the U.S., where reviewers praised it. When published in Polish in Poland in 2008, it received mixed reviews and revived a nationwide debate about antisemitism in Poland during and after World War II. Marek Edelman, one of the leaders of the Warsaw Ghetto Uprising, said in an interview with the newspaper Gazeta Wyborcza, "Postwar violence against Jews in Poland was mostly not about antisemitism; murdering Jews was pure banditry."

Gross's latest book, Golden Harvest (2011), co-written with his wife, Irena Grudzińska-Gross, is about Poles enriching themselves at the expense of Jews murdered in the Holocaust. Polish critics have alleged that Gross dwells too much on wartime pathologies, drawing "unfair generalizations". The Chief Rabbi of Poland, Michael Schudrich, said: "Gross writes in a way to provoke, not to educate, and Poles don't react well to it. Because of the style, too many people reject what he has to say."

== Honors ==
On 6 September 1996, President Aleksander Kwaśniewski awarded Gross and his wife Irena Grudzińska-Gross the Order of Merit of the Republic of Poland for "outstanding achievement in scholarship".

As a professor in New York University's department of politics, Gross was a beneficiary of the Fulbright Program for research on "Social and Political History of the Polish Jewry 1944-49" at the Jewish Historical Institute in Warsaw from January to April 2001.

In 1982, Gross was awarded a fellowship in the field of sociology by the John Simon Guggenheim Memorial. Also in 1982, as an assistant professor of sociology at Yale University, he received a Rockefeller Humanities Fellowship for his project "Soviet Rule in Poland, 1939-1941".

== Controversies ==
In an essay published in 2015 in the German newspaper Die Welt, Gross wrote that during World War II, "Poles killed more Jews than Germans". In 2016, he said that "Poles killed a maximum 30,000 Germans and between 100,000 and 200,000 Jews." According to historian Jacek Leociak, "the claim that Poles killed more Jews than Germans could be really right—and this is shocking news for the traditional thinking about Polish heroism during the war." Polish Foreign Ministry spokesman Marcin Wojciechowski dismissed Gross's statement as "historically untrue, harmful and insulting to Poland".

On 15 October 2015, Polish prosecutors opened a libel inquiry against Gross under a paragraph of the criminal code that "provides that any person who publicly insults the Polish nation is punishable by up to three years in prison". Prosecutors had previously examined Gross's books Fear and Golden Harvest but closed those cases after finding no evidence of a crime. In 2016, the Simon Wiesenthal Center said the decision to continue the investigation bore "all the hallmarks of a political witch-hunt" and was a "form of alienating minorities and people who were victimized". The investigation was closed in November 2019. Prosecutors said that "there is no conclusive data on the numbers of Germans and Jews killed as a result of actions committed by Poles during the Second World War. The establishment of such numbers is still the subject of research by historians and the subject of dispute between them". One of the experts consulted was Piotr Gontarczyk, who said there is no conclusive evidence that Poles killed more Jews than Germans during the war, but such a view is impossible to disprove. According to Gontarczyk, such statements, while controversial, are within the limits of academic discourse.

On 14 January 2016, because of what he described as "an attempt to destroy Poland's good name", Polish President Andrzej Duda requested a reevaluation of the award to Gross of the Knight's Cross of the Order of Merit of the Republic of Poland. The request was met with local and international protest. Gross responded that the "PiS [Law and Justice Party] is obsessed with stimulating a patriotic sense of duty. And given that most Poles do not know their own history very well, and think that Poles suffered as much as Jews during the war, the new regime is playing into a language of Catholic martyrology." Timothy Snyder, an American historian noted for his work on European genocides, said that if the order were taken from Gross, he would renounce his own.

== Selected works ==
Books

- Gross, Jan Tomasz (1979). Polish Society Under German Occupation - Generalgouvernement, 1939–1944. Princeton, NJ: Princeton University Press.
- Grudzińska-Gross, Irena; Gross, Jan Tomasz (1981). War through Children's Eyes: The Soviet Occupation of Poland and the Deportations, 1939–1941. Stanford, CA: Hoover Institution Press.
- Gross, Jan Tomasz; Irena Grudzińska-Gross (1984). W czterdziestym nas matko na Sybir zesłali ... London: Aneks.
- Gross, Jan Tomasz (1998). Upiorna dekada, 1939–1948. Trzy eseje o stereotypach na temat Żydów, Polaków, Niemców i komunistów. Kraków: Universitas.
- Gross, Jan Tomasz (1999). Studium zniewolenia. Kraków: Universitas.
- Gross, Jan Tomasz (2000). Istvan Deak and Tony Judt (ed.). The Politics of Retribution in Europe: World War II and Its Aftermath. Princeton, NJ: Princeton University Press.
- Gross, Jan Tomasz (2001). Neighbors: The Destruction of the Jewish Community in Jedwabne, Poland. Princeton, NJ: Princeton University Press. ISBN 0-14-200240-2.
- Gross, Jan Tomasz (2002). Revolution from Abroad. The Soviet Conquest of Poland's Western Ukraine and Western Belorussia. Princeton: Princeton University Press. ISBN 0-691-09603-1.
- Gross, Jan Tomasz (2003). Wokół Sąsiadów. Polemiki i wyjaśnienia (in Polish). Sejny: Pogranicze. ISBN 83-86872-48-9.
- Gross, Jan Tomasz (2006). Fear: Anti-Semitism in Poland after Auschwitz. Random House. ISBN 0-375-50924-0.
- Gross, Jan Tomasz; Irena Grudzińska-Gross (2012). Golden Harvest. New York: Oxford University Press. ISBN 978-0-19-973167-1.

Other

- "Russian Rule in Poland, 1939-1941" (1983)
- "Lato 1941 w Jedwabnem. Przyczynek do badan nad udzialem spolecznosci lokalnych w eksterminacji narodu zydowskiego w latach II wojny swiatowej," in Non-provincial Europe, Krzysztof Jasiewicz ed., Warszawa/London: Rytm, ISP PAN, 1999, pp. 1097–1103.

== See also ==
- Anti-Jewish violence in Poland, 1944–1946
- Lucy Dawidowicz
- History of Jews in Poland
- Kielce pogrom
- Research Materials: Max Planck Society Archive
- Raul Hilberg
