= Jedwabne pogrom =

1941 massacre of Jews in Poland

- Part of World War II and the Holocaust
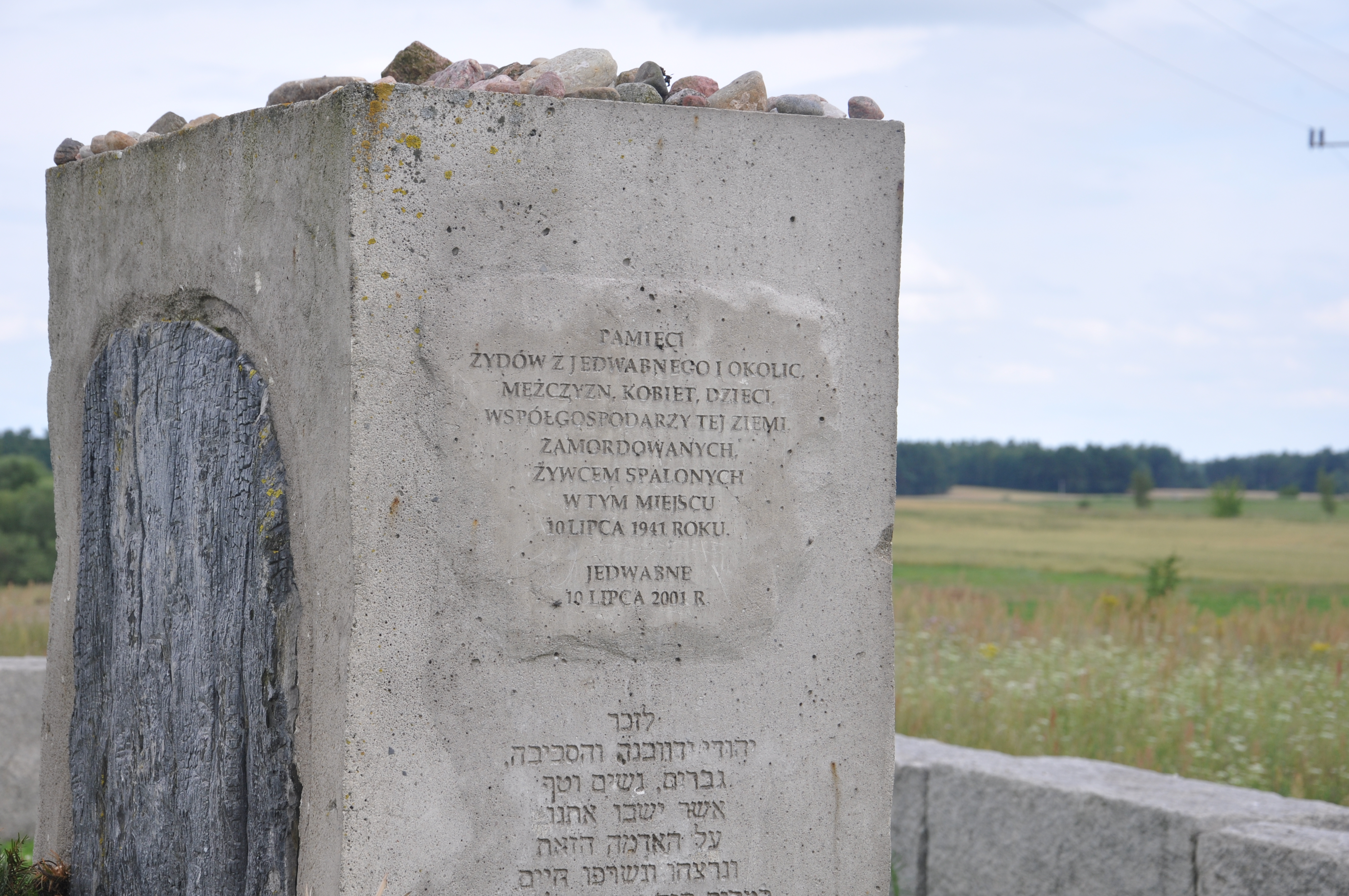
- Memorial in Jedwabne, Łomża County, Poland
- Location: 53°17′19″N 22°18′35″E; Jedwabne, German-occupied Poland
- Date: 10 July 1941
- Attack type: Pogrom/massacre
- Deaths: At least 340 Polish Jews
- Perpetrator: At least 40 ethnic Poles in cooperation with German military police
- Motive: Antisemitism, looting, retribution, German incitement
- Trials: 1949–1950 trials (Polish People's Republic)
- Inquiry: 1960–1965 investigation (West Germany); 2000–2003 Institute of National Remembrance (IPN) investigation (Republic of Poland)

The Jedwabne pogrom was a massacre of Polish Jews in the town of Jedwabne, German-occupied Poland, on 10 July 1941, during World War II and the early stages of the Holocaust. Estimates of the number of victims vary from 300 to 1,600, including women, children, and elderly, many of whom were locked in a barn and burned alive.

At least 40 ethnic Poles carried out the killing; their ringleaders decided on it beforehand with Germany's Gestapo, SS security police, or SS intelligence, and they cooperated with German military police. According to historian Jan T. Gross, "the undisputed bosses of life and death in Jedwabne were the Germans," who were "the only ones who could decide the fate of the Jews."

The first information about the Jedwabne pogrom was published in 1966 by Szymon Datner in an article published in the "JHI Bulletin" of the Jewish Historical Institute. In 1967, the Regional Commission for Research of Nazi Crimes in Białystok began another investigation in the case.

Knowledge of the massacre did not become widespread until 1999–2003. Polish filmmakers, journalists, and academics, in particular Jan Tomasz Gross's history Neighbors: The Destruction of the Jewish Community in Jedwabne, Poland (2001), raised public interest. In 2000–2003, Poland's Institute of National Remembrance conducted a forensic murder investigation; it confirmed that the direct perpetrators were ethnic Poles. The country was shocked by the findings, which challenged common narratives about the Holocaust in Poland that had focused on Polish suffering and heroism, and that non-Jewish Poles had little responsibility for the fate of Poland's Jews.

In a 2001 memorial ceremony at Jedwabne, President Aleksander Kwaśniewski apologized on behalf of the country, an apology that was repeated in 2011 by President Bronisław Komorowski. With the Law and Justice (PiS) party's rise to political power in 2015, the subject again became contentious. The PiS has a controversial "history policy"; President Andrzej Duda publicly criticized Komorowski's apology.

== Background ==
=== Jedwabne ===
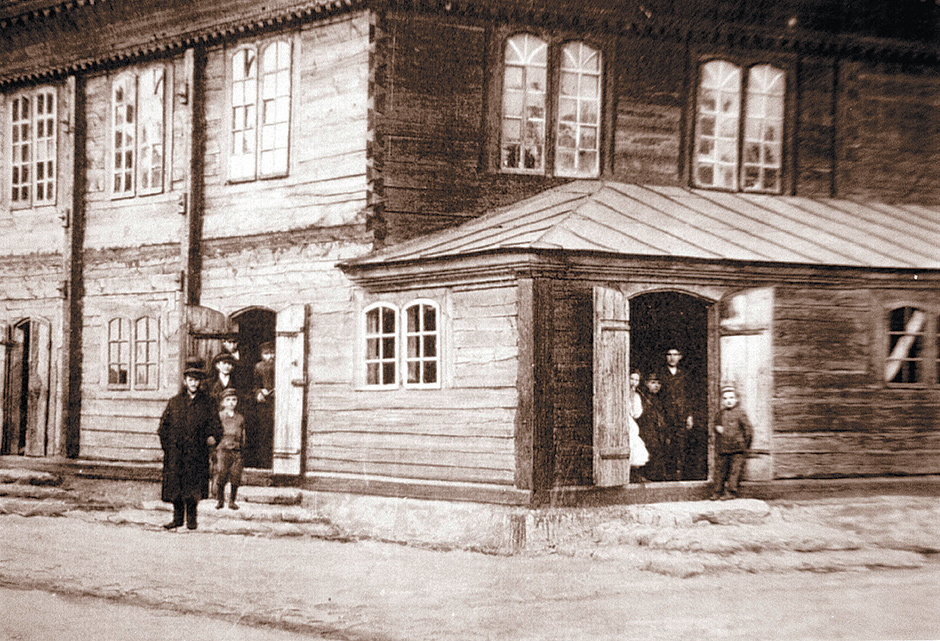
The Jedwabne Synagogue accidentally burned down in 1913.

The Jewish community in Jedwabne was established in the 17th or 18th century. In 1937, 60 percent of the population were ethnic Poles and 40 percent Jewish. In 1939, the total population was around 2,720 to 2,800. At the time, about 10 percent of Poland's population of 35 million was Jewish; it was the largest Jewish population in the world.

Many in the region supported the National Party branch of the National Democracy movement, a right-wing and antisemitic bloc which sought to counter what it claimed was Jewish economic competition against Catholics and opposed the Polish socialist government of Józef Piłsudski and his successors. Prewar Polish-Jewish relations in the town were relatively good before 1939. At their most tense, when a Jewish woman was killed in Jedwabne and a Polish peasant in another town was killed a few days later, a rumor began that the Jedwabne Jews had taken revenge. Jews anticipated a pogrom, but the local priest and rabbi stepped in and addressed the matter together.

According to Polish journalist Anna Bikont, residents of Jedwabne knew of the 1933 Radziłów pogrom in nearby Radziłów, organized by National Democracy's far-right Camp of Great Poland (OWP) faction. The organization referred to the violence as a "revolution" against the Polish state, which it saw as a protector of Jews. One Jew was killed by the pogromists, and four pogromists were killed by the Polish police; the OWP was then banned by Poland's government for anti-state and racist activities. Archival documents show Poland's government at this time was hostile to the Polish nationalist movement, because of the latter's attacks on Jews as well as its opposition to the Polish state; the government felt responsible for Jews and tried to protect them – arresting violent nationalists – and perceived Jews as trying to show loyalty to the Polish state.

=== World War II ===
World War II in Europe began on 1 September 1939 with the invasion of Poland by Nazi Germany. Later that month, the Soviet Red Army invaded the eastern regions of Poland under the Molotov–Ribbentrop Pact. The Germans transferred the area around Jedwabne to the Soviets in accordance with the German–Soviet Boundary Treaty of 28 September 1939. Anna M. Cienciala writes that most of the Jews understandably welcomed the Soviets as the "lesser evil than the Germans", though the Orthodox Jewish majority rejected their ideology, and businesspersons and the assimilated Jewish intelligentsia did not trust their intentions; and soon enough the Soviets had moved against the Jewish intelligentsia, arrested leaders of the Jewish Bund, and nationalized private businesses. According to NKVD (Soviet secret police) documents about Jedwabne and the surrounding area, "few Jews were involved as agents and informers, fewer in fact than Poles", Cienciala writes. Some younger Jews did accept roles within the lower ranks of Soviet administration and militia, for "they believed in the Communist slogans of equality and social justice, while also welcoming the chance to become upwardly mobile." Nevertheless, what stuck in Poles' minds was "the image of Jews welcoming the Soviets", and the collaboration of some communist Jews with the NKVD.

Anna Bikont writes that under Soviet occupation the Poles and Jews of Jedwabne had differing experiences of the local militia, which provided the authorities with names of anti-communist and antisemitic National Party members: "Polish accounts repeated that [the militia was] made up of Jews. The Jews themselves talk about Jews who made themselves of service to the Soviets in this first period, but they emphasize that [those Jews] were the exception rather than the rule." Regardless of the extent of the collaboration, it "strengthened the widely held stereotype of Judaeo-communism promoted by right-wing parties before the war", write Jerzy Lukowski and Hubert Zawadzki. Krzysztof Persak writes that the antisemitic stereotype of Jewish Communism used by the National Party before the war conditioned the view of Jews as Soviet collaborators; the Soviet departure then triggered revenge: "Even though the Germans were in control of the situation in Jedwabne, there is no doubt that it was not hard to find dozens of willing participants of genocidal murder among the local Poles... After two years of cruel occupation, the local Poles greeted the Wehrmacht as liberators. They also felt a strong revenge reflex toward Soviet collaborators, with Jews viewed as such en bloc. The attitude to the latter was conditioned by anti-Semitism, which was widespread in the area... As a result of a combination of all those factors, German inspiration and encouragement in Jedwabne met with favorable conditions."

Following Germany's invasion of the Soviet Union on 22 June 1941, German forces again overran Jedwabne and other parts of Poland that had been occupied by the Soviets. American historian Christopher Browning writes: "Criminal orders from above and violent impulses from below created a climate of unmitigated violence.

=== Spate of pogroms ===
Shortly after the German invasion of Soviet-held Polish territory in late June 1941, Heinrich Himmler, the most powerful Nazi after Adolf Hitler, complained that pogroms had not broken out in the newly conquered Polish region where Jedwabne is located.

The complaint was responded to by Himmler's subordinate, Reinhard Heydrich, chief of the Reich Main Security Office commanding the German Security Police, or Sicherheitspolizei, which in turn controlled Germany's SS paramilitary death squads, or Einsatzgruppen. Heydrich issued orders on 29 June and 2 July 1941 applying to newly-captured Polish territory previously controlled by the Soviets. These were for German forces to support "self-cleansing actions" by local anti-Semitic activists and anti-communists against people alleged to have collaborated with the Soviet occupation — Polish communists and Jews. Instigation of massacres in the newly-conquered region were a part of the German extermination operation, and documents show a pattern of similarity between them.

Heydrich ordered: "No obstacles should be made for the efforts aimed at self-cleaning among anti-communist and anti-Jewish circles in the newly occupied territories. To the contrary, they should be instigated without leaving a trace, and if need be—intensified and directed on the right track, but in such a manner so that the local ‘self-defense circles’ could not refer to the orders or political promises made to them."

Holocaust historian Peter Longerich wrote in 2007: "Even if the murders were carried out by local people – or more precisely by a group of forty or so men, distinct from other members of the indigenous population, mostly not from the town itself but from the surrounding area – closer analysis of the crime has now demonstrated that the pogrom was engineered by a unit of the German Security Police. This was probably a commando from the Gestapo office in Zichenau that had been assigned to Einsatzgruppe B as an auxiliary troop and which had organized several pogroms in the western part of the Voivodeship of Bialystok (in which Jedwabne was located); it had recruited local Poles as auxiliary 'pogrom police' for this purpose."

After the German occupation, Polish villagers participated in pogroms against Jews in 23 localities of the Łomża and Białystok area, with varying degrees of German involvement. Generally smaller attacks took place at Bielsk Podlaski (the village of Pilki), Choroszcz, Czyżew, Goniądz, Grajewo, Jasionówka, Kleszczele, Knyszyn, Kolno, Kuźnica, Narewka, Piątnica, Radziłów, Rajgród, Sokoły, Stawiski, Suchowola, Szczuczyn, Trzcianne, Tykocin, Wasilków, Wąsosz, and Wizna. On 5 July 1941, during the Wąsosz pogrom, Polish residents knifed and beat to death about 150–250 Jews. Two days later, during the Radziłów pogrom, local Poles are reported to have murdered 800 Jews, 500 of whom were burned in a barn. The murders took place after the Gestapo had arrived in the towns.

Writing in 2011, historians Bert Hoppe and Hiltrud Glass observed that in all massacres in German-occupied territories, there are indications of the leading role of German units even where non-Germans were the murderers, such as in Jedwabne.

In the days before the Jedwabne massacre, the town's Jewish population increased as refugees arrived from nearby Radziłów and Wizna. In Wizna, the town's Polish "civil head" (wójt) had ordered the Jewish community's expulsion; 230–240 Jews fled to Jedwabne.

According to various accounts, Persak writes, the Germans had set up a Feldgendarmerie in Jedwabne, staffed by eight or eleven military police. The police reportedly set up a "collaborationist civilian town council" led by a former mayor, Marian Karolak. Karolak established a local police force, whose members included Eugeniusz Kalinowski and Jerzy Laudanski. The town council is reported to have included Eugeniusz Sliwecki, Józef Sobutka, and Józef Wasilewski. Karol Bardon, a translator for the Germans, may also have been a member.

Persak writes that the area around Łomża and western Białystok was one of the few Polish-majority areas that had, since 1939, been experiencing the cruelty of Soviet occupation. Thus, when the Germans arrived in 1941, the population saw them as liberators; together with historical antisemitism, this created conditions ripe for German incitement.

== Jedwabne pogrom (1941) ==
=== 10 July 1941 ===
There is general agreement that German secret police or intelligence officials were seen in Jedwabne on the morning of 10 July 1941, or the day before, and met with the town council. Szmuel Wasersztajn's witness statement in 1945 said that eight Gestapo men arrived on 10 July and met with the town authorities. Another witness said four or five Gestapo men arrived and "they began to talk in the town hall". "Gestapo man" was used to refer to any German in a black uniform, Persak writes. The witnesses said they believed the meeting had been held to discuss murdering the town's Jews. (Note: Krzysztof Persak (2011): "The direct perpetrators of those crimes was a sizeable group of residents of Jedwabne and neighboring villages. Those involved in the pogrom took different roles: some killed the victims with their own hands, others supervised the Jews assembled in the market square and escorted them to the execution site in the barn, while some robbed Jewish homes or simply formed a hostile crowd of onlookers. The witnesses were fairly unanimous in assigning the role of pogrom organizers to members of the temporary municipal authorities, with Mayor Karolak at the head. Probably a significant part of the massacre was performed by members of the order service subordinated to them, of which, however, we know very little. "Far less clear is the role played in Jedwabne by representatives of the German occupation authorities. Undoubtedly, they fully approved and possibly inspired the murder. According to testimony of the then-messenger at the gendarmerie post, Jerzy Laudański, before the pogrom 'four or five Gestapo men had arrived in a cab, and they began to talk in the town hall.' In colloquial Polish, a 'cab' (taksówka) denoted a motor car, and 'Gestapo man' referred to any German in a black uniform. This reference, no doubt, relates to the meeting of the temporary municipal authorities with—probably—functionaries of the German Security Police or Security Service (Sicherheitspolizei or Sicherheitsdienst), mentioned by other witnesses as well. Although accounts regarding that issue are all secondhand, their common denominator is that during that 'conference' the decision to murder the Jedwabne Jews was taken.")

According to the IPN's report, on 10 July 1941 Polish men from nearby villages began arriving in Jedwabne "with the intention of participating in the premeditated murder of the Jewish inhabitants of the town". Gross writes that a leading role in the pogrom was carried out by four men, including Jerzy Laudański and Karol Bardoń, who had earlier collaborated with the Soviet NKVD and were now trying to recast themselves as zealous collaborators with the Germans. He also writes that no "sustained organized activity" could have taken place in the town without the Germans' consent. (Note: Institute of National Remembrance (2002): "The presence of German military policemen from the police station at Jedwabne, and of other uniformed Germans (assuming they were present at the events), even if passive, was tantamount to consent to, and tolerance of, the crime against the Jewish inhabitants of the town." United States Holocaust Memorial Museum: "On July 10, 1941, Polish residents of Jedwabne, a small town located in Bialystok District of first Soviet-occupied and then German-occupied Poland, participated in the murder of hundreds of their Jewish neighbors. Although responsibility for instigating this 'pogrom' has not been fully established, scholars have documented at least a German police presence in the town at the time of the killings.")

The town's Jews were forced out of their homes and taken to the market square, where they were ordered to weed the area by pulling up grass from between the cobblestones. While doing this, they were beaten and made to dance or perform exercises by residents from Jedwabne and nearby.

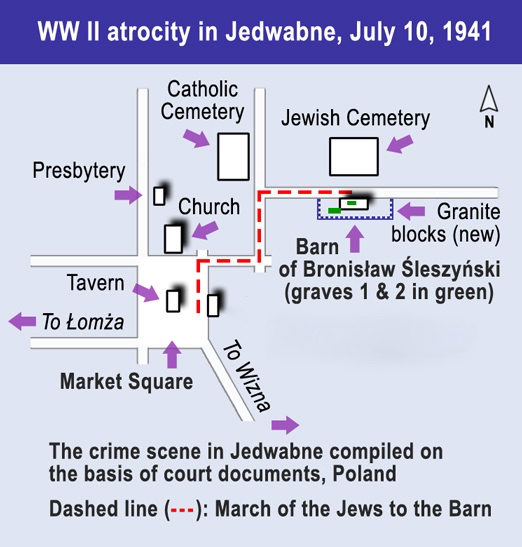
Jedwabne crime scene, compiled from Polish court documents

Evoking the antisemitic stereotype of "Żydokomuna" against their victims, who they alleged had collaborated with the Soviet regime, (Note: Doris Bergen states in this context that "Poles accused Jews of collaborating with the Soviet oppressors, but in fact it was often precisely those individuals most deeply implicated in Soviet crimes who were quickest to take the lead in attacks on Jews—attacks that would serve both to deflect the anger of their neighbors and to curry favor with the new German occupiers.") 40–50 Jewish men were forced to demolish a statue of Lenin in a nearby square and carry part of the statue on a wooden stretcher to the market square then to a nearby barn, while singing communist songs. The local rabbi, Awigdor Białostocki, and the kosher butcher, Mendel Nornberg, led the procession. According to an eyewitness, Szmuel Wasersztajn, the group was taken to the barn, where they were made to dig a pit and throw the statue in. They were then killed and buried in the same pit. Polish government investigators found this grave during a partial exhumation in 2001. It held the remains of about 40 men, a kosher butcher's knife, and the head of the concrete Lenin statue.

Most of Jedwabne's remaining Jews, around 300 men, women, children and infants, were then locked inside the barn, which was set on fire, probably using kerosene from former Soviet supplies. This group was buried in the barn near the first group. The 2001 exhumation found a mass grave within the barn's foundations and another close to the foundations.

Several witnesses reported seeing German photographers take pictures of the massacre. There was also speculation that the pogrom was filmed.

=== Survivors ===
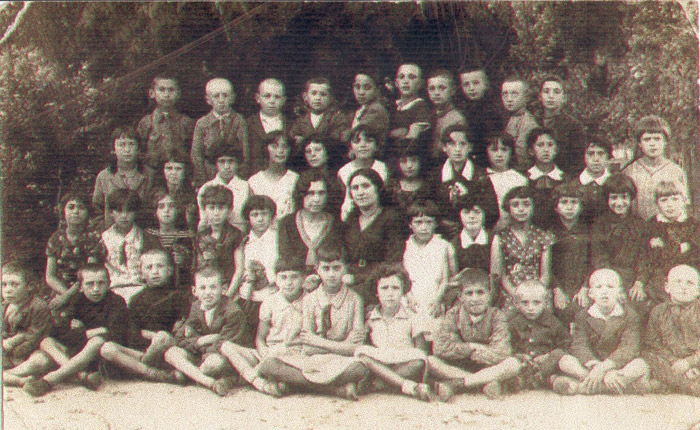
Jewish children with their schoolteachers, Jedwabne, 1933, including three boys who survived the war by hiding on Antonina Wyrzykowska's farm. Back row, second left: Szmul Wasersztajn (who gave a statement in 1945); third, Mosze Olszewicz; and fourth, Jankiel Kubrzański.

The IPN found that some Jews had been alerted by non-Jewish acquaintances the evening before that "a collective action was being prepared against the Jews". Between 100 and 125 Jews who escaped the pogrom lived in an open ghetto in Jedwabne before being transferred to the Łomża ghetto in November 1942. Several escaped to other towns. In November 1942, when the Germans began putting ghetto inmates on trains to the Auschwitz concentration camp for extermination, seven of them—Moshe Olszewicz, his wife, Lea, and his brother, Dov; Lea and Jacob Kubran; Józef Grądowski; and Szmuel Wasersztajn—escaped again to the nearby hamlet of Janczewko. There they were hidden by Antonina Wyrzykowska and Aleksander Wyrzykowski, on the couple's farm, from November 1942 to January 1945. Despite a very "aggressive attitude from Polish neighbours" and inspections by German personnel, the Wyrzykowskis managed to hide the group until the Red Army liberated Janczewko from the German occupiers in January 1945. Shortly after, the Wyrzykowskis were beaten by a group of Polish nationalists for having helped Jews; the couple had to leave the area and eventually moved to Milanówek, near Warsaw.

== Early criminal investigations, 1949–1965 ==
=== 1949–1950 trials ===
After the war, in 1949 and 1950, 22 suspects from the town and vicinity were put on trial in Poland, accused of collaborating with the Germans during the pogrom. None of the defendants had a higher education and three were illiterate. Twelve were convicted of treason against Poland and one was condemned to death. Some of the men confessed after being tortured during interviews with the Security Office (UB). The confessions were retracted in court and the accused were released. (Note: "Osobnym problemem są mieszkańcy miasteczka wymieniani podczas zeznań składanych na ręce funkcjonariuszy Urzędu Bezpieczeństwa. A to z tego powodu, że zeznania te, właśnie w tym punkcie, były gremialnie odwoływane na sali sądowej jako wymuszone torturami." English: "A separate problem concerns the townsmen who had been named during the interrogations conducted by the Security Office functionaries. That is because, on this point, the statements were all retracted in court as having been obtained through torture.")

=== German investigation, 1960–1965 ===
SS-Hauptsturmführer Wolfgang Birkner was investigated by prosecutors in West Germany in 1960 on suspicion of involvement in the massacres of Jews in Jedwabne, Radziłów, and Wąsosz in 1941. The charges were based on research by Szymon Datner, head of the Białystok branch of the Central Committee of Polish Jews (CŻKH). The German prosecutors found no hard evidence implicating Birkner, but in the course of their investigation they discovered a new German witness, the former SS Kreiskommissar of Łomża, who named the paramilitary Einsatzgruppe B under SS-Obersturmführer Hermann Schaper as having been deployed in the area at the time of the pogroms. The methods used by Schaper's death squad in the Radziłów massacre were identical to those employed in Jedwabne only three days later. During the German investigation at Ludwigsburg in 1964, Schaper lied to interrogators, claiming that in 1941 he had been a truck driver. Legal proceedings against the accused were terminated on 2 September 1965.

=== Aftermath ===
In 1963 a monument to the victims was placed in Jedwabne by the Polish communist state's Society of Fighters for Freedom and Democracy. Its inscription blamed the Germans: "The place of destruction of the Jewish population. Here Gestapo and Nazi gendarmes burned alive 1600 people on 10 July 1941."

According to Ewa Wolentarska-Ochman, "although almost absent from Poland's official historical record, the massacre remained very much alive in local oral tradition and among Jewish survivors from the region."

== Jan T. Gross's Neighbors, 2000 ==
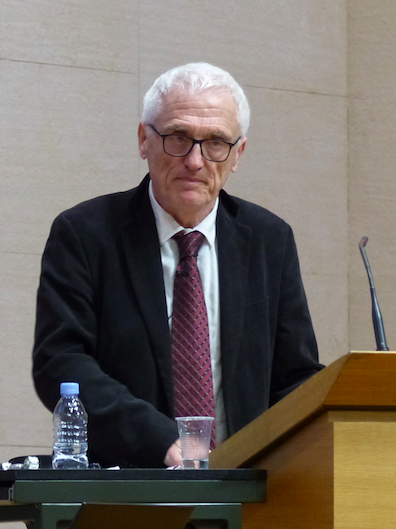
Jan T. Gross, 2019

Jan T. Gross's book Sąsiedzi: Historia zagłady żydowskiego miasteczka ("Neighbors: The Story of the Annihilation of a Jewish Town") caused a "moral earthquake" when it was published in Poland in May 2000, according to Piotr Wróbel. (Note: In December 1966 Szymon Datner wrote an article for the Bulletin of Jewish Historical Institute concluding that the Germans had moved through the area causing popular outbursts against the Jews without taking part in the killing themselves.) It appeared in English, German and Hebrew within the year. In English it was published in April 2001 by Princeton University Press as Neighbors: The Destruction of the Jewish Community in Jedwabne, Poland.

Writing that "one day, in July 1941, half of the population of a small East European town murdered the other half—some 1,600 men, women and children", Gross concluded that the Jedwabne Jews had been rounded up and killed by a mob of their own Polish neighbors. This ran contrary to Poland's official account that they had been killed by Germans. Political scientist Michael Shafir writes that the pogrom had been "subjected to confinement in the Communist 'black hole of history'". While Gross recognized that no "sustained organizing activity" could have taken place without the Germans' consent, he concluded that the massacre had been carried out entirely by Poles from Jedwabne and the surrounding area, and that the Germans had not coerced them.

Gross's sources were Szmuel Wasersztajn's 1945 witness statement from the Jewish Historical Institute; witness statements and other trial records from the 1949–1950 trials; the Yedwabne: History and Memorial Book (1980), written by Jedwabne residents who had moved to the United States; and interviews from the 1990s conducted by Gross and a filmmaker. While several Polish historians praised Gross for having drawn attention to the pogrom, others criticized him for relying too heavily on witness accounts, which they argued were not reliable, and—where conflicting accounts existed—for choosing those that showed the Poles in the worst possible light. He was also criticized for having failed to examine the pogrom within the context of German actions during the early stages of the Holocaust. According to Dan Stone, "some historians sought to dispute the fundamentals of Gross's findings by massive attention to minute details, burying the wider picture under a pile of supposed inaccuracies".

According to Ewa Wolentarska-Ochman, the publication of Neighbors "[left] young generations... unable to comprehend how such a crime could be generally unknown and never spoken about in the last 50 years."

== Polish government investigation, 2000–2003 ==
=== Exhumation ===
In July 2000, following the publication of Gross's book, the Polish parliament ordered a new investigation to be conducted by the Institute of National Remembrance –Commission for the Prosecution of Crimes against the Polish Nation (Instytut Pamięci Narodowej –Komisja Ścigania Zbrodni przeciwko Narodowi Polskiemu, or IPN).

In May–June 2001 the IPN conducted an exhumation at the site of the barn. Charred bodies were found in two mass graves, and broken pieces of the bust of Lenin. According to Dariusz Stola, "experts agree that there are no more than 400–450 bodies. This figure is compatible with the size of the barn that constituted the killing site (19 × 7 meters, or 62 × 23 feet)." The exhumation lasted just five days because of religious objections from Orthodox Jews; in Digging for the Disappeared (2015), Adam Rosenblatt writes that, because of this, what happened in Jedwabne "is likely to remain forever murky". According to William Haglund, a forensic expert for Physicians for Human Rights, who attended the exhumation as an international observer, the process should have lasted several months. In his view, the number of bodies could not be estimated in the short space of time. (Note: Physicians for Human Rights asked Rabbi Joseph Polak of Boston University for a theological opinion; he argued that reburying someone after an inappropriate burial is "not only appropriate but obligatory".)

The Polish government had to compromise and agree that only the top layer and small fragments would be examined; large pieces of bone would not be moved. The exhumation reportedly ended, according to Haglund, "with some of the non-Jewish Polish investigators weeping in frustration as they watched one of the rabbis lowering the charred teeth and bone fragments ... back into the graves".

=== Interviews ===
Over the course of two years, IPN investigators interviewed some 111 witnesses, mainly from Poland, but also from Israel and the United States. One-third of the IPN witnesses had been eyewitnesses of some part of the pogrom; most had been children at the time. The IPN also searched for documents in Polish archives in Warsaw, Białystok and Łomża, in German archives, and at Yad Vashem in Israel. During a visit to New York in January 2001, Leon Kieres, President of the IPN, said the IPN had found enough evidence to confirm that a group of Poles had been the perpetrators. In June 2001, the IPN said ammunition shells recovered from the site were German, prompting speculation that German soldiers had fired at Jews fleeing the barn, but the IPN later found that the shells were from a different historical period.

=== Findings ===
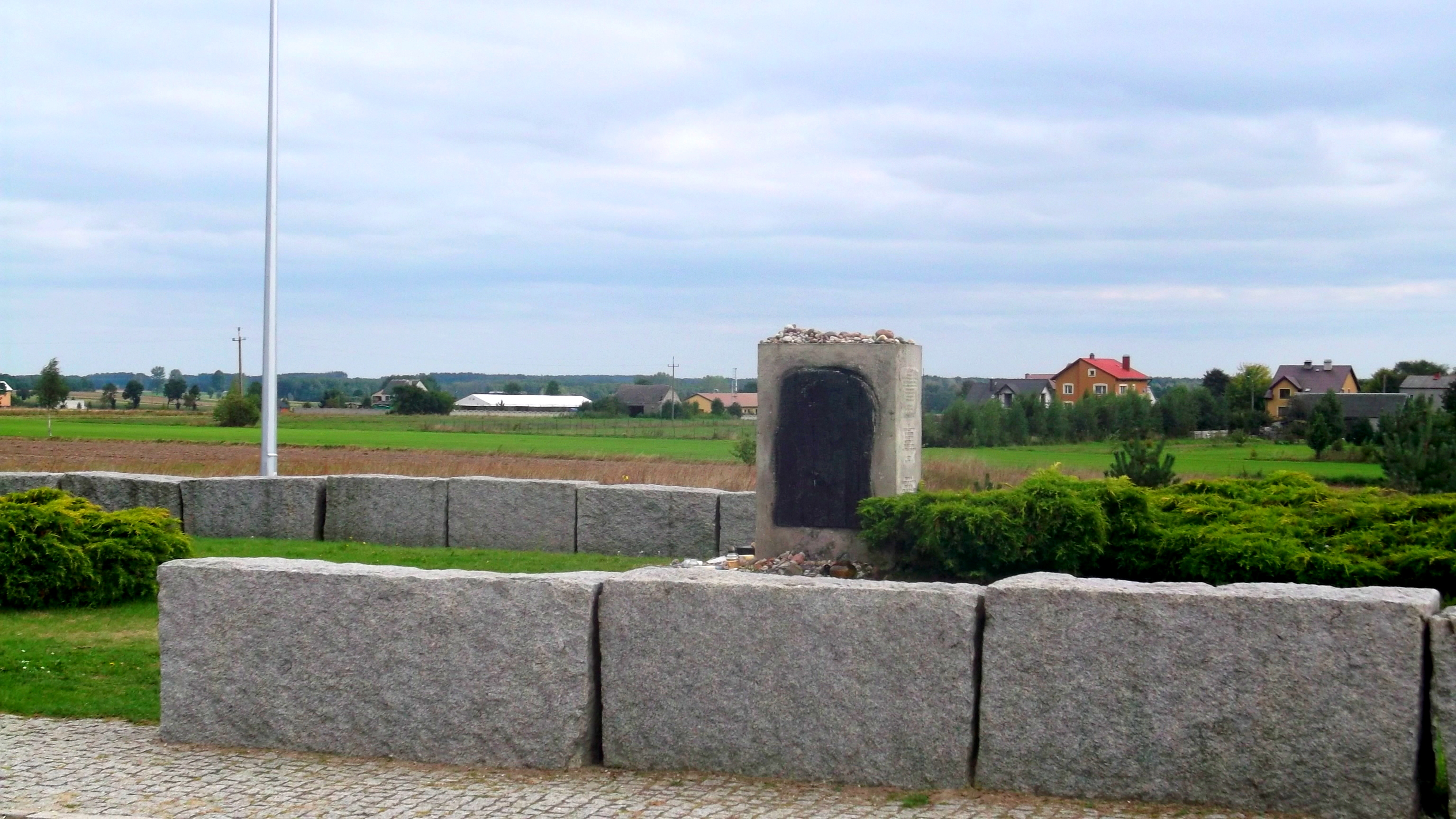
Jedwabne memorial, 2011

On 9 July 2002 the IPN issued a press release on the findings of its two-year investigation, signed by the chief prosecutor, Radosław J. Ignatiew. The IPN found that at least 340 Jews had been killed in the pogrom, in two groups. The first group consisted of 40 to 50 men, who were murdered before the barn was set on fire. The second group consisted of about 300 people of "both sexes of various ages, including children and infants". The second group was "led into a wooden, thatched barn owned by Bronisław Śleszyński. After the building had been closed, it was doused, probably with kerosene from the former Soviet warehouse." The exact number of victims could not be determined. The previously estimated figure of 1,600 "seems highly unlikely, and was not confirmed in the course of the investigation".

The report concluded that the perpetrators of the crime sensu stricto ("in the strict sense") were at least 40 male "Polish inhabitants of Jedwabne and its environs". Responsibility for the crime sensu largo ("in the broad sense") could be ascribed to the Germans because of the presence of German military policemen at the Jedwabne police station. Their presence, "though passive, was tantamount to consent to and tolerance of the crime against the Jewish inhabitants of the town".

Several witnesses had testified that uniformed Germans had arrived in the town that day and drove the group of Jews to the market place. IPN could neither conclusively prove nor disprove these accounts. "Witness testimonies vary considerably" on the question of whether the Germans took the Jews to the barn or were present there. The IPN found that the "Polish population" had played a "decisive role in the execution of the criminal plan". The IPN wrote: "On the basis of the evidence gathered in the investigation, it is not possible to determine the reasons for the passive behavior of the majority of the town's population in the face of the crime. In particular, it cannot be determined whether this passivity resulted from acceptance of the crime or from intimidation caused by the brutality of the perpetrators' acts."

Leon Kieres delivered the IPN report to the Polish parliament. A small opposition party, the League of Polish Families (LPR) called him a "servant of the Jews" and blamed him and President Aleksander Kwaśniewski for "stoning the Polish nation". LPR MP Antoni Macierewicz made an official complaint against the IPN's conclusion that ethnic Poles and not the Germans had committed the massacre. A 203-page expanded version of the findings was issued by the IPN on 30 June 2003; pages 60–160 contained summaries of the testimonies of witnesses interviewed by the IPN. The report was supplemented by two volumes of studies and documents, Wokół Jedwabnego (Vol. 1: Studies, 525 pages, and Vol. 2: Documents, 1,034 pages. On 30 June 2003 Ignatiew announced that the investigation of "the mass murder of at least 340 Polish citizens of Jewish nationality in Jedwabne on July 10, 1941" had found no living suspects who had not already been brought to justice, and therefore the IPN investigation was closed.

=== 2019 IPN statement ===
Jaroslaw Szarek, director of Poland's Institute of National Remembrance (IPN), said in February 2019 that the IPN was ready to re-open the investigation and exhume the remaining bodies, but the National Prosecutor's Office decided in March that there were no grounds for doing so.

== Legacy ==
=== Recognizing the Wyrzykowskis ===
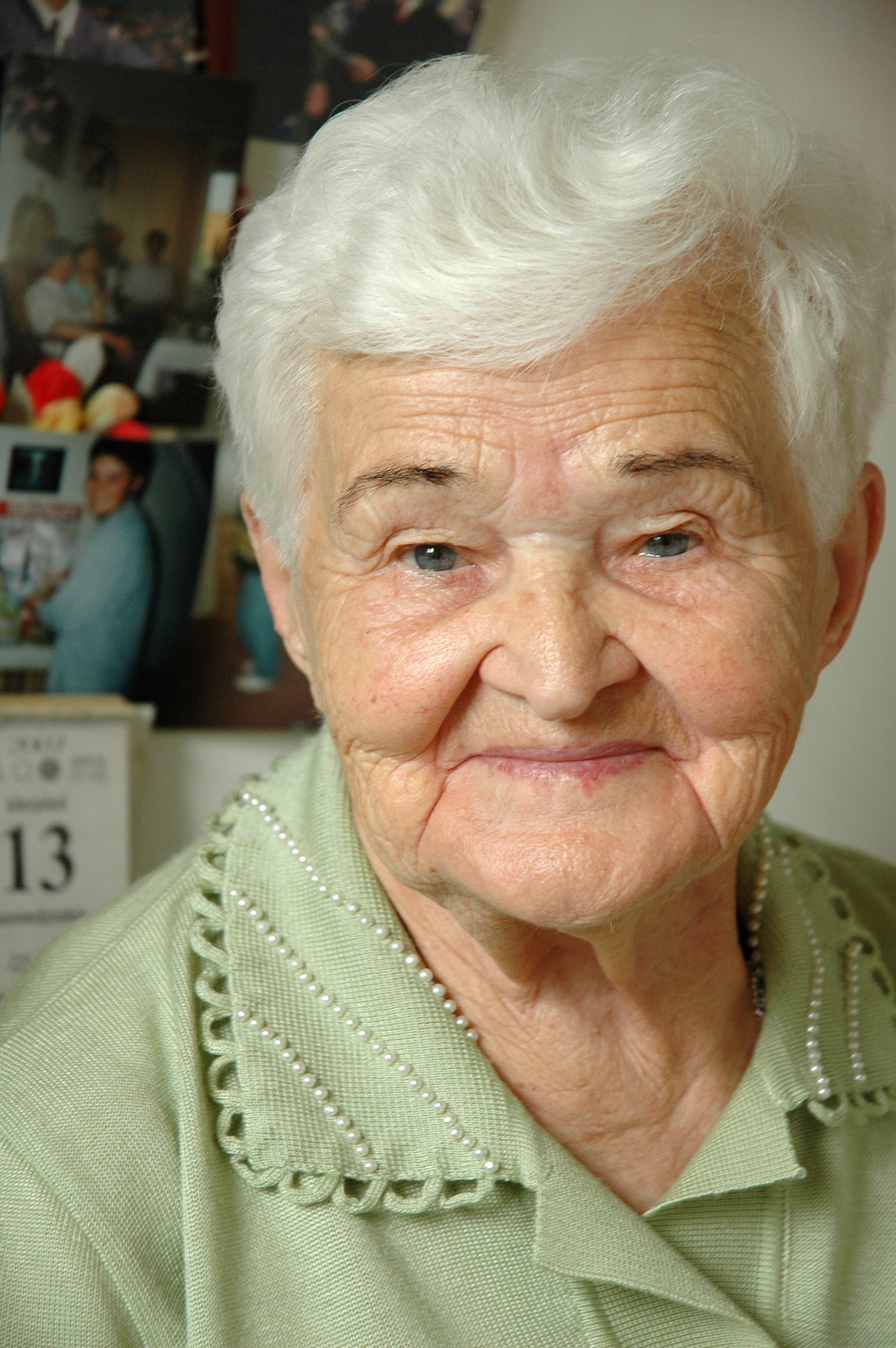
Antonina Wyrzykowska and her husband were beaten by fellow Poles for saving Jews in Jedwabne, and were later recognized as Righteous Among the Nations.

In January 1976 Antonina Wyrzykowska and Aleksander Wyrzykowski were recognized as Righteous Among the Nations medal by the Israeli Yad Vashem institution.

=== President's apology ===
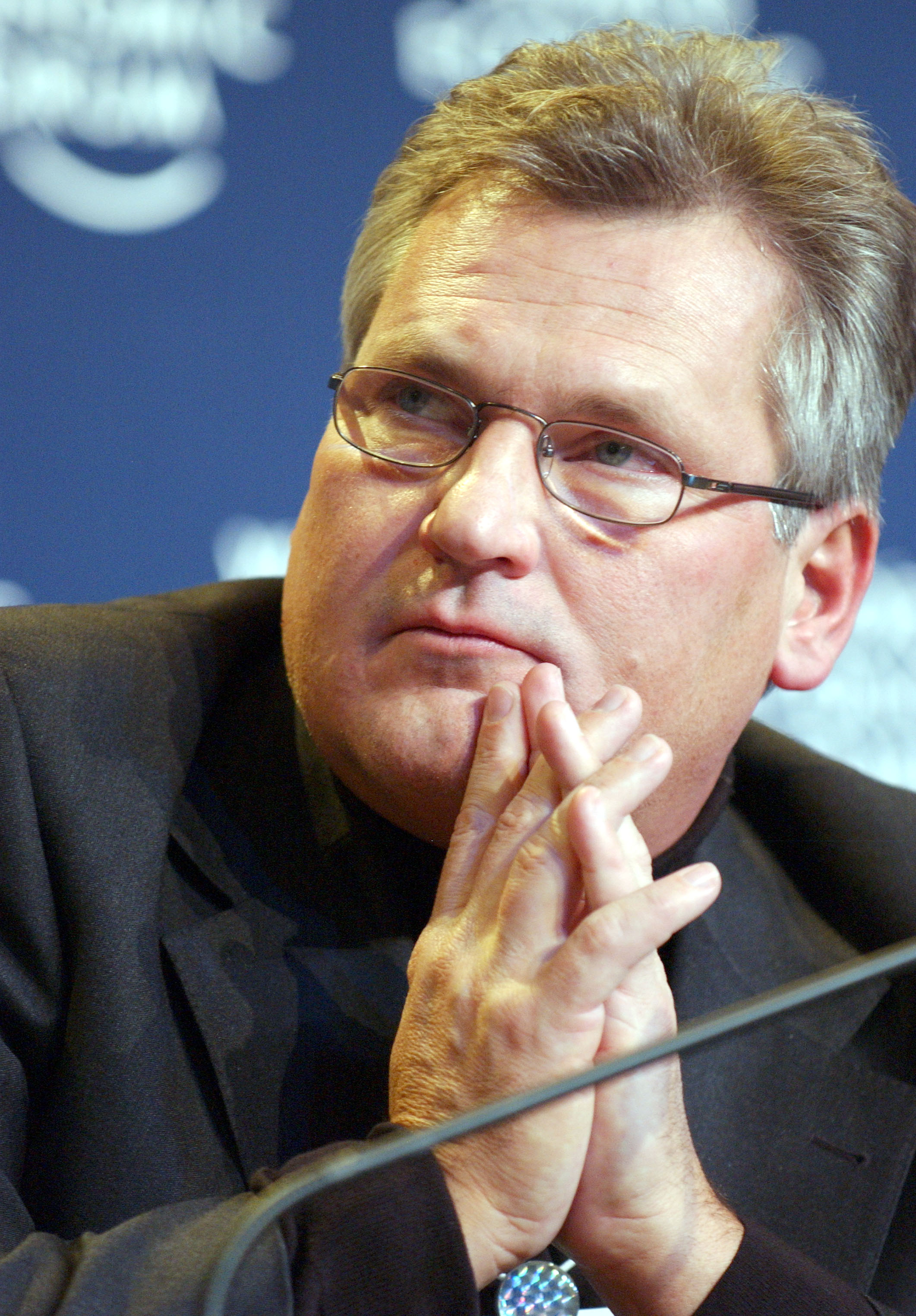
Polish president Aleksander Kwaśniewski apologized for the massacre in 2001.

In July 2001, on the 60th anniversary of the pogrom, Polish president Aleksander Kwaśniewski attended a ceremony at Jedwabne where he apologized for the massacre: "We can have no doubt that here in Jedwabne Polish citizens were killed at the hands of fellow citizens ... I apologise in my own name, and in the name of those Poles whose conscience is shattered by that crime." The ceremony was attended by Catholic and Jewish religious leaders and survivors of the pogrom. Most of the 2,000 locals of Jedwabne, including the town's priest, boycotted the ceremony in protest against the apology.

Shevah Weiss, Israeli Ambassador to Poland, also delivered a speech. "Living among us also are Holocaust survivors whose lives were saved as a result of the brave actions of their Polish neighbors," he said. He praised Poland's investigation. Former Polish president Lech Wałęsa said at the time: "The Jedwabne crime was a revenge for the cooperation of the Jewish community with the Soviet occupant. The Poles have already apologized many times to the Jews; we are waiting for the apology from the other side because many Jews were scoundrels."

=== New monument ===
The Jedwabne monument was replaced in July 2001 by a six-foot-tall stone with an inscription, in Hebrew, Polish, and Yiddish, that makes no mention of the perpetrators: "To the Memory of Jews from Jedwabne and the Surrounding Area, Men, Women, and Children, Co-inhabitants of this Land, Who Were Murdered and Burned Alive on This Spot on July 10, 1941." The memorial stone is surrounded by a series of stone blocks that mark the site of the barn. In August 2001 Jedwabne mayor Krzysztof Godlewski, a pioneer for the commemoration of the massacre, resigned in protest at the local council's refusal to fund a new road to the site. He received the Jan Karski Award in 2002, along with Rabbi Jacob Baker, author of Yedwabne: History and Memorial Book (1980).

=== Asking for forgiveness ===
On 11 July 2011 Poland's President Bronisław Komorowski asked for forgiveness at a ceremony marking the 70th anniversary. In September that year, the Jedwabne memorial was defaced with swastikas and graffiti. Poland launched an anti-hate crime investigation.

=== Influence on political discourse ===
In Poland's 2015 presidential election campaign debate, the future president, Andrzej Duda, criticized his rival, then-president Bronisław Komorowski, for "failure to defend Poland's reputation" and for apologizing for the massacre of Jews by Poles at the Jedwabne pogrom.

Writing on Poland's ruling party and its historical policy, Joanna Michlic explains that "according to the politicians, historians, and journalists representing PiS's ideological position, Jedwabne and other events that cast a negative light on Polish national identity must be revisited and retold for both Poles and the West. In their eyes, Jedwabne is a key sign of 'all the lies voiced against the Polish nation,' and is understood as the 'central attack' on Polishness, Polish values and traditions, and Polish identity (understood in an ethnic sense)."

Jörg Hackmann states that "three major explanations of the murders of Jedwabne prevail: First, that responsibility has to be seen within the Polish society... Second, [rejection of a] connection between the murders and a general Polish antisemitism [and insistence on] the image of the Pole being an "innocent and noble victim of foreign violence and intrigue" by Hitler and Stalin alike. And third, ... [a] the thesis of ascribing the responsibility solely to the Germans, which in 2016 was repeated by the current director of IPN, Jarosław Szarek..." Hackmann emphasizes the "symbolic meaning of Jedwabne for the Polish debate on World War II", quoting Joanna Michlic: "Jedwabne on the one hand, "has become the key symbol of the counter-memory of the old, hegemonic, biased narratives of the Holocaust"... On the other hand, Jedwabne has been regarded by the critics of Jan Gross as embodiment of "'all the lies voiced against the Polish nation,' and is understood as the 'central attack' on Polishness, Polish values and traditions, and Polish identity."" He summarizes that "in this context, Jedwabne has been repeatedly addressed as [a] core feature of a "pedagogy of disgrace" (pedagogika wstydu)."

== Media ==
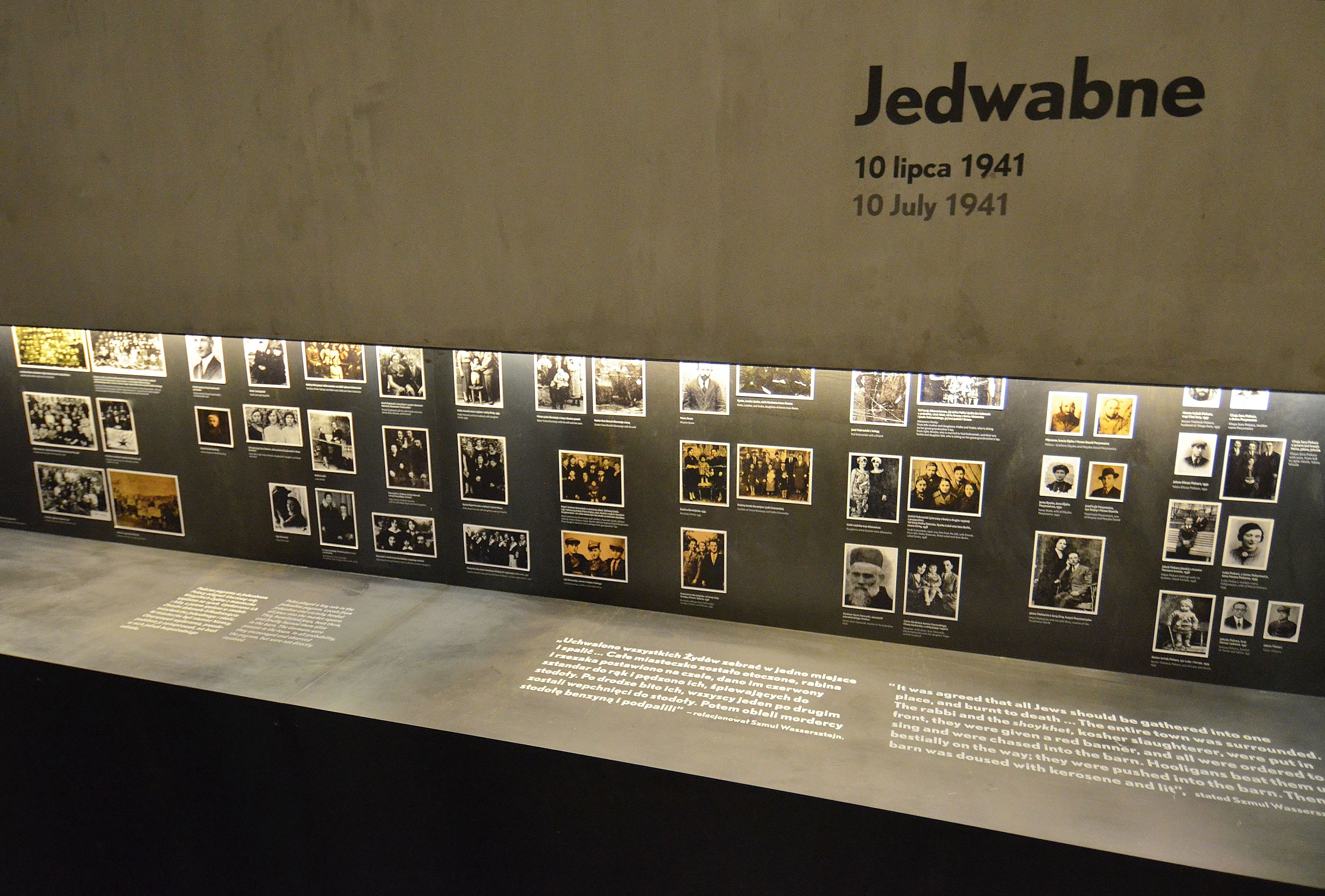
POLIN Museum of the History of Polish Jews, Warsaw, 2014

Polish film-maker Agnieszka Arnold made two documentary films interviewing witnesses of the massacre. Gdzie mój starszy syn Kain ("Where is my elder son Cain", 1999), includes interviews with Szmul Wasersztajn and the daughter of the owner of the barn where the massacre took place. The second, Sąsiedzi ("Neighbors", 2001), deals with the subject in greater depth. Gross's book of the same name was written with Arnold's permission to use the title. Gross appears in Haim Hecht's documentary Two Barns (2014), along other prominent Holocaust historians (Yehuda Bauer, Jan Grabowski, and Havi Dreifuss), as well as Wislawa Szymborska and Shevah Weiss.

=== Wokół Jedwabnego (2002) ===
Wokół Jedwabnego ("On Jedwabne") is an official two-volume Institute of National Remembrance (IPN) publication, edited by Paweł Machcewicz and Krzysztof Persak. Volume 1, Studies (525 pages) contains historical and legal research by IPN historians. Volume 2, Documents (1,034 pages), contains original documents collected by the IPN investigation.

=== The Neighbors Respond (2003) ===
An extensive collection of articles from the Polish and international debate, in English translation, was published in 2003 as The Neighbors Respond: The Controversy over the Jedwabne Massacre in Poland by Joanna Michlic and Antony Polonsky of Brandeis University. The book includes articles from Polish and other historians, the IPN's findings, and essays from Polish newspapers such as Rzeczpospolita and Gazeta Wyborcza. The collection features archival documents and essays covering the entire 1939–1941 period. Contributors include Anna Bikont, David Engel, Israel Gutman, Adam Michnik, Bogdan Musial, Dariusz Stola, and Tomasz Strzembosz.

=== My z Jedwabnego (2004) ===
The French translation of Anna Bikont’s book My z Jedwabnego (2004) ("Jedwabne: Battlefield of Memory”), won the European Book Prize in 2011 as Le crime et le silence. The English translation The Crime and the Silence: Confronting the Massacre of Jews in Wartime Jedwabne was published in 2015. Other translations include Swedish (2015), Hebrew (2016), Dutch (2016), Chinese (2018), Italian (2019) and German (2020).

=== The Massacre in Jedwabne, 10 July 1941 (2005) ===
Marek Jan Chodakiewicz's book The Massacre in Jedwabne, 10 July 1941: Before, During, and After challenges Gross's interpretation of events. It suggests that four or five truckloads of armed SS men from Łomża terrorized the local population before leading Jews and Poles to the crime scene. Chodakiewicz argues that all the primary sources are wrong or worthless, including the testimony of Szmul Wasersztajn, the investigation of the 22 suspects for the 1949 trial, and the partial exhumation of the bodies.

"And yet," Piotr Wróbel wrote in The Sarmatian Review, "Chodakiewicz is able to present his recreation of the crime. It was well preplanned, initiated by the Germans, and utterly lacked any pogrom-like spontaneity." Chodakiewicz's good arguments, Wróbel wrote, are "overshadowed by numerous flaws", lack a sense of proportion, and make selective use of information from sources that support Chodakiewicz's view. According to Wróbel, the book has a "visible political agenda" and is "difficult to read, unoriginal, irritating, and unconvincing".

Reviewing the book for History, Peter D. Stachura agreed with Chodakiewicz that the pogrom had been executed by German police, "with only limited involvement from a very small number of Poles", including "Volksdeutsche (Polish citizens of German origin) and petty criminals". In response to Stachura, Joanna Michlic and Antony Polonsky complained about the review to the editor of History. Chodakiewicz's and Stachura's conclusions were "very far from those reached by most historians", they wrote, including the IPN. Chodakiewicz and Stachura "uphold a view of the Polish past which seeks to return to an untenable vision of modern Poland as solely victim and hero ... It is a matter of considerable regret to us that you have allowed your journal to be used to advance this neo-nationalist agenda."

=== Our Class (2009) ===
A 2009 play, Our Class by Polish playwright Tadeusz Słobodzianek, dealing with a massacre of Jews by Poles in a small town during the Holocaust, was performed in London. The play follows the lives of 10 Catholic and Jewish Polish students from the same class at school, beginning in 1925.

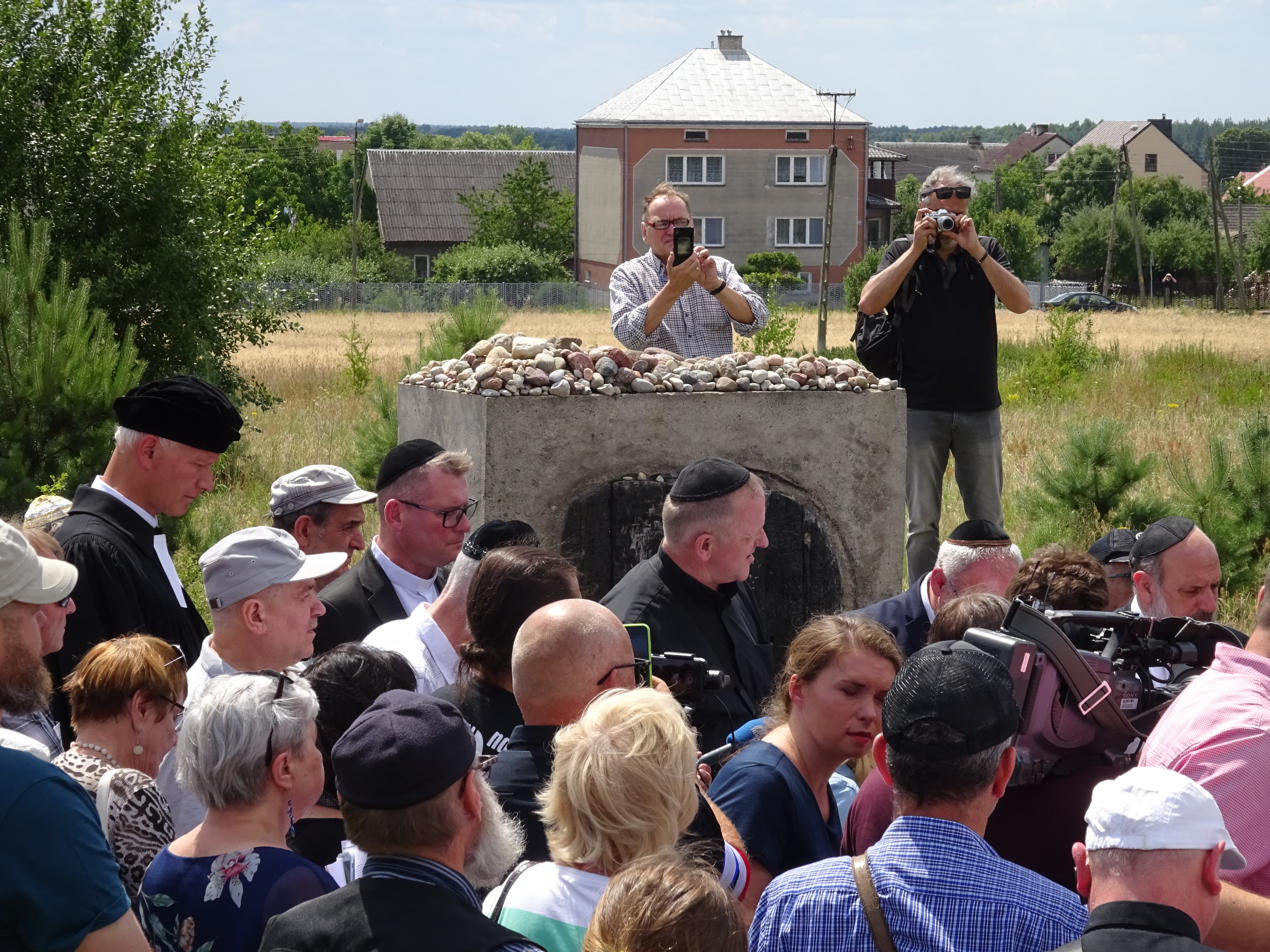
77th anniversary, 2018, Jedwabne monument

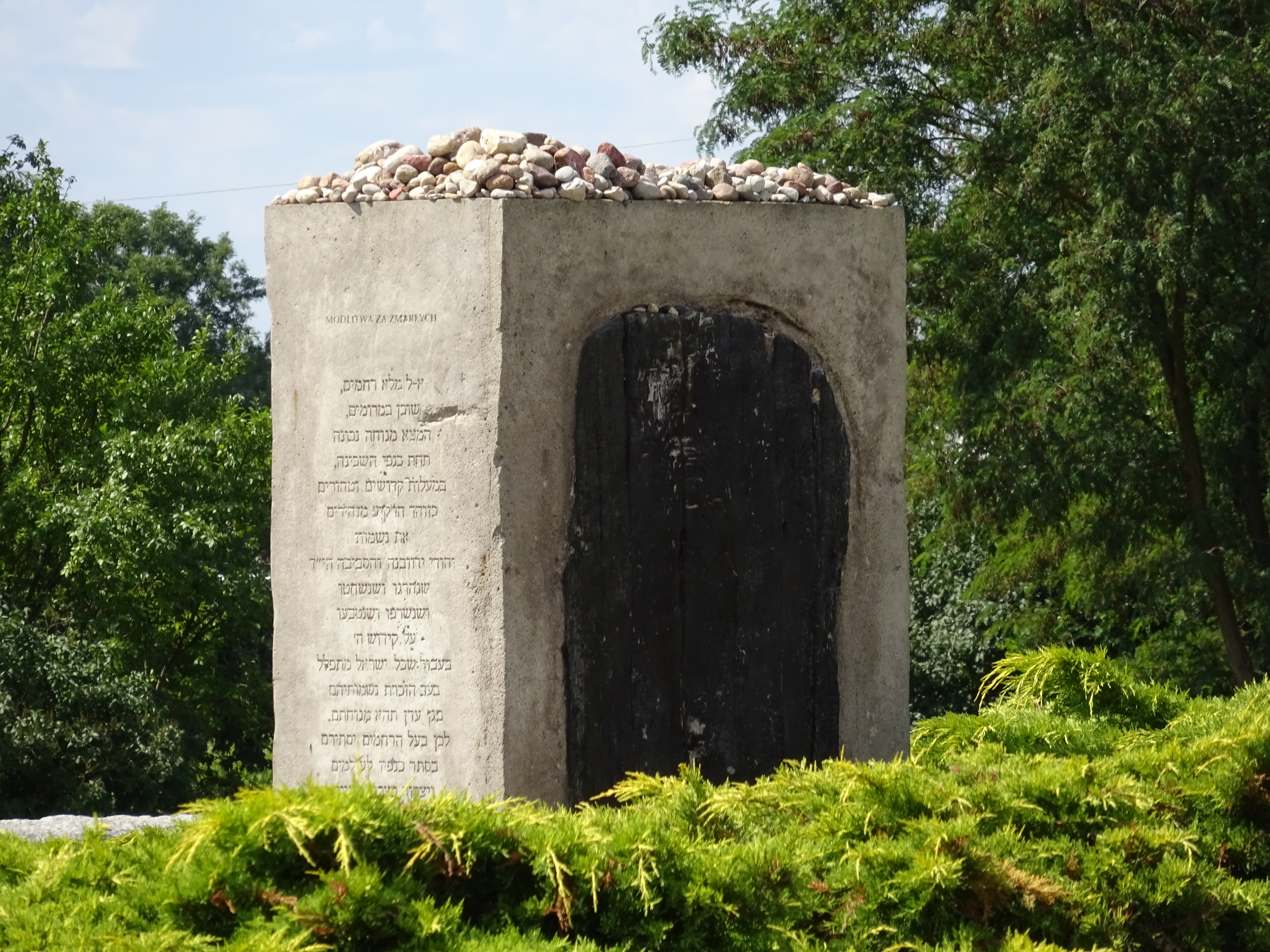

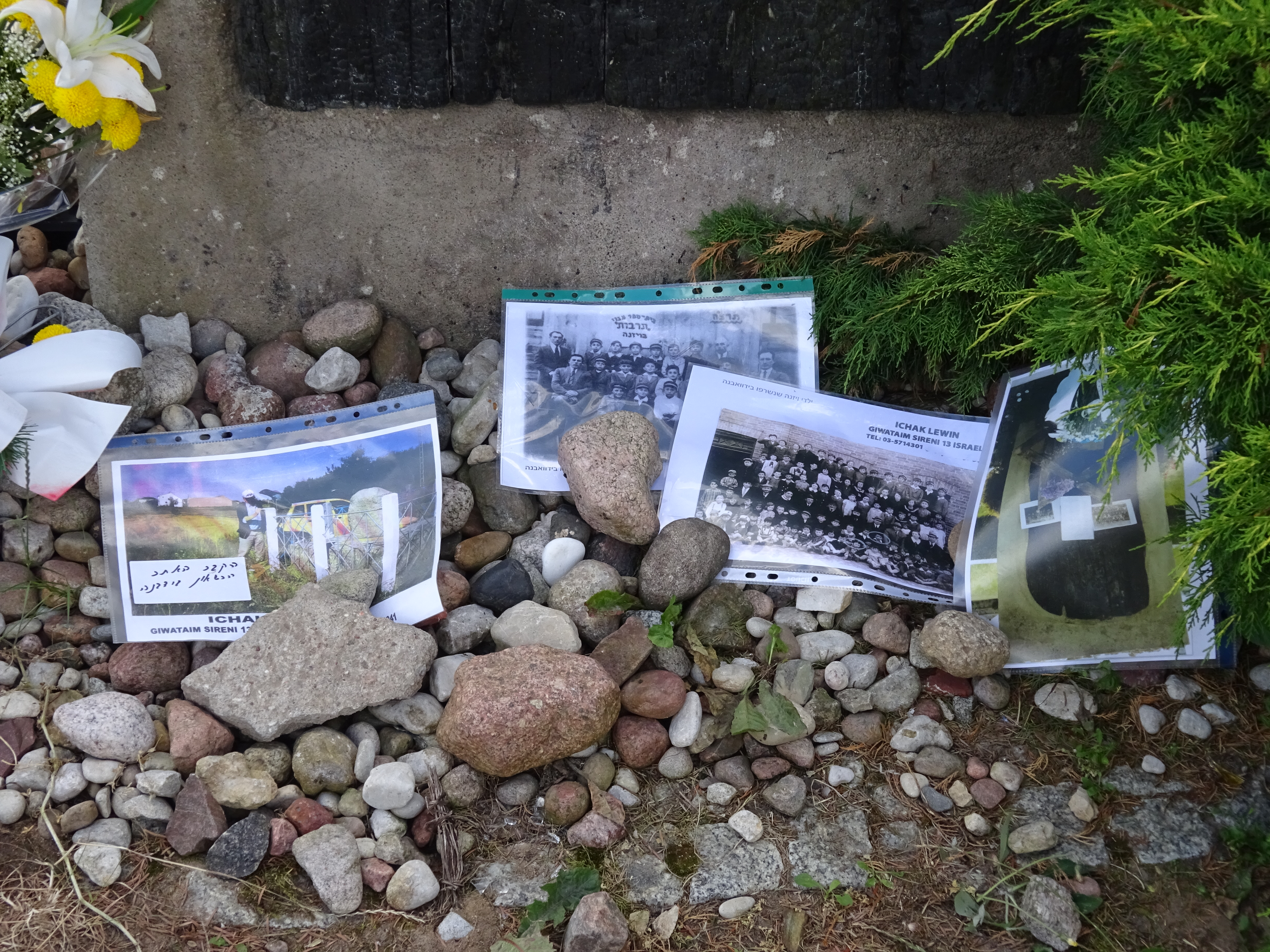

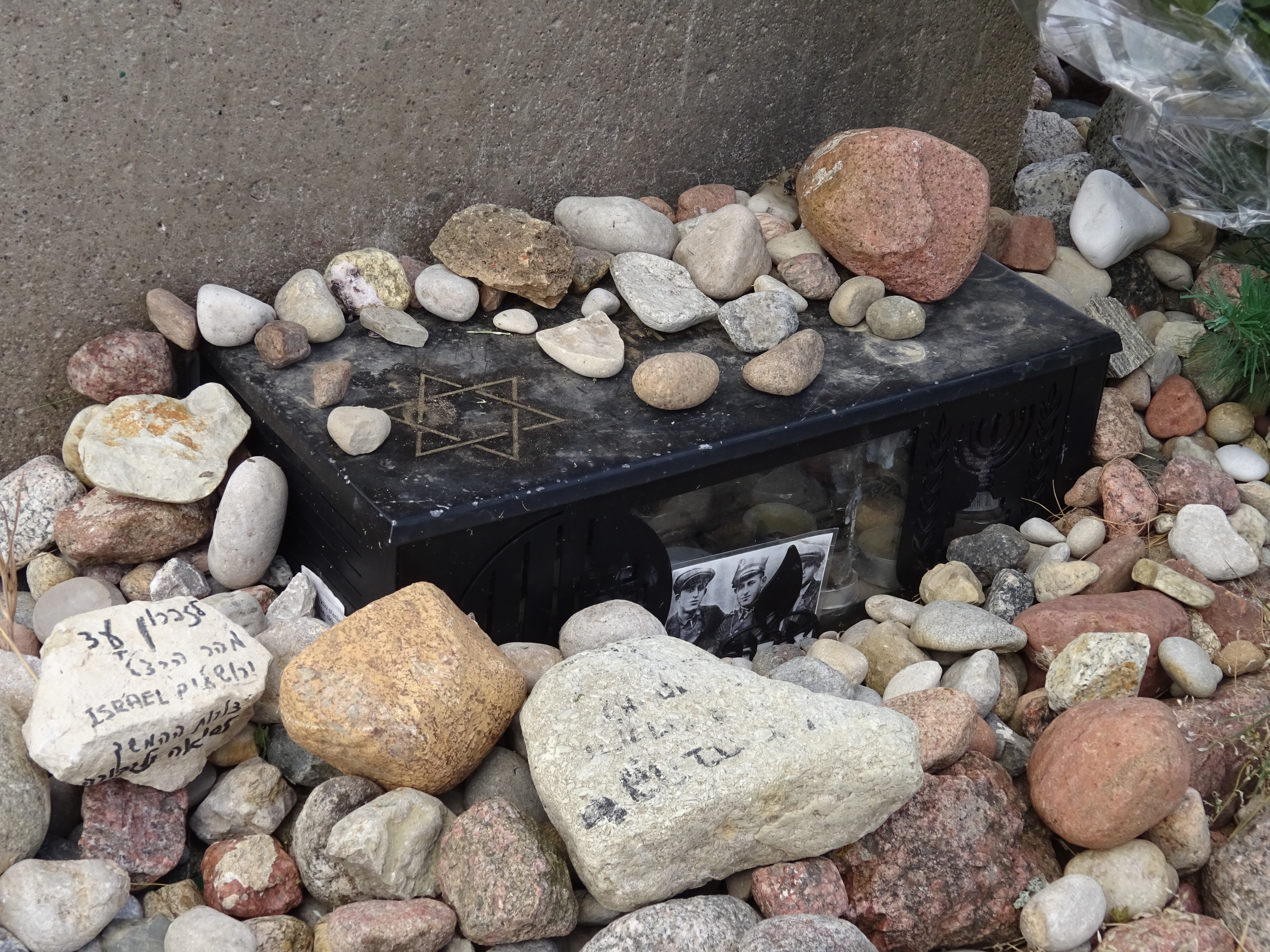

== See also ==
- Aftermath (2012 film)
- I miss you, Jew!
- Anti-Jewish violence in Poland, 1944–1946
- Kaunas pogrom
- Kielce pogrom
- List of anti-Jewish pogroms in Poland during World War II
- Mieczysław Kosmowski
- Polish Righteous Among the Nations

== Sources ==
=== Works cited ===
- Baker, Julius; Tzinovitz, Moshe (1980). "My Hometown Yedwabne, Province of Lomza, Poland". In Baker, Julius; Baker, Jacob (eds.). Yedwabne: History and Memorial Book. Jerusalem and New York: The Yedwabner Societies in Israel and the United States of America. Archived from the original on 4 April 2023.
- Bikont, Anna (2015) [2004]. The Crime and the Silence: Confronting the Massacre of Jews in Wartime Jedwabne. Translated by Alissa Valles. New York: Farrar, Straus and Giroux. ISBN 978-0-374-17879-6.
- Browning, Christopher R. (2004). The Origins of the Final Solution: The Evolution of Nazi Jewish Policy, September 1939 – March 1942. Lincoln: University of Nebraska Press and Yad Vashem. ISBN 978-0803259799.
- Cienciala, Anna M. (2003). "The Jedwabne Massacre: Update and Review". The Polish Review. 48 (1): 49–72. JSTOR 25779370.
- Chodakiewicz, Marek Jan (2001). "Research Before Conclusion: The Problems of Shock Therapy in Jedwabne" (PDF). Glaukopis. Archived (PDF) from the original on 2 August 2020.
- Chodakiewicz, Marek Jan (2005). The Massacre in Jedwabne, July 10, 1941: Before, During, After. Boulder, CO: East European Monographs, distributed by Columbia University Press. ISBN 978-0-88033-554-6.
- Crago, Laura (2012). "Jedwabne". In Megargee, Geoffrey P.; Dean, Martin (eds.). Encyclopedia of Camps and Ghettos, 1933–1945. Vol. IIA. Bloomington and Indianapolis: United States Holocaust Memorial Museum. pp. 899–902. ISBN 978-0-253-35328-3.
- Gross, Jan T. (2001). Neighbors: The Destruction of the Jewish Community in Jedwabne, Poland. Princeton and Oxford: Princeton University Press. ISBN 978-0-14-200240-7.
- Gross, Jan. "Critical Remarks Indeed". In Polonsky & Michlic (2003), pp. 344–370.
- Hackmann, Jörg (2018). "Defending the "Good Name" of the Polish Nation: Politics of History as a Battlefield in Poland, 2015–18". Journal of Genocide Research. 20 (4): 587–606. doi:10.1080/14623528.2018.1528742. ISSN 1462-3528. S2CID 81922100.
- Holc, Janine P. (Autumn 2002). "Working through Jan Gross's Neighbors". Slavic Review. 61 (3): 453–459. doi:10.2307/3090294. ISSN 0037-6779. JSTOR 3090294. S2CID 163923238.
- Holc, Janine P. (Spring 2008). "The Massacre in Jedwabne, July 10, 1941: Before, During, After. By Marek Jan Chodakiewicz". Slavic Review. 67 (1): 202–203. doi:10.2307/27652785. JSTOR 27652785. S2CID 165057267.
- Ignatiew, Radosław J. (9 July 2002). "Press release on final findings of investigation S 1/00/Zn into the killing of Polish citizens of Jewish origin in the town of Jedwabne, on 10 July 1941, i.e. pursuant to Article 1 point 1 of the Decree of 31 August 1944". Warsaw: Institute of National Remembrance (IPN). Archived from the original on 3 October 2002.
- Ignatiew, Radosław J. "Findings of Investigation S1/00/Zn into the Murder of Polish Citizens of Jewish Origin in the Town of Jedwabne on 10 July 1941, pursuant to Article 1 Point 1 of the Decree of 31 August 1944". In Polonsky & Michlic (2003), pp. 133–136.
- Ignatiew, Radosław J. (30 June 2003a). "Postanowienie" (PDF). Warsaw: Institute of National Remembrance (IPN). Archived (PDF) from the original on 14 November 2012.
- Kaczyński, Andrzej. "'Burnt Offering', Rzcezpospolita, 5 May 2000". In Polonsky & Michlic (2003), pp. 133–136.
- Kitchen, Martin (1990). A World in Flames: A Short History of the Second World War. Longman. ISBN 978-0-582-03408-2.
- Longerich, Peter (2010). Holocaust: The Nazi Persecution and Murder of the Jews. Oxford: Oxford University Press. ISBN 978-0-19-280436-5.-->
- Lukowski, Jerzy; Zawadzki, Hubert (2019). A Concise History of Poland (Third ed.). Cambridge: Cambridge University Press. ISBN 978-1-108-42436-3.
- Machcewicz, Paweł; Persak, Krzysztof, eds. (2002). Wokół Jedwabnego. Vol. 1: Studia, 2: Dokumenty. Warsaw: Instytut Pamięci Narodowej. ISBN 978-8389078087. OCLC 470327322. Archived from the original on 5 April 2023.
- Matthäus, Jürgen (2004). "Operation Barbarossa and the Onset of the Holocaust, June–December 1941". In Browning, Christopher (ed.). The Origins of the Final Solution: The Evolution of Nazi Jewish Policy, September 1939 – March 1942. Lincoln: University of Nebraska Press. pp. 244–308. ISBN 978-0803259799.
- Michlic, Joanna Beata (2017). "'At the Crossroads': Jedwabne and Polish Historiography of the Holocaust". Dapim: Studies on the Holocaust. 31 (3): 296–306. doi:10.1080/23256249.2017.1376793. S2CID 165177860.
- Michlic, Joanna B. (2002). "Coming to Terms with the 'Dark Past': The Polish Debate about the Jedwabne Massacre". Vidal Sassoon International Center for the Study of Antisemitism, the Hebrew University of Jerusalem. Jerusalem. Archived from the original on 9 November 2022.
- Michlic, Joanna B.; Polonsky, Antony (January 2008). "Letter to the Editor". History. 93 (309): 154–158. doi:10.1111/j.1468-229x.2008.00415.x.
- Michlic, Joanna (2012). "The Jedwabne Debate: Reshaping Polish National Mythology". In Wistrich, Robert (ed.). Holocaust Denial: The Politics of Perfidy. Berlin, Boston and Jerusalem: Walter de Gruyter and Hebrew University Magnes Press. pp. 67–84. ISBN 978-3-11-028814-8.
- Musial, Bogdan. "The Pogrom in Jedwabne: Critical Remarks about Jan T. Gross's Neighbors". In Polonsky & Michlic (2003), pp. 304–343.
- Nowak-Jezioranski, Jan. "A Need for Compensation". In Polonsky & Michlic (2003), pp. 87–92.
- Persak, Krzysztof (August 2011). "Jedwabne before the Court: Poland's Justice and the Jedwabne Massacre—Investigations and Court Proceedings, 1947–1974". East European Politics and Societies. 25 (3): 410–432. doi:10.1177/0888325411398915. S2CID 145167433.
- Polak, Joseph A. (Winter 2001). "Exhuming Their Neighbors: A Halakhic Inquiry". Tradition: A Journal of Orthodox Jewish Thought. 35 (4): 23–43. JSTOR 23262406.
- Polonsky, Antony; Michlic, Joanna B., eds. (2003). The Neighbors Respond: The Controversy over the Jedwabne Massacre in Poland. Princeton and Oxford: Princeton University Press. ISBN 978-0-691-11306-7.
- Rosenblatt, Adam (2015). Digging for the Disappeared: Forensic Science after Atrocity. Stanford: Stanford University Press. ISBN 978-0-8047-8877-9.
- Rosenfeld, Alvin (2002). "Facing Jedwabne". American Jewish Committee. Archived from the original on 24 May 2012.
- Rossino, Alexander B. (2003). "Polish 'Neighbors' and German Invaders: Contextualizing Anti-Jewish Violence in the Białystok District during the Opening Weeks of Operation Barbarossa". In Steinlauf, Michael; Polonsky, Antony (eds.). Polin: Studies in Polish Jewry. Vol. 16. Oxford: Littman Library of Jewish Civilization. pp. 450–471. ISBN 978-1874774747. OCLC 936831526.
- Shafir, Michael (2012). "Denying the Shoah in Post-Communist Eastern Europe". In Wistrich, Robert (ed.). Holocaust Denial: The Politics of Perfidy. Berlin, Boston and Jerusalem: Walter de Gruyter and Hebrew University Magnes Press. pp. 27–66. ISBN 978-3-11-028814-8.
- Shore, Marci (2005). "Conversing with Ghosts: Jedwabne, Zydokomuna, and Totalitarianism". Kritika: Explorations in Russian and Eurasian History. 6 (2): 345–374. doi:10.1353/kri.2005.0027. S2CID 159586240.
- Stachura, Peter (April 2007). "Review: The Massacre in Jedwabne, 10 July 1941: Before, During, and After". History. 92 (306): 276–277. doi:10.1111/j.1468-229X.2007.394_31.x.
- Stokarska, Jadwiga (23 April 2008). "90. posiedzenie Senatu RP [90th session of the Senate of the Republic of Poland]". The Senate of the Republic of Poland. Archived from the original on 18 October 2014.
- Stola, Dariusz (Spring 2003). "Jedwabne: Revisiting the Evidence and Nature of the Crime". Holocaust and Genocide Studies. 17 (1): 139–152. doi:10.1093/hgs/17.1.139. SSRN 2831412.
- Stone, Dan (2010). Histories of the Holocaust. New York: Oxford University Press. ISBN 978-0-19-956679-2.
- Tec, Nechama (1993). Defiance: The Bielski Partisans. New York: Oxford University Press. ISBN 978-0-19-509390-2.
- Wasersztajn, Szmul (5 April 1945). Deposition (Report). Warsaw: Jewish Historical Institute. "Witness Szmul Wasersztajn, written down by E. Sztejman; chairman of the Voivodeship Jewish Historical Commission, M. Turek; freely translated from the Yiddish language by M. Kwater." Collection no. 301 ("Individual Depositions"), document no. 152 (301/152).
- Wolentarska-Ochman, Ewa (2006). "Collective Remembrance in Jedwabne: Unsettled Memory of World War II in Postcommunist Poland". History and Memory. 18 (1): 152–178. doi:10.2979/his.2006.18.1.152. JSTOR 10.2979/his.2006.18.1.152. S2CID 24138353.
- Wróbel, Piotr (2006a). "Polish-Jewish Relations and Neighbors by Jan T. Gross: Politics, Public Opinion and Historical Methodology". In Hayes, Peter; Herzog, Dagmar (eds.). Lessons and Legacies: The Holocaust in International Perspective, Volume VII. Evanston: Northwestern University Press. pp. 387–399. ISBN 0-8101-2370-3.
- Wróbel, Piotr (2006b). "The Massacre in Jedwabne, July 10, 1941: Before, During, and After". The Sarmatian Review. 26 (3): 1238–1241. Archived from the original on 18 July 2020.
