= Neighbors: The Destruction of the Jewish Community in Jedwabne, Poland =

2000 book by Jan T. Gross

- Author: Jan T. Gross
- Original title: Sąsiedzi: Historia zagłady żydowskiego miasteczka
- Language: Polish
- Subject: Jedwabne massacre
- Genre: historical studies
- Publisher: Fundacja Pogranicze
- Publication date: 2004
- Pages: 157
- ISBN: 9788386872138

Neighbors: The Destruction of the Jewish Community in Jedwabne, Poland is a book published in 2000 written by Princeton University historian Jan T. Gross exploring the July 1941 Jedwabne massacre committed against Polish Jews by their non-Jewish neighbors in the village of Jedwabne in Nazi-occupied Poland.

The book was first published in Polish as Sąsiedzi: Historia zagłady żydowskiego miasteczka (lit. Neighbors: The History of Destruction of a Jewish Town). An English translation was published in 2001.

== Background ==
In 1988 Polish filmmaker Agnieszka Arnold went to Jedwabne with a film-crew and produced two documentaries based on interviews with the local villagers. Gdzie mój starszy syn Kain (1999, “Where Is My Older Son Cain”) was inspired by an ongoing debate in the Polish print media. The second one, Sąsiedzi (2001, “Neighbors”), was aired by the Polish TVP II Channel.

Gross has said that watching Arnold's films inspired him to write his book. With her approval, he used her transcriptions of interviews, in addition to other materials, and her second film title for the title of his book. Arnold was unhappy about the effects of the book on the Jedwabne people.

== Content and impact ==
The book describes the perpetration of the massacre by Polish civilians (a fact first noted by Szymon Datner in 1966), refuting a common notion that the perpetrators were the German occupation forces. The debate that ensued in the media prompted the Polish Institute of National Remembrance (IPN) to open a forensic investigation, which confirmed parts of Gross's findings. The IPN's report stated that "[depositions] made by witnesses confirm complicity of both Germans and Polish inhabitants of the town," and that "residents of Jedwabne and its environs, of Polish nationality, committed these acts." However, it concluded that Gross's estimate of 1,600 victims "seems highly unlikely," giving a plausible range of 250 to 340 victims. Other historians have suggested anything from 600 to close to 1,000 victims.

At the time of the book's publication, the Nazi plan to exterminate Europe's Jewry was well known, but the fact that ordinary Poles in Jedwabne committed such atrocities less so. The publication resulted in much controversy, and a vigorous debate in Poland and abroad. It has led to further forensic study, and discussions of the history of Polish-Jewish relations. According to Geneviève Zubrzycki, "Neighbors created such a rupture in the national narrative of the war that one could speak of Poland “before” and “after” its publication (...) Neighbors provoked... the questioning of a key story of the nation, shaking its identity to its core."

Neighbors provoked an intensive two-year debate in Poland on Polish-Jewish relations. In response to Neighbors, the Polish Parliament ordered an investigation of the Jedwabne pogrom, the IPN investigation. From May 2000 onward, Jedwabne became a frequent topic of discussion in the Polish media. A list compiled by the Polish daily Rzeczpospolita counted over 130 articles in Polish on the pogrom. The Catholic periodical Wiez published a collection of 34 articles on the Jedwabne pogrom, Thou shalt not kill: Poles on Jedwabne, available in English. In 2003 an extensive collection of articles from the Polish debate, in English translation, was compiled by Joanna Michlic and Professor Antony Polonsky of Brandeis University and published under the title The Neighbors Respond.

Neighbors sparked a controversy in Poland. Some readers refused to accept it as a factual account of the Jedwabne pogrom. While Polish historians praised Gross for drawing attention to a topic that had received insufficient attention for a half-century, Marek Jan Chodakiewicz and Tomasz Strzembosz criticized Neighbors for including accounts they considered uncorroborated, and for editorial decisions they believed Gross had made, such as favoring testimonies that presented the Poles in the worst possible light when there were conflicting accounts.

Neighbors inspired among Poles "a new curiosity in Polish Jewish history," including for the Polish film director and screenwriter Władysław Pasikowski. The book and its related controversy inspired his dramatic film Aftermath (2012 Pokłosie), which he wrote and directed.

== Reception ==
=== Polish edition ===
As noted by Joshua D. Zimmerman in his book about contested Polish history, Neighbors inspired a wide-ranging debate in Poland on its release in 2000. While the mainstream Polish press expressed consensus regarding the basic accuracy of Gross's findings, specific details and questions about Gross's methodology were debated by Polish scholars.

According to Jaroslaw Anders, although the book has been criticized in Poland, it has also generated acknowledgment from leading Polish figures such as Józef Cardinal Glemp, who described it as "incontestable", and from Polish President Aleksander Kwaśniewski, who asked Poles to "seek forgiveness for what our compatriots have done." Polish News Service is said to have reported that other Polish publications such as Nasz Dziennik, Głos, Mysl Polska, and Niedziela accused the book of being a "part of international campaign aimed at damaging the image of Poland and preparing ground for restitution of Jewish property."

Tomasz Strzembosz criticized the fact that the often contradictory testimonies on which the book was based were extracted from Polish witnesses in pre-trial beatings conducted by the Security Office (UB) in 1949 as well as selection (and exclusion) of specific testimonies.

Stanisław Musiał, who had been a leading figure in advocating a Catholic-Jewish dialogue and Polish-Jewish reconciliation, wrote that Gross' book had shattered the myth that Poles were solely victims who "themselves never wronged anyone." Agnieszka Magdziak-Miszewska, a former deputy editor-in-chief of the Polish Catholic magazine Znak and Polish consul-general, wrote "I am convinced that Neighbors is a book which had to be written and which is needed. Facing up to the painful truth of Jedwabne is, in my conviction, the most serious test that we Poles have had to confront in the last decade."

According to Joanna B. Michlic, "Gross and his supporters referred to the Polish version of the notion of Judeo-communism (see żydokomuna) as an antisemitic cliché, whereas Gross's opponents, to varying degrees, treated it as an actual historical fact. In the latter group, Judeo-communism served the purpose of rationalizing and explaining the participation of ethnic Poles in killing their Jewish neighbors and, thus in minimizing the criminal nature of the murder." In the introduction to The Neighbors Respond, Antony Polonsky and Joanna B. Michlic state that the harshest critics of Gross, such as Tomasz Strzembosz: "Many of those who have espoused what Andrzejowski describes as a "defensive open" stance in the controversy came to adopt quite extreme positions, as has been the case with Tomasz Strzembosz. They seem to have great difficulty abandoning the self-image of the Poles as heroes and victims and use strongly apologetic arguments."

Gross defended the conclusions he drew from his use of testimonials, and insisted that he differentiated between types of testimony. He pointed out that Neighbors contained "an extensive justification why depositions produced during a trial conducted in Stalinist Poland, extracted by abusive secret police interrogators, are credible in this case."

=== English edition ===
Neighbors was a 2001 National Book Critics Circle Award Finalist and a 2001 National Book Award Finalist. The publication of Neighbors was credited with launching a debate about the Polish role in the Holocaust. Bernard Wasserstein described the book as having "played a productive role in refreshing Polish collective memory of this aspect of World War 2."

Alexander B. Rossino, a research historian at the Center for Advanced Holocaust Studies of the United States Holocaust Memorial Museum in Washington, D.C., wrote: "while Neighbors contributed to an ongoing re-examination of the history of the Holocaust in Poland, Gross' failure to examine German documentary sources fundamentally flawed his depiction of the events. The result was a skewed history that did not investigate SS operations in the region or German interaction with the Polish population." ' Dariusz Stola writing in Holocaust and Genocide Studies states that the book "deserves careful reading and serious critique" and that "if Neighbors were simply poorly researched and written, as some of Gross's critics charge, it would not have been so influential. However, this does not mean the book is flawless." Stola writes that the available evidence is far from sufficient to confirm exact number of victims and a number of eyewitness accounts raise doubts. The postwar accounts of some Jewish survivors, which were contradicted later; and records from the 1949-53 interrogations and trials of the Polish perpetrators by the communist "Security Office", which were often obtained by use of torture, have limited value and can be open to interpretations. Likewise the context of the crime—the unfolding Nazi Holocaust is missing largely from the publication. Stola questions Gross' assumption about lack of Jewish collaboration with the Soviets and the unorganised, spontaneous, "grassroots" nature of the pogrom. Peter Hayes commented in Why? Explaining the Holocaust that Gross's book had "brought renewed attention to the fraught nature of communal relations in Poland under the Nazis". He added that Gross "overstated the numbers of both victims and perpetrators and minimized the instigating role of the Germans but established that local residents did the killing, often in bestial fashion."

== In other media ==
Neighbors and its surrounding controversy inspired Władysław Pasikowski's dramatic 2012 film Aftermath (Pokłosie), which he wrote and directed. Pasikowski said, "The film isn't an adaptation of the book, which is documented and factual, but the film did grow out of it, since it was the source of my knowledge and shame."
