= Antonina Wyrzykowska =

Polish Righteous Among the Nations

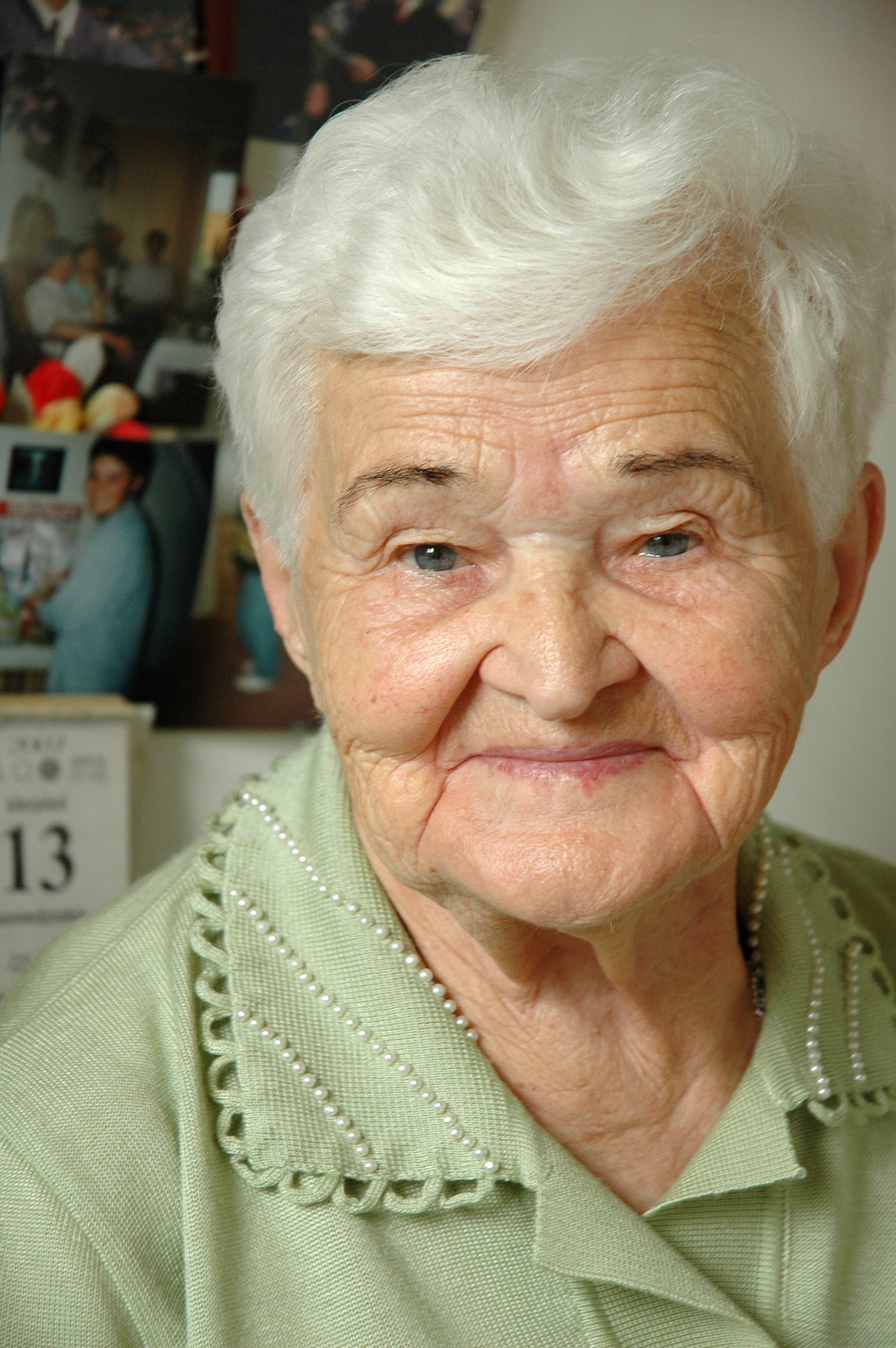
- Portrait of Wyrzykowska at her home, 2007
- Born: Antonina Karwowska; 12 August 1916; Janczewko, General Governorate of Warsaw, German Empire
- Died: 29 November 2011 (aged 95); Milanówek, Masovian Voivodeship, Poland
- Spouse: Aleksander Wyrzykowski
- Honours: Righteous Among the Nations Commander's Cross of the Order of Polonia Restituta

Antonina Wyrzykowska, née Karwowska (12 August 1916 – 29 November 2011) was a Polish Righteous Among the Nations who sheltered Jews fleeing the Jedwabne pogrom on her farm near Łomża during the Nazi occupation of Poland.

== Biography ==
In World War II, during the Nazi occupation of Poland Wyrzykowska saved Jews by hiding several individuals for over two years, using gasoline to mask their scent from German tracker dogs. She also smuggled food into the Łomża Ghetto while wearing a yellow badge. Following the liberation of Poland, Wyrzykowska was severely assaulted by members of the Home Army as punishment for helping her Jewish neighbours. In 2001 Wyrzykowska was unable to attend the unveiling of a new monument to the victims of the Jedwabne Pogrom out of fear of her Home Army attackers, three of whom still resided in the area. Her case has been highlighted by the historian Jan Grabowski as an example of the post-war retribution meted out by the Polish nationalist movement to Poles who had helped Jews during the Holocaust.

=== Recognition ===
President Lech Kaczyński awarded Antonina the Commander's Cross of the Order of Polonia Restituta, and she and her husband Aleksander Wyrzykowski received Yad Vashem's Righteous Among the Nations title in 1976, and in 2007,
