= History policy of the Law and Justice party =

Policy of Polish political party

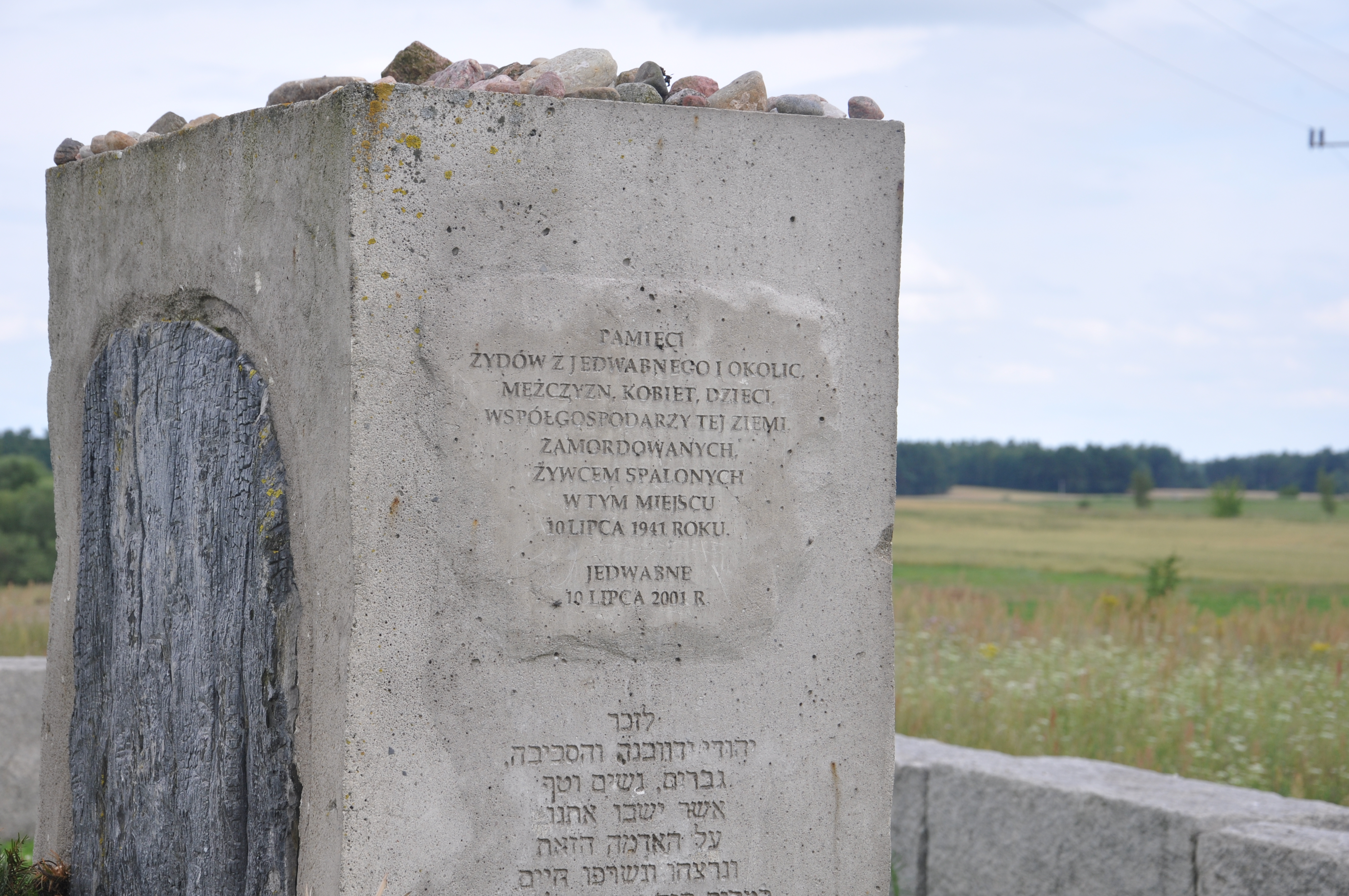
The Law and Justice party views the Jedwabne pogrom, in which hundreds of Jews were killed by Poles, as the center of a "pedagogy of shame".

The program of the Polish Law and Justice (PiS) party has chapters on "identity" (tożsamość) and "history policy" (polityka historyczna, which has sometimes been translated "literally" as "politics of history"). The implementation of the PiS history policy consists in promoting, in Poland and internationally, a version of history based on a policy of memory that focuses on protecting the "good name" of the Polish nation.

In the opinion of critics, this policy produces a narrative that Poles were victims and heroes during World War II and the communist era, and victims of crimes comparable to the Holocaust against Jews. Discussion of events that does not fit this narrative (such as of antisemitism in Poland) is labelled as "pedagogy of shame." "Pedagogy of shame," they argue, aims at dividing/polarizing and thus weakening the nation. It is also argued that at its core it is an effort to accomplish extracting money from Poland (a victim of Nazi Germany), by Jewish people and/or the State of Israel, which is labelled as an absurd proposition. According to the PiS party, this should be replaced with a "pedagogy of pride" which focuses on positive aspects of Polish history. The party's history policy has divided historians, with some working with PiS to establish a history policy, seeing it as important to building a shared positive identity and historical truth and justice, while others see it as politicizing history and distorting historical facts.

== Background ==
British journalist and researcher Jo Harper wrote in 2010 that "the PiS agenda has been clear: Poland will stand up for itself, will look at and raise arguments about things that affected Poles, but will defend against any criticism of Poles in relation to (Polish) Jews, Ukrainians, and other minorities... A central collective theme in this version of the national narrative—one that PiS attempts to exploit—is again of a morally clean nation that witnessed horror but was not an active collaborator in it. There persists a large rump in Polish society, and a series of raw cleavages, both defined by attachment... to the historical narrative of cleanliness. It is precisely along these cleavages and to (and for) this rump that PiS seeks to function, obliging waverers to choose between a patriotic party (PiS) and, by implication, a nonpatriotic one (PO)."

Adam Leszczyński states that, "according to PiS, the source of the profound rift in Polish politics is historical, and dates back at least to the birth of the democratic opposition in the 1970s. Its most important element – the Workers' Defence Committee – grew from left-wing and (to a lesser extent) liberal roots.. [The WDC] supposedly formed an alliance with part of the communist authorities in 1989... they [supposedly] taught Poles to be ashamed of their own history, for example by exposing events like the massacre in Jedwabne... This 'educating by shaming' served to strengthen their grip on Polish people's minds, teaching them to despise their own heritage... PiS is on a mission to reverse the situation, and a vital component is restoring the truth about the past, to give people genuine dignity and pride in their own glorious history. The movement is therefore revolutionary, conservative and emancipatory, all at the same time..." He clarifies that while "PiS's opponents see this vision of history as proof that the party is obsessed with conspiracies... This version of history is standard for the party in power... and serves as the basis for its political activities regarding history."

== Historical policy at the state level ==
Part of Law and Justice's platform was its historical policy to promote the Polish point of view on the national and international level, its important instrument being the Institute of National Remembrance (INR). After the electoral victory of Law and Justice, the INR focused on crimes against the Polish nation. Nikolay Koposov, in his criticism of the history policy in modern Russia notices that in 2000s several post-Soviet Bloc countries, including Poland, started development of new narratives in national histories as part of their search for national identity, with an important aspect being their victimization in history.

The issue of history politics have risen further when in 2015 it was announced that the works had started on the "Strategy of Polish Historical Policy" ("Strategia Polskiej Polityki Historycznej"). President Andrzej Duda announced that "carrying out the historical policy is one of the most important activities of the president".

Waldemar Brenda of the INR stated that the historical policy should not amount to the manipulation of facts, but to their interpretation, which, while not deviating from the historical truth, would serve the "building of pro-social foundations". Several scholars have criticized the INR for turning in recent years, from objective historical research towards historical revisionism.

== "Pedagogy of shame" ==
Any events that do not support the "nationalist vision of history, education, and upbringing", such as antisemitism in Poland, are viewed as part of a "pedagogy of shame" or "pedagogy of disgrace" (Polish: pedagogika wstydu) that must be reinterpreted or ignored. According to Polish nationalists, the "pedagogy of shame" is promoted by the European Union, Gazeta Wyborcza, and liberalism. In 2018, the Polish Teachers' Union stated that the term "pedagogy of shame" has no scholarly basis and should not be used, as it "justif[ies] the denial of parts of historical knowledge". At the center of the "pedagogy of shame" is the Jedwabne pogrom; conclusions of research that the pogrom was carried out by Poles are viewed as an attack on "Polishness, Polish values and traditions, and Polish identity". The party aims to replace "pedagogy of shame" with "pedagogy of pride", defined by Jolanta Ambrosewicz-Jacobs as "emphasizing Polish heroism, the rescue of Jews and noble behavior during WWII in general". She writes that both concepts "are right-wing rhetoric and do not reflect any established pedagogical concepts"; instead, they reflect "the perception of Poles as an exclusively positive nation, not recognized enough in the world for just and courageous actions".

Members of the ruling party have used the expression. In 2012, after US president Barack Obama mentioned "Polish death camps" in a speech, Jarosław Kaczyński stated, "We need to make it clear today […] the end of the pedagogy of shame, the end of this constant expiation of our nation, for whatever reason, self-blame, because this is what makes it easier and even encourages us to do this kind of activity, it causes terrible losses for us." Obama later apologized for using the expression, saying that he misspoke. In 2016, members of PiS called for the reexamination of the Jedwabne and Kielce pogroms, stating that the current understanding underestimated the role of Nazi and Communist perpetrators respectively. Education minister Anna Zalewska, during a TV interview refused to state directly who was responsible for Kielce Pogrom while stating that around Jedwabne there were many misunderstandings, avoiding directly naming perpetrators; she subsequently stated that she acknowledges Polish citizens were co-responsible for Jedwabne but this should be put into context of German occupation, and other events like Polish Underground sentencing people for murdering Jews should also be taken into account when remembering Polish-Jewish relations.

== Changes in school curriculum ==
The government has changed the school curriculum and commemoration of Holocaust Memorial Day to be dominated by discussions of Polish Righteous Among the Nations rather than Jewish victims of the Holocaust or the reactions of other Poles who did not behave as heroes. According to Piotr Żuk, the changes to the curriculum "in effect reduce education to the process of internalization of major national myths and transfer a simplified vision of reality".

== Amendment to the Act on the Institute of National Remembrance ==
A notable element of party's historical policy was the 2018 Amendment to the Act on the Institute of National Remembrance (colloquially known as the Holocaust Law), which bans public speech which attributes responsibility for the Holocaust to Poland or the Polish nation. The law was met with widespread international criticism as it is seen as an infringement on freedom of expression, academic freedom, and a barrier to open discussion on Polish collaborationism.

== Museums ==
According to Polish journalist Agata Pyzik, the party has tried to "weaponize" museums since the opening of the Warsaw Uprising Museum in 2004. Scholars Irmgard Zündorf and Andreas Etges write that, since 2015, "the Polish museum landscape has turned into a battleground between politicians and historians". The party has fired or tried to fire various museum directors and boards that do not conform to the party line on history. For example, the Museum of the Second World War had its director and original board, including Norman Davies and Timothy Snyder, removed. The new management changed the museum exhibits to place a heavy emphasis on the victimization of ethnic Poles during the war. The new exhibits caused a scandal by portraying Romuald Rajs as a hero and attracted criticism from the United Nations Human Rights Committee. The government also pressured Dariusz Stola, director of the POLIN Museum of the History of Polish Jews, to leave his position after he won the public competition for the position. The party especially criticized the exhibit "Estranged. March ’68 and Its Aftermath" which includes a wall of antisemitic quotes from 1968 to 2018. Although unattributed, two of them are from sympathizers of the party.

The establishment of the Markowa Ulma-Family Museum of Poles Who Saved Jews in World War II plays a major role in PiS's attempts at re-narration of the Holocaust in which PiS casts Poles and Jews as equal victims.

== Analysis of the policy ==
Joanna Michlic states that "according to PiS’s histor[y] policy, the historian can only be a servant of the state who remakes and reshapes history according to the orders of the state."

Jörg Hackmann concludes that "a major interest of [the] current histor[y] policy [of] the government led by the PiS party is to put Poles and Jews upon an equal level of victimization... In internal politics... the main goal is [for PiS to] tak[e] control of institutions... and marginaliz[e] opponents [by] shaping a monolithic view of the ethnic Polish nation, which [comes to] appear... as the first victim of Nazi and Soviet rule... From such a perspective the impact of the Jedwabne debate... has to be [oppos]ed... because it has been motivated by an aspiration for “disgrace”... In a similar perspective the notion of critical patriotism... was dismissed as politically naïve and harmful. In addition, it has been assumed that the government’s memory [and history] poli[cie]s serve as auxiliary means for securing majorities [i]n other fields of politics..." Hackmann further concludes that "internal as well as international polarization is a major driving force behind the current official Polish memory policy... it seems that the general goal behind this histor[y] policy is not so much [to] turn... the wheel of time back and to revive an antisemitic discourse... [as] to establish a new national vision that equa[te]s the Holocaust with the genocide of Poles, or [in] other words aims at “de-Judaizing the Holocaust”.

== Responses ==
According to Jörg Hackmann "The international scholarly assessment of the historical policy by PiS is widely negative..." Timothy Snyder sees an "implicit alliance" with Russian forms of historical revisionism. In 2017, Norman Davies stated that "PiS wants to politicize history to a degree unseen in the last 25 years". Jan Grabowski referred to "Holocaust distortion" in Poland, stating "Its major selling point is that it delivers the message what people want to hear: the Holocaust happened, but my nation, group, tribe, had nothing to do with it". President of the Polish PEN International chapter, Adam Pomorski, stated that "for the first time since totalitarianism, the rulers want to change people's consciousness". Polish journalist Agata Pyzik describes PiS historical policy as "a pumped-up martyr complex focused on conspiracy theories". The UN special rapporteur on civil and political rights stated that the pressure on museum directors to follow the party line was "unacceptable". According to David Cadier and Kacper Szulecki, "the historical discourse of the PiS government is a reflection of the party’s reliance on populism as a political mode of articulation in that it seeks to promote a Manichean, dichotomic and totalizing re-definition of the categories of victim, hero and perpetrator".

== See also ==
- Called by Name
- Memory laws
