= Act on the Institute of National Remembrance =

1998 Polish law

The Act on the Institute of National Remembrance – Commission for the Prosecution of Crimes against the Polish Nation (Polish: Ustawy o Instytucie Pamięci Narodowej - Komisji Ścigania Zbrodni przeciwko Narodowi Polskiemu) is a 1998 Polish law that created the Institute of National Remembrance. This memory law was amended twice, in 2007 and 2018.

The 1998 Act's Article 55 criminalized historical negationism of crimes committed against Poles or Polish citizens by Nazi or communist polities; of crimes against peace or humanity; of war crimes; and of political repression—all these being listed in Sections 1 a and 1 b of Article 1. While Holocaust denial was not explicitly mentioned, it is understood to be implicity criminalized.

The 2007 Amendment dealt with lustrations conducted in Poland.

The 2018 Amendment added an Article 55a, which seeks to defend the "good name" of Poland and its people against unfounded accusations of complicity in the Holocaust. Also added by the 2018 Amendment was an Article 2a, addressing crimes against "Polish citizens" by "Ukrainian nationalists", which has been seen as an act of exclusion against ethnic minorities. Following an international outcry, defamation of Poland and the Polish people through unfounded accusations of complicity in the Holocaust, under Article 55a, was amended to a civil offense that can be tried in civil courts. Article 2a was appealed by Polish President Andrzej Duda and was found to be unconstitutional by the Polish Constitutional Tribunal, which declared it null and void.

== 1998 act ==
The Institute of National Remembrance was established by a Sejm Act of 18 December 1998.

=== Article 55 ===
The Act's article 55 criminalized "public denial, against the facts, of Nazi crimes, communist crimes, and other offenses constituting crimes against peace, crimes against humanity or war crimes, committed against persons of Polish nationality or against Polish citizens of other nationalities between 1 September 1939 and 31 July 1990"; and is therefore sometimes restrictively referred to as the law against Holocaust denial.

In 1999 a University of Opole history professor, Dariusz Ratajczak, was tried under Article 55 for his Holocaust denial, was found guilty, and was sentenced to a year's probation.

== 2006 amendment ==
A 2006 amendment to the law, passed by the Law and Justice government, was dubbed the "Lex Gross" as it targeted Jan Gross and his scholarship on the Jedwabne pogrom. The law was struck down by the Constitutional Court in 2007. The 2018 amendment is derived from it, following the appointment of judges favorable to Law and Justice.

== 2007 amendment ==
The 2007 amendment dealt with lustrations conducted in Poland.

== 2018 amendment ==
The Amendment to the Act on the Institute of National Remembrance of 2018 is a Polish law that penalizes public speech which attributes responsibility for the Holocaust to Poland or the Polish nation. Article 2a, addressing crimes against "Polish citizens" by "Ukrainian nationalists", also caused controversy. The legislation is part of the historical policy of the Law and Justice party which seeks to present a narrative of ethnic Poles exclusively as victims and heroes. The law met with widespread international criticism, as it was seen as an infringement on freedom of expression and on academic freedom, and as a barrier to open discussion on Polish collaborationism, in what has been described as "the biggest diplomatic crisis in [Poland's] recent history".
