= Hitler Strikes Poland =

WW2 history book

Hitler Strikes Poland: Blitzkrieg, Ideology, and Atrocity
- Author: Alexander B. Rossino
- Language: English
- Genre: Non-fiction
- Publication date: 2003

Hitler Strikes Poland: Blitzkrieg, Ideology, and Atrocity is a 2003 book by Alexander B. Rossino about the German invasion of Poland and its subsequent occupation.
