= Antony Polonsky =

Historian of Jewish and Polish history

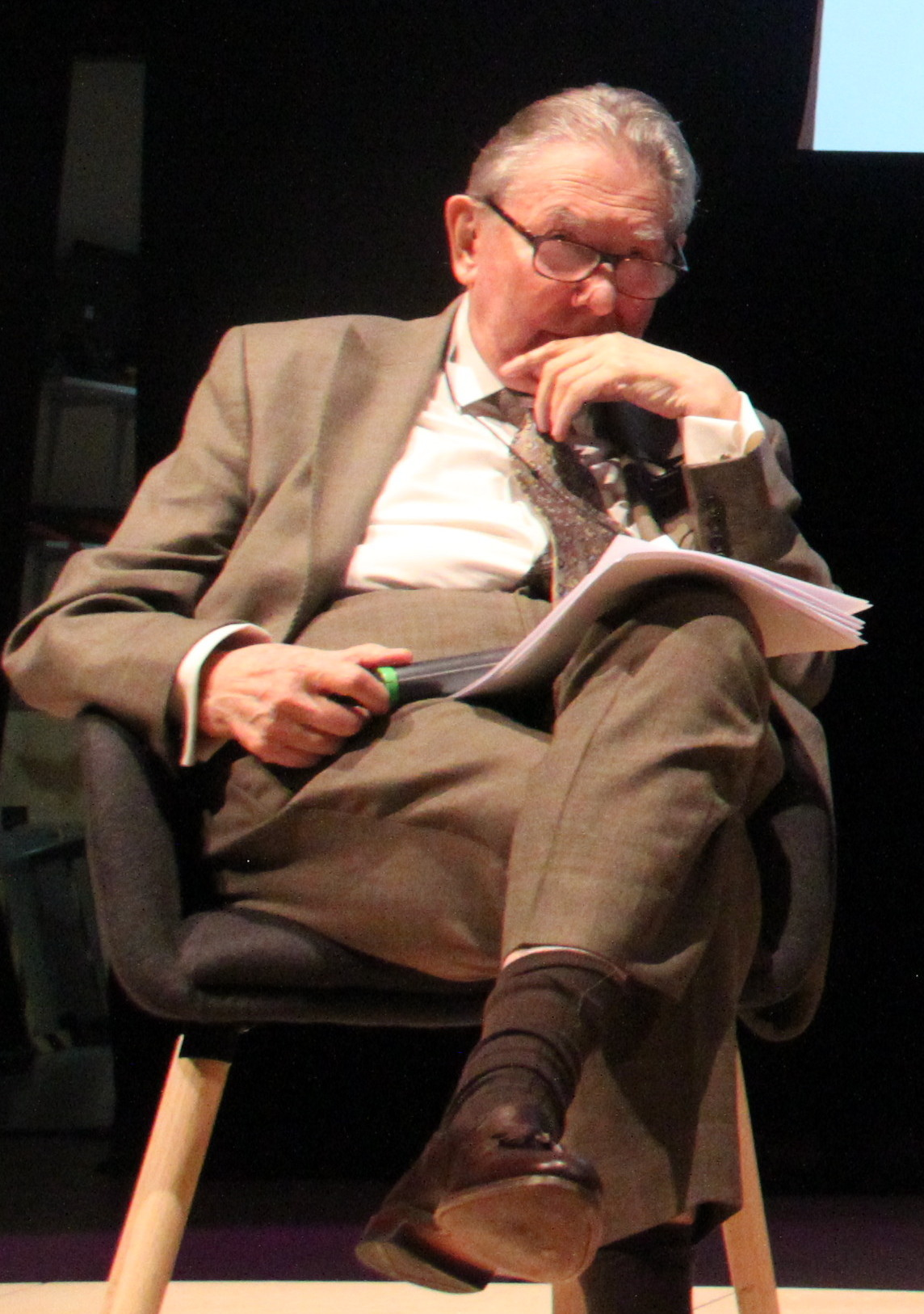
- Polonsky in 2019
- Born: September 23, 1940 (age 85); Johannesburg, South Africa
- Education: University of the Witwatersrand
- Occupation: Historian
- Honours: Knight's Cross of the Order of Merit of the Republic of Poland

Antony Barry Polonsky (born September 23, 1940) is Emeritus Professor of Holocaust Studies at Brandeis University. He is the author of many historical works on the Holocaust, and is an expert on Polish Jewish history.

== Career ==
Antony Polonsky was born in Johannesburg, South Africa to Lithuanian Jewish immigrant parents who arrived in South Africa in the late 19th century. His father was from a Yiddish speaking family from near Grodno (in modern Belarus) and his mother was from a Russified Jewish family from Lithuania. Polonsky was not raised in a Polish speaking background.

Polonsky has compared his childhood, growing up in South Africa, to the movie The Help, being brought up by African servants who had no political rights. As a student at the University of the Witwatersrand, Polonsky organised non-violent demonstrations against apartheid policies. A Rhodes Scholarship took him to England to read modern history at Worcester College and St Antony's College. His doctoral thesis at Oxford was a study of Józef Piłsudski's relationship with parliament, subtitled: The Crisis of Parliamentary Government in Poland, 1922-1931. Polonsky became a lecturer in International History at the London School of Economics in 1970, and was appointed as professor in 1989. When it was discovered that Polonsky had redirected more than £24,000 of research money he had claimed in the name of colleagues and donated it to Oxford's Institute of Polish-Jewish Studies, disciplinary proceedings were instituted. Although the amount was repaid (including 15,000 from the Institute's own funds), the misappropriation, which was used to finance Institute publications, nevertheless proved highly embarrassing for Polonsky. The disciplinary committee found that although his publications had brought credit to the London School of Economics, he should be 'severely reprimanded'. He decided to take early retirement and seek a new position. Polonsky then moved to Brandeis University in 1992, and in 1999 was appointed Albert Abramson Professor of Holocaust Studies—held jointly at Brandeis and at the United States Holocaust Memorial Museum. He has served as a visiting professor at the University of Warsaw, the Institute for the Human Sciences, Vienna and the University of Cape Town; he has also been a visiting fellow at the Oxford Centre for Hebrew and Jewish Studies.

Polonsky has played a leading role in setting up the Institute for Polish-Jewish Studies in Oxford, and served for six years on the Board of Deputies of British Jews, including membership of the Yad Vashem Memorial Committee. Polonsky also spent time at the Department of Hebrew and Jewish Studies at University College, London, and is an Associate of the Harvard Ukrainian Research Institute. President Aleksander Kwaśniewski presented the Knight's Cross of the Order of Merit of the Republic of Poland to Polonsky in 1999. In 2006, he received the Rafael Scharf award from the Judaica Foundation in Kraków for "outstanding achievement in preserving and making known the heritage of Polish Jewry". He is the founder and general editor of Polin. A Journal of Polish-Jewish Studies, perhaps the only scholarly publication devoted entirely to Polish–Jewish history. It received the National Jewish Book Award in the Eastern European Studies category in 2000.

In 2011, Polonsky was awarded the Kulczycki Book Prize by the Association for Slavic, East European, and Eurasian Studies for Volumes I and II of The Jews in Poland and Russia.

== Themes ==
In The Jews in Poland and Russia, Volume I, Polonsky describes how "shtetl" culture emerged in the Polish–Lithuanian Commonwealth in the 16th and 17th centuries during the process of Polish colonization of Ukraine. In private towns, owned by Polish nobility and distanced from royal authority, the Jewish community assisted the landowner in turning their estates into profitable concerns. In this context, "Jewish communal autonomy became an integral part of the Polish political system. Jews appointed their own rabbis and communal authorities and collected their own taxes, for their own communities and for the state."

With the partition of Poland, most Jews found themselves living under the rule of Russia. "In a single blow, a state without Jews became the largest Jewish state in the world." Polonsky argues that interference with Jewish life during the reigns of Catherine the Great and Nicholas I was motivated more by the Russian rulers' integrationist policies, rather than by antisemitism. The reforms of Alexander II led to circles of integrated culture, primarily in Odesa and St Petersburg. The retreat of the tsarist government from integrationist policies during the period from 1881 to 1914 led to a rise in the poverty of the Jewish masses. But a period of enormous creativity and transformation of religious culture coincided with these years of repression.

Professor Jeffrey Veidlinger has commented that Polonsky's history of the Jews in Poland and Russia helps to “correct the nostalgic and romanticized portraits of what is sometimes considered a lost civilization, while simultaneously demonstrating the vibrancy and diversity of Jewish life in the region.”

Reviewing the first two volumes of Polonsky's three volume The Jews in Poland and Russia, The Jewish Chronicle wrote that Polonsky wants "to avoid the earlier tendencies to either dismiss the eastern European Jewish experience as backward (the approach of the great German Jewish historian, Heinrich Graetz) and ultimately doomed to extinction or, alternatively, to view it nostalgically post-Holocaust as an unchanging and harmonious lost world." The reviewer concludes that Polonsky succeeds in his task, but says that the books are most successful when they manage to synthesise experiences across regions and time periods, particularly in the mini-studies of Jewish Places, Jewish Literature and Women.

Timothy Snyder, reviewing Volume Three of The Jews in Poland and Russia in The Wall Street Journal, praises the book but suggests that Polonsky could have made a stronger link between imperial Russia and modern German anti-Semitism. Snyder suggests that after the 1917 revolution, the White Russian commanders fled to the west, bringing with them a concept of the Bolshevik revolution as profoundly Jewish. Snyder argues that the "Judeo-Bolshevik" idea, "brought west by Russians and Baltic Germans after the Bolshevik victory in Russia's civil wars, became an integral part of Hitler's vision." Nonetheless, Snyder calls Polonsky's three volume work "a grand history in the old 19th-century style, a result all the more remarkable because he cannot have the confidence in progress that historians of that age possessed."

Polonsky has written that one of the biggest issues confronting historians of the Holocaust is that all of the countries of Eastern Europe were subjected to two occupations— the German Nazi and the Soviet Russian occupation. The Poles, the Lithuanians, Latvians, and the Ukrainians, were faced with two enemies, and faced the dilemma of how to choose between them. In a talk at the United States Holocaust Museum, Polonsky said:

The Jews were in a different position. For the Jews, the Nazis were unequivocally enemies, whose goal was to destroy physically Jews in Eastern Europe. The Soviets were potential allies. So we’re talking about a very complicated situation in which two totalitarian systems are in conflict, and in which a lot of innocent people on all sides are suffering. And what we need to do is to understand the complexity of these events and show some empathy for all those people—including Jews—caught up in this tragic conflict."

In Volume Three of The Jews in Poland and Russia, Polonsky critiques the typology which Raul Hilberg established in his analysis of the Holocaust, dividing those involved into perpetrators, victims, and bystanders. Polonsky writes that the term 'bystander' is problematic, because "the implication that the bystanders had free choice, as in the parable of the good Samaritan, either to assist the Jews or go on their way fails to take into account the nature of Nazi rule." Polonski argues that those people living under Nazi occupation were subject to savage treatment, adding that "assistance to Jews was punished severely, often by death, while participation in the looting and murder of Jews was rewarded, particularly in the case of those who served in local police forces and other units subordinate to the Germans." Polonsky writes that criticism of people living under German occupation in Eastern Europe is often overtly moralistic, and accompanied by unsubstantiated speculation about what these so-called 'bystanders' might have done.

== Major publications ==
- Politics in Independent Poland: The Crisis of Constitutional Government (Clarendon Press, 1972)
- The Little Dictators: The History of Eastern Europe since 1918 (Routledge and Kegan Paul, 1975) ISBN 978-0-7100-8095-0
- The Great Powers and the Polish Question, 1941-1945 (London School of Economics, 1976) ISBN 978-0-85328-046-0
- The Beginnings of Communist Rule in Poland, December 1943-July 1945, co-author with Bolesaw Drukier (Routledge and Kegan Paul, 1980) ISBN 978-0-7100-0540-3
- A History of Poland, co-author with Oskar Halecki (Routledge, 1983) ISBN 978-0-7100-8647-1
- The History of Poland Since 1863, co-editor with R.F. Leslie, et al., (Cambridge University Press, 1983) ISBN 978-0-521-27501-9
- 'My Brother's Keeper?': Recent Polish Debates on the Holocaust, editor (Routledge, 1990) ISBN 978-0-415-04232-1
- Jews in Eastern Poland and the USSR, 1939-46, co-editor with Norman Davies. (New York: St. Martin’s Press, 1991) ISBN 978-0-312-06200-2
- Contemporary Jewish Writing in Poland: An Anthology, co-editor with Monika Adamczyk-Garbowska, (University of Nebraska Press, 2001) ISBN 978-0-8032-3721-6
- The Neighbors Respond: The Controversy over the Jedwabne Massacre in Poland, co-editor with Joanna B. Michlic, (Princeton University Press, 2004) ISBN 978-0-691-11306-7
- The Jews in Poland and Russia, Volume 1: 1350-1881 (Littman Library of Jewish Civilization, 2009) ISBN 978-1-874774-64-8
- The Jews in Poland and Russia, Volume 2: 1881-1914 (Littman Library of Jewish Civilization, 2009) ISBN 978-1-904113-83-6
- The Jews in Poland and Russia, Volume 3: 1914-2008 (Littman Library of Jewish Civilization, 2011) ISBN 978-1-904113-48-5
