= Agnieszka Arnold =

Polish documentary filmmaker (born 1947)

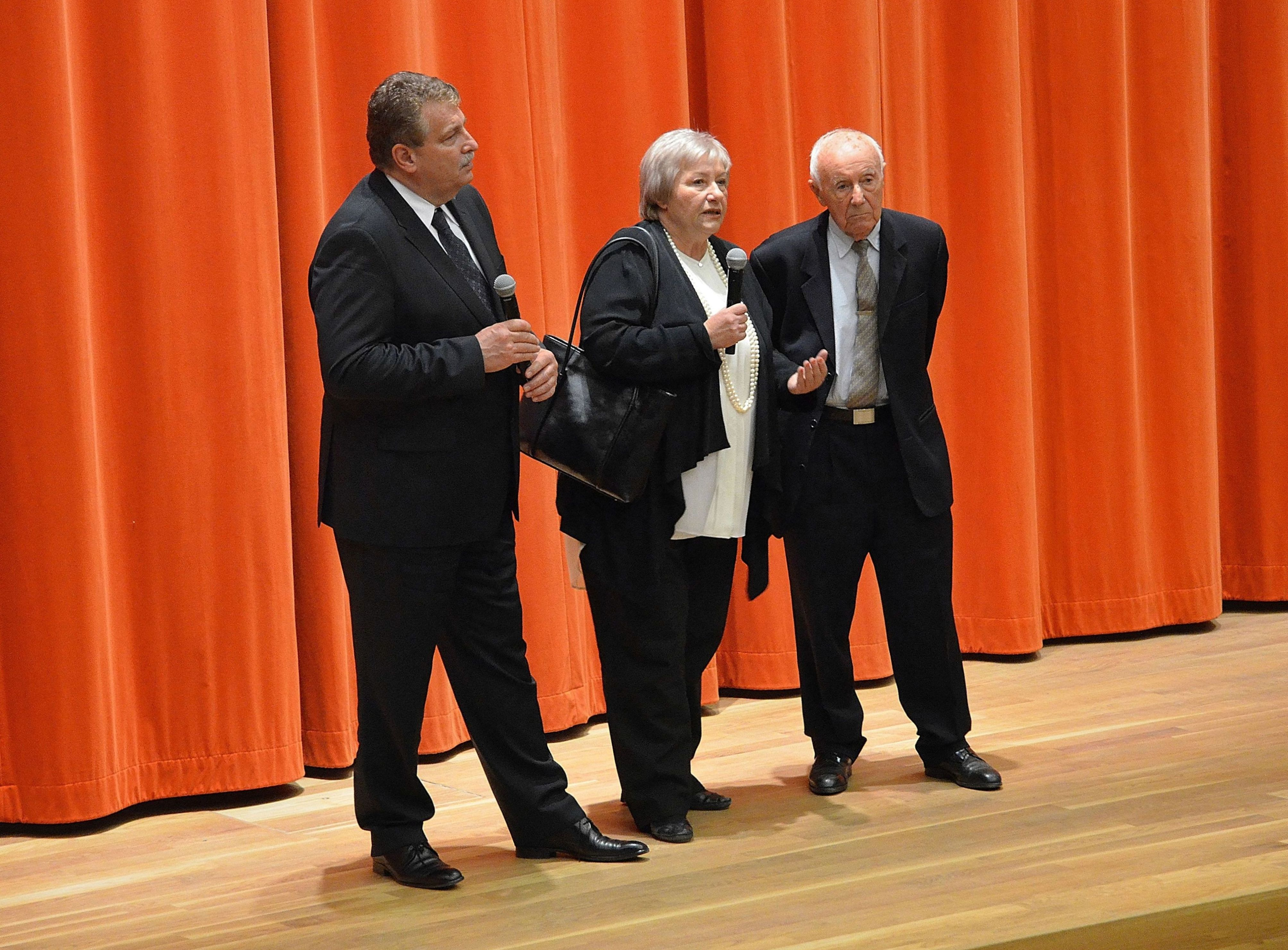
- Krzysztof Grabowski, Agnieszka Arnold, and Symcha Ratajzer at the 20 April 2013 premiere of Rotem at the Museum of the History of Polish Jews in Warsaw
- Born: September 24, 1947 (age 78); Łowicz, Poland

Agnieszka Arnold (born 24 September 1947 in Łowicz) is a Polish documentary filmmaker born 1947. She compiled two documentaries on the Jedwabne pogrom of Jewish villagers, during World War II, by their Polish neighbors.

== Films ==
- Miś (1980) - Assistant director
- Kto ziarno nadziei siał (1993)
- Anoszim, noszim, we-taf... (1993)
- Mit, tradycja, rzeczywistość (1994)
- Miasteczko (1995)
- Oberek (1996)
- Ocalona (1996)
- Bareizm (1997)
- Na początku była Trzcinica (1997)
- ...Gdzie mój starszy syn Kain (1999)
- Ikona Bożego Narodzenia (2000)
- Czarny lipiec (2001)
- Sąsiedzi (2001)
- Bohater (2002) - on Romuald Rajs
- Historia matematyka polski (2003)
- Oczyszczenie (2003)
- Przebaczenie (2003)
- Polak z Żytomierza (2004)
- Lider (2005)
- Zula z Czeczenii (2005)
- Bunt Janion (2006)
- Niepodległość bez cenzury (2006)
