= Piotr Wróbel =

Polish-Canadian historian

Piotr Jan Wróbel
- Born: 1953 (age 72–73)

Academic background
- Education: University of Warsaw; University of Toronto

Academic work
- Discipline: History
- Sub-discipline: Polish history, Central and Eastern European history

Piotr Jan Wróbel (born 1953) is a Polish-Canadian historian and expert specializing in Polish history and Central and Eastern European history. His academic research revolves around the national minorities of Central and Eastern Europe with special focus on Polish-Jewish relations and the history of Polish Jewry since the Partitions of Poland.

Wróbel is currently a Professor Emeritus in the Department of History at the Faculty of Arts and Science of the University of Toronto, as well as a member of the Faculty at the Munk School of Global Affairs at the University of Trinity College in the University of Toronto.

Piotr Wróbel received his Doctor of Philosophy degree (PhD) at the University of Warsaw, where he taught. He also taught at the University of Michigan at Ann Arbor, Michigan State University in East Lansing, as well as at the University of California, Davis. Between 1994 and 2025, Wróbel taught history at the University of Toronto. He has been a visiting scholar at the Institute of European History at Mainz, as well as at the Humboldt University of Berlin; and, at the Institute for Polish–Jewish Studies at the University of Oxford.

Wróbel has authored or co-authored seven books, and more than 75 articles published in Poland, Great Britain, Canada, and the United States. He serves on the advisory board of Polin: A Journal of Polish–Jewish Studies.

== Selected publications ==
- Listopadowe dni-1918, 1988, Instytut Wydawniczy P.A.X
- Droga powrotna: niemiecki prawicowy ruch kombatancki po I wojnie światowej, 1989, Książka i Wiedza
- Kształtowanie siȩ białoruskiej świadomości narodowej a Polska, 1990, Wydawnictwa Uniwersytetu Warszawskiego
- Zarys dziejów Żydów na ziemiach polskich w latach 1880-1918, 1991, Wydawnictwa Uniwersytetu Warszawskiego
- Prezydenci i premierzy drugiej rzeczypospolitej (with A Chojnowski), 1992, Zakład Narodowy im. Ossolínskich
- The Jews of Galicia under Austrian-Polish Rule, 1869–1918, 1994, Cambridge University Press
- Double memory: Poles and Jews after the Holocaust, 1997, University of Toronto, (view as PDF)
- Historical Dictionary of Poland, 1945-1996.
