= Alexander B. Rossino =

American novelist

Alexander Brian Rossino (born 1966) is an American historian and writer specializing in World War II in Poland and the American Civil War.

Rossino is the author of Hitler Strikes Poland: Blitzkrieg, Ideology, and Atrocity (2003) and a novel, Six Days in September: A Novel of Lee's Army in Maryland, 1862 (2017). With Gene M. Thorp, he is the co-author of The Tale Untwisted: George McClellan and the Discovery of Lee's Lost Orders, September 13, 1862 (2019).

== Education ==
From June until October 1999, as a PhD candidate at Syracuse University, Rossino held a Center for Advanced Holocaust Studies fellowship at the United States Holocaust Memorial Museum to study "German Soldiers, the Polish Campaign, and the Nazification of the Wehrmacht". He was awarded his PhD that year for a thesis entitled "September 1939: The German army and the invasion of Poland".

== Hitler Strikes Poland ==
The cover photograph for Hitler Strikes Poland shows German film director Leni Riefenstahl witnessing the murder of Jews in the town of Końskie in occupied Poland. Christopher Browning wrote: "Rossino’s fine study provides the 'missing link' between the traditional German expansionism of World War I and the 'war of annihilation' against the Soviet Union in 1941."

== Bibliography ==
=== Books ===
- (2003). Hitler Strikes Poland: Blitzkrieg, Ideology, and Atrocity. University Press of Kansas. ISBN 0-7006-1234-3
- (2017). Six Days in September: A Novel of Lee's Army in Maryland, 1862. El Dorado Hills, CA: Savas Beatie. ISBN 978-1611213980
- (2019) with Gene M. Thorp. The Tale Untwisted: George McClellan and the Discovery of Lee's Lost Orders, September 13, 1862. El Dorado Hills, CA: Savas Beatie.
- Their Maryland : the Army of Northern Virginia from the Potomac crossing to Sharpsburg in September 1862. Savas Beatie. 2021.

=== Articles ===
- (1997). "Destructive Impulses: German Soldiers and the Conquest of Poland". Holocaust and Genocide Studies. 11(3) (Winter): 351–364.
- (1999). "Eastern Europe Through German Eyes: Soldiers' Photographs 1939–42". History of Photography. 23(4) (Winter): 313–321.
- (2001). "Nazi Anti-Jewish Policy during the Polish Campaign: The Case of Einsatzgruppe von Woyrsch". German Studies Review. 24 (February): 37.
- (2003). "Polish 'Neighbors' and German Invaders: Contextualizing Anti-Jewish Violence in the Bialystok District during the Opening Weeks of Operation Barbarossa". Polin: Studies in Polish Jewry. 16: 431–452.
- (2003). "War of Extermination: The German Military in World War II, 1941–1944". Holocaust and Genocide Studies. 17(3) (Winter): 508–511.
- "Human collateral". America's Civil War. 35 (2): 50–53. May 2022.
