= Dariusz Stola =

Polish historian

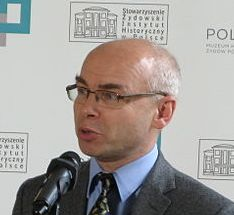
- Stola in 2014
- Born: Dariusz Jan Stola; December 11, 1963 (age 62); Warsaw, Poland

Dariusz Stola (born 1963) is a Polish historian and professor at the Institute of Political Studies of the Polish Academy of Sciences. His research focuses on the history of 20th-century Poland, the Holocaust, Jewish–Polish relations, and migration in Central and Eastern Europe. He served as director of the POLIN Museum of the History of Polish Jews in Warsaw from 2014 to 2019. Stola has published extensively on postwar Polish history, antisemitism, and communist-era migration policy, and has been an active participant in public debates concerning historical memory in Poland. In 2026, Stola was reappointed as Director of POLIN Museum of the History of Polish Jews.

== Career ==
Stola teaches modern history and studies 20th-century human migrations, the Holocaust, Polish-Jewish relations, and the history of postwar Poland's communist regime. From 2014 to 2019 he was director of the POLIN Museum of the History of Polish Jews. He is the author or co-author of seven books and over a hundred scholarly papers.

== POLIN Museum Tenure ==
As director of the POLIN Museum of the History of Polish Jews, Stola publicly criticized the 2018 amendment to the Act on the Institute of National Remembrance (IPN), adopted under Poland’s Law and Justice (PiS) government. The amendment introduced criminal penalties for publicly attributing responsibility for Nazi Germany’s Holocaust crimes to the Polish state or nation. The legislation prompted international criticism, with opponents (and Stola) arguing that it posed risks to free speech and academic freedom. The article framed it as Stola and his supporters believed the legislation could potentially lead to distortion of history.

Commentators associated the tensions betweena prolonged dispute between Stola and Poland’s Ministry of Culture with his criticism of the 2018 amendment to the Act on the Institute of National Remembrance, often referred to as the “Holocaust memory law,” as well as with a POLIN exhibition examining the state-sponsored antisemitic campaign of 1968, which some viewed as drawing parallels to contemporary antisemitism in Poland.

In 2019, Dariusz Stola stepped down as director of the POLIN Museum. In 2020, Stola withdrew his candidacy for a second term after Culture Minister Piotr Gliński declined to formally reappoint him despite his having won 11 of 15 votes in an open competition. Stola stated that his lawyers advised him that the refusal was unlawful. Stola and his supporters argued that the decision was politically motivated and linked to his opposition to the 2018 amendment to the Act on the Institute of National Remembrance and to a POLIN exhibition addressing the state-sponsored antisemitic campaign of 1968. The Ministry of Culture did not publicly provide a detailed explanation for its decision.

In a 2020 interview following his withdrawal from the directorship, Stola spoke out at what he described as efforts to promote an exclusively positive narrative of Polish history. He acknowledged Poland’s long tradition of Jewish life and periods of relative tolerance that attracted Jewish migration in earlier centuries but argued that a complete historical account must also address antisemitism, pogroms, and instances of collaboration during the German occupation. He said he could not accept what he viewed as an incomplete interpretation of the past, stating: “It’s the history with all the dark pages thrown away.”`

=== Reinstatement as Director of POLIN (2026) ===
In February 2026, Stola was reappointed director of the POLIN Museum of the History of Polish Jews in Warsaw, seven years after the Polish government declined to confirm his reappointment despite his winning a public competition for the role. His reinstatement by Marta Cienkowska, culture minister in the government of Donald Tusk was reported to be seen as a symbolic reversal of earlier political interference in cultural institutions. The news of Stola's reappointment was reported to be well received by the Jewish community and other groups in Poland. One of POLIN’s co-founders, the Association of the Jewish Historical Institute, stated, "We believe that the new term will be a time of further strengthening the Museum’s role as a place of dialogue, reflection and modern historical education." Stola described his return as “a victory of justice and the rule of law.”

== Recognition ==
Stola is a two-time recipient of the Polityka magazine award, and a recipient of the award of the Edward Raczyński Polish Foundation in London, England. Other honors include the Irene Sendler Award, presented annually by Taube Philanthropies to individuals recognized for preserving and revitalizing Poland’s Jewish heritage, as well as Poland’s Knight’s Cross of the Order of Polonia Restituta and the Gloria Artis Silver Medal for Merit to Culture.

== March of the Living ==
In May 2019, while serving as director of the POLIN Museum of the History of Polish Jews, Stola participated in the March of the Living from Auschwitz to Birkenau. He lit the first memorial torch in honor of the Righteous Among the Nations during the closing ceremony at Birkenau on Yom HaShoah.

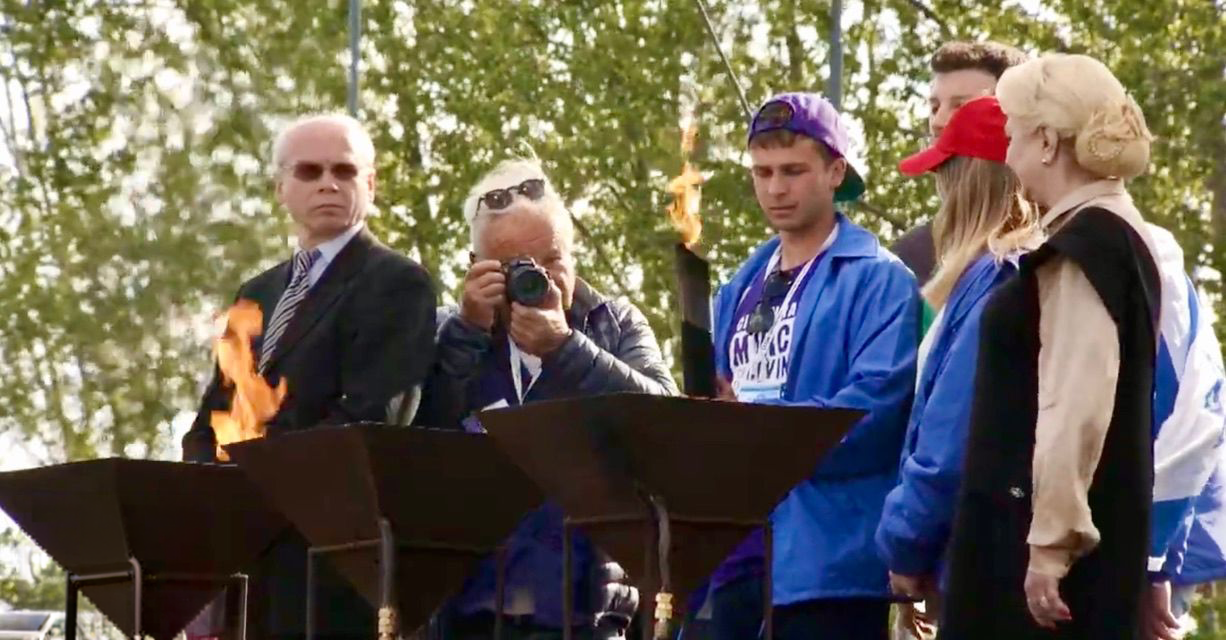
Dariusz Stola at the 2019 March of Living lit the first torch during the closing ceremony at Birkenau on Yom HaShoah, in honor of the Righteous Among the Nations. Viorica Dăncilă, on the right, Prime Minister of Romania and President of United Council.

Stola commented favourably on the evolving educational focus of the March of the Living, noting that in recent years participating groups have increasingly included visits to the POLIN Museum. He observed that the program has broadened its scope to incorporate the once-thriving history of Jewish life in Poland and Europe, rather than concentrating exclusively on the Holocaust. He wrote that this shift allows participants to encounter “a better presentation of the centuries-old history of Jews in Poland … so as not to focus solely on the Holocaust,” including visits to historic centres of Jewish culture such as Kraków’s Kazimierz, Tykocin, and Lublin.

Stola reviewed the March of the Living publication Witness: Passing the Torch of Holocaust Memory to New Generations, commending its portrayal of Holocaust survivors who continue to share their testimony with younger generations. He emphasized what he described as the moral resilience of the survivors featured in the volume, writing that “It is striking that, despite such terrible experiences and face-to-face contact with radical evil, many of them managed to keep faith in the possibility of victory for the good and perseverance in its preaching.”

== Selected works ==
- Kraj bez wyjścia? Migracje z Polski 1949-1989 (A Country with No Way Out? Migrations from Poland, 1949–1989), Warsaw, Institute of National Remembrance, 2010. Polityka Award for Best Historical Book of 2010.
- Historia (History). Textbook for secondary-school classes 2 (with J. Czubaty) and 3, Warsaw, 2009
- Co-author, Od Piłsudskiego do Wałęsy. Studia z dziejów Polski w XX wieku (From Piłsudski to Wałęsa: Studies in 20th-Century Polish History), Warsaw, 2008
- Złote lata PZPR: finanse partii w dekadzie Gierka (Golden Years of the Polish People's Republic: The Party's Finances during Gierek's Decade), Warsaw, 2008
- Co-author, PRL. Trwanie i zmiana (The Polish People's Republic: Endurance and Change), Warsaw, 2003
- Co-author, Patterns of Migration in Central Europe, New York, 2001
- Kampania antysyjonistyczna w Polsce 1967-1968 (The Anti-Zionist Campaign in Poland, 1967–1968), Warsaw, 2000
- Nadzieja i zagłada. Ignacy Schwarzbart – żydowski przedstawiciel w Radzie Narodowej RP, 1940-1945 (Hope and Destruction: Ignacy Schwarzbart, Jewish Representative in the Polish National Council, 1940–1945), Warsaw, 1995

== See also ==
- List of Poles
