= Joanna Michlic =

American historian

Joanna Beata Michlic
- Born: Łódź, Łódź Voivodeship, Poland
- Occupation: Historian

Academic background
- Education: PhD, University of London
- Thesis: Ethnic nationalism and the myth of the threatening other: The case of Poland and perceptions of its Jewish minority from the late nineteenth century to the modern period (2000)
- Academic advisors: John Klier, Anthony D. Smith

Academic work
- Era: The Holocaust in Poland; 1939–1945 Polish–Jewish relations
- Institutions: University College London
- Notable works: Neighbors Respond: The Controversy about Jedwabne (co-editor, 2003)
- Website: Joanna B Michlic publications on Academia.edu

Joanna Beata Michlic is a Polish social and cultural historian specializing in Polish-Jewish history and the Holocaust in Poland. An honorary senior research associate at the Centre for Collective Violence, Holocaust and Genocide Studies at University College London (UCL), she focuses in particular on the collective memory of traumatic events, particularly as it relates to gender and childhood.

Michlic is the author and editor of several books on Jewish-Polish relations and Jewish history, including Neighbors Respond: The Controversy about Jedwabne (edited with Antony Polonsky, 2003); Poland's Threatening Other: The Image of the Jew from 1880 to the Present (2006); and Jewish Families in Europe, 1939–Present: History, Representation, and Memory (2017).

== Education ==
Born in Łódź, Poland, Michlic received her bachelor's degree in Slavonic studies from the University of Łódź and her MA in modern European and Jewish history from the University of London. In 2000 she was awarded a PhD, also by the University of London, for a thesis entitled "Ethnic nationalism and the myth of the threatening other: The case of Poland and perceptions of its Jewish minority from the late nineteenth century to the modern period".

== Career ==
From July to September 2001, Michlic was a Charles H. Revson Foundation fellow at the United States Holocaust Memorial Museum, where she worked on "Children's Experience of the Holocaust: The Case of Polish Jewish Children". In 2001–2002 she was a research postdoctoral fellow at Yad Vashem, again studying children during the Holocaust and "The Sociological Reconstruction of Daily Life Experience".

Michlic joined Lehigh University as an associate professor of history, and served as chair of the Holocaust and Ethical Values Studies program. In 2008 she moved to the Hadassah-Brandeis Institute at Brandeis University, where in 2009 she became founder/director of the university's Project on Families, Children and the Holocaust. The aim of the project was to explore the history of East European Jewish families, and particularly children, from 1933 to the present. In 2013 she moved to Bristol University as a lecturer in contemporary history.

Michlic's essay collection, edited with John-Paul Himka, Bringing the Dark Past to Light. The Memory of the Holocaust in Postcommunist Europe (2013), discusses how the Holocaust is viewed in areas of Europe where most of it took place, rather than through the lens of the international "gatekeepers", the United States Holocaust Memorial Museum and Yad Vashem. She spoke out in 2018 against an amendment to Poland's Act on the Institute of National Remembrance, which made it a criminal offence (later demoted to civil offence) to violate the "good name" of Poland by accusing it of crimes committed by Germany during the Holocaust and Germany's occupation of Poland.

In 2014 Michlic studied for five months at the University of Haifa as a Fulbright Senior Scholar. Her research project was "More Than The Milk Of Human Kindness: Jewish Survivors and Their Polish Rescuers Recount Their Tales, 1944–1949". As part of that study, she examined unpublished correspondence between Jewish Holocaust survivors, rescuers and their families, and discussed the Polish myth of the "ungrateful Jew", a narrative that emerged in post-communist Poland. She found that, while many Jews broke off contact with their rescuers, they did so to protect the rescuers from the antisemitism rampant in Poland at the time, which might have led to retribution against the rescuers by their neighbors.

== Selected works ==
- (2002). Coming to Terms with the 'Dark Past': The Polish Debate about the Jedwabne Massacre". Jerusalem: Vidal Sassoon International Center for the Study of Antisemitism, The Hebrew University of Jerusalem.
- (2003) with Antony Polonsky, eds. Neighbors Respond: The Controversy about Jedwabne. Princeton: Princeton University Press. ISBN 0-691-11306-8
- (2006). Poland's Threatening Other: The Image of the Jew from 1880 to the Present. University of Nebraska Press. ISBN 0-8032-3240-3
- (2012). "The Aftermath and After: Memories of Child Survivors of the Holocaust". In Sara R. Horowitz, ed. Lessons and Legacies. Back to the Sources, Volume X. Reexamining Perpetrators, Victims, and Bystanders. Northwestern University Press, pp. 141–189.
- (2013) with John-Paul Himka, eds. Bringing the Dark Past to Light. The Memory of the Holocaust in Postcommunist Europe. Nebraska University Press.
- (2017). Jewish Families in Europe, 1939–Present: History, Representation, and Memory. Brandeis University Press. ISBN 978-1512600094
