= On Tyranny =

2017 book by Timothy Snyder

On Tyranny: Twenty Lessons from the Twentieth Century
- First UK edition (publ. Bodley Head)
- Author: Timothy Snyder
- Audio read by: Timothy Snyder
- Illustrator: Nora Krug (graphic edition)
- Language: English
- Subject: Politics, history
- Publisher: Tim Duggan Books (hardcover) / Penguin Random House (paperback)
- Publication date: February 28, 2017
- Publication place: United States
- Media type: Print (hardcover, paperback), e-book, audiobook
- Pages: 126
- ISBN: 978-0-8041-9011-4
- OCLC: 982489578
- Preceded by: Black Earth: The Holocaust as History and Warning
- Followed by: Our Malady: Lessons in Liberty from a Hospital Diary

On Tyranny: Twenty Lessons from the Twentieth Century is a 2017 book by Timothy Snyder, a historian of 20th-century Europe. The book was published by Tim Duggan Books in hardcover and by Penguin Random House in paperback. A graphic version, illustrated by Nora Krug, was released October 5, 2021. The book topped the New York Times bestseller list for paperback nonfiction in 2017 and remained on bestseller lists as late as 2021. As of July 2025, over 1.4 million copies of On Tyranny have been sold and the book is on its 47th printing.

On Tyranny focuses on the concept of tyranny in the context of the modern United States politics, analyzing what Snyder calls "America's turn towards authoritarianism." Explaining that "history does not repeat, but it does instruct," he analyzes 20th century Europe to identify conditions that can enable established democracies to transform into dictatorships. The 126-page-book is presented as a series of instructions on combating the rise of tyranny—such as "defend institutions," "remember professional ethics," and "believe in truth."

== Reviews ==
Carlos Lozada of The Washington Post describes the book as "clarifying and unnerving," "a memorable work that is grounded in history yet imbued with the fierce urgency of what now." Daniel W. Drezner, writing for The New York Times, says, "For such a small book, Snyder invests On Tyranny with considerable heft," but he also describes it as "overwrought" and tending toward hyperbole.

Tim Adams of The Guardian describes the work as "a 'how to' guide for resisting tyranny," concluding "You will read no more relevant field guide to that wisdom than this book." Richard Evans, also in The Guardian, writes that "Snyder provokes us to think again about major issues of our time, as well as significant elements of the past, but he seems to have rushed it out rather too quickly."

== 2024 U.S. elections ==
In his newsletter, Snyder encouraged people to start organizing well before the general elections in November 2024 to win both local and national elections. He noted that On Tyranny was written in a defensive mode and that if its lessons are heeded and implemented, things could get much better in 2025 for those who want to maintain democracy and the rule of law in the United States. Snyder contended that while Trump did not succeed in overturning the 2020 election, it was practice for a coup that Trump's supporters would be better prepared for in 2024. He also noted that in 2020 many influential individuals and institutions were aware that Trump would likely resist a peaceful transfer of power if he were not re-elected, and that they took measures to ensure that a lawful transfer did occur.
