= Timothy Snyder =

American historian (born 1969)

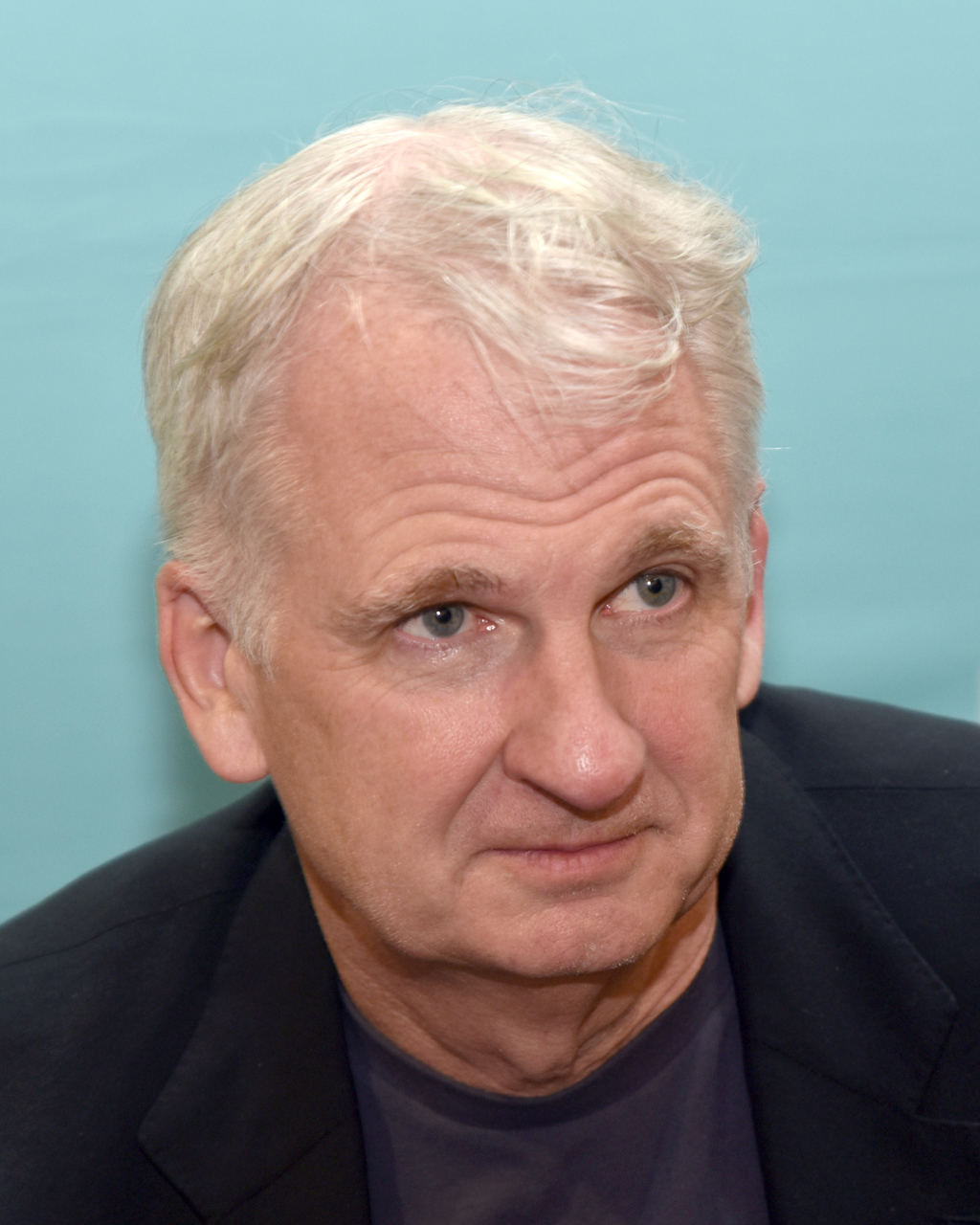
- Snyder in 2026
- Born: Timothy David Snyder; August 18, 1969 (age 57); Dayton, Ohio, U.S.
- Spouse: Marci Shore (m. 2005)
- Children: 2
- Awards: George Louis Beer Prize (2003); Hannah Arendt Prize (2013); The VIZE 97 Prize (2015)

Academic background
- Education: Brown University (BA); Balliol College, Oxford (DPhil)
- Thesis: Kazimierz Kelles-Krauz (1872–1905): A Political and Intellectual Biography (1995)
- Doctoral advisor: Timothy Garton Ash; Jerzy Jedlicki
- Other advisor: Charles Feinstein

Academic work
- Sub-discipline: History of Central and Eastern Europe, the Soviet Union, and the Holocaust
- Institutions: Yale University; London School of Economics; College of Europe; University of Toronto

Timothy David Snyder (born August 18, 1969) is an American historian specializing in the history of Central and Eastern Europe, the Soviet Union, and the Holocaust. He holds the inaugural Chair in Modern European History, supported by the Temerty Endowment for Ukrainian Studies, at the Munk School of Global Affairs and Public Policy at the University of Toronto. From 2017 to 2025 he was the Richard C. Levin Professor of History at Yale University.

He is a permanent fellow at the Institute for Human Sciences in Vienna. Snyder serves on the Committee on Conscience of the United States Holocaust Memorial Museum, and is a member of the Council on Foreign Relations.

Snyder has written many books, including Bloodlands: Europe Between Hitler and Stalin (2010), On Tyranny: Twenty Lessons from the Twentieth Century (2017), The Road to Unfreedom (2018), and Our Malady (2020). Several of these have been described as best-sellers.

== Early life and education ==
Timothy Snyder was born in 1969 near Dayton, Ohio; he is the son of Christine Hadley Snyder, a teacher, accountant, and homemaker, and Estel Eugene Snyder, a veterinarian. Snyder's parents were married in a Quaker ceremony in 1963 in Ohio, and his mother was active in preserving her family farmstead as a Quaker historic site. They had served in the Peace Corps in the Dominican Republic and El Salvador before starting their family in a prosperous suburb of Dayton. While in ninth grade, Snyder holidayed with them in a Quaker dairy commune in Costa Rica. He acknowledges having received a Quaker education.

Snyder attended Centerville High School. He received a Bachelor of Arts degree in history and political science from Brown University in 1991, and was influenced to take up European history by Mary Gluck and Thomas W. Simons Jr., who was soon to become US ambassador to Poland. He earned a D.Phil. degree in modern history in 1995 at the University of Oxford with a thesis on the Polish Marxist Kazimierz Kelles-Krauz, supervised by Timothy Garton Ash and Polish Academy of Sciences' Jerzy Jedlicki. He was a Marshall Scholar at Balliol College, Oxford, from 1991 to 1994.

== Career ==
Snyder held fellowships at the French National Centre for Scientific Research in Paris from 1994 to 1995; the Institut für die Wissenschaften vom Menschen in Vienna in 1996; and the Olin Institute for Strategic Studies at Harvard University in 1997. He was an Academy Scholar at the Weatherhead Center for International Affairs at Harvard University from 1998 to 2001. He joined the faculty of Yale University in 2001.

His seminal, breakthrough work Bloodlands—a study of civilian mass killings in Eastern Europe during the Second World War—was published in 2010. The work is considered to be an opening into an expanded field of research in this territory.

Snyder has been an instructor at the College of Europe Natolin Campus, the Baron Velge Chair at the Université libre de Bruxelles, the Cleveringa Chair at the Leiden University, Philippe Romain Chair at the London School of Economics, and the 2013 René Girard Lecturer at Stanford University. During the 2013–14 academic year, he held the Philippe Roman Chair of International History at the London School of Economics and Political Science. Before assuming the Richard C. Levin Professorship of History at Yale in 2017, Snyder was the Bird White Housum Professor of History at Yale University.

Following the Maidan Revolution and Russian annexation of Crimea, he co-organised the Ukraine: Thinking Together conference in Kyiv in May 2014 with Leon Wieseltier of The New Republic (then majority-owned by Facebook's co-founder Chris Hughes). He has participated in the Yalta European Strategy meetings in Kyiv since September 2014 (during his September 2022 visit to the conference, he held a two-hour private meeting with the Ukrainian president Volodymyr Zelenskyy). In November 2014, he attended the Ukrainian oligarch Victor Pinchuk's decoration with the Metropolitan Andrey Sheptytsky Medal by the Jewish Confederation of Ukraine in Kyiv. In January 2019, he addressed the initial Ukraine House Davos event (sponsored by Pinchuk and the Ukrainian-Canadian billionaire James C. Temerty) at the annual World Economic Forum meeting in Davos.

His 2018 book, The Road to Unfreedom, covers the beginning phase of the war in Ukraine in tandem with meditations on the Putin regime, and the newly inaugurated Trump Regime. The work builds on his best-selling pamphlet (written and released immediately after Trump’s inauguration) On Tyranny. Both works rapidly became influential best-sellers.

He is a member of the Committee on Conscience of the United States Holocaust Memorial Museum. On September 25, 2020, he was named as one of 25 members of the Real Facebook Oversight Board, an independent group monitoring Facebook. In addition, he serves on the editorial boards of the Journal of Modern European History and East European Politics and Societies.

In November 2023, he launched a deep history project named Ukrainian History Global Initiative, conceived and funded by Victor Pinchuk. He joined the Initiative's board of trustees (chaired by Carl Bildt) and chairs its academic council featuring Timothy Garton Ash and Yuval Harari. He was selected as the keynote speaker for the Friends Committee on National Legislation annual meeting in 2025.

In July 2025, he assumed the Chair in Modern European History at Munk School of Global Affairs and Public Policy at the University of Toronto, funded by the Temerty Family Foundation.

== Works ==
Snyder has written sixteen books and co-edited two. He reads ten European languages, and speaks five. Snyder has stressed that knowing other languages is essential for his field, saying "If you don't know Russian, you don't really know what you're missing."

=== Early works ===
Snyder's first book was the 1998 Nationalism, Marxism, and Modern Central Europe: A Biography of Kazimierz Kelles-Krauz. It is a study in nationalism through analysis of the life of the Polish thinker Kazimierz Kelles-Krauz.

In 2003, he published The Reconstruction of Nations: Poland, Ukraine, Lithuania, Belarus, 1569–1999. The book focuses on the history of several Central and Eastern European countries during the last few centuries.

In 2005, Snyder published the book Sketches from a Secret War: A Polish Artist's Mission to Liberate Soviet Ukraine. It is a study of the Second Polish Republic and Soviet Ukraine between World War I and World War II, as seen through the prism of the life of Henryk Józewski.

In 2008, he published The Red Prince: The Secret Lives of a Habsburg Archduke. The book is an analysis of the life of Wilhelm von Habsburg.

=== Bloodlands ===
In 2010, Snyder published the book Bloodlands: Europe Between Hitler and Stalin. It was a best seller and has been translated into thirty languages. In an interview with Slovene historian Luka Lisjak Gabrijelčič in 2016, Snyder described the book as an attempt to overcome the limitations of national history in explaining the political crimes perpetrated in Eastern Europe during the 1930s and 1940s:

The point of Bloodlands was that we hadn't noticed a major event in European history: the fact 13 million civilians were murdered for political reasons in a rather confined space over a short period of time. The question of the book was: 'How this could have happened?' We have some history of Soviet terror, of the Holocaust, of the Ukrainian famine, of the German reprisals against the civilians. But all of these crimes happened in the same places in a short time span, so why not treat them as a single event and see if they can be unified under a meaningful narrative.

Bloodlands received reviews ranging from highly critical to "rapturous". In assessing these reviews, Jacques Sémelin described it as one of the books that "change the way we look at a period in history". Sémelin noted that some historians have criticized the chronological construction of events, the arbitrary geographical delimitation, Snyder's numbers on victims and violence, and a lack of focus on interactions between different actors.

Omer Bartov wrote that "the book presents no new evidence and makes no new arguments". In a highly critical review, Richard Evans wrote that, because of its lack of causal argument, "Snyder's book is of no use"; Evans also wrote that Snyder "hasn't really mastered the voluminous literature on Hitler's Germany", which "leads him into error in a number of places" about the politics of Nazi Germany.

By contrast, Wendy Lower wrote that it was a "masterful synthesis"; John Connelly called it "morally informed scholarship of the highest calibre"; and Christopher Browning described it as "stunning". The journal Contemporary European History published a special forum on the book in 2012, featuring reviews by Mark Mazower, Dan Diner, Thomas Kühne, and Jörg Baberowski, with an introduction and response by Snyder.

=== Later works ===
Snyder's 2012 book, Thinking the Twentieth Century, was co-authored with Tony Judt, while Judt was in the late stages of ALS disease. The book is based primarily on material by Judt, as edited by Snyder. It presents Judt's view on the history of the twentieth century.

Snyder published Black Earth: The Holocaust as History and Warning in 2015. The book offered a "radically new explanation" of the Holocaust and received mixed reviews.

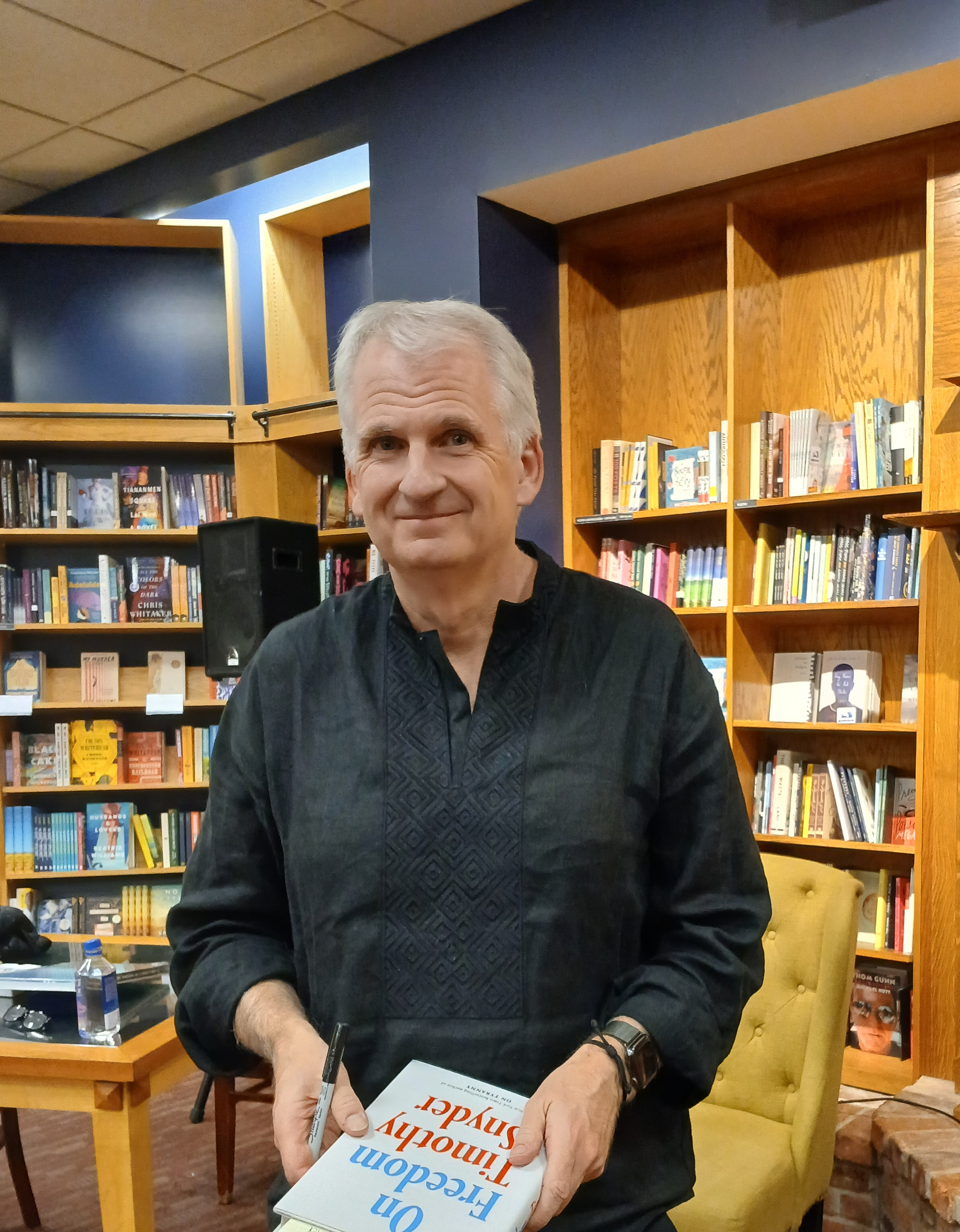
Timothy Snyder in conversation with Stephen Norris discussing and signing On Freedom, Cincinnati, October 2024

In 2017, he published On Tyranny: Twenty Lessons from the Twentieth Century, a short book about how to prevent a democracy from becoming a tyranny; the book focused on modern United States politics and on what he called "America's turn towards authoritarianism". The book topped The New York Times Best Seller list for paperback nonfiction in 2017, and it remained on bestseller lists as late as 2021. On Tyranny has been featured in a rap song and in poster exhibitions.

In 2018, he published The Road to Unfreedom: Russia, Europe, America. The book explores Russian attempts to influence Western democracies; the book also explores the influence of philosopher Ivan Ilyin on Russian President Vladimir Putin and the Russian Federation in general.

In 2020, he published a book on the American health care system, called Our Malady.

In 2024, he published On Freedom, a book on how the concept of freedom has been misunderstood and must be redefined.

Snyder has contributed essays to publications including International Herald Tribune, The Nation, Foreign Affairs, New York Review of Books, The New York Times, The Times Literary Supplement, The New Republic, Eurozine, Tygodnik Powszechny, Chicago Tribune, and The Christian Science Monitor.

On February 24, 2026, Snyder used his Substack platform publication, Thinking About..., to explore his interest in the local and state factors in US national issues, as exemplified by an interview of David Pepper, a newly-declared candidate in a 2026 state lieutenant governor race on a ticket for the candidacy of Amy Acton for governor of Ohio. The influence of long-term political strategists shaping local legislation that would affect national focus on issues is explored in the interview by the two native Ohioans who also engage in dialogue about history, both local and national, and national issues in the United States.

== Views ==
Snyder is primarily a scholar of twentieth-century Eastern European history; but in the mid-2010s, he became interested in U.S. history, contemporary politics, international relations, digital politics, health, and education. He has commented on the defunding of departments of history and the humanities since the supposed post-Soviet end of history, noting that this has led to a society without the "concepts and references" or structural tools to discuss eroding factors such as modern forms of populism.

In interviews with The Guardian for the article "Putin, Trump, Ukraine: how Timothy Snyder became the leading interpreter of our dark times", Snyder described history as follows: "a constant, exciting discovery of things that actually happened, which weren't anticipated and which were probably considered wildly improbable at the time. (...) And once you know that, then you can have the intuition that, well, maybe in this moment right now there's something happening which people aren't seeing." Drawing on the lessons of European history, Snyder introduced two terms into American political discussion: big lie, in reference to Donald Trump's false claim that he won the 2020 election; and memory laws, to describe Republican state legislators' bills that were designed to guide and control American understanding of the past, in some cases affirming free speech while banning divisive speech.

His political views have been described as "difficult to pin down". Masha Gessen, Tony Judt, Henry Kissinger, Gary Kasparov, Anne Appelbaum and others are among the authors of blurbs praising his books.

=== Views on Russia ===
External videos
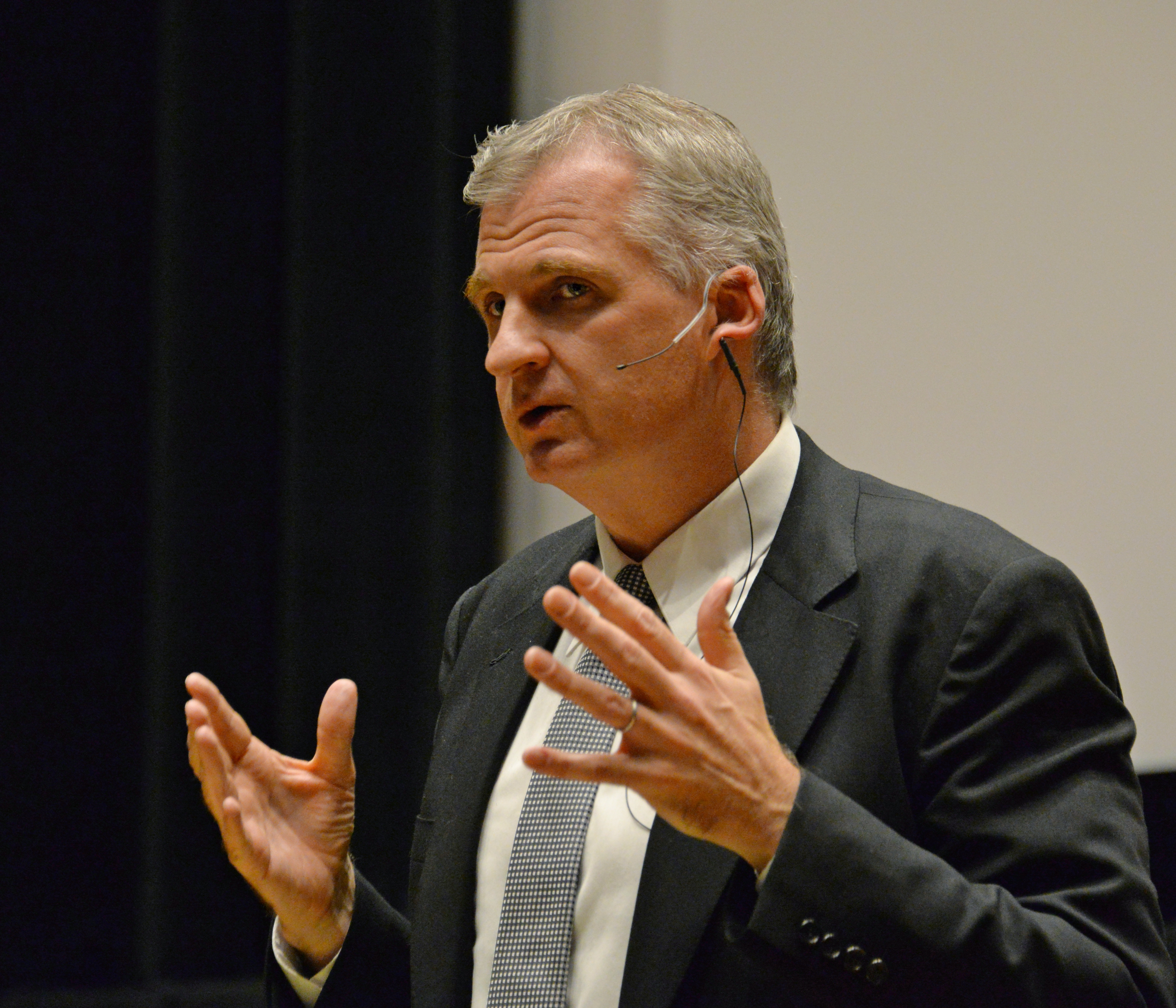
- Ukraine: From Propaganda to Reality, Chicago Humanities Festival, 57:35, November 14, 2014

Since Russia's invasion of Ukraine, and the bombing of its energy infrastructure, Snyder has spoken and written widely on related subjects: the history of Ukraine and its worldwide importance for democracy; the disastrous geopolitical effects of the invasion; and the need for other nations and individuals to stand up for the protection of territory belonging to Ukraine.

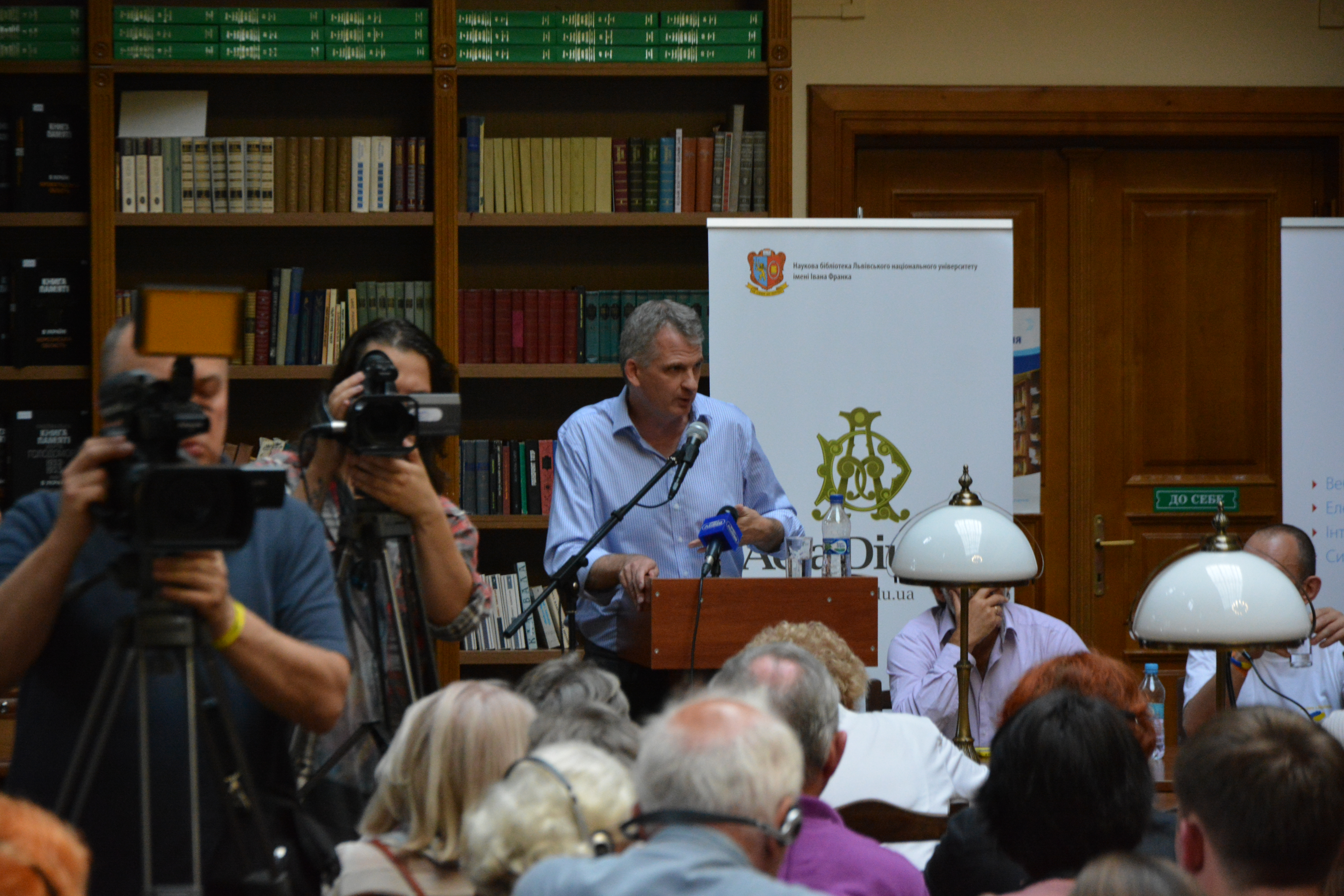
Snyder in Ukraine, September 2014

Snyder launched a $1.25 million crowdfunding initiative to upgrade Ukraine's air defenses. According to Snyder, the only way to end the war is for Russia to "win by losing" and admit defeat. Snyder claims that a withdrawal from Ukraine will result in Putin's removal and another democratization of Russia. Snyder is on the list of 200 Americans who are barred from entering Russian territory, under sanctions announced by the Russian government in November 2022.

In The Road to Unfreedom, Snyder argues that Vladimir Putin's government in Russia is authoritarian, and that it uses fascist ideas in its rhetoric. In December 2018, during a discussion with John Connelly, Snyder referred to this as "schizo-fascism":

... fascist ideas have come to Russia at a historical moment, three generations after the Second World War, when it's impossible for Russians to think of themselves as fascist. The entire meaning of the war in Soviet education was as an anti-fascist struggle, where the Russians are on the side of the good and the fascists are the enemy. So there's this odd business, which I call in the book "schizo-fascism", where people who are themselves unambiguously fascists refer to others as fascists.

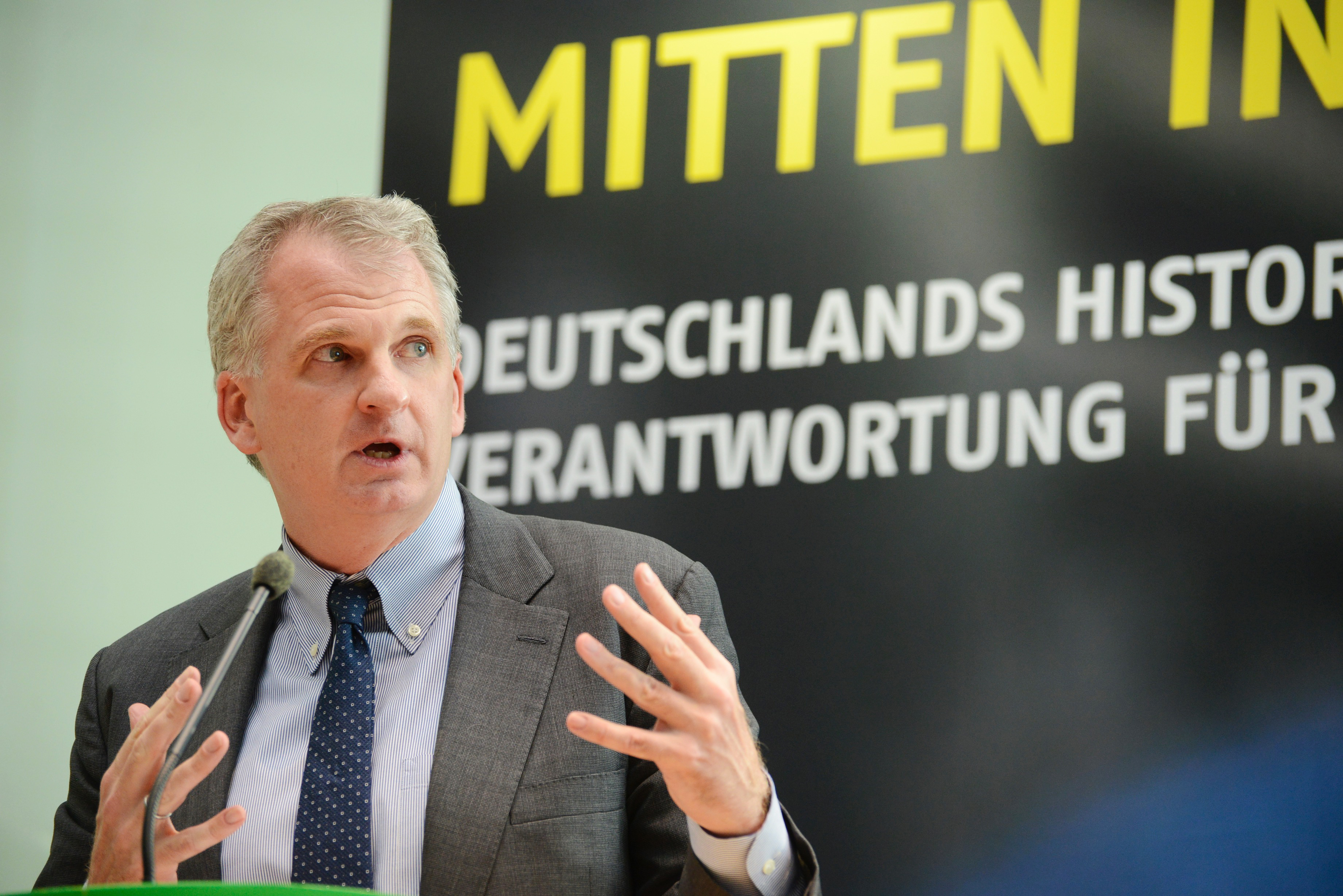
On June 20, 2017, a discussion on Germany's historical responsibility toward Ukraine was held in the German Parliament.

Snyder has drawn a parallel between Hitler's and Putin's rationales for territorial expansion. Snyder predicted Russia's invasion of Crimea, outlining specific threats in the New York Times opinion piece "Don't Let Putin Grab Ukraine" on February 3, 2014. Snyder wrote that Putin's rhetoric resembles Hitler's to the point of plagiarism: both claimed that a neighboring democracy was somehow tyrannical; both appealed to imaginary violations of minority rights as a reason to invade; and both argued that a neighboring nation did not really exist and that its state was illegitimate.

Marlène Laruelle commented that "Contrary to [Snyder's] claims, the Kremlin does not live in an ideological world inspired by Nazi Germany, but in one in which the Yalta decades, the Gorbachev-Yeltsin years, and the collapse of the Soviet Union still constitute the main historical referents and traumas."

On March 14, 2023, Snyder briefed the United Nations Security Council in a meeting called by Russia to address Russophobia. Snyder said that the term Russophobia was used by Russia to justify its war crimes in Ukraine. He stated that any harm done to Russians and Russian culture was primarily due to Moscow's own policies and actions; these resulted in driving Russian emigration following the invasion, suppression of independent media, attacks on cultural assets and landmarks, and mass killings of Russian speakers and citizens. After he was challenged by the Russian representative, Vasily Nebenzya, for sources, Snyder referred to Putin's statements denying the existence of Ukraine.

=== Views on Ukraine ===
Snyder has written six books on Ukraine. In 2022, to explain the origins and course of the Russo-Ukrainian war, he made his Yale lecture series The Making of Modern Ukraine available to the general public on YouTube and as a podcast series, along with the syllabus and reading list. As of November 2022, the course had been viewed by millions of people. Snyder has spoken and written about the war in the press, and he publishes history and commentary in the online newsletter "Thinking About..."

Olena Zelenska, First Lady of Ukraine, met with Snyder to discuss the mental health and resilience of Ukrainians at the annual Yalta European Strategy conference in September 2023.

=== Democratic backsliding in the United States ===
Snyder criticized "Restoring Truth and Sanity to American History", a presidential executive order signed on March 27, 2025, as asserting the government's monopoly on truth, while identifying all other information as ideology or propaganda. Snyder stated that "The truth is never, never with those who hold power. The truth is with everyone else." He cites "the need for memory and for discussion of events that make us uncomfortable — as good history always will." "Loving our country means knowing about our country. And knowing about our country means learning the things that we don't know, and sometimes the things that we don't want to know."

Snyder has been critical of the Second Trump Administration's approach to the Russo-Ukrainian war, claiming that Americans are "negotiating on the side of aggressors". In Snyder's view, Ukraine is the victim of a colonial war in which theft of resources, including children, is the goal. He mentions the Munich accords of 1938, the Molotov-Ribbentrop pact of 1939, and the broader history of colonialism as precedents for excluding Ukraine from talks that represent an attack on its sovereignty.

On February 5, 2025, Timothy Snyder said of Elon Musk's attempt to seize control of the U.S. Treasury system that "of course it's a coup". Snyder claimed that breaking into the government computer systems has the same purpose as armed assaults on government centers of power.

Snyder has described Trump as Russia's "only chance of winning the war", describing their thought process as "We just need to stay on the battlefield to January 20, 2025 and then the floodgates will open for us, because we're going to have our guy." Snyder claimed that the U.S. Supreme Court cleared the way for Trump's return through "laughable" rulings on immunity and on the US Constitution's third section of the Fourteenth Amendment disqualifying insurrectionists from federal office.

In the first chapter of his book On Tyranny, Snyder elaborates on vorauseilender Gehorsam, "obedience ahead of the command", or as Snyder calls it, "anticipatory obedience". The concept dates from Germany in 1933. Snyder's formulation of anticipatory obedience and the phrase "do not obey in advance" has become a common part of discourse during the Second Trump Administration.

In response to a request from the United States House Committee on Oversight and Accountability, Timothy Snyder provided written and oral testimony for the April 17, 2024, session: "Defending America from the Chinese Communist Party's Political Warfare, Part I." Snyder urged Congress to understand political warfare as "someone else trying to get you to do something you ought not to". He emphasized the role Americans play in the efforts of hostile foreign powers to exploit domestic weaknesses using "divisive propaganda" intended to show that "democracy is impotent, hypocritical, and not worth defending".

Snyder argued the centrality of the war in Ukraine to the general problem of political warfare. According to Snyder, "international order, the reputation of democracy and alliance structures are all at stake". He describes Chinese and Russian propaganda methods as designed to promote American inaction and interfere with elections, backing candidates most likely to support authoritarian regimes.

In written testimony and during the oral hearings, Snyder and members of Congress gave examples of Marjorie Taylor Greene, JD Vance, and Trump publicly promoting foreign propaganda tropes. Snyder responded to Greene's oral testimony suggesting significant Nazi influence in Ukraine, stating that no far-right party in Ukraine has ever gotten more than 3% of a national vote.

Elaborating in 2021 on the resonance of Nazi history within Trump's claim to a landslide victory, Snyder recalled the German Reich's "stab in the back" lie that its army did not really lose the First World War, but rather, Jews and left-wingers betrayed "true Germans" on the home front, leading to defeat. This lie, when repeated and expanded by Hitler to a claim that Jews were responsible for everything that is wrong, fueled anti-Semitism and led to the Holocaust.

According to Snyder, Trump's attempts to overturn the 2020 United States presidential election "tears the very fabric of factuality", by "denying verifiable reality" and forcing believers to accept the premise that Democrats rigged the 2020 election only for the presidency and not for members of Congress. It requires adoption of a conspiracy theory in which everyone is against the believer, and the high stakes of the lie demand action including violence.

In January 2021 Snyder published an essay in The New York Times on the future of the GOP in response to the 2021 storming of the United States Capitol, blaming Trump and his "enablers", Senators Ted Cruz and Josh Hawley, for the insurrection fueled by their false claims of election fraud, writing that "the breakers have an even stronger reason to see Trump disappear: It is impossible to inherit from someone who is still around. Seizing Trump's big lie might appear to be a gesture of support. In fact, he observed, a big lie can survive the liar, and in the case of Cruz and Hawley, it expresses a wish for Trump's political death."

In a May 2017 interview with Salon, he warned that the Trump administration would attempt to subvert democracy by declaring a state of emergency and take full control of the government, similar to Hitler's Reichstag fire: "it's pretty much inevitable that they will try". He repeated the warning in Commonweal on November 2, 2020: "The plan is not to win the popular (or even the electoral) vote, but rather to stay in power some other way." According to Snyder, Trump's 2016 campaign for president of the United States "was basically a Russian operation."

== Personal life ==
In 1994, Snyder married fellow academic Milada Vachudova, with whom he also collaborated on scholarly work. Snyder's second marriage took place in 2005 to Marci Shore, a professor of European cultural and intellectual history at Yale University. The couple have two children together.

In December 2019, Snyder fell seriously ill following a series of medical misdiagnoses. While recuperating during the coronavirus pandemic, he wrote Our Malady: Lessons in Liberty from a Hospital Diary, about problems with the for-profit health care system in the US, and the coronavirus response to date.

Snyder and his wife moved from the United States to Canada in the summer of 2024 because of "difficult family matters." Shore wrote that their children were factors in the couple's decision. A spokesperson for Snyder said he made his decision for personal reasons, and he made it before the election. In an emailed statement Wednesday, Snyder said, "The opportunity came at a time when my spouse and I had to address some difficult family matters....aside from a strong appreciation of what U of T has to offer, the motivations are largely that—personal."

Some media reported that he, like his close friend Jason Stanley, was fleeing the perceived fascism of President Trump; as he wrote, "I did not leave Yale because of anything Trump is doing; the chronology and the psychology are all wrong; I was not and am not fleeing anything."

He is a friend of the Ukrainian rock star Sviatoslav Vakarchuk.

== Efforts in support of Ukraine ==
On November 2, 2022, Timothy Snyder became the tenth ambassador of the UNITED24 fundraising platform; he completed a fundraiser for a system to counter Russian unmanned aerial vehicles in Ukraine, thereby protecting Ukraine's critical infrastructure. On August 18, 2024, Snyder and Mark Hamill jointly launched the United24 Safe Terrain Initiative; this funded mine-clearing robots to remove explosive ordnance from Ukrainian land, reduce risks for sappers, and allow people to return to their businesses and farms.

Through the Institute for Human Sciences in Vienna, Austria, he leads the Documenting Ukraine project; this supports journalists, scholars, artists, public intellectuals, and archivists based in Ukraine in their efforts to create a factual record of the war.

Starting in November 2023, Snyder began leading 90 scholars in the Ukrainian History Global Initiative to study Ukraine and its history. The initiative is a charitable foundation that will include disciplines beyond history; it will sponsor three major academic conferences, various publications, and archaeological excavations.

== Awards ==
- 2025 American Philosophical Society Membership
- 2024 Pell Center Prize for Story in the Public Square, Salve Regina University
- 2024 Transatlantic Bridge Award of the Delegation of the European Union to the United States
- 2023 Medal of the Learned Society of the Czech Republic
- 2023 The Robert B. Silvers Prize for Journalism (Silvers-Dudley Prize)
- 2022 All European Academies Madame de Staël Prize
- 2019 Polish Academy of Learning Membership
- 2018 Prize of the Foundation for Polish Science
- 2016 Gustav Ranis International History Prize
- 2016 Gazeta Wyborcza Man of the Year
- 2015 The VIZE 97 Prize from the Václav Havel Foundation
- 2015 Carnegie Fellowship
- 2014 Antonovych prize
- 2013 Hannah Arendt Prize for Political Thought for Bloodlands: Europe Between Hitler and Stalin
- 2013 Le Prix du livre d'Histoire de l'Europe
- 2012 Prakhin International Literary Award for the Truth about Holocaust and Stalinist Repression Honorary Mention for Bloodlands: Europe Between Hitler and Stalin
- 2012 Kazimierz Moczarski History Prize for Bloodlands: Europe Between Hitler and Stalin
- 2012 Leipzig Book Award for European Understanding
- 2012 Literature Award from the American Academy of Arts and Letters
- 2012 Wacław Jędrzejewicz History Medal from the Józef Piłsudski Institute of America
- 2011 Ralph Waldo Emerson Award by Phi Beta Kappa society
- 2008–2009, 2004 American Association for Ukrainian Studies Book Prize
- 2003 Guggenheim Fellowship
- 2003 George Louis Beer Prize for The Reconstruction of Nations: Poland, Ukraine, Lithuania, Belarus, 1569–1999
- 2003 Przegląd Wschodni (Eastern Review) Best Foreign Academic Book
- 1998 The Oskar Halecki Polish History Award from the Polish Institute of Arts and Sciences in America

State Decorations and Orders

- Star of Lithuanian Diplomacy
- Commander's Cross of the Order for Merits to Lithuania
- Polish Bene Merito honorary badge
- Officer's Cross of the Order of Merit of the Republic of Poland
- Czech Medal of Merit
- Estonian Order of the Cross of Terra Mariana Class III
- Austrian Decoration for Science and Art, Republic of Austria

Honorary Doctorates

- Oxford University
- Brown University
- National University of Kharkiv (Karazin)
- Ukrainian Free University
- Lund University, Faculty of Humanities
- Maria Curie-Skłodowska University (UMCS), Lublin

== Selected works ==
- Nationalism, Marxism, and Modern Central Europe: A Biography of Kazimierz Kelles-Krauz. Harvard University Press, 1998. ISBN 978-0-19-084608-4
- Wall Around the West: State Power and Immigration Controls in Europe and North America. Rowman and Littlefield, 2000. Co-edited with Peter Andreas. ISBN 978-0-7425-0178-2
- The Reconstruction of Nations: Poland, Ukraine, Lithuania, Belarus, 1569–1999. Yale University Press, 2003. ISBN 978-0-300-09569-2
- Sketches from a Secret War: A Polish Artist's Mission to Liberate Soviet Ukraine. Yale University Press, 2005. ISBN 978-0-300-12599-3
- The Red Prince: The Secret Lives of a Habsburg Archduke. Basic Books, 2008. ISBN 978-0-465-01897-0
- Bloodlands: Europe Between Hitler and Stalin. New York: Basic Books. 2010. ISBN 978-0-465-03147-4.
- Thinking the Twentieth Century with Tony Judt. Penguin, 2012. ISBN 978-0-14-312304-0
- Stalin and Europe: Imitation and Domination, 1928–1953. Oxford University Press, 2014. Co-edited with Ray Brandon. ISBN 978-0199945580
- Black Earth: The Holocaust as History and Warning. Penguin, 2015. ISBN 978-1-101-90347-6
- On Tyranny: Twenty Lessons from the Twentieth Century. Penguin, 2017. ISBN 978-0-8041-9011-4
  - On Tyranny Graphic Edition: Twenty Lessons from the Twentieth Century. Ten Speed Press. ISBN 978-1-9848-5915-0
- The Road to Unfreedom: Russia, Europe, America. Penguin, 2018. ISBN 978-0-525-57447-7
- Our Malady: Lessons in Liberty from a Hospital Diary. Penguin, 2020. ISBN 978-0-593-23889-9
- On Freedom. Crown, 2024. ISBN 978-0-593-72872-7
