= Nationalism, Marxism, and Modern Central Europe =

Nationalism, Marxism, and Modern Central Europe: A Biography of Kazimierz Kelles-Krauz is a 1998 book by Timothy Snyder. It is a biography of Kazimierz Kelles-Krauz with commentary by Snyder on a number of wider issues, including nationalism.

The book was the winner of the Oskar Halecki Book Prize for Polish and East European History from the Polish Institute of Arts and Sciences in America.
