= Past Imperfect: French Intellectuals, 1944–1956 =

1992 book by Tony Judt

- 1992 Book jacket
- Author: Tony Judt
- Subject: Intellectuals—Political activity—France—History—20th century. Communism and intellectuals—France—History—20th century. France—Intellectual life—20th century.
- Genre: Non-fiction
- Set in: France, Soviet Union
- Published: 1992
- Publisher: University of California Press, New York University Press
- Publication place: U.S.A.
- Pages: 348
- ISBN: 978-0-520-07921-2 052-0-079-213
- OCLC: 802743992
- Dewey Decimal: 944.082
- LC Class: DC33.7 .J84 1992
- Website: Official website

Past Imperfect: French Intellectuals, 1944–1956 is a nonfiction book written by Tony Judt and was originally published by University of California Press in 1992. On page 11, Judt describes this book as, "an essay on intellectual irresponsibility, a study of the moral condition of the intelligentsia in postwar France."

This book is currently published by the New York University Press.

== Synopsis ==
In Past Imperfect: French Intellectuals, 1944–1956, Judt moved away from social history toward intellectual history, and from the endorsement of French Left and Marxist traditions to their critique. In Past Imperfect, he castigated French intellectuals of the postwar era, above all Jean-Paul Sartre, for their "self-imposed moral amnesia". Judt criticized what he considered blind faith in Joseph Stalin's communism. In Judt's reading, French thinkers such as Sartre were blinded by their own provincialism, and unable to see that their calls for intellectual authenticity should have required them to interrogate their own attachment to communism and criticize the Soviet Union for its policies in postwar eastern Europe.

== Reception ==
According to David L. Schalk, contributing to The American Historical Review, this book received a "laudatory front-page review in The New York Times Book Review." Jean-Francois Sirinelli, a respected professional historian, reviewed this book for the French publication Le Monde and found it deserving of praise.

William Grimes of The New York Times writes: "[Past Imperfect]" is fluidly written, with a strong narrative drive and an insistent, polemical edge..." Also, he writes that this book and another that Judt wrote, The Burden of Responsibility "...established Mr. Judt as a historian whose ability to see the present in the past gave his work an unusual air of immediacy."

== See also ==
- Jean-Paul Sartre
- Emmanuel Mounier
- Hammer and Rifle
