= Postwar: A History of Europe Since 1945 =

Non-fiction book by Tony Judt

- Cover of 1st edition
- Author: Tony Judt
- Language: English
- Subject: European history
- Genre: Non-fiction
- Publisher: Penguin Press
- Publication date: 6 October 2005
- Publication place: United Kingdom
- Media type: Print
- Pages: 878 (1st ed.)
- ISBN: 978-1-594-20065-6

Postwar: A History of Europe Since 1945 is a 2005 non-fiction book written by British historian Tony Judt examining the six decades of European history from the end of World War II in Europe in 1945 to 2005. Postwar is widely considered one of the foremost accounts of contemporary European history, particularly with regard to the history of Eastern Europe. It has been translated into French, Spanish and German.

Although it was published in 2005, Postwar had been in development since 1989.

== Background ==
After completing his doctorate, Judt taught modern French history at King's College, Cambridge from 1972 until 1978. Judt has called this an important period of his academic development and particularly credited historian John Dunn as an influence. He subsequently taught politics at St Anne's College, Oxford until 1987, when he moved to New York University, where he taught history again. In 1995, he founded the Remarque Institute of NYU. At this time, Judt was considered an "obscure British historian".

Judt decided to write Postwar in 1989 while waiting for a train at Vienna central station, inspired at least in part by having witnessed the Velvet Revolution in Czechoslovakia. It had been considered difficult to write a history of the Soviet Union (and Eastern Europe) until then due to lack of access to national archives, but the dissolution of the Soviet Union indicated that this may change in the foreseeable future.

== Synopsis ==
Postwar is divided into four major parts: "Post-war", covering 1945–1953; "Prosperity and Its Discontents", covering 1953–1971; "Recessional", covering 1971–1989; and "After the Fall", covering 1989–2005. The book's structure is primarily chronological, with Judt covering events and developments in the context of their time.

Judt first presents the immediate aftermath of World War II, with Europe as a "battered, broken, helpless continent". The second part of Postwar follows the development of Europe into socio-economic stability and eventual prosperity, with a focus on European integration. Judt argues that the conditions for this development were created by World War II, both in practical and ideological terms. The socio-political stability of postwar Europe was, according to Judt, only possible because "thanks to war, occupation, boundary adjustments, expulsions, and genocide, almost everybody now lived in their own country, among their own people." According to Judt, this is also when the European Model of government and society first emerges, characterised by welfare protections, public funding for education and healthcare, and a rejection of violence as a legitimate means of political transformation. In its third part, Postwar highlights the stability of the European continent in the face of economic downturn and later examines the dissolution of the Soviet Union, again through the perspective of how that dissolution was affected by the values and influences of the "European Model". In the final part, Judt argues that many of the concerns occupying Europe immediately after World War II have dissipated, particularly fears of German militarisation. He provides a detailed history of the rebuilding of formerly communist countries in Eastern Europe. Postwar ends with Judt expressing cautious optimism regarding the future of the European continent and the ideological model that developed there between 1945 and 2005.

== Publication and reception ==
Postwar was first published by Penguin Press in 2005. The first edition has 878 pages. Later editions are slightly longer due to the addition of a chapter entitled "Suggestions for Further Reading" before the index; the 2010 edition by Vintage books has 933 pages.

The New York Times Book Review listed it as one of the ten best books of 2005. It won the 2006 Arthur Ross Book Award for the best book published on international affairs and was shortlisted for the 2006 Samuel Johnson Prize. It also won the 2008 European Book Prize. The Guardian listed it as one of the best books of the 21st century in 2019. Likewise, the New York Times ranked it 43rd in its list of the 100 best books of the 21st century.

Reviewers have praised the book's scope and quality. Historian Anthony Gottlieb called it "rich and immensely detailed" in his review for The New York Times, and Bernard Wasserstein wrote that it is "the best history of Europe since 1945 that is currently available." Wasserstein also called it a "sophisticated stab at an impossible task." Writing for The New Yorker, Menand called the book's coverage "virtually superhuman." Stanley Hoffmann praised Postwar as a "monumental work" and "tour de force", and Simon Young wrote that "the great virtue of Judt's book is the clarity and the breadth of its [historical] account." John Gray called it a "masterpiece of historical scholarship" in The Independent, praising its balance and scope.

Postwar was written for a general audience as opposed to a strictly academic one. Reviewers have called it "readable", "vivid", and "smart". Ferrnández-Armesto also highlighted Judt's prose as being "fluent, elegant and arresting". Marina Warner wrote that Postwar is "vigorously and lucidly written".

=== Criticism ===
The historian Norman Davies nonetheless noted that Postwar "is impervious to religion, unmoved by music and rather complacent about non-French and non-political branches of art and culture" and put less emphasis on the experiences of Ireland, the larger regions of France and Germany, and regionalism in general. Similarly, Fernández-Armesto criticises the omission of "science, ecology, food, crime, black people, music, women, and art."

Wasserstein called the coverage of the history of the Soviet Union prior to 1985 "inadequate". Menand also wrote that "the book would have benefitted from another month in the shop", referring to oversights in typography and the book's index, and characterised Judt's perceived misjudgements of Continental philosophy as "silly" and "petty" anti-intellectualism.

Gray criticised Judt's endorsement of Eurocentric conceptions of democracy.

==== Sources and citations ====
Part of the acclaim for Postwar was for its wealth of historical information, but neither a full bibliography nor the sources of this encyclopedic work have ever been published. Some reviewers sharply criticized the absence of notes and bibliography, and the historian David M. Kennedy said that Postwar would have been awarded a Pulitzer Prize for History had it not been for the lack of published footnotes. Judt excused the omission of a scholarly apparatus because it was “a very long book addressed to a general readership,” but nonetheless promised that the source references and bibliography would eventually be made available online. However, the only such material ever to appear was “Suggestions for Further Reading,” a list of some 700 books in English “likely to be available to the general reader,” grouped under topics, regions, and Postwar's chapters. The list was published in the subsequent Penguin and Vintage paperback editions, and was for some years posted as the book's “General Bibliography” on the Remarque Institute website.

== Interpretations ==
Postwar combines different historiographical traditions, particularly Anglophone and French historiography.

=== Content ===
Judt considers the European model of government and economy to be an accident, brought about by "necessity and pragmatism" as opposed to a specific political vision.

Ascherson also highlights that Judt focusses on tracing the history of ideologies broadly, without devoting significant coverage to specific political parties. Similarly, Postwar does not cover individual people in any depth, with the exception of Margaret Thatcher.

=== Coverage of Eastern Europe ===
Postwar has been described as "the first major history of contemporary Europe to analyze the stories of Eastern and Western Europe in equal [...] detail"; the book includes more extensive coverage of Eastern Europe than had been common at the time, which journalist Neal Ascherson credits to influence from Norman Davies' 1996 book Europe: A History. Felipe Fernández-Armesto writes that Judt's approach resembles that of Davies "in tone and approach".

=== Themes ===
Judt wrote the book to present "an avowedly personal interpretation" without devising a "big theory" of or "overarching theme". Nonetheless, various reviewers and critics have identified recurring themes.

While Judt ostensibly refrains from deriving a grand theory of European history, according to Louis Menand, the book does present a core thesis: "Europe was able to rebuild itself politically and economically only by forgetting the past, but it was able to define itself morally and culturally only by remembering it." Judt argues that the prosperity of Western Europe in the 1950s and 1960s was "purchased at a terrible moral cost."

The book frequently returns to the topic of antisemitism and its continued effects after the end of World War II; Ascherson wrote that Judt was "writing mainly [but not exclusively] about the changing memory of the Jewish Holocaust." Judt presents European history since WWII as an "organic regrowth" characterised firstly by pragmatism and secondly by the task of processing World War II and its atrocities. Postwar has been described as focussing primarily on the history of diplomacy and political ideologies, as well as the policies of the European Community.

== See also ==
- History of Europe
