= Tony Judt =

English historian (1948–2010)

Tony Judt FBA
- Born: Tony Robert Judt; 2 January 1948; London, England
- Died: 6 August 2010 (aged 62); New York City, US
- Education: King's College, Cambridge; École Normale Supérieure
- Occupations: Historian; Erich Maria Remarque Professor in European Studies at New York University
- Spouse: Jennifer Homans

Tony Robert Judt (/dʒʌt/ JUT; 2 January 1948 – 6 August 2010) was an English historian, author, essayist and professor who specialised in European history. Judt moved to New York and served as the Erich Maria Remarque Professor in European Studies at New York University and director of NYU's Remarque Institute. He was director of the New York Institute for the Humanities from 1993 to 1996. Judt was a frequent contributor to The New York Review of Books. He was elected a Fellow of the American Academy of Arts and Sciences in 1996 and a corresponding Fellow of the British Academy in 2007.

== Biography ==
Tony Robert Judt was born on 2 January 1948 in London, England, to secular Jewish parents, Isaac Joseph Judt and Stella S Judt. His mother's parents had emigrated from Russia and Romania, and his father was born in Belgium and had immigrated as a boy to Ireland and then subsequently to England. Judt's parents lived in North London, but due to the closure of the local hospitals in response to an outbreak of infant dysentery, Judt was born in a Salvation Army maternity unit in Bethnal Green, in the East End of London. When he was a small boy, the family moved from Tottenham to a flat above his mother's business in Putney, South London. When Judt was nine years of age, following the birth of his sister, the family moved to a house in Kingston-upon-Thames, Surrey. The family's main language was English, although Judt often spoke French to his father and his father's family.

Judt won a place at Emanuel School in Wandsworth, and following his education at Emanuel, he went on to study as a scholarship student at King's College, Cambridge. He was the first member of his family to finish secondary school and to go to university. At Cambridge, Judt became close friends with Martyn Poliakoff, who later became well known as a chemist and star of The Periodic Table of Videos (Judt watched his videos and would regularly write to him about them). He obtained a BA degree in history in 1969 and after spending a year at the École Normale Supérieure in Paris completed a PhD in 1972.

As a high school and university student he was a left-wing Zionist, and worked summers on kibbutzim. He moved away from Zionism after the Six-Day War of 1967, later saying, "I went with this idealistic fantasy of creating a socialist, communitarian country", but that he came to realise that left-wing Zionists were "remarkably unconscious of the people who had been kicked out of the country...to make this fantasy possible". He came to describe his Zionism as his particular "ideological overinvestment" and he moved away from Marxism in the 1970s and 1980s. Judt wrote in February 2010, "Before even turning twenty I had become, been, and ceased to be a Zionist, a Marxist, and a communitarian settler: no mean achievement for a south London teenager". In later life, he described himself as "a universalist social democrat".

After completing his Cambridge doctorate, Judt was elected a junior fellow of King's College, Cambridge, in 1972, where he taught modern French history until 1978. After a brief stint teaching social history at the University of California, Berkeley, he returned to England in 1980 to teach politics at St Anne's College, Oxford. He moved to New York University in 1987.

Judt's works include the highly acclaimed Postwar, a history of Europe after the Second World War. He was also well known for his views on Israel, over which there was debate after he advocated a one-state solution to the Israeli–Palestinian conflict. According to the journalist David Herman, Judt's directorship of the Remarque Institute, Postwar and his articles on Israel made him "one of the best-known public intellectuals in America", having previously been "a fairly obscure British historian, specializing in modern French history".

In an interview a few weeks before his death, Judt said, "I see myself as first and above all a teacher of history; next a writer of European history; next a commentator on European affairs; next a public intellectual voice within the American Left; and only then an occasional, opportunistic participant in the pained American discussion of the Jewish matter".

Judt was married three times, his first two marriages ending in divorce. His third marriage was to Jennifer Homans, The New Republic's dance critic, with whom he had two children. In June 2010 Judt and his son Daniel wrote a dialogue about Barack Obama, politics and corporate behaviour for The New York Times.

== Writings ==
=== European history ===
Judt's experiences in Paris contributed to a long and fruitful relationship with French political culture. He translated his Cambridge doctorate into French and published it in 1976 as La reconstruction du parti socialiste: 1921–1926. It was introduced by Annie Kriegel, who along with Maurice Agulhon was an important influence on his early work as a French social historian. Judt's second book, Socialism in Provence 1871–1914: A Study in the Origins of the French Modern Left, an "enquiry into a political tradition that shaped a nation", was an attempt to explain early origins and the continuities of left-wing politics in the region. More than any other work by Judt, Socialism in Provence was based on extensive archival research. It was his only attempt to place himself within the social history that was dominant in the 1970s.

==== Modern French history ====
In the 1970s and 1980s, Judt was a historian of modern France. Marxism and the French Left: Studies in Labour and Politics in France 1830–1981 collects several previously unpublished essays on the 19th and 20th centuries, ending with a discussion of President François Mitterrand. In Past Imperfect: French Intellectuals, 1944–1956, Judt moved away both from social history towards intellectual history, and from the endorsement of French Left and Marxist traditions to their critique. In Past Imperfect, he castigated French intellectuals of the postwar era, above all Jean-Paul Sartre, for their "self-imposed moral amnesia". Judt criticised what he considered blind faith in Joseph Stalin's communism. In Judt's reading, French thinkers such as Sartre were blinded by their own provincialism, and unable to see that their calls for intellectual authenticity should have required them to interrogate their own attachment to communism and criticise the Soviet Union for its policies in postwar eastern Europe. This was in some sense a criticism from within, using French sources and polemical style against famous French intellectuals. Judt made a similar case in some of his more popular writings.

After President Jacques Chirac recognised in 1995 the responsibility of the French state during the collaboration with Nazi Germany, on the anniversary of the Vel' d'Hiv Roundup, Judt wrote in The New York Times, "people like Jean-Paul Sartre and Michel Foucault were curiously silent. One reason was their near-obsession with Communism. While proclaiming the need to 'engage', to take a stand, two generations of intellectuals avoided any ethical issue that could not advance or, in some cases, retard the Marxist cause. Vichy was dismissed as the work of a few senile Fascists. No one looked closely at what had happened during the Occupation, perhaps because very few intellectuals of any political stripe could claim to have had a 'good' war, as Albert Camus did. No one stood up to cry 'J'accuse!' at high functionaries, as Émile Zola did during the Dreyfus affair. When Simone de Beauvoir, Roland Barthes and Jacques Derrida entered the public arena, it usually involved a crisis far away—in Madagascar, Vietnam or Cambodia. Even today, politically engaged writers call for action in Bosnia but intervene only sporadically in debates about the French past."

==== Postwar ====
Postwar: A History of Europe Since 1945 cover

In the years after the publication of Past Imperfect, Judt turned his attention to wider issues of European history. He spent the 1980s and much of the 1990s at Emory, Oxford, Stanford, and Vienna, where he taught political theory, learnt Czech and became friendly with a number of Eastern European intellectuals. Erich Maria Remarque's widow, the actress Paulette Goddard, bequeathed her fortune to NYU, enabling the Institute of European Studies bearing Remarque's name to come into being under Judt's direction.

Judt's first broader book of this period—the result of a speech delivered at the Johns Hopkins-SAIS Bologna Center in 1995—was A Grand Illusion? In this extended essay, he dealt directly with the European Union and its prospects, which, in his view, were quite bleak. According to Judt, Europe's sense of its divisions had long been one of the "defining obsessions of its inhabitants". The benefits of European unity, he argued, were unevenly distributed and the regions that EU policy favoured came to have more in common with each other than with their neighbours in the same state. The Baden-Württemberg region in southwestern Germany, the Rhône-Alpes region of France, Lombardy and Catalonia were invoked as examples of disproportionately rich "super-regions". Another division, Judt claimed, could be seen in the Schengen Agreement. Nothing more than a "highest common factor of discriminatory political arithmetic", the Schengen Agreement made Eastern European countries into barrier states designed to keep undesirable immigrants at bay. Similar dangers existed in Eastern Europe, where former critics of Soviet universalism deftly recycled themselves into anti-European, nationalist agitators.

These problems, Judt wrote, could find resolution only in increased national intervention. States would be called upon to redistribute wealth and preserve the decaying social fabric of the societies they governed. This conception of the role of the state was carried over—albeit in slightly different form—into Judt's 2005 book, Postwar: A History of Europe Since 1945.

In Postwar, Judt examined the history of Europe from the end of World War II in 1945 to 2005. Such a broad subject was something of a departure for Judt, whose earlier works, such as Socialism in Provence and Past Imperfect, had focused on challenging conventional assumptions about the French Left. Nearly 900 pages long, Postwar has won considerable praise for its sweeping, encyclopaedic scope, and was a runner-up for the 2006 Pulitzer Prize for General Nonfiction. In Judt's obituary, the BBC wrote that Postwar was "acclaimed by historians as one of the best works on the subject" of modern European history. The New York Times Book Review named it one of the ten best books of 2005, and in 2009 the Toronto Star named it the decade's best historical book.

==== Ill Fares the Land ====
Judt's last book published during his lifetime, Ill Fares the Land, projected lessons learned forward, challenging readers to debate "what comes next?" The book made the case for renewed social democracy; it received mixed reviews.

Written under the debilitating effects of amyotrophic lateral sclerosis, Ill Fares The Land (2010) has been called Judt's "most overtly political book" and a "dramatic intervention" in the decline of the progressive ideals of the 20th century. Judt laments the breakdown of the postwar Keynesian policy consensus as well as the rise of neoliberal economics with its political manifestations under Margaret Thatcher, Ronald Reagan and others. In analysing the limited success achieved by Third Way triangulation and the paradoxical resurgence of unfettered capitalism after the 2008 financial crisis, Judt calls the recent past "lost decades" marked by "fantasies of prosperity". The missing reward from modern government has been social progress, and Judt explores how the social contract that had defined the postwar world—with guarantees of security, stability and fairness—is no longer considered a legitimate social goal. He concludes the book with a "passionate appeal for a return to social-democratic ideals".

=== Israel ===
Judt's parents were British citizens and secular Jews. He enthusiastically embraced Zionism at age 15. For a time he wished to emigrate to Israel, against the wishes of his parents, who were concerned about his studies. In 1966, having won an exhibition to King's College, Cambridge, he worked for the summer on kibbutz Machanaim. When the Egyptian president Gamal Abdel Nasser expelled United Nations troops from the Sinai Peninsula in 1967, and Israel mobilised for war, Judt volunteered to replace kibbutz members who had been called up. During and in the aftermath of the Six-Day War, he worked as a driver and translator for the Israel Defense Forces. After the war, Judt's belief in the Zionist enterprise began to unravel.

In an October 2003 article in The New York Review of Books, Judt argued that Israel was on its way to becoming a "belligerently intolerant, faith-driven ethno-state". He called for the conversion of "Israel from a Jewish state to a binational one" that would include all of what is now Israel, Gaza, East Jerusalem and the West Bank. This proposed new state would have equal rights for all Jews and Arabs living in Israel and the Palestinian territories. The article, which presented a view of Middle Eastern history and politics that had rarely been given exposure in the mainstream media in the US, was criticised by pro-Israeli writers who saw such a plan as "destroying" Israel and replacing it with a predominantly Palestinian state governed by a Palestinian majority. The NYRB received more than 1,000 letters within a week of its publication, peppered with terms like "antisemite" and "self-hating Jew", and the article led to Judt's removal from The New Republic's editorial board. In April 2004, Judt gave a public speech at Columbia University in which he further developed his views.

In March 2006 Judt wrote an op-ed piece for The New York Times about the John Mearsheimer and Stephen Walt paper "The Israel Lobby and U.S. Foreign Policy". Judt argued that "[in] spite of [the paper's] provocative title, the essay draws on a wide variety of standard sources and is mostly uncontentious [.... Does] the Israel Lobby affect our foreign policy choices? Of course—that is one of its goals [...]. But does pressure to support Israel distort American decisions? That's a matter of judgment." He summed up his assessment of Mearsheimer and Walt's paper by asserting that "this essay, by two 'realist' political scientists with no interest whatsoever in the Palestinians, is a straw in the wind." He predicted that "it will not be self-evident to future generations of Americans why the imperial might and international reputation of the United States are so closely aligned with one small, controversial Mediterranean client state."

In May 2006, Judt continued in a similar vein with a feature-length article, "The Country That Wouldn't Grow Up", for the Israeli newspaper Haaretz. Published the day before Israeli Independence Day, it summarises Israel's history, describing what Judt saw as a steady decline in Israel's credibility that began with the Six-Day War in 1967.

On 4 October 2006 Judt's scheduled New York talk before the organisation Network 20/20 was abruptly cancelled after Polish Consul Krzysztof Kasprzyk suddenly withdrew his offer of a venue following phone calls from the Anti-Defamation League and the American Jewish Committee. The consul later told a reporter, "I don't have to subscribe to the First Amendment." According to The New York Sun, "the appearance at the Polish consulate was canceled after the Polish government decided that Mr. Judt's views critical of Israel were not consistent with Poland's friendly relations with the Jewish state."

According to The Washington Post, the ADL and AJC had complained to the Polish consul that Judt was "too critical of Israel and American Jewry", though both organisations deny asking that the talk be cancelled. ADL National Chairman Abraham Foxman called Judt's claims of interference "wild conspiracy theories." Kasprzyk told The Washington Post that "the phone calls were very elegant but may be interpreted as exercising a delicate pressure. That's obvious—we are adults and our IQs are high enough to understand that." Judt, who had planned to argue that the Israel lobby in the US often stifled honest debate, called the implications of the cancellation "serious and frightening." He added that "only in America—not in Israel—is this a problem", charging that vigorous criticism of Israeli policy, acceptable in Israel itself, is taboo in the US. Of the ADL and AJC, he said, "These are Jewish organizations that believe they should keep people who disagree with them on the Middle East away from anyone who might listen."

The cancellation evoked protest from a roster of academics and intellectuals who said there had been an attempt to intimidate and shut down free debate. Mark Lilla and Richard Sennett wrote a letter to Foxman in protest, which was signed by 114 people and published in The New York Review of Books. In a later exchange on the subject in The New York Review of Books, Lilla and Sennet argued, "Even without knowing the substance of those 'nice' calls from the ADL and AJC, any impartial observer will recognize them as not so subtle forms of pressure."

The ADL and AJC defended their decision to contact the Polish consulate and rejected Judt's characterisation of them. Foxman accused his critics of themselves stifling free speech when "they use inflammatory words like 'threaten,' 'pressure,' and 'intimidate' that bear no resemblance to what actually transpired." He wrote that the "ADL did not threaten or intimidate or pressure anyone. The Polish consul general made his decision concerning Tony Judt's appearance strictly on his own." Foxman said that Judt had "taken the position that Israel shouldn't exist [and t]hat puts him on our radar", while AJC executive director David A. Harris said that he wanted to tell the consulate that the thrust of Judt's talk ran "contrary to the entire spirit of Polish foreign policy".

In a March 2007 interview, Judt argued the American need to block criticism of Israel stemmed from the rise of identity politics in the US. "I didn't think I knew until then just how deep and how uniquely American this obsession with blocking any criticism of Israel is. It is uniquely American." He added ruefully: "Apparently, the line you take on Israel trumps everything else in life".

Asked during an interview with NPR shortly before his death about his taste for controversy, Judt said, "I've only ever published four little essays in a lifetime of book writing and lecturing and teaching, just four little essays which touched controversially on painful bits of other people's anatomies, so to speak. Two of them were about Israel".

== Critical reception ==
Judt's peers praised him for his wide-ranging knowledge and versatility in historical analysis. Jonathan Freedland wrote in NYRB, "There are not many professors in any field equipped to produce, for example, learned essays on the novels of Primo Levi and the writings of the now forgotten Manès Sperber—yet also able to turn their hand to, say, a close, diplomatic analysis of the Cuban missile crisis of 1962." Freedland added that Judt had demonstrated "through more than a decade of essays written for America's foremost journals... that he belongs to each one of those rare, polymathic categories." In reviewing Judt's Reappraisals: Reflections on the Forgotten Twentieth Century, Freedland wrote that Judt had put conscience ahead of friendship during his life and demanded the same courage in others.

In 2009 Judt received a Special Orwell Prize for Lifetime Achievement for his contribution to British political writing.

Some of Judt's peers had a more critical view of him. Dylan John Riley of the University of California, Berkeley, argued that Judt was more of a pamphleteer and a polemicist than a historian, and that he changed his views without hesitation or good reason.

In 2007 Judt received the Hannah Arendt Prize for Political Thought (German: Hannah-Arendt-Preis für politisches Denken), a prize awarded to individuals representing the tradition of the political theorist Hannah Arendt, especially in regard to totalitarianism. It was instituted by the German Heinrich Böll Foundation (affiliated with the Alliance '90/The Greens) and the government of Bremen in 1994, and is awarded by an international jury.

== Illness and death ==
In September 2008 Judt was diagnosed with amyotrophic lateral sclerosis (ALS). From October 2009 he was paralysed from the neck down. He was nevertheless able to give a two-hour public lecture. In January 2010 he wrote a short article about his condition, the first of a series of memoirs published in The New York Review of Books. In March 2010 Judt was interviewed by Terry Gross on NPR's Fresh Air, and in June he was interviewed by the BBC's disability affairs correspondent Peter White for the Radio 4 programme No Triumph, No Tragedy.

Judt died of ALS at his home in Manhattan, New York City, on 6 August 2010. This was two weeks after a major interview and retrospective of his work in Prospect magazine and the day before an article about his illness was published in the Irish Independent indicating that he "won't surrender anytime soon" and comparing his suffering to that of the author Terry Pratchett, who was diagnosed with early-onset Alzheimer's disease in 2007. Shortly before his death, according to The Guardian, he was said to have possessed the "liveliest mind in New York." He continued his work right up until his death, writing essays for The New York Review of Books and composing and completing a synthetic intellectual history, Thinking the Twentieth Century, with his fellow-historian Timothy Snyder. Judt also wrote a memoir, The Memory Chalet, published posthumously in November 2010. During his illness, Judt made use of the memory palace technique to remember paragraphs of text during the night, which he placed mentally in rooms of a Swiss chalet and then dictated to his assistant the next day.

After Judt's death, Time magazine called him "a historian of the very first order, a public intellectual of an old-fashioned kind and—in more ways than one—a very brave man". He was also praised for carrying out what he called the historian's task: "to tell what is almost always an uncomfortable story and explain why the discomfort is part of the truth we need to live well and live properly. A well-organised society is one in which we know the truth about ourselves collectively, not one in which we tell pleasant lies about ourselves". Mark Levine, a professor of history at the University of California at Irvine, said that Judt's "writings on European history and the need for a new social contract between rulers and ruled can inspire a new generation of scholars and activists in other cultures". In his obituary in The New York Review of Books, Timothy Garton Ash placed Judt in "the great tradition of the spectateur engagé, the politically engaged but independent and critical intellectual."

== Works ==
=== Books ===
- Judt, Tony (1976). La reconstruction du parti socialiste : 1921–1926. Presses de la Fondation nationale des sciences politique. ISBN 978-2724603385.
- Roberts, Michael; Reddy, William; Judt, Tony; Exell, Arthur; Armstrong, Frankie; Pearson, Brain; Wilen, Sean (1979). History Workshop, a Journal of Socialist Historians No 7 Spring 1979. Camelot Press. ISBN 9780904383966.
- Judt, Tony (1979). Socialism in Provence 1871–1914: A Study in the Origins of the Modern French Left. Cambridge University Press. ISBN 0-521-22172-2.
- Tony Judt, ed. (1989). Resistance and Revolution in Mediterranean Europe 1939–1948. Routledge. ISBN 0-415-01580-4. (Editor)
- Judt, Tony (1990). Marxism and the French Left: Studies on Labour and Politics in France 1830–1982. Clarendon. ISBN 0-19-821578-9.
- Judt, Tony (1992). Past Imperfect: French Intellectuals, 1944-1956. University of California Press. ISBN 0-520-07921-3.
- Judt, Tony (1996). A Grand Illusion? An Essay on Europe. Douglas & McIntyre. ISBN 0-8090-5093-5.
- Judt, Tony (1998). The Burden of Responsibility: Blum, Camus, Aron, and the French Twentieth Century. University of Chicago Press. ISBN 0-226-41418-3.
- István Deák; Jan T. Gross; Tony Judt, eds. (2000). The Politics of Retribution in Europe: World War II and its Aftermath. Princeton University Press. ISBN 1-4039-6393-2. (Editor)
- de Gaulle, Charles; Hoffmann, Stanely; Thatcher, Margaret; Bundt, Kate Hansen; Mearsheimer, John J.; Malcolm, Noel; Figaro, Le; Chevènement, Jean-Pierre; Pasqua, Charles (30 July 2001). Tiersky, Ronald (ed.). Euro-skepticism: A Reader. Rowman & Littlefield Publishers. ISBN 9780742510531. (Contributor)
- Judt, Tony (18 August 2001). Schain, Martin A. (ed.). The Marshall Plan: Fifty Years After(Europe in Transition: The NYU European Studies Series). Palgrave Macmillan. ISBN 9781349627509. (Introduction)
- Zertal, Idith; Judt, Tony (2002). Israel's Holocaust and the Politics of Nationhood. Cambridge University Press. ISBN 9780511124044. (Foreword)
- Said, Edward W.; Said, Wadie E.; Judt, Tony (2004). From Oslo to Iraq and the Road Map: Essays. Vintage. ISBN 9781400076710. (Foreword)
- Tony Judt & Denis Lacorne, eds. (2004). Language, Nation, and State: Identity Politics in a Multilingual Age. Palgrave. ISBN 1-4039-6393-2. (Editor)
- Judt, Tony (2005). Postwar: A History of Europe Since 1945. Penguin Press. ISBN 1-59420-065-3.
- Tony Judt & Denis Lacorne, eds. (2005). With Us or Against Us: Studies in Global Anti-Americanism. Palgrave. ISBN 0-230-60226-6.
- Barnard, Benno; van Berlo, Martine; van Istendael, Geert; Judt, Tony; Reynebeau, Marc; De Schaepdrijver, Sophie (23 September 2005). How Can One Not Be Interested in Belgian History: War, Language and Consensus in Belgium Since 1830. Academia Press. ISBN 9789038208169.
- Judt, Tony (2008). Reappraisals: Reflections on the Forgotten Twentieth Century. Penguin Press. ISBN 978-1-59420-136-3.
- Judt, Tony (2010). Ill Fares the Land. Penguin Press. ISBN 978-1-59420-276-6.
- Judt, Tony (2010). The Memory Chalet. London: William Heinemann. ISBN 978-0-434-02096-6.
- Judt, Tony; Snyder, Timothy (2012). Thinking the Twentieth Century. London: Penguin Press. ISBN 978-1-59420-323-7.
- Judt, Tony (2015). When the Facts Change: Essays, 1995–2010. Penguin Press. ISBN 978-1-59420600-9. 400 pp.
- Judt, Tony (2010). The Glory of the Rails. ERIS Gems. ERIS (published 1 August 2022). ISBN 9781912475834.

=== Book reviews ===
- Judt, Tony (3 November 1994). "Truth and consequences". The New York Review of Books. 41 (18): 8–12.
- Péan, Pierre. Une jeunesse française : François Mitterrand 1934–1947. Fayard.

== See also ==
- Eric Hobsbawm
- Raymond Aron
