= Thinking the Twentieth Century =

First edition (publ. Heinemann)

Thinking the Twentieth Century is a 2012 book by historians Timothy Snyder and Tony Judt. The book is based primarily on material by Judt, edited by Snyder. It presents Judt's view on the history of the 20th century.
