= Hannah Arendt Prize =

German human rights award

The Hannah Arendt Prize for Political Thought (German: Hannah-Arendt-Preis für politisches Denken) is a prize awarded to individuals representing the tradition of political theorist Hannah Arendt, especially in regard to totalitarianism. It was instituted by the German Heinrich Böll Foundation (affiliated with the Alliance 90/The Greens) and the government of Bremen in 1994, and is awarded by an international jury. The prize money is €10,000.

== Laureates ==
Prize recipients
Year	Person	Country	Ref.
1995	Ágnes Heller	Hungary	
1996	François Furet	France	
1997	Freimut Duve	Germany	
1997	Joachim Gauck	Germany	
1998	Antje Vollmer	Germany	
1998	Claude Lefort	France	
1999	Massimo Cacciari	Italy	
2000	Yelena Bonner	Russia	
2001	Ernst Vollrath	Germany	
2001	Daniel Cohn-Bendit	France, Germany	
2002	Gianni Vattimo	Italy	
2003	Michael Ignatieff	Canada	
2004	Ernst-Wolfgang Böckenförde	Germany	
2005	Vaira Vīķe-Freiberga	Latvia	
2006	Julia Kristeva	Bulgaria, France	
2007	Tony Judt	United Kingdom	
2008	Victor Zaslavsky	Russia	
2009	Kurt Flasch	Germany	
2010	François Jullien	France	
2011	Navid Kermani	Germany, Iran	
2012	Yfaat Weiss	Israel	
2013	Timothy Snyder	United States	
2014	Nadya Tolokonnikova	Russia	
2014	Maria Alyokhina	Russia	
2014	Yurii Andrukhovych	Ukraine	
2016	Christian Teichmann	Germany	
2017	Étienne Balibar	France	
2018	Ann Pettifor	South Africa, United Kingdom	
2019	Roger Berkowitz	United States	
2019	Jerome Kohn	United States	
2021	Jill Lepore	United States	
2022	Serhiy Zhadan	Ukraine	
2023	Masha Gessen	Russia, United States	
2025	Seyla Benhabib	United States, Turkey	

== Controversy ==
In 2023, the German-Israeli Society Bremen chapter chair Hermann Kuhn wrote an open letter calling for a suspension of Masha Gessen's prize out of objection to their essay "In the Shadow of the Holocaust" in The New Yorker. Gessen compared the Blockade of the Gaza Strip to Jewish ghettos established by Nazi Germany, stating “the ghetto is being liquidated” in the context of the 2023 Israeli invasion of the Gaza Strip. The Heinrich Böll Foundation initially announced it would not sponsor the award, then later announced that the award would be presented in a smaller ceremony.

In response to criticisms, Gessen said "Hannah Arendt wouldn’t have gotten the Hannah Arendt prize if you applied those kinds of criteria to it," and referenced Arendt's frequent comparisons of Israeli policies and ideologies to Nazi Germany. In The New Yorker essay they quoted Arendt's 1948 letter that compared Menachem Begin's Herut party to the Nazis.
