= Roger Berkowitz (political theorist) =

American academic

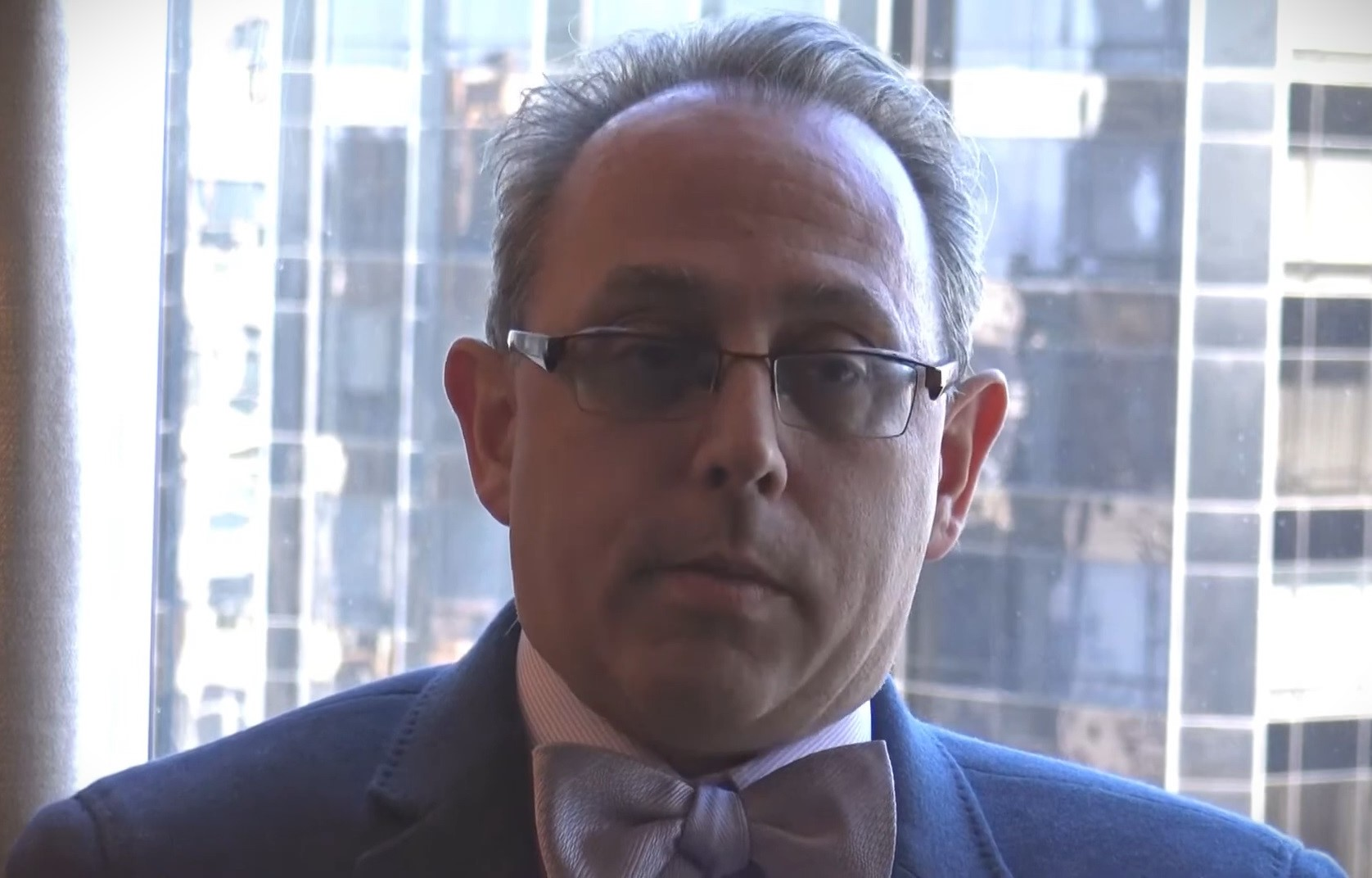
Berkowitz in 2016

Roger Berkowitz is an American scholar and professor whose work focuses on politics, philosophy, and law. He is recognized as a leading scholar on the political thinking of Hannah Arendt. In 2006, he founded the Hannah Arendt Center for Politics and Humanities at Bard College, where he is a Professor of Politics, Philosophy, and Human Rights.

== Education ==
He holds a B.A. in political science from Amherst College, a J.D. from the University of California, Berkeley, School of Law (formerly Boalt Hall), and a Ph.D. in Jurisprudence and Social Policy from the University of California, Berkeley.

== Career ==
In his role at Bard College, Berkowitz serves as the Academic Director of the Hannah Arendt Center for Politics and Humanities and Professor of Politics, Philosophy, and Human Rights. His academic and public work focuses on political theory, legal thought, and the writings of Hannah Arendt.

At the Center, Berkowitz oversees interdisciplinary programming focused on political thought, ethics, and public discourse. He is the founding editor of HA: The Journal of the Hannah Arendt Center and writes the Center's weekly newsletter Amor Mundi, which explores contemporary issues in politics and philosophy. Since 2012, he has hosted the podcast Reading Hannah Arendt with Roger Berkowitz, a weekly virtual reading group featuring close readings of Arendt's work, alongside interviews and discussions on the ongoing relevance of her political philosophy.

His essays and commentary have appeared in publications including the Los Angeles Review of Books, The New York Times, The Paris Review, Democracy: A Journal of Ideas, and the Yale Journal of Law and the Humanities. Berkowitz is also known for making scholarly discussions of political theory and Hannah Arendt accessible to wider audiences through public writing, podcasts, and educational programming.

== Books ==
- The Gift of Science: Leibniz and the Modern Legal Tradition (Harvard University Press, 2005; Fordham University Press, 2010; Chinese Law Press, 2011)
- Thinking in Dark Times: Hannah Arendt on Ethics and Politics (Fordham University Press, 2009), co-editor
- The Intellectual Origins of the Global Financial Crisis (Fordham University Press, 2012), co-editor
- Artifacts of Thinking: Reading Hannah Arendt's Denktagebuch (Fordham University Press, 2017), co-editor
- The Perils of Invention: Lying, Technology, and the Human Condition (Black Rose Books, 2022), editor
- On Civil Disobedience (Library of America, 2024), editor and author of the introduction
- A World We Share: Hannah Arendt and the Power of Friendship in a Broken World (Yale University Press, 2026)

== Awards ==
In 2019, Berkowitz received the Hannah Arendt Prize for Political Thought, awarded by the Heinrich Böll Foundation and the City of Bremen in Germany, in recognition of his contributions to political philosophy and public discourse. He was also honored with the 2024 Compassion Award from Con-solatio at a ceremony in New York City for his work fostering intellectual engagement with political and ethical issues.
