= Jennifer Homans =

American historian, author, and dance critic

- Born: 1960 (age 65–66); Chicago, Illinois, United States
- Education: University of North Carolina School of the Arts; School of American Ballet; Columbia University (BA); New York University (PhD)
- Occupation: Author
- Notable work: Apollo's Angels: A History of Ballet
- Spouse: Tony Judt (m. 1993; died 2010)

Jennifer A. Homans (born 1960) is an American historian, author, and dance critic. Her book Apollo's Angels: A History of Ballet was a finalist for the National Book Critics Circle Award in 2010.

== Early life and education ==
Homans was raised in Chicago, Illinois, where she trained as a ballerina from the age of eight. By the time she was a teenager, Homans had enrolled in dance classes at the University of Chicago and later began training at the University of North Carolina School of the Arts and the School of American Ballet. After dancing professionally with the Pacific Northwest Ballet, Homas began attending Columbia University at the age of 26. After graduating with her B.A. degree in French literature, she began studying for a Ph.D. in modern European history at New York University.

== Career ==
Following her PhD, Homans accepted a position as a Distinguished Scholar in Residence at NYU, where she wrote her first book, Apollo's Angels: A History of Ballet. Apollo's Angels traced back the origins of ballet from the Renaissance to modern times. The book was described by The New York Times as "the only truly definitive history of ballet". It was a finalist for the National Book Critics Circle Award and was named as one of the "10 Best Books of 2010" by the New York Times. Homans' claim that ballet is a dying art form generated controversy. Art critic Claudia La Rocco rebuffed Homans' claims and critiqued the book for its alleged lack of attention to post-George Balanchine developments in ballet, including William Forsythe.

From 2012 to 2013, Homans was granted a Guggenheim Fellowship as she began writing her second book, a history of George Balanchine. The following year, she established the Center for Ballet and the Arts at NYU with funding from the Andrew W. Mellon Foundation to help "establish ballet as a serious subject of academic inquiry." In its inaugural cohort, the institute accepted seven fellows; John Carrafa, Gregory Mosher, J. David Velleman, Heather Watts, Frederick Wiseman, Christopher d'Amboise, and John Michael Schert.

In 2016, Homans was selected as a Fellow of the New York Public Library's Dorothy and Lewis B. Cullman Center for Scholars and Writers. In 2019, Homans' Center for Ballet and the Arts received a three-year $2 million grant. She was also named The New Yorker's dance critic, replacing Joan Acocella.

She was named a fellow of the American Academy of Arts and Sciences in 2021. Her 2022 book Mr. B: George Balanchine's 20th Century was a finalist for the 2023 National Book Critics Circle Award for Biography and the Pulitzer Prize for Biography.

== Personal life ==
Homans married Tony Judt, with whom she had two children.

== Bibliography ==
=== Books ===
- Homans, Jennifer (2010). Apollo's Angels: A History of Ballet.
- —— (2022). Mr. B : George Balanchine's 20th Century.

=== Essays and reporting ===
- Homans, J. (17 February 2002). "Steps, Steps, Steps". The New Republic.
- —— (12 October 2010). "Is Ballet Over?". The New Republic.
- —— (13 September 2012). "A Woman's Place". The New York Times.
- —— (4 October 2013). "The Crisis in Contemporary Ballet". The New Republic.
- —— (12 September 2014). "Charles James Was an Artist—But Don't Hang His Works in a Museum". The New Republic.
- —— (January 6, 2020). "Song of experience : Nocha Flamenca gets deeper with age". The Critics. Dancing. The New Yorker. 95 (43): 66–67. (Note: Online version is titled "Nocha Flamenca gets deeper with age".)
- —— (September 12, 2022). "The return: touring the Soviet Union, George Balanchine confronted his homeland's fate". Life and Letters. The New Yorker. 98 (28): 20–26. (Note: Online version is titled "George Balanchine's Soviet reckoning".)

———————
