= David R. Stone =

Military historian of Russia based in the United States

David Russell Stone (born 1968) is an American military historian and the William Eldridge Odom Professor of Russian Studies in the Strategy and Policy Department at the U.S. Naval War College.

Stone received a Bachelor of Arts degree in history and mathematics from Wabash College and a PhD degree in history from Yale University. He has taught at Hamilton College and from 2001 to 2015 at Kansas State University, where he served as the Pickett Professor of Military History. He won the Marshall D. Shulman Book Prize of the Association for Slavic, East European, and Eurasian Studies and the Best First Book Prize of the Historical Society for his first book, Hammer and Rifle: The Militarization of the Soviet Union, 1926-1933. He specializes in the military history of Russia and the Soviet Union. He has written a number of books and several dozen historical articles and book chapters on Russian and Soviet military history and foreign policy.

== Works ==
=== Books ===
- Hammer and Rifle: The Militarization of the Soviet Union, 1926-1933 (University Press of Kansas, 2000).
- A Military History of Russia: From Ivan the Terrible to the War in Chechnya (Praeger Publishers, 2006).
- (ed.) The Soviet Union at War, 1941-1945 (Pen & Sword Military, 2010).
- The Russian Army in the Great War: The Eastern Front, 1914-1917 (University Press of Kansas, 2015).
- David R. Stone, Jonathan D. Smele, Geoffrey Swain, Alex Marshall, Steven Marks, Andrei V. Ganin, eds. The Russian Civil War: Campaigns and Operations (Slavica, 2022).
- David R. Stone, Jonathan D. Smele, Geoffrey Swain, Alex Marshall, Steven Marks, Andrei V. Ganin, eds. The Russian Civil War: Military and Society (Slavica, 2022).

=== Audio and Video Lecture Series ===
Stone has done two lecture series for The Great Courses, including:

- "World War II: Battlefield Europe" (24 lectures)
- "War in the Modern World" (24 lectures)
