= Our Malady =

2020 book by Timothy Snyder

Our Malady: Lessons in Liberty from a Hospital Diary
- Author: Timothy Snyder
- Language: English
- Subject: Health care, politics
- Publisher: Crown (paperback)
- Publication date: September 8, 2020
- Publication place: United States
- Media type: Print (paperback), e-book, audiobook
- Pages: 192
- ISBN: 0593238893
- Preceded by: The Road to Unfreedom

Our Malady: Lessons in Liberty from a Hospital Diary is a 2020 book by Timothy Snyder. In it, Snyder explores the problems faced by the medical care in the United States.

== Background ==
In December 2019, Timothy Snyder fell seriously ill with abdominal pain and was admitted to a hospital in Munich. The diagnosis of appendicitis was missed. Two weeks later, he had an appendectomy in Connecticut and was discharged after 24 hours. Following another medical misdiagnosis in Florida he developed sepsis and was treated 26 days later in New Haven with a liver abscess. While recuperating from this illness through the coronavirus pandemic he wrote the book about the problems of the for-profit health care system in the USA, and the coronavirus response so far.

== Overview ==
The Prologue "Solitude and Solidarity" is followed by an Introduction "Our Malady". Lesson 1 is entitled "Healthcare is a human right. Here, Snyder explains the history of health care as a human right after the fall of the Third Reich where it arose in Postwar Europe, but was not codified in the United States.

In Lesson 2 : "Renewal begins with children" he compares childbirth in Austria and the US and posits that "commercialized health care impedes the freedom of families". Lesson 3: "The truth shall set us free" is about how the value of truth is connected to facts and creation of knowledge and how science should drive public policy. Lesson 4: "Doctors should be in charge" makes the case that physicians should to take "greater leadership in national politics".

The Conclusion is entitled: "Our recovery" and argues that the healthcare system should work for people rather than for profit. The last chapter is an Epilogue "Rage and Empathy".

== Reception ==
A detailed and favorable review in The British Journal of General Practice explained the title byline in the "paradox of liberty" consisting of a tension between individual liberty and social solidarity.

The Journal Health Affairs called it an "impassioned meditation on the state of US health care" and reviewed each chapter in detail. It critically observed that he relied on simplification at times, for example in his interpretation of why the US fared worse during the COVID-19 pandemic.

The Washington Post called it a "loud and lucid" rant from a patient done wrong, but that the book lacked his authority in health care. The Jewish Journal reviewed it more favorably, even calling it a "companion volume" to his prior bestseller On Tyranny. Three reviewers point out the rage expressed in the book.
