= Victor Zaslavsky =

Canadian professor of political sociology (1937–2009)

- Born: Victor Lvovich Zaslavsky; 26 September 1937; Leningrad, Russian SFSR, Soviet Union
- Died: 26 November 2009 (aged 72); Rome, Italy
- Occupations: Professor of political sociology, theorist

Victor Lvovich Zaslavsky (Russian: Виктор Львович Заславский; 26 September 1937 – 26 November 2009) was a professor of political sociology who taught at various institutions, such as LUISS (Libera Università Internazionale degli Studi Sociali Guido Carli), the Leningrad State University, the Memorial University of Newfoundland in St. John's, Canada, the University of California at Berkeley, Stanford University, and elsewhere, during a long academic career. He developed trenchant analyses of political and social aspects of the Soviet Union, prior to and following its collapse.

Born in Leningrad, Zaslavsky was a naturalized citizen of Canada. He was a member of the board of the political journal Telos for several decades. His major work prior to his death, about the Katyn massacre, was Class Cleansing: The Massacre at Katyn, which received the Hannah Arendt Prize for Political Thought from the Heinrich Boell Foundation. Zaslavsky's articles published in journals throughout the later years of the 20th century gained him a following in the United States and across continental Europe.

== Selected works ==
- Class Cleansing: The Massacre at Katyn (Telos Press Publishing, 2008).
- From Union to Commonwealth: Nationalism and Separatism in the Soviet Republics Co-Author (Cambridge University Press, 1992).
- The Neo-Stalinist State: Class, Ethnicity, and Consensus in Soviet Society (ME Sharpe Inc, 1994).

== Noteworthy journal articles ==
- "The Rebirth of the Stalin Cult in the USSR" (TELOS, Summer 1979).
- "The Regime and the Working Class in the USSR" (TELOS, Winter 1979-80).
- "The Price of Sovietization" (TELOS, Spring 1987).
- "Three Years of Perestroika" (TELOS, Winter 1987-88).
- "Why Afghanistan?" (TELOS, Spring 1980).
