= Marci Shore =

American historian

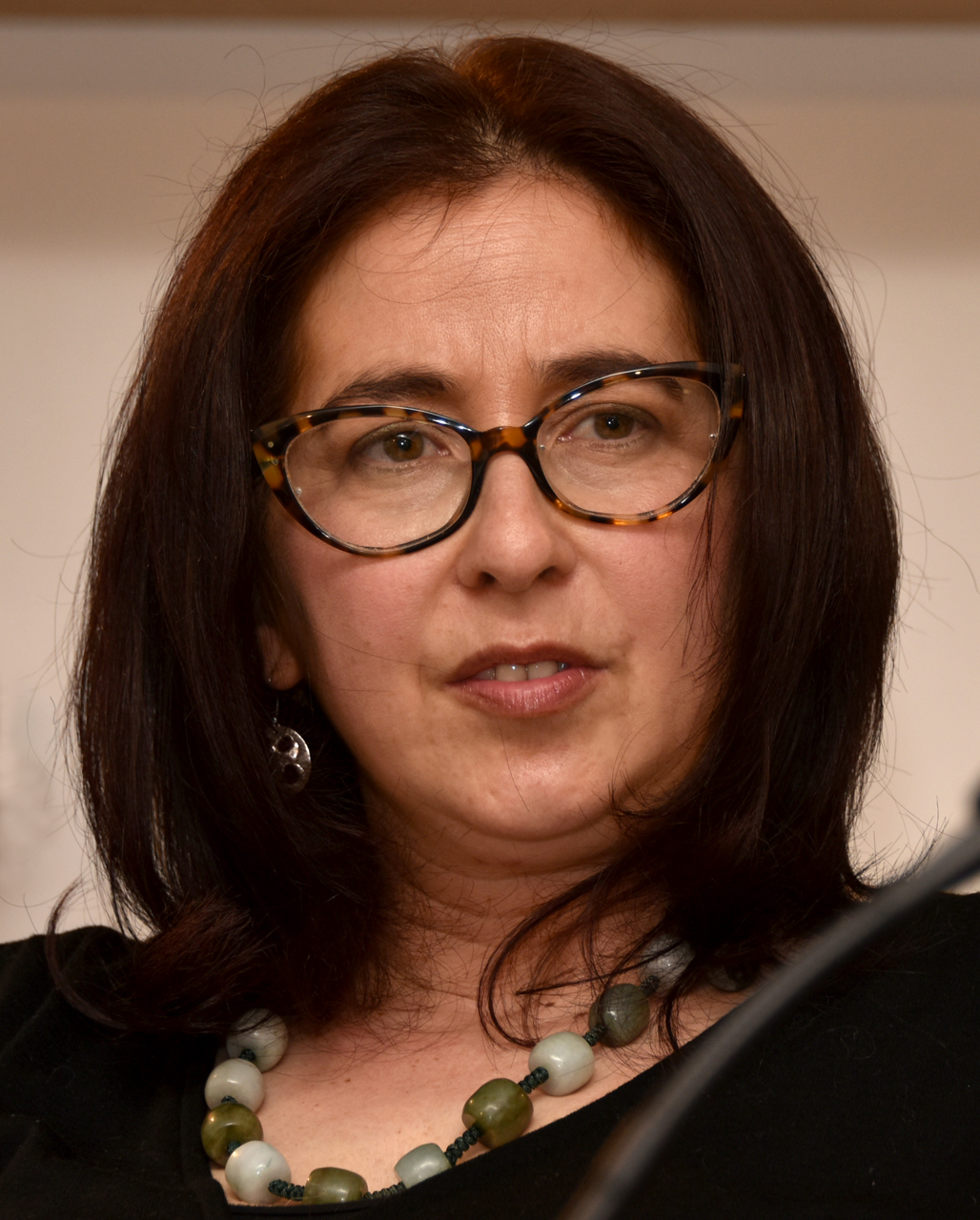
- Shore in March 2019
- Born: 1972 (age 53–54); Allentown, Pennsylvania, U.S.
- Occupation: professor of intellectual history
- Spouse: Timothy D. Snyder (m. 2005)
- Children: 2

Academic background
- Education: Stanford University (BA, PhD); University of Toronto (MA)

Academic work
- Discipline: Historian
- Sub-discipline: History of literary and political engagement with Marxism and phenomenology
- Institutions: University of Toronto
- Main interests: Marxism and phenomenology

Marci Shore (born 1972) is an American professor of intellectual history at the University of Toronto, where she specializes in the history of literary and political engagement with Marxism and phenomenology.

Shore is the author of Caviar and Ashes: A Warsaw Generation's Life and Death in Marxism, 1918–1968, a milieu biography of Polish and Polish-Jewish writers drawn to Marxism in the twentieth century; and of The Taste of Ashes, a study of the presence of the communist and Nazi past in today's Eastern Europe. She translated Michał Głowiński's Holocaust memoir, The Black Seasons.

== Early life and education ==
Shore was born in Allentown, Pennsylvania, in 1972. She is a 1990 graduate of William Allen High School in Allentown. She then attended Stanford University, receiving a B.A. in 1994. Two years later, in 1996, she received an M.A. from the University of Toronto. She received a doctorate from Stanford University in 2001.

== Career ==
Shore was a postdoctoral fellow at the Harriman Institute at Columbia University, an assistant professor of history and Jewish studies at Indiana University; and the Jacob and Hilda Blaustein Visiting Assistant Professor of Judaic Studies at Yale University. She has twice been a fellow of the Institut für die Wissenschaften vom Menschen (Institute of Human Sciences) in Vienna. Until March 2025, Shore taught European cultural and intellectual history at Yale.

In March 2025, shortly after the 2024 United States presidential election, Shore and her husband, Timothy Snyder, left their positions at Yale and another Yale faculty member, Jason Stanley, also departed, drawing national media attention during political criticism of universities. The three academics published a video op-ed, "We Study Fascism, and We're Leaving the US", in The New York Times, explaining their decision to leave the United States. Shore and her husband made this decision already before the 2024 elections. The professors later took positions at the Munk School of Global Affairs of the University of Toronto.

== Awards ==
Her book, Caviar and Ashes: A Warsaw Generation's Life and Death in Marxism, 1918-1968, won eight awards and was shortlisted for several more. These include the following:

- Winner, 2006 National Jewish Book Award in Eastern European Studies, given by the Jewish Book Council.
- Winner, 2007 Oskar Halecki Polish/East Central European History Award, given by the Polish Institute of Arts and Sciences of America.
- Co-winner, 2007 American Association for the Advancement of Slavic Studies/Orbis Books Prize for Polish Studies.
- Finalist for the Koret International Jewish Book Award in Jewish Thought.

== Publications ==
=== Books ===
- Translator, Michał Głowiński's The Black Seasons (Northwestern University Press, 2005)
- Caviar and Ashes: A Warsaw Generation's Life and Death in Marxism, 1918–1968 (Yale University Press, 2006, Polish edition: Świat Ksiazki, 2008)
- The Taste of Ashes (Crown Books/Random House, 2013, UK edition: Heinemann, German edition: Beck, Polish edition: Świat Ksiazki)
- The Ukrainian Night: An Intimate History of Revolution (Yale University Press, 2017)

=== Articles ===
- "Czysto Babski: A Women's Friendship in a Man's Revolution". East European Politics and Societies, Aug. 1, 2002
- "Engineering in the Age of Innocence: A Genealogy of Discourse Inside the Czechoslovak Writer's Union, 1949–1967". East European Politics and Societies, September 1998, Vol. 12 Issue 3
- "Children of the Revolution: Communism, Zionism, and the Berman Brothers", Jewish Social Studies. Spring 2004, Vol. 10 Issue 3
- "Conversing with Ghosts: Jedwabne, Zydokomuna, and Totalitarianism", Kritika: Explorations of Russian and Eurasian History, June 2005, Vol. 6 Issue 2
- "Tevye's Daughters: Jews and European Modernity", Contemporary European History. February 2007, Vol. 16 Issue 1
- "When God Died: Symptoms of the East European Avant-Garde—and of Slavoj Žižek". Slovo a smysl/Word and Sense: A Journal of Interdisciplinary Theory and Criticism in Czech Studies, 2005
- "Man liess sie nicht mal ein paar Worte sagen". Frankfurter Allgemeine Zeitung, December 2001
- "Za dużo kompromisów. Stop". Gazeta Wyborcza (Warsaw), July 11, 2009
- “(The End of) Communism as a Generational History: Some Thoughts on Czechoslovakia and Poland”. Contemporary European History 18, no. 3 (2009)
- "A Pre-History of Post-Truth, East and West". Eurozine and Public Seminar Sept. 1 2017
- "On the Uses and Disadvantages of Historical Comparisons for Life". Public Seminar Oct. 19, 2020

== Personal life ==
Shore married Timothy D. Snyder, a professor of history now at the University of Toronto, in 2005. They have two children.

== See also ==
- Human capital flight from the United States of America
