= The Reconstruction of Nations =

2003 history book by Timothy Snyder

The Reconstruction of Nations: Poland, Ukraine, Lithuania, Belarus, 1569–1999
- Author: Timothy Snyder
- Language: English
- Subject: History of Poland, Ukraine, Lithuania and Belarus
- Publisher: Yale University Press
- Publication date: 2003
- Publication place: United States
- Pages: 367
- ISBN: 9780300128413
- OCLC: 182530832

The Reconstruction of Nations: Poland, Ukraine, Lithuania, Belarus, 1569–1999 is a 2003 book by Timothy Snyder and published by the Yale University Press. It focuses on the last few hundred years of history of several Central and Eastern European countries; in particular, states descended from the Polish–Lithuanian Commonwealth, once the largest state of early modern Europe: Poland, Ukraine, Lithuania and Belarus. The book is concerned with the emergence of those modern states through the troubled history of that region, which included wars and ethnic cleansing, and concludes that national reconciliation and good neighbourly relations are possible even after such difficult events.

== Contents ==
According to Brian Porter, the key question considered by Snyder in this work is "When do nations arise, what brings ethnic cleansing, how can states reconcile?". Theodore R. Weeks puts it even more simply as "What are nations and how do they arise?".

The book traces the emergence of modern states in Central and Eastern Europe, in particular, Poland, Ukraine, Lithuania and Belarus, which arose from the Polish–Lithuanian Commonwealth, once the largest state of early modern Europe (created in the Union of Lublin in the year 1569 which marks the beginning of the time period covered by the book). In particular, he focuses how cultural and political elites in those countries constructed the modern images of these nations in the 19th and 20th centuries, transforming the historical concept of the Polish-Lithuanian identity into the identities of modern Polish, Ukrainian, Lithuanian and Belarusian people.

The book is divided into three major parts. The first focuses on the history of the Vilnius region or more broadly, the Lithuanian part of the former Polish–Lithuanian Commonwealth; the second, on Galicia and Volhynia (modern Eastern Poland and Western Ukraine), and the last, on post-1989 Poland, with focus on how modern Polish people have mostly come to accept the loss of its Eastern territories and succeeded at establishing workable relations with its neighbours. In that later part, Snyder credits the influence of Jerzy Giedroyc (Polish editor of the Paris-based periodical, Kultura) and Polish dissidents on shaping a reconciliation-friendly and anti-Russian imperialism policy in Central and Eastern Europe, following the end of the communist regimes in 1989 and succeeding years.

The book touches upon difficult topics such as the nationalistic processes of cultural assimilation (like Lithuanization), massacres of Poles in Volhynia and Eastern Galicia, the Holocaust and the post–World War II forced migrations (such as the Polish population transfers of 1944–1946 and the Operation Vistula). Snyder's two main "noteworthy conclusions" are as follows. First, that "particularities of each case" (such as random events and personalities of leaders) are very important, and second, that national identity in the modern world mainly relies on history that is culturally constructed and curated by elites rather than traditions related to "memories cultivated by" small groups.

As noted by Richard Butterwick, the book, while describing said difficult topics, is also positive, as Snyder concludes that "national reconciliation is possible after even the most terrible conflicts".

== Reception ==
George O. Liber reviewed the book for Harvard Ukrainian Studies. He called the book "pioneering", and commended it for "magnificent 'thick description' of the history of East Central Europe".

Robert Legvold in his brief review for Foreign Affairs wrote that the book is "fresh and stimulating".

John-Paul Himka reviewed the book in 2004 for The American Historical Review. Himka praised the book as "an outstanding read" and "one of the most interesting works in East European history to have appeared in the last decade". Also that year, Theodore R. Weeks writing for The Russian Review described the book as "an engaging, sophisticated and highly readable study", as well as, with "some caveats", an "ambitions and sophisticated work deserving a broad readership". Richard Butterwick, also in 2004, reviewed this work (together with Norman Davies' Microcosm: Portrait of a Central European City) for The English Historical Review. He called it a "ambitiously conceived and superbly executed", although he cautioned that the book may be "better received" in Poland than in Lithuania or Ukraine due to its "implicit endorsements of Poles as 'elder brothers' and 'mediators'".

Brian Porter reviewed the book in 2005 for the Slavic Review. Porter praised the book as "courageous", "an invaluable resource" and "a provocative and enjoyable read". Porter noted that Snyder's work is based on secondary sources and published primary collections, and as such its main strength lies not in original research but on the author's argumentation: "the great strength of this book... is not the new information it provides but the effective way it repackages [it]".

In 2008 Sergei I. Zhuk reviewed the book for the Canadian-American Slavic Studies. Zhuk was more critical than some previous reviewers, pointing out Snyder's reliance on secondary sources, as well as some omissions from his literature review. Nonetheless, he concluded that despite some issues, the book is innovative and it "is still an important contribution to the history of national transformations in Eastern Europe".

== Awards ==
The book received several awards:

- George Louis Beer Prize, American Historical Association, 2003
- Przegląd Wschodni (Eastern Review) Best Foreign Academic Book, 2003
- American Association for Ukrainian Studies Book Prize, shared, 2004
- Jerzy Giedroyc Scholarly Award, Marie Curie-Skłodowska University, 2008
- Honorable mention, Orbis-AAASS Book Prize in Polish Studies, 2004
