= István Deák =

Hungarian-American historian (1926–2023)

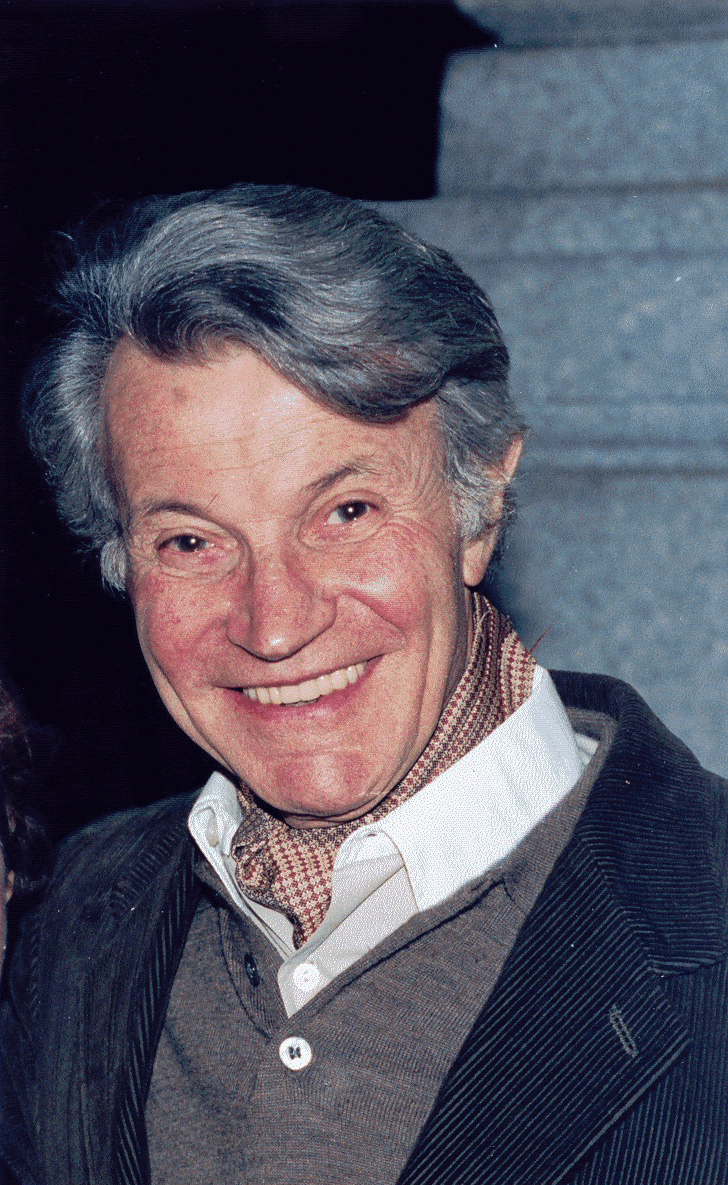
Deák in 2008

István Deák (11 May 1926 – 9 January 2023) was a Hungarian-born American historian, author and academic. He was a specialist in modern Europe, with special attention to Germany and Hungary.

== Life and work ==
István Deák was born in Székesfehérvár, Hungary, into an assimilated Jewish family that had converted to Catholicism. His parents were Istvan and Anna (Timár) Deák. He was educated at a Catholic gymnasium (high school) in Budapest and began his university studies in 1945 at the University of Budapest. His studies were disrupted by the war and postwar chaos, and he left Hungary in 1948, following the communist takeover. He then studied history at the Sorbonne in Paris and worked as a journalist in France and for Radio Free Europe in West Germany. In 1956, unable to gain residence in France, he settled in New York City where he studied modern European history at Columbia University under Fritz Stern. He obtained an M.A. (1958) and then a Ph.D. (1964), with a dissertation on "Weimar Germany's 'homeless Left': The world of Carl von Ossietzky," and spent the next 33 years teaching at Columbia. He was the Director of Columbia's Institute on East Central Europe between 1968 and 1979. Prior to teaching at Columbia, he was an instructor for one year (1962–63) at Smith College.

Deák wrote extensively on eastern and central European history and politics. His publications include Weimar Germany's Left-wing Intellectuals (1968); The Lawful Revolution: Louis Kossuth and the Hungarians, 1848–1849 (1979); Beyond Nationalism: A Social and Political History of the Habsburg Officer Corps, 1848–1918 (1990); and Essays on Hitler's Europe (2001). He edited and partly wrote, together with Jan T. Gross and Tony Judt, The Politics of Retribution in Europe: World War II and Its Aftermath (2000). His most recent work is Europe on Trial. The Story of Collaboration, Resistance, and Retribution during World War II (2015). He has also written extensively for the New York Review of Books and other periodicals.

In 1964 Deák was able to visit Hungary for the first time since his departure, and thereafter he regularly attended academic conferences in Hungary and worked to re-establish links between American and Hungarian historians. In 1990, following the fall of the communist regime, he was elected to the Hungarian Academy of Sciences. He retired from teaching in 1997 and was later a visiting professor at Stanford University. He continued to publish on European history, particularly issues relating to the Holocaust. His wife, Gloria Deak, is an art historian.

Deák died on 10 January 2023, at the age of 96.

== Bibliography ==
=== Books written ===
- Deák, István (1968). Weimar Germany's Left-Wing Intellectuals: A Political History of the Weltbühne and Its Circle. University of California Press.
- Deák, István (1979). The Lawful Revolution: Louis Kossuth and the Hungarians, 1848–1849. Columbia University Press.
- Deák, István (1990). Beyond Nationalism: A Social and Political History of the Habsburg Officer Corps, 1848–1918. Oxford University Press.
- Deák, István (2001). Essays on Hitler's Europe. University of Nebraska Press.
- Deák, István (2015). Europe on Trial. The Story of Collaboration, Resistance, and Retribution during World War II. Westview Press.

=== Books edited ===
- Deák, István; Gross, Jan T.; Judt, Tony (2000). The Politics of Retribution in Europe: World War II and Its Aftermath. Princeton University Press.
