= Stefanos Geroulanos =

American historian (born 1979)

Stefanos Geroulanos (born 1979) is an American historian and educator. His books include The Invention of Prehistory (2024).

== Early life and education ==
Geroulanos grew up in Greece. He received a BA from Princeton University in 2001 and a PhD from Johns Hopkins University in 2008.

== Career ==
Geroulanos is a professor of history at New York University and director of the Remarque Institute at the University. He is an executive editor of the Journal of the History of Ideas.

== Publications ==
- An Atheism that is Not Humanist Emerges in French Thought. Cultural Memory in The Present series. Redwood City, California: Stanford University Press, 2010. ISBN 9780804762984.
- Experimente im Individuum: Kurt Goldstein und die Frage des Organismus. With Todd Meyers. Berlin: 2014. ISBN 978-3-94136-030-3.
- Transparency in Postwar France: a Critical History of the Present. Stanford University Press, 2017. ISBN 9780804799744.
- The Human Body in the Age of Catastrophe: Brittleness, Integration, Science, and the Great War. With Todd Meyers. Chicago: University of Chicago Press, 2018. ISBN 9780226556451.
- The Invention of Prehistory: Empire, Violence, and Our Obsession with Human Origins. New York: Boni & Liveright, 2024. ISBN 978-1-324-09612-2.
