= Sketches from a Secret War =

2005 book

Sketches from a Secret War: A Polish Artist's Mission to Liberate Soviet Ukraine
- Author: Timothy Snyder
- Language: English
- Publisher: New Haven and London: Yale University Press
- Publication date: November 28, 2005
- Publication place: United States
- Pages: 384
- ISBN: 978-0-300-12599-3

Sketches from a Secret War: A Polish Artist's Mission to Liberate Soviet Ukraine is a 2005 book by Timothy Snyder. It focuses on the interwar history of the Second Polish Republic and Soviet Ukraine through the prism of the life of Henryk Józewski. Its conclusions consist partly of new research based on the archives of the Polish military.

== Awards ==
- Pro Historia Polonorum, for best book on Polish history by a foreign scholar in the previous five years, 2008.
- Shortlisted as one of three books for the main Polityka history prize, 2009.
- Shortlisted as one of nine books for the Moczarski history prize, 2009.
