= The Red Prince: The Secret Lives of a Habsburg Archduke =

2008 book by Timothy Snyder

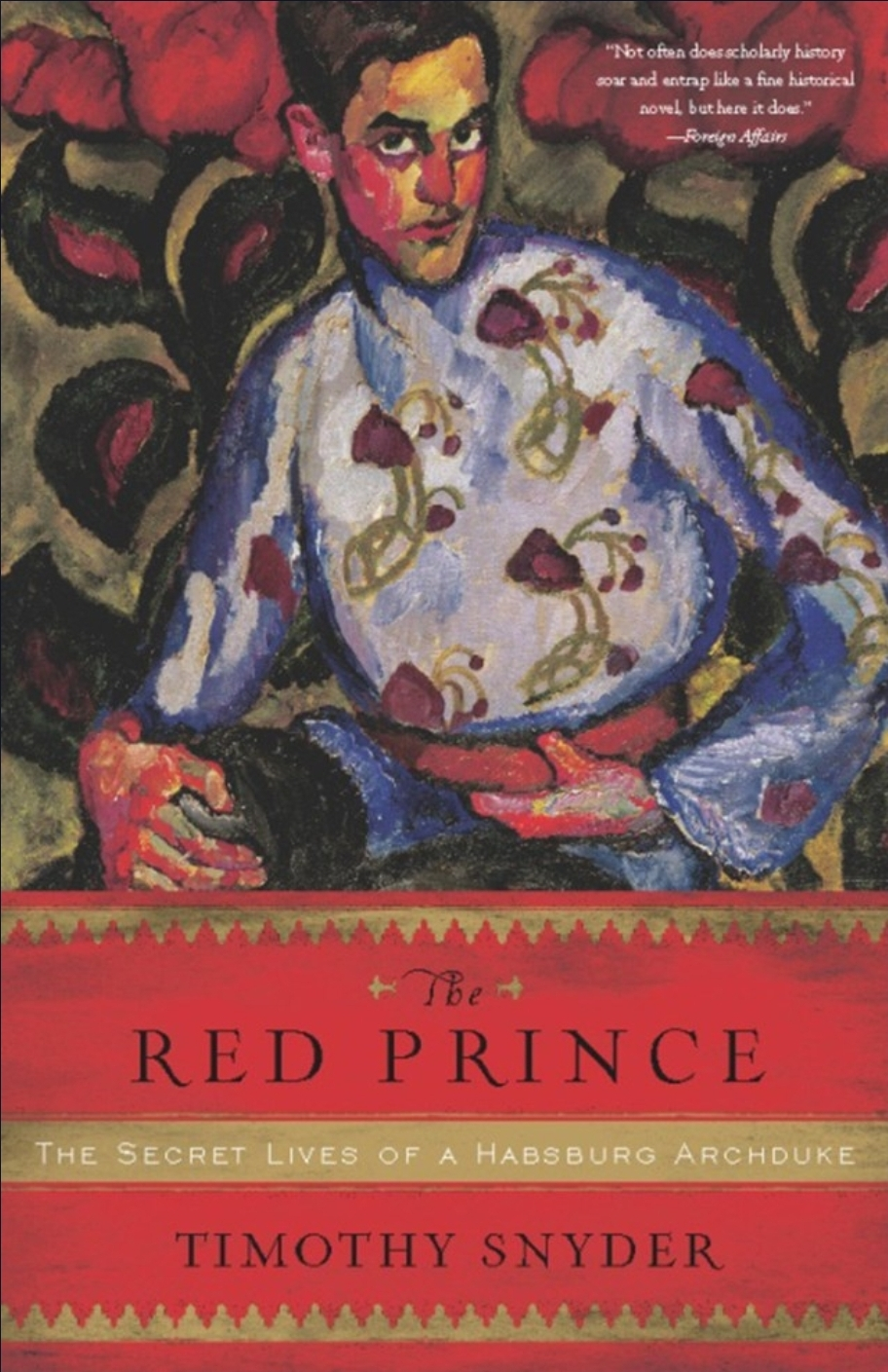
- Author: Timothy Snyder
- Language: English
- Genre: Biography, History
- Publisher: Basic Books
- Publication date: 2008
- Publication place: United States
- Pages: 344
- ISBN: 9780465018970

The Red Prince: The Secret Lives of a Habsburg Archduke is a 2008 book by Timothy Snyder. It focuses on the life of Wilhelm von Habsburg.
