= Hammer and Rifle =

Book article about the Militarization of the Soviet Union, 1926–1933

2000 dust cover image

Hammer and Rifle: The Militarization of the Soviet Union, 1926-1933 is a historical account of the Soviet military's role and impact on the Soviet Union economy during the first five year plan. It also covers events immediately prior to this period. This book was written by David R. Stone and published by the University Press of Kansas in September, 2000.

== About the book ==
A substantial assortment of evidentiary resources were assembled by the author to support his view of the Soviet Union's speedy transformation into a "garrison state" under Stalin's imperatives. This emphasis of modernizing and building the military continued after Stalin's death. The book is sparse on factual inaccuracies "despite the plethora of statistical and other information." According to The English Historical Review this work is "based on declassified archival sources...[and] Stone's focus is on planning, finance and equipment. [Hence,] we hear little about the experiences of the common soldiery."

== Reviews ==
The reviews are generally mixed.

Richard Harrison, writing for the journal Parameters says, "As regards its main thesis, Hammer and Rifle is a fine example of scholarly detective work in the often labyrinthine world of the Russian archives in order to produce a valuable study of the prewar Soviet military-industrial complex."

According to John Keep, writing for The English Historical Review, Stone..."expertly dissect[s] the struggles at lower levels of decision-making." And this book "...helps us form a clearer picture of what was really at issue behind the propaganda façade of `socialist construction'..."

Alex G. Marshall, contributing to Europe-Asia Studies, says: this book is a "...vaguely unsatisfactory work that needs to be supplemented by reading other recent material on the same area. For understanding the true influence of [Mikhail] Tukhachevsky in this whole process, for example, the...work of Lennart Samuelson is infinitely superior."
