= Remarque Institute =

Research institute at New York University

The Remarque Institute is an institute at New York University which focuses its research on contemporary Europe. It was founded in 1995 by Professor Tony R. Judt and is named after the German writer Erich Maria Remarque, whose widow, Paulette Goddard, made a major donation to NYU. Its aims are "to support and promote the study and debate on Europe, and to encourage and facilitate communication between Americans and Europeans". Its current director is Stefanos Geroulanos.

== History and context ==
The Remarque Institute was established at New York University in 1995 under the direction of Tony Judt. It is named for the writer Erich Maria Remarque, whose widow Paulette Goddard made a major donation to the University.

== Activities ==
The Remarque Institute organizes workshops, conferences and events to achieve its goals. Its various activities are organized by its academic team as well as by researchers and professors from the largest European and American universities.
