= Black Earth: The Holocaust as History and Warning =

Book by Timothy Snyder

- First edition (US)
- Author: Timothy Snyder
- Language: English
- Subject: The Holocaust
- Publisher: Tim Duggan Books (US); The Bodley Head (UK)
- Publication date: 2015
- Publication place: United States
- Pages: xiii, 462 pages
- ISBN: 9781101903452

Black Earth: The Holocaust as History and Warning is a 2015 book by historian Timothy Snyder.

== Summary ==
Black Earth offers a "radically new explanation" of the Holocaust. The title is drawn from the fertile black earth of Ukraine, the region where Adolf Hitler planned to replace the population with Germans, giving the German "race" new "living space" (German: Lebensraum). Race, and the idea of the world as a space in which races compete and stronger races replace weaker ones, was, according to Snyder, central to Hitler's thinking. Hitler, according to Snyder, was not a nationalist. Rather, he saw nationalism and sovereign states as tools, useful to achieving his goal of eliminating government and enabling a pure, natural order in which races struggle and only the strongest survive. According to Snyder, Hitler saw Jews as obstacles because the ideas enabling individual humans to view one another as human beings originated with the Jews, and it is the humanitarian ideas perpetuated by Jews that prevents the world from reverting to its natural order. According to Snyder, in Hitler's mind, the way to enable the natural world of brutal racial competition to exist was to eliminate the Jews.

== Critical reception ==
The book began to excite controversy as soon as it was published. It received a mixed review by historian Richard J. Evans in The Guardian. Conservative political commentator Helen Andrews writing in First Things gave it a mostly negative review.

== Reception ==
- Gustav Ranis International Book Prize for best book
- New York Times Editors' Choice
- Publishers Weekly's 10 Best Books of 2015
- The Economist's Best Books of 2015
- The Washington Post's Notable Nonfiction Books of 2015
