= The Road to Unfreedom =

2018 book by Timothy Snyder

The Road to Unfreedom: Russia, Europe, America
- First edition
- Author: Timothy Snyder
- Language: English
- Subject: Russia, democracy
- Published: 2018
- Publisher: Tim Duggan Books
- Publication place: United States
- ISBN: 9780525574460

The Road to Unfreedom: Russia, Europe, America is a 2018 book by Timothy Snyder. In it, Snyder explores Russian attempts to influence Western democracies and the influence of philosopher Ivan Ilyin on Russian President Vladimir Putin and the Russian Federation in general.

== Reviews ==
Historian Margaret MacMillan writing for The New York Times calls the book a "good wake up call", while Tim Adams in a review for The Guardian describes the book as "persuasive", "chilling and unignorable" and a review in Fair Observer calls it an "important addition to the literature explaining current events" and rising authoritarianism.

Other reviewers dismissed the book as a "current liberal narrative", a paranoia "that has emerged among liberals in Trump's wake", misrepresenting Ivan Ilyin and overestimating the influence of Russia in the United States and United Kingdom.

According to the WorldCat, the book has been translated into 13 languages: German, Spanish, Romanian, Russian, Korean, Dutch, Norwegian, Czech, Polish, Hungarian, Japanese, and also in Finnish and Croatian. It was translated into Ukrainian in 2020.
