= Kazimierz Kelles-Krauz =

Polish philosopher and sociologist

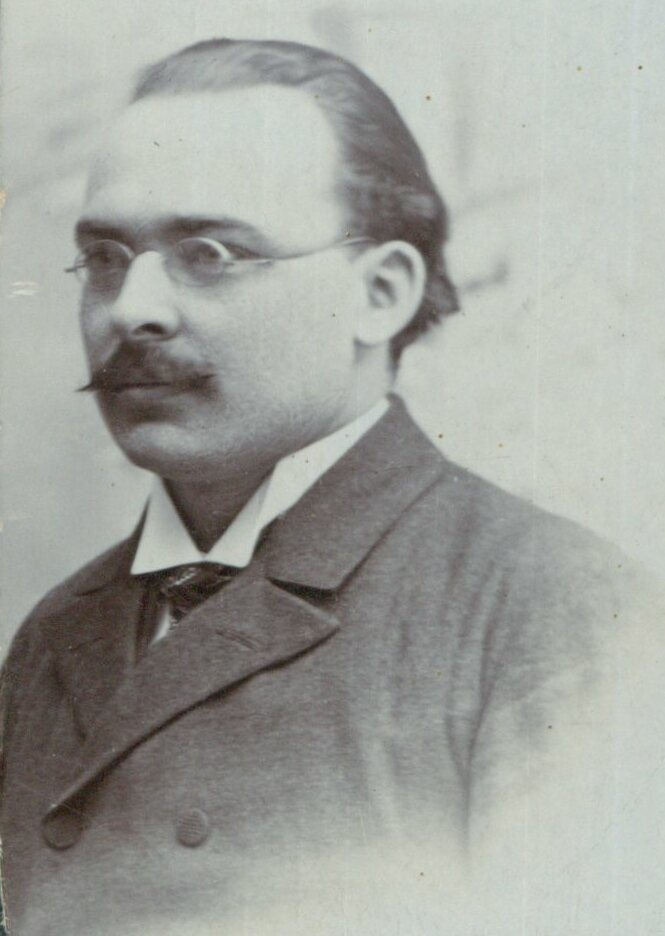
- Born: Kazimierz Radosław Elehard; March 27, 1872; Szczebrzeszyn, Congress Poland, Russian Empire
- Died: June 24, 1905 (aged 33); Pernitz, Austria-Hungary
- Other names: Radosław; Michał Luśnia
- Spouse: Maria Katarzyna née Goldsteyn
- Children: Janina
- Relatives: Piotr Wysocki (uncle)
- Family: Kelles-Krauz szlachta
- Awards: Cross of Independence

Education
- Education: University of Warsaw; University of Paris
- Alma mater: Sciences Po; New University of Brussels

Philosophical work
- Era: 19th-century philosophy
- Region: Central Europe
- School: Marxism
- Institutions: International Institute of Sociology
- Notable ideas: Law of retrospective revolution

Kazimierz Radosław Elehard baron Kelles-Krauz (22 March 1872 – 24 June 1905) was a Polish philosopher, sociologist, and socialist associated with the Polish Socialist Party. He was considered one of the leading Marxist intellectuals of the late nineteenth century.

Kelles-Krauz was born in Szczebrzeszyn, Russian Poland, and died in Pernitz, Austria-Hungary.

His greatest contribution to sociology is the "law of retrospective revolution" according to which "the ideals with which each reform movement tries to replace existing social norms are always similar to the norms of a more or less distant past".

Yale's Timothy Snyder argues that Kelles-Krauz, writing two decades before Hans Kohn and Carlton Hayes, ought to be among the small cluster of turn-of-the-century thinkers regarded as the pioneers of the modern study of nationalism.

== Family ==
He was the son of nobleman and landowner Michał Wilhelm Elehard Kelles-Krauz and Matylda Daniewska. He had three younger brothers, Jan Jakub, Bohdan, Stanisław Maciej and sister Matylda. His youngest brother Stanisław Maciej was also a PPS activist, senator of the Second Polish Republic (1928-30) and Polish ambassador to Denmark after the Second World War, married to PPS activist Maria Helena Nynkowska.

Kazimierz married PPS activist Maria Katarzyna Goldsteyn, with whom he had a daughter, Janina, a workers' activist and employee of the Ossolineum.
