= Lennart Samuelson =

Lennart Samuelson is an economic historian who works for the Stockholm Institute of Transition Economics. His research focuses on the Soviet Union's economic history.

== Works ==
- Samuelson, Lennart (2000). Plans For Stalin's War Machine: Tukhachevskii and Military-Economic Planning, 1925-1941. Palgrave Macmillan. ISBN 978-0-312-22527-8.
- Samuelson, L. (2011). Tankograd: The Formation of a Soviet Company Town: Cheliabinsk, 1900s-1950s. Springer. ISBN 978-0-230-31666-9.
