= Jerzy Jedlicki =

Polish historian of ideas (1930–2018)

- Born: June 14, 1930; Warsaw, Second Polish Republic
- Died: January 31, 2018 (aged 87); Warsaw, Poland
- Education: University of Warsaw
- Occupation: Historian of ideas
- Awards: Prize of the Foundation for Polish Science (2015); Order of Polonia Restituta (2011); Jerzy Giedroyc Prize (2009)

Jerzy Jedlicki (born Jerzy Grossman 14 June 1930 in Warsaw – 31 January 2018 in Warsaw) was a Polish historian of ideas, Humanities Professor and an anti-communist activist during the times of the Polish People's Republic.

== Life and work ==
Born into an assimilated Jewish family, he graduated in sociology from the University of Warsaw in 1952. In 1989, he was granted the title of a Humanities Professor. He worked at the Institute of History of the Polish Academy of Sciences (PAN). He specialized in the history of the culture of the 18th-20th centuries as well as social history. He was also a member of the Warsaw-based Collegium Invisibile.

Since 1948, he was a member of the Union of Youth Struggle and later the Polish Youth Union (ZMP). Between 1952 and 1968 he was a member of the communist Polish United Workers' Party (Polish: Polska Zjednoczona Partia Robotnicza, PZPR) which he left as a sign of protest against the so-called March events of 1968. He was the only member of the Institute of History of PAN who decided to resign from the membership of the ruling communist party in Poland at that time. He took part in the discussions at the Crooked Circle Club and was a signatory of the 101 Memorial, an initiative of Polish intellectuals aimed against changes to the Constitution of Poland of 1952. Since 1977, he dealt with organizing meetings of the Flying University. He was the founder, lecturer and member of the Scientific Training Association. He collaborated with the Student Committee of Solidarity and participated in the Doświadczenie i Przyszłość ("Experience and Future") discussion group. In 1980, he became a member of the Solidarity movement. After the imposition of the Martial law in Poland he was interned since December 1981 until July 1982. He published articles in opposition magazines such as Tygodnik Mazowsze.

After the fall of communism in Poland, he became involved in the activities of PEN Club. He was appointed a member of the supervisory board of the Polish Information Agency and chairman of the "Open Res Publica" Association Against Anti-Seminitsm and Xenophobia.

In 2009, he was awarded (together with Maciej Janowski and Magdalena Micińska) the Jerzy Giedroyc Prize for their collaborative work entitled Dzieje inteligencji polskiej do roku 1918 ("The History of the Polish Intelligentsia until 1918"). In 2011, President Bronisław Komorowski awarded him with the Commander's Cross of the Order of Polonia Restituta. In 2015, he received the Prize of the Foundation for Polish Science in the humanities and social sciences category for his "fundamental studies on the phenomenon of the intelligentsia as a social stratum and its role in modernization processes in Central and Eastern Europe".

He died on 31 January 2018 and was buried at the Powązki Military Cemetery in Warsaw.

== Selected publications ==
- Klejnot i bariery społeczne: przeobrażenia szlachectwa polskiego w schyłkowym okresie feudalizmu, Warsaw 1968
- Jakiej cywilizacji Polacy potrzebują: studia z dziejów idei i wyobraźni XIX wieku, PWN, Warsaw 1988
- Źle urodzeni, czyli o doświadczeniu historycznym, Aneks, London 1993
- Świat zwyrodniały. Lęki i wyroki krytyków nowoczesności, Sic!, Warsaw 2000
- Błędne koło 1832–1864, (collaborative work: Dzieje inteligencji polskiej do roku 1918), Institute of History PAN, Warsaw 2008
- Droga do narodowej klęski, Warsaw 2013

== See also ==
- Solidarity movement
- Prize of the Foundation for Polish Science
- Copernicus Award
