= Tourism in Saône-et-Loire =

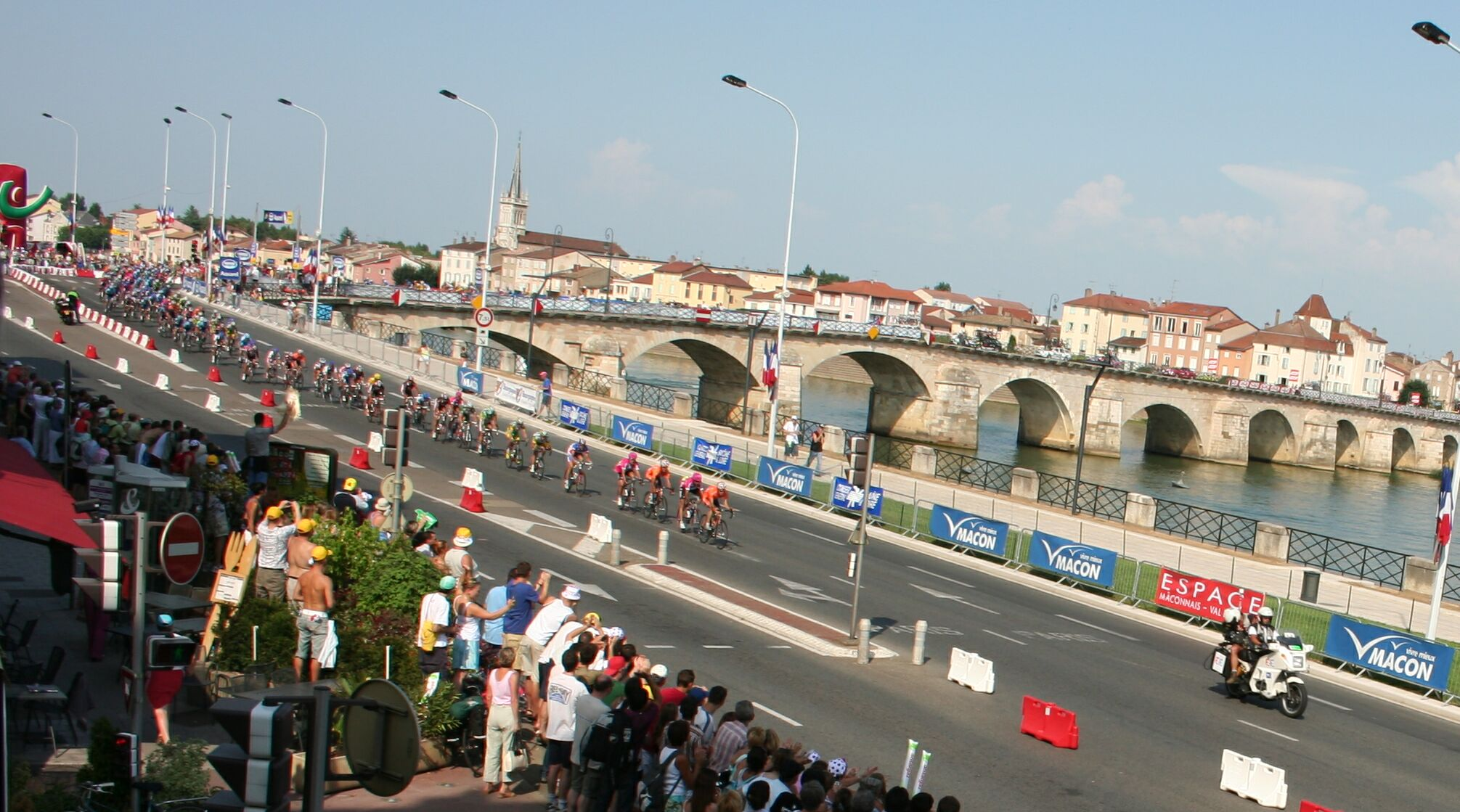
The Tour de France in Mâcon

Saône-et-Loire is one of the four departments of Burgundy. Tourism in this region is founded on its varied landscape (the Saône plain, the Mâconnais, and the Charolais), its gastronomy with the prestigious mâconnais wines, the charolais beef, the poulet de Bresse (Bresse chicken), and its rich architectural sites, (Autun, Cluny, Paray-le-Monial, and Tournus)

== Sights ==
=== Natural sites ===
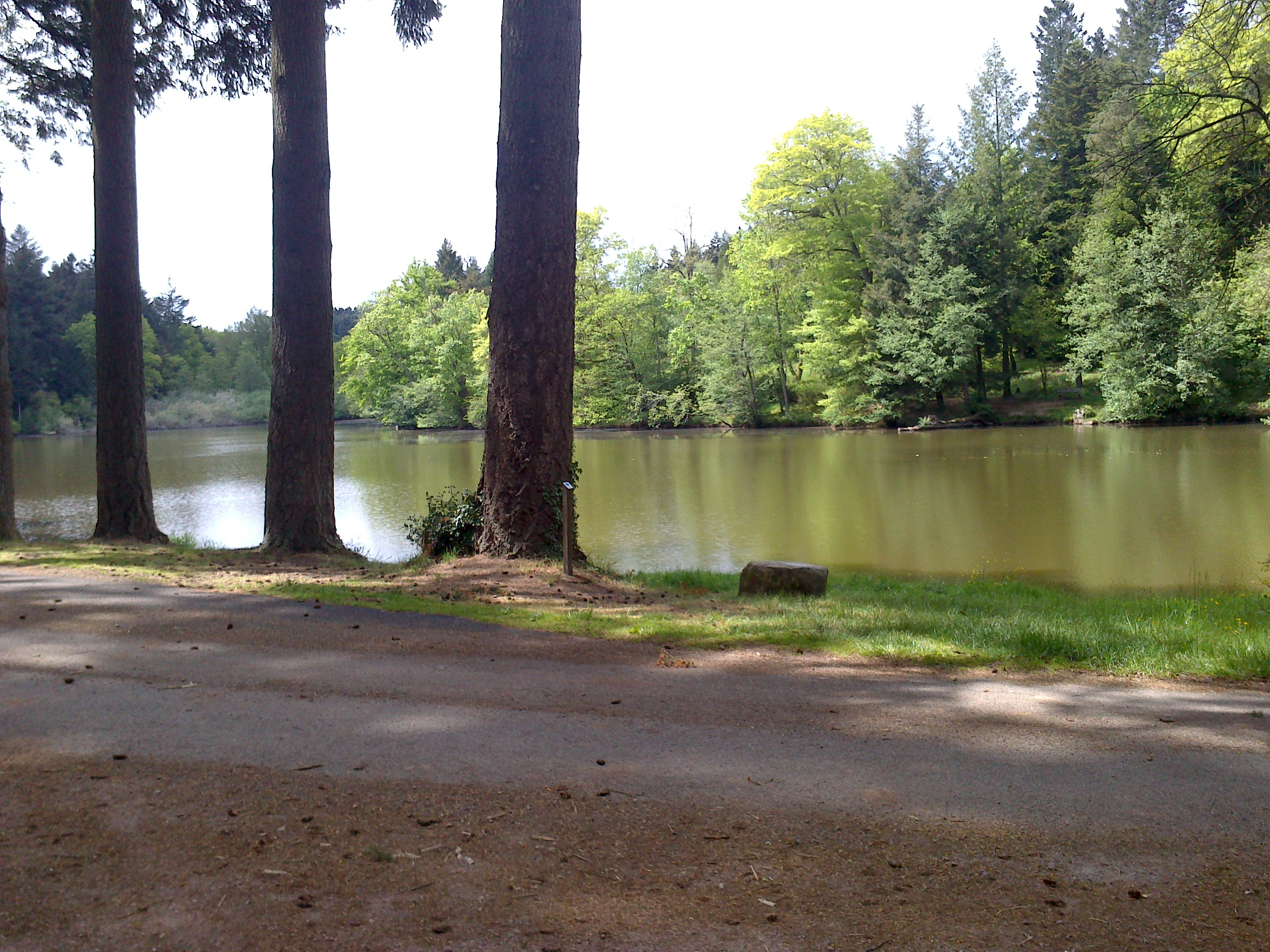
Arboretum de Pézanin

- The Arboretum de Pézanin,
- Azé's grottes
- The Régional Natural Park of the Morvan
- The Saint-Cyr Mount, the top of southern Burgundy
- The Roche de Solutré

=== Cities and villages ===
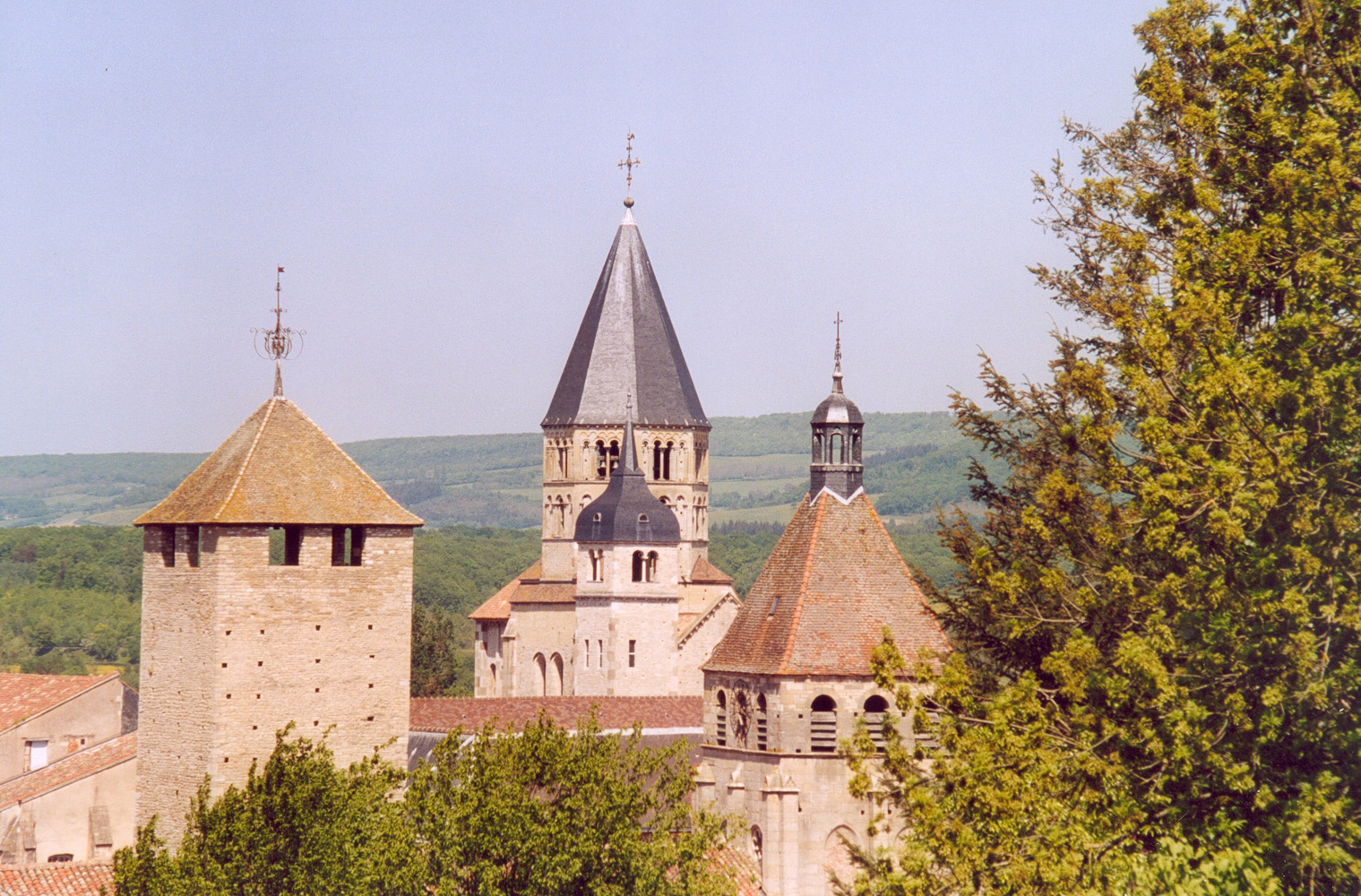
Cluny

- Mâcon, city in wine site
- Charolles, cradle of the charolais beef
- Autun, Morvan's door
- Berzé-le-Châtel, strengthen village
- Cluny, and its millennium abbey
- Dompierre-les-Ormes, with the ‘’Galerie Européenne de la Forêt et du bois’’ and the Arboretum de Pézanin

=== Public opened castle ===
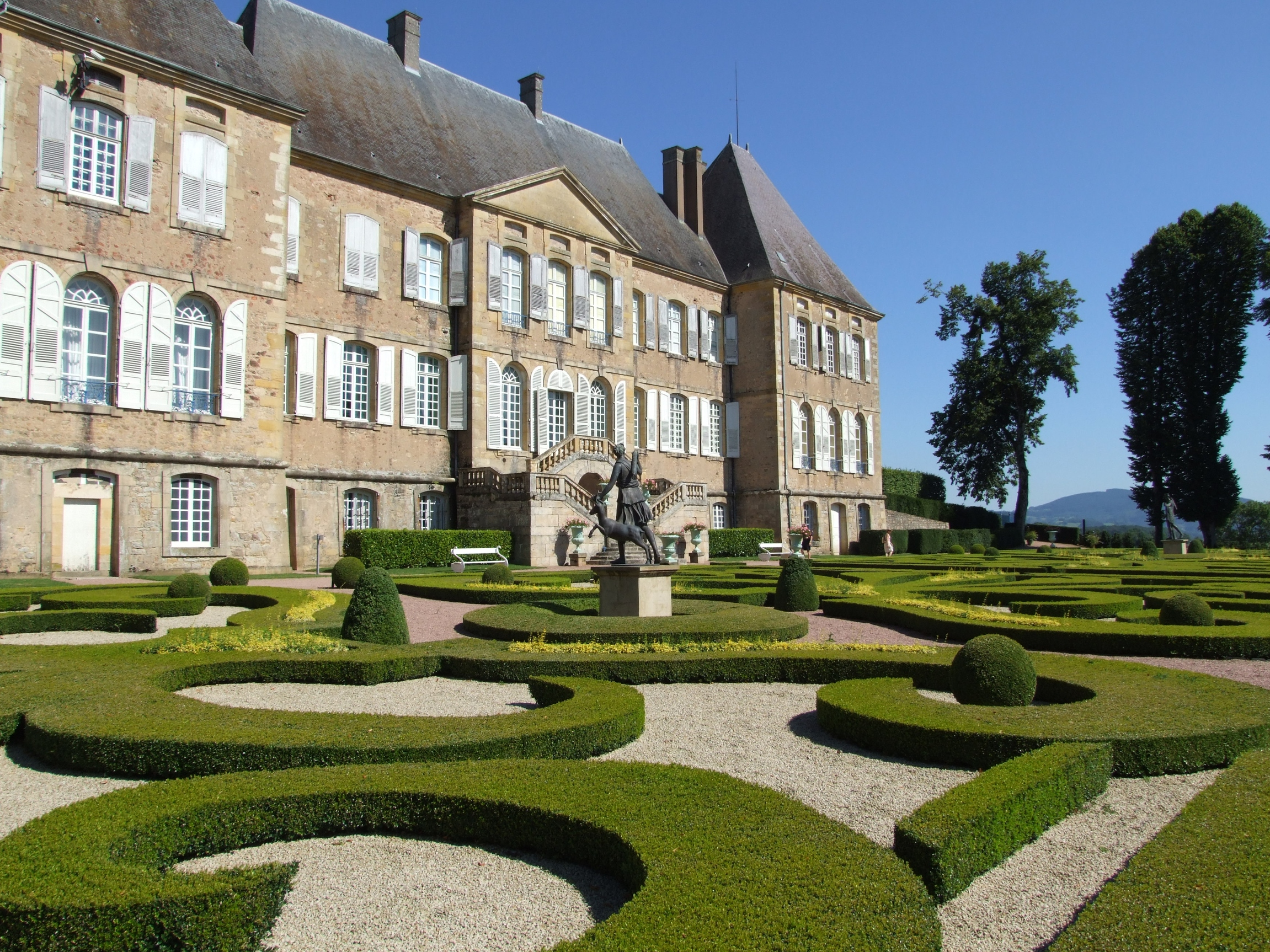
Château de Drée, garden

- Château de Sully
- Château de Pierreclos
- Château de Cormatin
- Château de Drée
- Château de Saint-Point
- Château de Couches
- Château de Pierre-de-Bresse

=== Important tourist sites ===
- The Galerie européenne de la forêt et du bois (European Gallery of forest and wood)
- The Cluny abbey, et the Haras of Cluny,
- The Taizé community,
- EuroVelo 6 and green ways
- Wine: the hameau Dubœuf, in Romanèche-Thorins, wines of the chalonais and maconnais

=== Wine ===
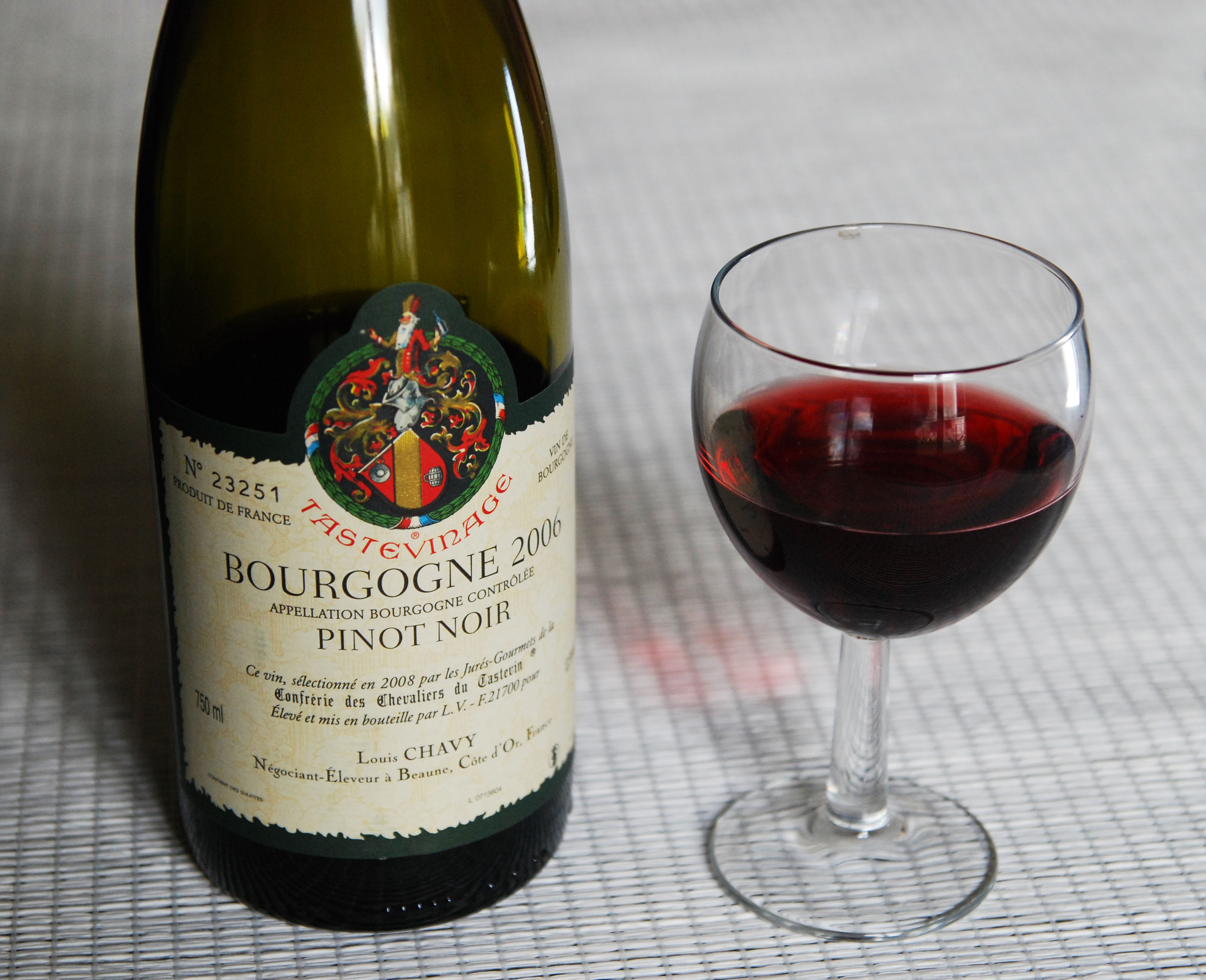
Bourgogne wine

Mâconnais :

Chalonnais :

=== Most visited sites ===
| 26 Sites most visited in southern Burgundy | Location | Number of visitors in 2013 | Type |
|---|---|---|---|
| Basilica of Paray-le-Monial (free) | Paray-le-Monial | 475,000 | Church |
| Abbaye Saint Philibert | Tournus | 220,000 | Abbey |
| Parc des Combes | Le Creusot | 165,000 | Amusement park |
| Touroparc Zoo | Romanèche-Thorins | 155,499 | Amusement park |
| Musée d'Art et d'Archéologie et Abbaye de Cluny | Cluny | 128,088 | Abbey site |
| Hameau du vin | Romanèche-Thorins | 119,759 | Wine village |
| Communauté de Taizé | Taizé | 111,630 | Religious community |
| Château de Cormatin | Cormatin | 58,612 | Chateau |
| Temple des mille Bouddhas | La Boulaye | 50,000 | Buddhist temple |
| Cathédrale Saint Lazare | Autun | 50,000 | Cathedral |
| Musée Bibracte | Saint-Léger-sous-Beuvray | 40,623 | Muaeum |
| Ecomusée de la Bresse | Pierre-de-Bresse | 36,178 | Museum |
| Acrogivry | Givry | 27,103 | |
| Musée de la Préhistoire de Solutré | Solutré | 26,958 | Museum |
| Musée Nicéphore-Niépce | Chalon-sur-Saône | 26,238 | Photography museum |
| Diverti'Parc | Toulon-sur-Arroux | 26,000 | Amuesement parks |
| Arboretum de Pézanin (free) | Dompierre-les-Ormes | 25,000 | Arboretum |
| Château de Couches | Couches | 24,259 | Chateau |
| Château de Sully | Sully | 24,095 | Chateau |
| Grottes d'Azé | Azé | 23,095 | Cave |
| Brancion | | 23,100 | Medieval village |
| Musée Rolin | Autun | 18,226 | Museum |
| Haras national de Cluny | Cluny | 18,189 | |
| Centre EDEN | Cuisery | 15,884 | |
| Château de Pierreclos | Pierreclos | 15,429 | Chateau |
| Galerie européenne de la forêt et du bois (free 1st Sunday of ever month) | Dompierre-les-Ormes | 15,154 | |
