= Kwiek =

Kwiek is a Polish surname. Notable people with the surname include:

- Aleksander Kwiek (born 1983), Polish footballer
- Dawid Kwiek (born 1988), Polish footballer
- Janusz Kwiek, crowned as Janos I, King of the Gypsies, in 1937
- Julian Kwiek, Polish historian
- Marcos Kwiek (born 1967), Brazilian volleyball coach
- Pawel Kwiek (1951–2022), Polish cinematographer
