= Anti-Jewish violence in Poland, 1944–1946 =

Post-WW2 pogroms and massacres of Jews in Poland

Anti-Jewish violence in Poland from 1944 to 1946 preceded and followed the end of World War II in Europe and influenced the postwar history of the Jews and Polish-Jewish relations. It occurred amid a period of violence and anarchy across the country caused by lawlessness and anti-communist resistance against the Soviet-backed communist takeover of Poland. The estimated number of Jewish victims varies, ranging up to 2,000. In 2021, Julian Kwiek published the first scientific register of incidents and victims of anti-Jewish violence in Poland from 1944 to 1947; according to Kwiek's calculations, the number of victims was 1,074 to 1,121. Jews constituted between two and three percent of the total number of victims of postwar violence in the country, including Polish Jews who managed to escape the Holocaust in territories of Poland annexed by the Soviet Union, and returned after the border changes imposed by the Allies at the Yalta Conference. Incidents ranged from individual attacks to pogroms.

Jewish emigration from Poland surged, partly as a result of this violence but also because Poland was the only Eastern Bloc country to allow free Jewish emigration (aliyah) to Mandatory Palestine. By contrast, the Soviet Union brought Soviet Jews from DP camps back to the USSR by force. Uninterrupted traffic across the Polish borders intensified, with many Jews passing through on their way west or south. In January 1946, 86,000 survivors were registered with the Central Committee of Polish Jews (CKŻP). By the end of summer, the number had risen to 205,000 to 210,000 (with 240,000 registrations and over 30,000 duplicates). About 180,000 Jewish refugees came from the Soviet Union after the repatriation agreement. Most left without visas or exit permits, thanks to a decree from General Marian Spychalski. By the spring of 1947, only 90,000 Jews lived in Poland.

According to Polish historian Lukasz Krzyzanowski, the violence and its causes have become politicized. Krzyzanowski says that the attribution of antisemitic motives to all attackers, or ascribing all anti-Jewish violence to ordinary criminality, is reductionist; in many cases, however, "the Jewishness of the victims was unquestionably the chief, if not the sole, motive for the crime". Tens of thousands of people were killed in Poland's two-year civil war, also due to indiscriminate postwar lawlessness and abject poverty. Among Jewish victims were functionaries of the new Stalinist regime, assassinated by the "cursed soldiers" of the anti-communist underground due to their political loyalties. Their percentage was not large, however; among the victims recorded by Julian Kwiek were only 84 people identified with the new government. Jan T. Gross noted that "only a fraction of [the Jewish] deaths could be attributed to antisemitism" and anti-Jewish violence caused panic among Jews not so much because of its intensity and spread, but because of the "atmosphere of widespread anti-Semitism" they experienced after the end of the war. Resentment of returning Jews by some local Poles included concerns that they would reclaim their property.

== Background ==
=== Property claims and restitution ===
"On Abandoned Real Estate", a 6 May 1945 restitution law, allowed property owners who had been dispossessed or their relatives and heirs to reclaim private property under a simplified inheritance procedure. The law was in effect until the end of 1948. An expedited court process, with minimal costs, was put in place to handle claims. Applications had to be examined within 21 days, and many claims were processed the day they were filed. The Communist government enacted legislation on "abandoned property", placing severe limitations not present in pre-war inheritance law (which allowed inheritance by second-degree relatives) and limiting restitution to the original owners or direct heirs. The initial 1945 decrees were superseded by a 1946 law with a claim deadline of 31 December 1947 (later extended to 31 December 1948), after which property devolved to the Polish state. Even if Jews regained de jure control, additional lengthy proceedings were required when it was occupied by Poles. Most Jewish claimants could not afford the restitution process without financial help, due to filing costs, legal fees, and inheritance tax.

Jewish property was unclaimed because some Jews were murdered when they sought to reclaim family property and most Jews left postwar Poland. The murders intimidated Jews against filing claims. Unclaimed Jewish property devolved to the Polish state on 31 December 1948, but many Jews who had fled to the Soviet Union were not repatriated until after that date. Polish legislation in 1947 severely restricted intestate succession, limiting inheritance by distant family members. Jews who returned to Poland from the Soviet Union and settled in territories Poland acquired from Germany were entitled to material compensation on an equal footing with ethnic Poles who were displaced from eastern Poland. Although it is difficult to estimate how many Jews got their property back, the number was probably few.

=== Holocaust survivors and returnees ===
Polish Jewish survivors of the Nazi Holocaust who returned home were fearful of being physically assaulted, robbed and murdered. The situation was complicated by the fact that there were more Jewish survivors returning from the Soviet Union than those who survived in occupied Poland.

Members of the former Communist Party of Poland (KPP) returned home from the Soviet Union as functionaries of the new regime. Among them were a number of Poles of Jewish origin, who became active in the Polish Workers' Party, the Polish United Workers' Party and the Ministry of Public Security. They included Hilary Minc, third in command in Bolesław Bierut's political apparatus and Jakub Berman, head of State Security Services, who was considered Joseph Stalin's right-hand man in Poland between 1944 and 1953. Jewish representation in Bierut's apparatus of political oppression was higher than their proportion of the general Polish population. It was hypothesized that Stalin had intentionally employed some in positions of repressive authority (such as Roman Romkowski and director of the Special Bureau Anatol Fejgin) to put non-Jewish and Jewish Poles "on a collision course." A study by the Polish Institute of National Remembrance indicated that between 1944 and 1954, 37.1 percent of the ministry's 450 directors were Jewish. The underground anti-communist press held them responsible for the murder of Polish opponents of the regime.

=== Anti-communist armed resistance ===
As the victory over Nazi Germany was celebrated in the West in May 1945, Polish partisans attacked country offices of the PUBP, MO (communist state police), UB and NKVD (which employed a number of Jewish functionaries; up to 80 percent of the officers and 50 percent of the militiamen in Lublin and up to 75 percent of the officers in Silesia were Jewish. According to Eisenstein's estimates, 90 percent of the Jewish functionaries at the state security office in Katowice changed their names to Polish ones after 10 November 1945 for anonymity. In May 1945, public security offices were destroyed by the anti-communist underground in Krasnosielc and Annówka (1 May), Kuryłówka (7 May), Grajewo and Białystok (9 May), Siemiatycze and Wyrzyki (11 May), Ostrołęka and Rembertów (18–21 May), Biała Podlaska (21 and 24 May), Majdan-Topiło (Białowieża Forest, 28 May), and Kotki (Busko-Zdrój) (28 May). Several hundred or more political prisoners were freed, many of whom were later recaptured and murdered. The human-rights violations and abuse of power by the ministry strengthened anti-Jewish sentiments, adding to the Żydokomuna stereotype with Poles who generally had anti-Communist and anti-Soviet attitudes. Accusations that Jews were supportive of the communist regime and were a threat to Poland also came from high officials of the Catholic Church.

The provisions of the Yalta Conference allowed Stalin to forcibly return Jewish refugees and Soviet nationals from DP camps to the USSR "irrespective of their personal wishes". The former Polish citizens, the second-largest refugee group in the West, did not began to return until late 1946. Polish–Jewish DPs (25 percent of their total at the beginning of 1947) were declared non-repatriable (due, in part, to US pressure), which forced the British government to open the borders of Palestine. By the spring of 1947, the number of Jews in Poland (largely from the Soviet Union) declined from 240,000 to 90,000 due to mass migration and the post-Holocaust absence of Jewish life in Poland. The flight of Jews was motivated by civil war in Poland and the efforts of a strong Polish-Jewish lobby at the Jewish Agency working towards a higher standard of living and special privileges for immigrants from Poland. Yitzhak Raphael, director of the Immigration Department (who lobbied on behalf of Polish refugees), insisted on their preferential treatment in Israel.

Reports of political repression by Communist forces in Poland and political murders by security forces under Soviet control were mounting. Arthur Bliss Lane, United States ambassador to Poland, was troubled by the mass arrests of Polish non-Communists and their intimidation by security police. The wave of state-sponsored terror and large-scale deportations was followed by the January 1946 nationalization decree. In response to his protests, Bierut told Lane to "mind his own business."

== Pogroms ==
The prewar Polish intelligentsia ceased to exist. Of a 1946 population of 23.7 million, only 40,000 university graduates (less than 0.2 percent of the general population) survived the war. Between 1944 and 1956, 350,000 to 400,000 Poles were held in Stalinist prisons. Sporadic anti-Jewish disturbances or riots were sparked by blood libel accusations against Jews in Kraków, Kielce, Bytom, Białystok, Bielawa, Częstochowa, Legnica, Otwock, Rzeszów, Sosnowiec, Szczecin, and Tarnów. Acts of anti-Jewish violence were also recorded in villages and small towns in central Poland, where the overwhelming majority of attacks occurred. According to Bozena Szaynok, the perpetrators of antisemitic acts were seldom punished.

The Kraków pogrom of 11 August 1945 was the first antisemitic riot in postwar Poland and resulted in the shooting death of Róża Berger, who was hiding from security forces. The riot was caused by a rumour that the bodies of Christian children were hidden in Kupa Synagogue. Jews were attacked in Kazimierz and other parts of the city's Old Town, and a fire was set in Kupa Synagogue. One hundred forty-five people were arrested including 40 militiamen and six Polish Armed Forces soldiers. In September and October 1945, about 25 of those arrested were charged and 10 were imprisoned. Shortly after the Kielce pogrom, violence against Jews in Poland ceased.

=== Kielce pogrom ===
A pogrom, the causes of which remain controversial, began in Kielce on 4 July 1946. It had been rumoured that a Polish boy was kidnapped by Jews but escaped, and other Polish children were ritually murdered by Jews. According to Robert B. Pynsent, this ignited a violent public reaction directed at the Jewish Center.^{:96} Attacks on the city's Jewish residents were also provoked by units of the communist militia and the Soviet-controlled Polish Army, who confirmed rumors of the kidnapping. Police and soldiers were the first to fire shots at Jews.

Forty-two people were killed in the Kielce pogrom, and about 50 were seriously injured. According to Michael R. Marrus, it was a turning point for the postwar history of Polish Jews as the Zionist underground concluded that there was no future for Jews in Europe. Marian Spychalski signed a decree soon afterwards which allowed Jews to leave Poland without visas or exit permits, and Jewish emigration from Poland increased substantially. Almost 20,000 Jews left Poland in July 1946, and there were approximately 12,000 Jews left by September of that year. Britain demanded that Poland and other countries halt the Jewish exodus, but their pressure was largely unsuccessful.

== Number of victims ==
A statistical compendium of "Jewish deaths by violence for which specific record is extant, by month and province" was compiled by David Engel for the Yad Vashem Shoah Resource Center's International School for Holocaust Studies. The study was the starting point for a 1973 report by historian Lucjan Dobroszycki, who wrote that he had "analyzed records, reports, cables, protocols and press-cuttings of the period pertaining to anti-Jewish assaults and murders in 115 localities" in which about 300 Jewish deaths had been documented.

A number of historians, including Antony Polonsky and Jan T. Gross, cite the figures which originated in Dobroszycki's 1973 work. Dobroszycki wrote that "according to general estimates 1,500 Jews lost their lives in Poland from liberation until the summer of 1947", although Gross said that only a fraction of the deaths could be attributed to antisemitism and most were due to general postwar disorder, political violence and banditry. Engel wrote that Dobroszycki "offered no reference for such 'general estimates'" which "have not been confirmed by any other investigator" and "no proof-text for this figure" exists, or for Yisrael Gutman's total of 1,000; "both estimates seem high." Other estimates include one by Anna Cichopek that more than 1,000 Jews were murdered in Poland between 1944 and 1947. According to Stefan Grajek, around 1,000 Jews died in the first half of 1946. Historian Tadeusz Piotrowski estimated that between 1944 and 1947, there were 1,500–2,000 Jewish victims of general civil strife associated with the Soviet consolidation of power – two to three percent of the total number of victims of postwar violence in Poland.

According to a 2021 book by Julian Kwiek, 1,074 to 1,121 Jews died as a result of individual and collective violence between 1944 and 1947. They were killed in at least 365 localities, with the vast majority of victims defenseless people (including women and children), and the violence originated in a climate of indifference, aversion and hostility towards the Jews on the part of the local population.

In the Yad Vashem Studies paper, Holocaust historian David Engel wrote:

[Dobroszycki] did not report the results of that analysis except in the most general terms, nor did he indicate the specific sources from which he had compiled his list of cases. Nevertheless, a separate, systematic examination of the relevant files in the archive of the Polish Ministry of Public Administration, supplemented by reports prepared by the United States embassy in Warsaw and by Jewish sources in Poland, as well as by bulletins published by the Central Committee of Polish Jews and the Jewish Telegraphic Agency, has lent credibility to Dobroszycki's claim: it has turned up more or less detailed descriptions of 130 incidents in 102 locations between September 1944 and September 1946, in which 327 Jews lost their lives.

Studying case records, Engel wrote that the compilation of cases is not exhaustive. He suggested that cases of anti-Jewish violence were selectively reported and recorded, and that there was no centralized, systematic effort to record these cases. Engel cited a number of incidental reports of killings of Jews for which no official reports survived, concluding that the figures have "obvious weaknesses"; the records used to compile them are deficient, and lack data from the Białystok region. He cited one source with 108 Jewish deaths during March 1945, and another source showing 351 deaths between November 1944 and December 1945.

== See also ==
- Attack on the NKVD Camp in Rembertów
- Neighbors: The Destruction of the Jewish Community in Jedwabne, Poland
- National Armed Forces

== Bibliography ==
- Semczyszyn, Magdalena (2022). "Violence as the Cause of Jewish Flight from Poland, 1945–1946". Sprawy Narodowościowe. Seria Nowa (54). doi:10.11649/sn.2812. S2CID 260229118.
