= Julia Pirotte =

Polish photojournalist (1907–2000)

- Self-portrait in the mirror, Marseille
- Born: Julia Diament; 26 September 1907; Końskowola, Congress Poland
- Died: 25 July 2000 (aged 92); Warsaw, Poland
- Resting place: Powązki Cemetery
- Occupation: Photojournalist
- Era: 20th century
- Known for: Photography, War Photography, Resistance
- Political party: Communist Party of Poland
- Movement: Communism
- Criminal charges: Political activity
- Criminal penalty: 4 years imprisonment
- Spouses: Jean-Claude Pirotte; Jefim Sokolski
- Parents: Boruch Diament (father); Sura Szejnfeld (mother)
- Military career
- Allegiance: French Communist Party
- Branch: Francs-Tireurs et Partisans
- Service years: 1940–1944
- Unit: FTP-MOI
- Conflicts: Liberation of France

Julia Pirotte (née Diament; 26 September 1907 – 25 July 2000) was a Polish photojournalist known for her work in Marseille during the Second World War when she documented the French Resistance, and for photographs taken in the aftermath of the Kielce Pogrom of 1946.

== Biography ==
=== Early life ===
Born Julia Diament in Końskowola, a town in Congress Poland, she was one of three children – a sister, Mindla Maria Diament and a brother, Majer Diament. She and her siblings were self-taught due to their inability to attend school due to the then-political atmosphere. Diament and her sister were members of the Communist Party of Poland – hostile to the system of the new Polish state, which gained independence after 123 years of partition. She and her sister were persecuted due to their support for communism in Poland after Polish–Soviet War in 1919–1921.

=== Emigration ===
In 1925 she was imprisoned for communist activities. Threatened by another arrest, she emigrated to Belgium in 1934 where she married Jean Pirotte, a labor activist in Brussels, and studied photography. In May 1940, after the German occupation of Belgium and the deportation of her husband, Pirotte made her way to southern France, where she played an active role in Jewish and French resistance groups. Based in Marseille, she worked as a photojournalist for Dimanche Illustré and served as a courier for weapons, false papers and underground publications in a resistance group, the FTP-MOI. During this time she took numerous photographs documenting life under the Vichy Regime. As a member of the Francs-Tireurs et Partisans, she was able to photograph the activities of the Maquis resistance in the summer of 1944 and the liberation of Marseille.

After the war, Pirotte returned to Poland as a photojournalist for the Polish periodical Zolnierz Polski. During that period she covered the aftermath of the Kielce Pogrom of 4 July 1946 and attended the World Congress of Intellectuals in Defense of Peace of 1948 in Wrocław, taking portraits of Pablo Picasso, Irène Joliot-Curie and Dominique Desanti. Pirotte visited Israel in 1957. She later married Jefim Sokolski, a Polish economist who died in 1974.

Pirotte's sister Mindla Maria Diament (1911 – 24 August 1944) was a member of the French Resistance, she was captured and tortured before being deported and executed in Breslau.

=== Legacy ===
In later years, Pirotte frequently traveled to Belgium, France, and the United States, where, in 1984, the International Center of Photography in New York hosted an exhibition of her work.

After the war, she received decorations: The Croix de Guerre 1939–1945 which distinguishes individuals (civilian and military), units, cities or institutions that received a commendation for acts of war during the Second World War and the Order of Arts and Letters in February 1996, whose rewards "persons who have distinguished themselves by their creation in the artistic or literary field or by the contribution they have made to the influence of the arts and letters in France and in the world".

In 2025, her life was the subject of the documentary film You Have Courage, Madame (directed by Asaf Galay). The film follows two contemporary photographers retracing Pirotte's journey and incorporates her personal testimony regarding her activities during World War II.

== Personal life ==
Julia married Jean-Claude Pirotte in 1935, which helped her gain Belgian citizenship.

== Photographs in the collections ==
Pirotte ceased her professional activities in March 1968. However, from 1980 her work aroused enthusiasm and brought her fame. She then exhibited in Poland, London, Charleroi, Stockholm, and New York song other locations. Pirotte's photographs are included in the permanent collections of several European and American museums:

- Bibliothèque nationale de France, Paris, France
- Musée de la photographie at Charleroi (B)
- Musée Nicéphore Niépce, Chalon-sur-Saône, France
- Fotografiska, Stockholm, Sweden
- National Museum, Wrocław, Poland
- Museum of Art, Łódź, Poland
- United States Holocaust Memorial Museum, Washington, USA
- International Center of Photography, New York City, USA
- The Photographers' Gallery, London, England
- Bibliothèque universitaire de Nanterre, Nanterre, France
- Ministry of Armed Forces, Paris, France
- Army Museum, Paris, France
- National Association of Veterans and Friends of the Resistance, Marseille, France
- Mémorial de la Shoah, Paris, France
- Fotomuseum Antwerp, Antwerp, Belgium
- AWARE: Archives of Women Artists, Research and Exhibitions, Paris, France
