= Ruère =

Hamlet in Burgundy, France

Coordinates: 46°19′38″N 4°40′30″E

Ruère is a hamlet surrounded by vineyards, situated above Pierreclos (Saône-et-Loire) next to Mâcon, in the south of Burgundy in France. There are approximately fifty inhabitants.
