= Warszauera Street =

Street in Kraków, Kazimierz

Warszauera street
Kraków
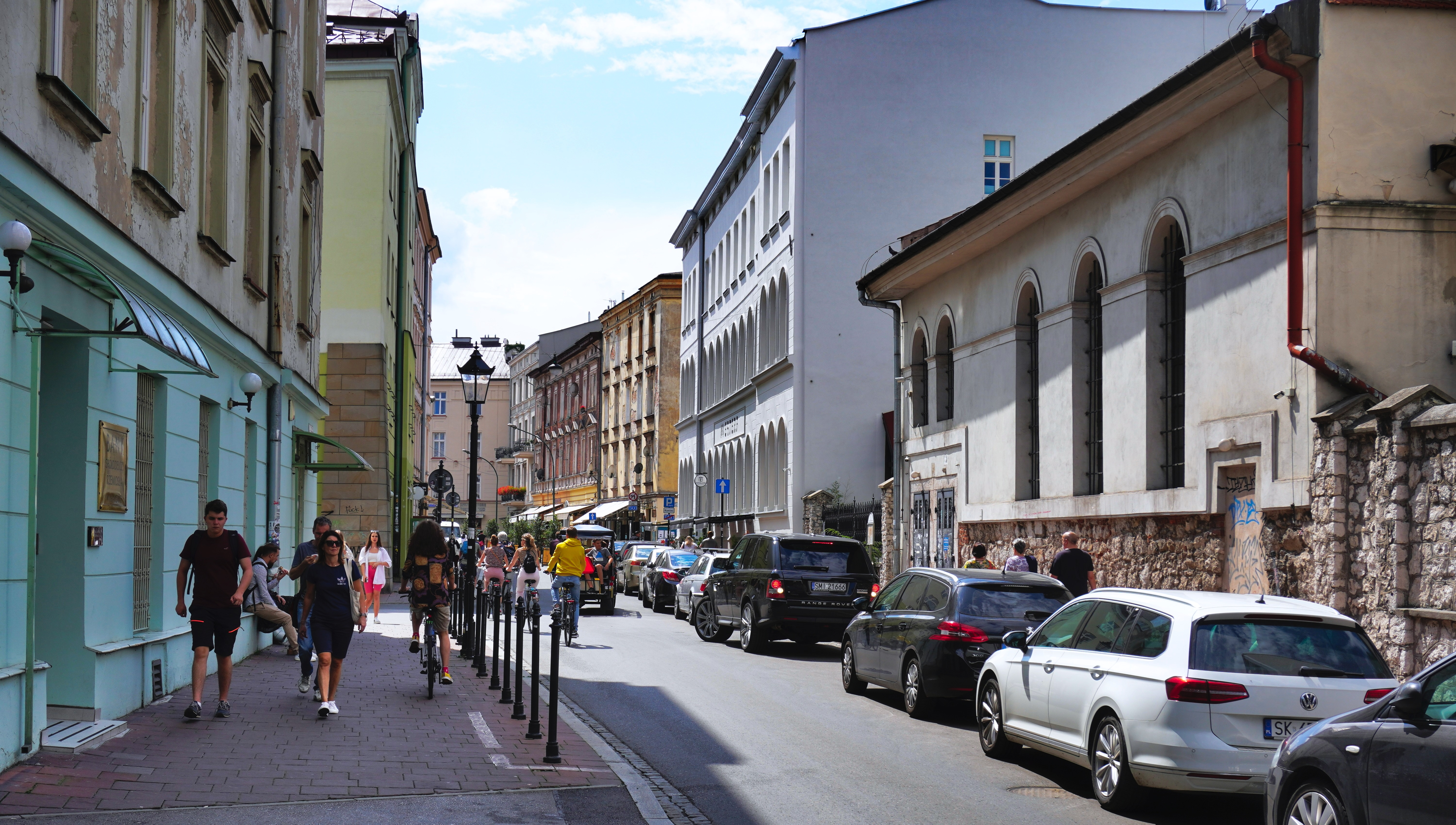
- View from the intersection with Jakuba Street looking west
- Interactive map of Warszauera street
- Part of: Kraków Old Town district
- Owner: City of Kraków
- Location: Kraków, Poland

Warszauera Street in Kraków is a street in Kraków, in District I Old Town, in Kazimierz. It connects Estery Street and Nowy Square with Jakuba Street and the area of the Remah Cemetery.

== History ==
Until the 19th century, a hospital and an old people's home were located on this street. The name Warszauera Street was established in 1908, derived from the surname of Jonathan Warschauer, a physician and social activist of Jewish origin associated with Kraków. Previously, it was called Ubogich Street.

== Buildings ==
- 1 Warszauera Street (8 Estery Street) – Tenement house, early 20th century.
- 2 Warszauera Street (6 Estery Street) – Tenement house. Designed by Leopold Tlachna, 1909.
- 8 Warszauera Street (27 Miodowa Street) – Kupa Synagogue, circa 1635.
- 9 Warszauera Street (2 Kupa Street) – Tenement house. Designed by Nachman Kopald, 1898.

Along the street, near the Kupa Synagogue, there is also a section of the defensive wall, which was once part of the medieval fortifications of the town of Kazimierz, dating back to around 1340.

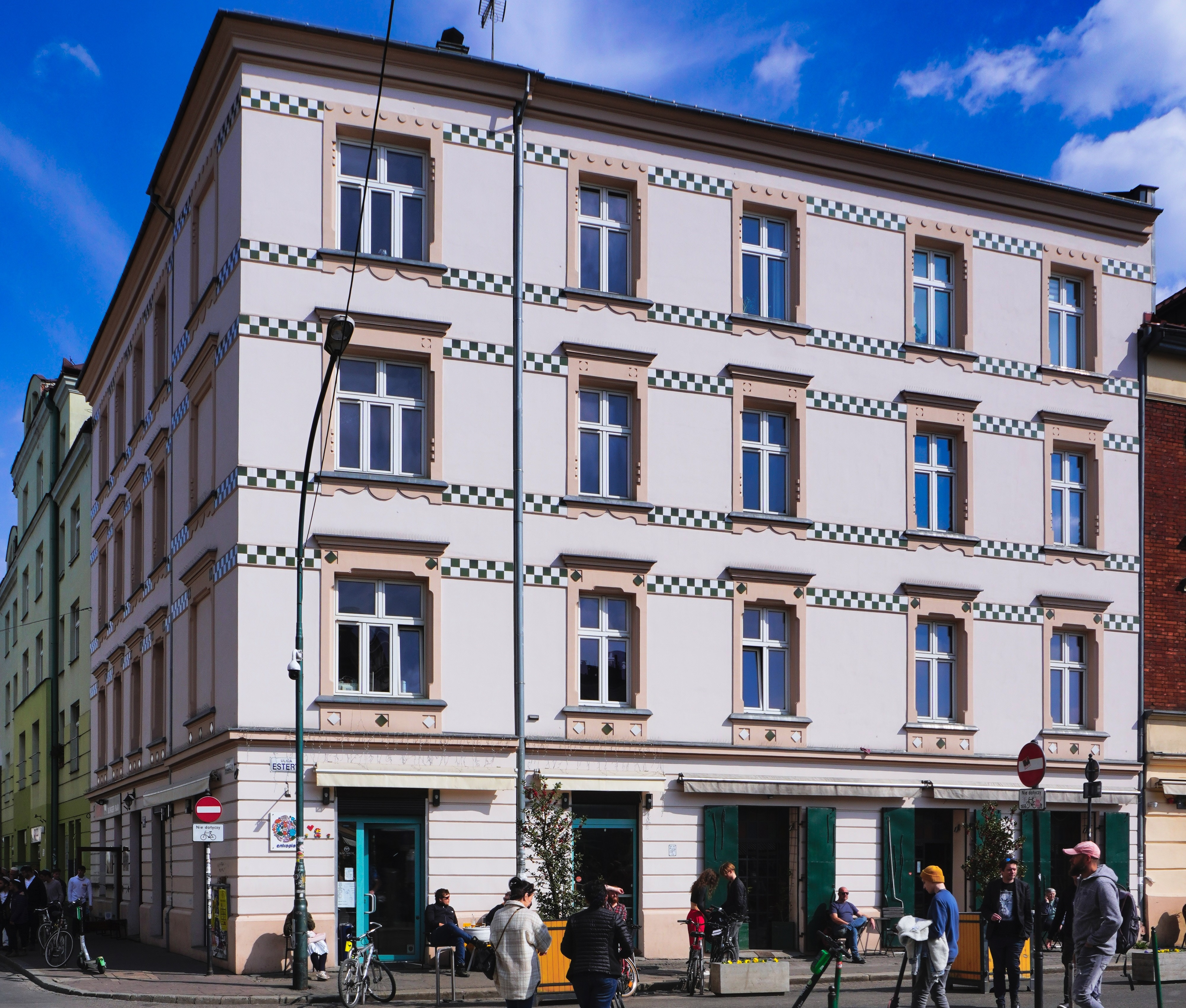
1 Warszauera Street
Tenement house (1910)

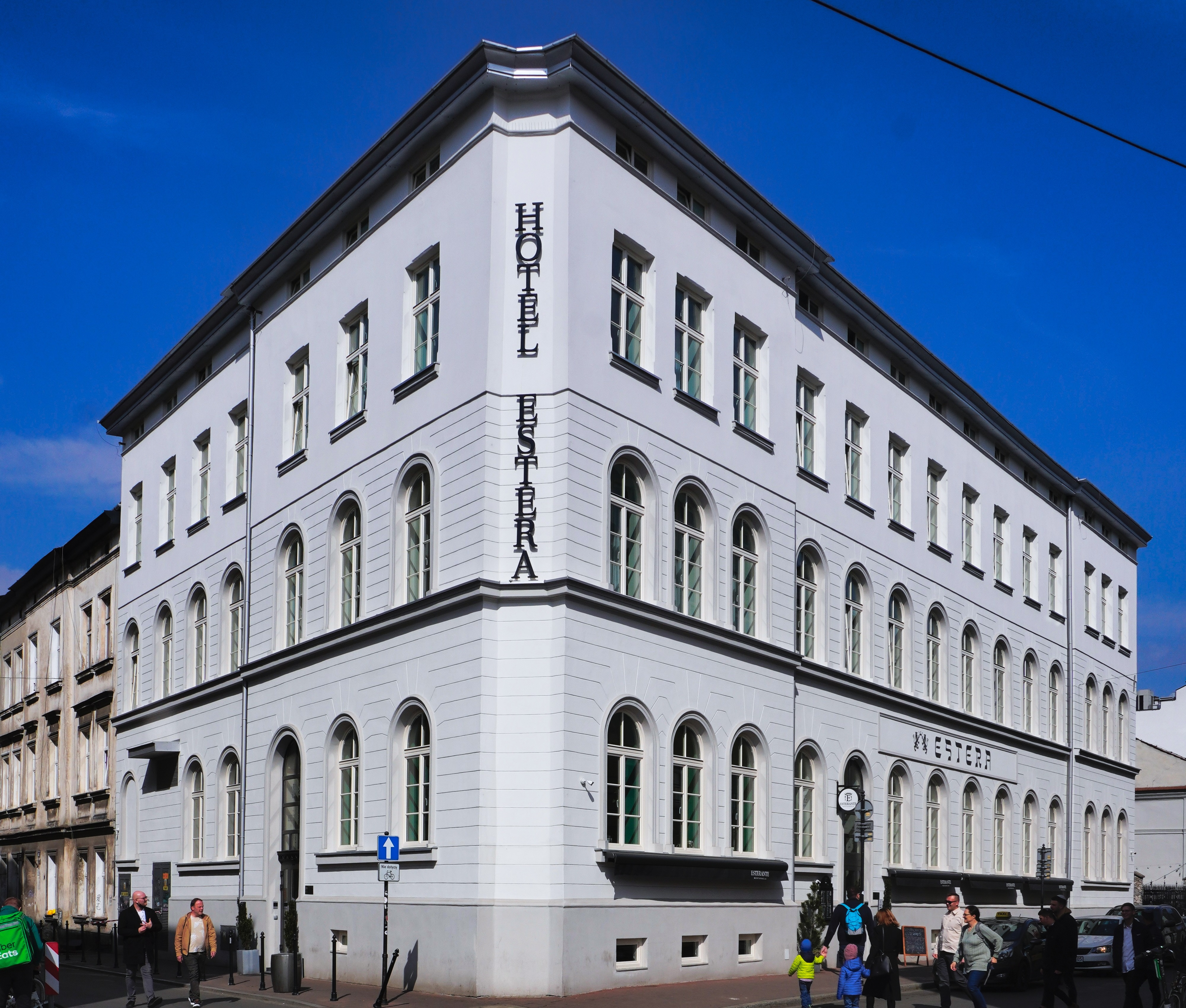
2 Warszauera Street
Tenement house, formerly Talmud Torah Synagogue, currently Hotel Estera (proj. Leopold Tlachna, 1909)

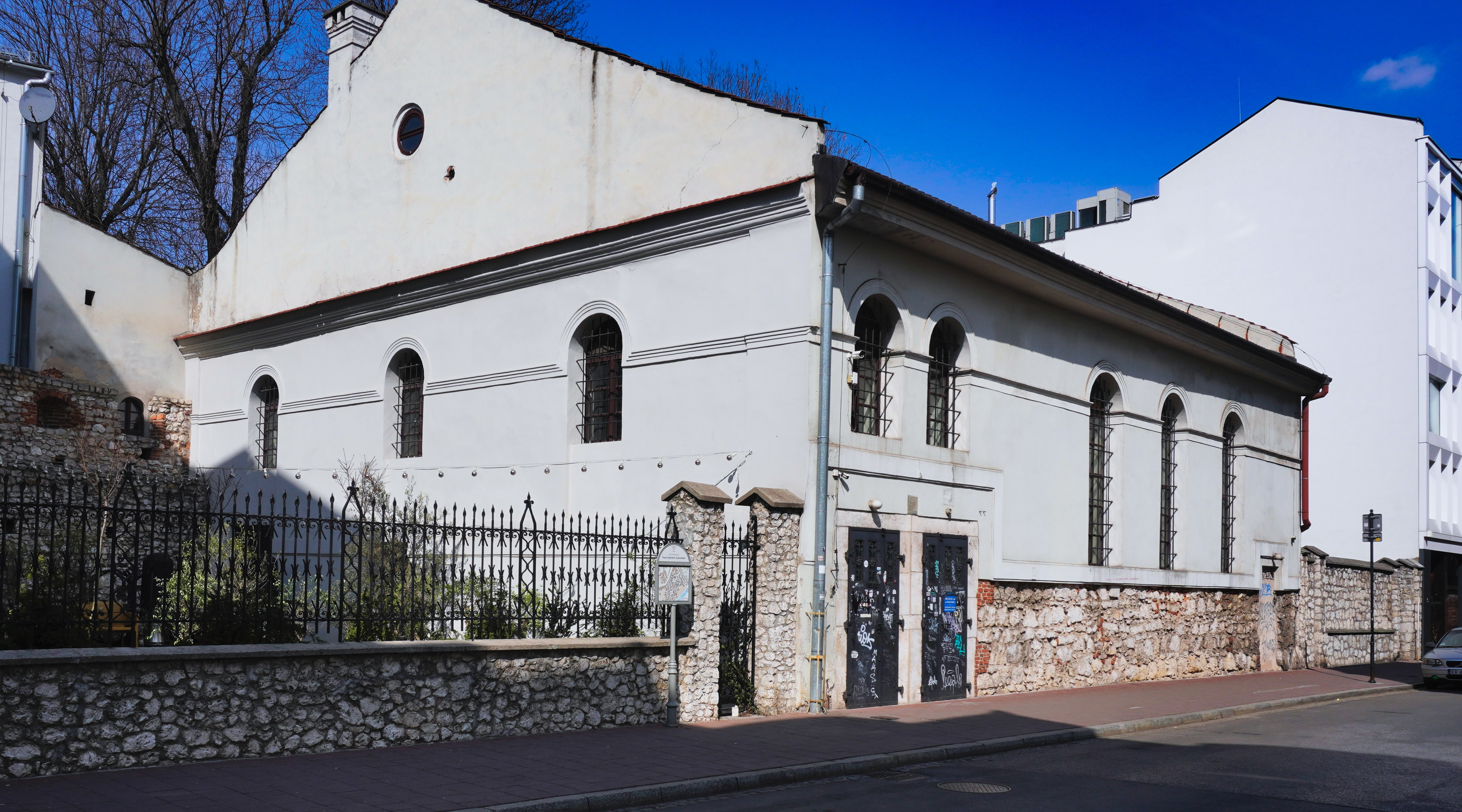
8 Warszauera Street
Kupa Synagogue
