= Kielce pogrom (1918) =

1918 pogrom in Poland

Coordinates: 50°52′16″N 20°37′44″E

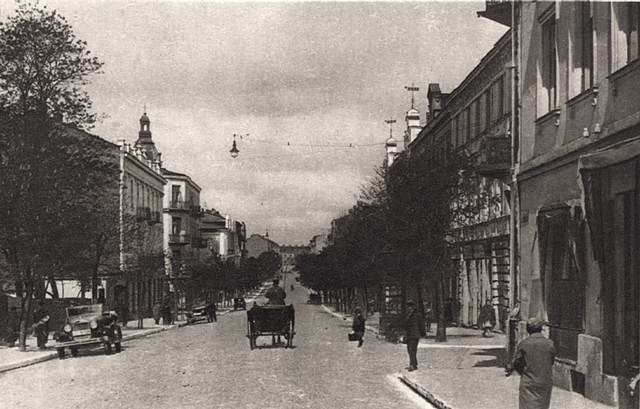
Kielce in the 1920s, Sienkiewicza Street where the Polish Theatre was located

The Kielce pogrom of 1918 refers to the events that occurred on 11 November 1918, in the Polish city of Kielce located in current Świętokrzyskie Voivodeship. According to 1919 Report by Henry Morgenthau, Sr. who led the Mission of The United States to Poland; during Poland's fight for independence towards the end of the First World War, shortly after the Austro-Hungarian troops were evacuated from Kielce by their military command, the city authorities allowed local Jewish community to hold a rally at the Polish Theatre. The participants rallied behind the Jewish demand for political and cultural autonomy. According to one U.S. source, during the rally, anti-Polish speeches were also being delivered. A respected lawyer, Mr. Frajzyngier, who attempted to deliver a public address in Polish was booed. The angry audience shouted: "No Polish language here!" According to Stanisław Białek from the Jan Karski Society, the voices of protest sparked a rumour about the anti-Polish character of the meeting. As the meeting went on, a crowd of Polish onlookers gathered outside the theatre.

At 6:30 P.M. the meeting began to break up, wrote Morgenthau. Only about 300 people remained in the auditorium. Soon, a group of soldiers entered the theatre and began to search for arms, driving the Jews towards the stairs, where a double line of extremists, some armed with clubs and bayonets beat the Jews as they were leaving the building according to Morgenthau. Outside the theatre, Jews were assaulted by the mob again. Jewish homes and shops were damaged. During the pogrom, four Jews were killed and a large number wounded, wrote Morgenthau. "A number of civilians have been indicted for participation in this excess", but had not been brought to trial by the time his report was delivered.

== See also ==
- Kielce pogrom
- Pinsk massacre
