= Pierre-de-Bresse =

- Commune
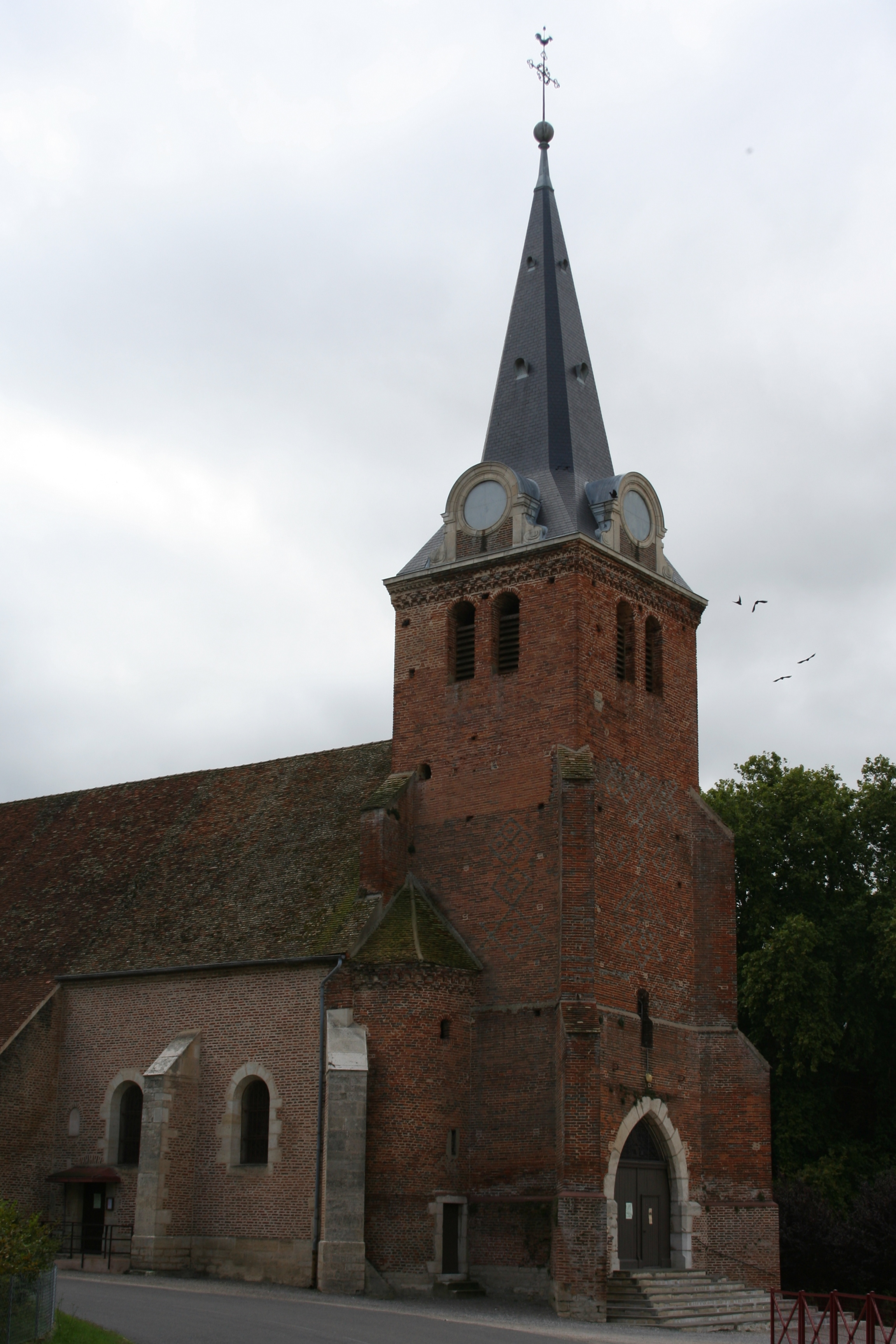
- The church in Pierre-de-Bresse

- Coat of arms
- Location of Pierre-de-Bresse
- Location within France Location within Bourgogne-Franche-Comté
- Coordinates: 46°53′05″N 5°15′47″E
- Country: France
- Region: Bourgogne-Franche-Comté
- Department: Saône-et-Loire
- Arrondissement: Louhans
- Canton: Pierre-de-Bresse

Government
  - Mayor (2020–2026): Aline Gruet
- Area^{1}: 28.06 km^{2} (10.83 sq mi)
- Elevation: 202 m (663 ft)
- Highest elevation: 214 m (702 ft)
- Lowest elevation: 177 m (581 ft)
- Population (2023): 1,967
  - Density: 70.10/km^{2} (181.6/sq mi)
- Time zone: UTC+01:00 (CET)
  - Summer (DST): UTC+02:00 (CEST)
- INSEE/Postal code: 71351 /71270
- ^{1} French Land Register data, which excludes lakes, ponds, glaciers > 1 km^{2} (0.386 sq mi or 247 acres) and river estuaries.

Pierre-de-Bresse (French pronunciation: [pjɛʁ də bʁɛs], before 1962: Pierre) is a commune in the Saône-et-Loire department in the region of Bourgogne-Franche-Comté in eastern France. It is known locally for its chateau.

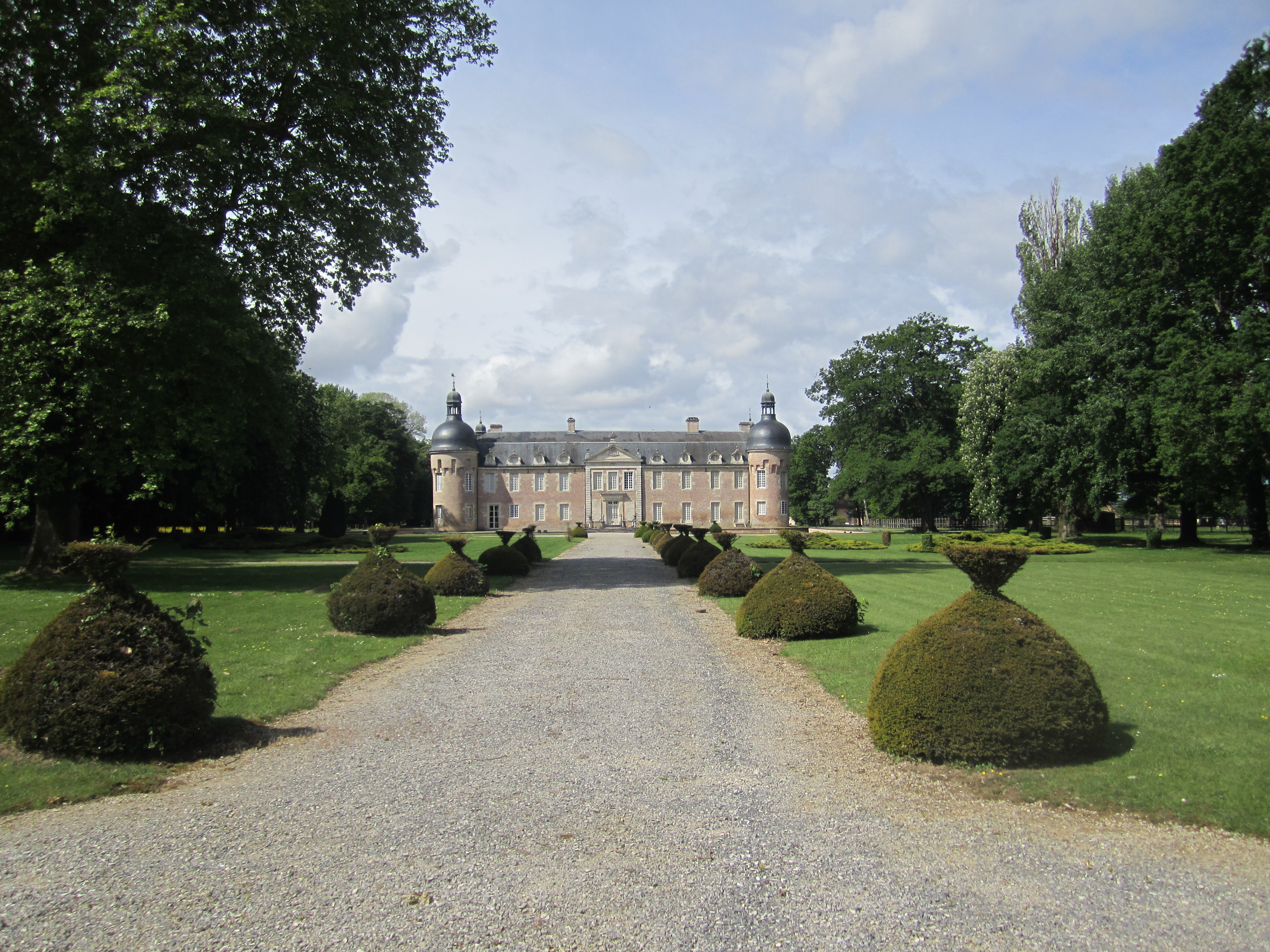
Chateau

== See also ==
- Communes of the Saône-et-Loire department
