= Julian Kwiek =

Polish scientist and historian

Julian Kwiek is Polish scientist and historian, who graduated from the University of Adam Mickiewicz in Poznań. In 1989 he received his Ph.D. in history at the Jagiellonian University in Kraków.

Kwiek is an Adjunct at the Faculty of Applied Social Sciences of the AGH University of Science and Technology. The scope of his professional interests include modern Poland with special focus on legal status of Polish minorities after 1945, the workings of the Polish underground organizations after World War II and the Polish political crises of communism. He is the author of over a dozen scientific papers, and books of Polish postwar history. Kwiek was an Elected Referee and Examiner for Doctor of Humanities Degrees at Jagiellonian University Faculty of Philosophy and History in 1988.

Kwiek works with the Team for Political Science and History, involved with the socio-political changes in Poland in the last century, the theory of politics, and the implications of the process of globalization. The main research directions of the Team encompass following fields:

Recent history

History of Polish political movements and organizations in the 20th century
Ethnic issues
Polish political émigrés

Political science

Theory of politics
Mechanisms of political systems
International relations
Issues of international security

Since 1996, the Team have been offering subjects connected with the issues of European integration and international security as part of the Jean Monnet programme. Since 2004, in cooperation with the Foundation for Local and Civil Initiatives the Team have been running the two-term Postgraduate Academy of European Funds Management.

== Research fields and interests ==
- Politics and the ethnic minorities after 1945
- Political crises in Poland after 1945

== Selected books and papers by Julian Kwiek ==
- Żydzi, Łemkowie, Słowacy w województwie krakowskim w latach 1945-1949/50, ISBN 978-83-7188-200-5, ISBN 83-7188-200-9, publisher: Księgarnia Akademicka, date: 1998-01-01, pages: 233, binding: book, language: Polish
- Związek Harcerstwa Polskiego w latach 1944-1950: Powstanie, rozwój, likwidacja by Julian Kwiek (University Press, 1995)
- Ludność słowacka w Polsce w latach 1956–1968 : polityka państwa i stosunki polsko-słowackie na Spiszu i Orawie (The population of Slovakia in Poland between 1956 and 1968 : the policy of state and the Polish-Slovak relations on Spis and Orava) in: Góry i góralszczyzna w dziejach i kulturze pogranicza polsko-słowackiego (Podhale, Spisz, Orawa, Gorce, Pieniny): materiały z międzynarodowej konferencji naukowej: Kraków – Nowy Targ – Bukowina Tatrzańska 21-24 października 2004: praca zbiorowa pod red. Jerzego M. Roszkowskiego i Roberta Kowalskiego; Podhalańska Państwowa Wyższa Szkoła Zawodowa w Nowym Targu. – Nowy Targ: PPWSZ; TPPK Towarzystwo Przyjaciół Polonistyki Krakowskiej, 2005. – S. 113–126
- Marzec 1968 w Krakowie w dokumentach (March 1968 in Cracow in documents), editor; introduction: Tomasz Gąsowski. (Kraków: Fundacja Centrum Dokumentacji Czynu Niepodległościowego Księgarnia Akademicka, 2005. – 433, [2] s. – (Biblioteka Centrum Dokumentacji Czynu Niepodległościowego; t. 30)
- Pogranicze polsko-słowackie na Spiszu i Orawie po drugiej wojnie światowej (The Polish-Slovak borderland on Spis and Orava after the Second World War) in: Polityka i mniejszości narodowe na pograniczach, editors: Marzenna Giedrojć, Małgorzata Mieczkowska, Janusz Mieczkowski; Uniwersytet Szczeciński. – Szczecin : [s. n.], 2005. – (Rozprawy i Studia / Uniwersytet Szczeciński; vol. 567). – pg. 189–200
- Położenie mniejszości narodowych w Polsce po 1989 r. w kontekście standardów europejskich (The position of national minorities in Poland after 1989 in the context of European standards) in: Wokół problematyki integracji europejskiej, editor: Stefan BIELAŃSKI i Tadeusz BIERNAT. – Toruń : Wydawnictwo Adam Marszałek, 1999. – pg. 89–106. – Abstr.
- Przebieg wyborów do sejmu w styczniu 1957 roku w województwie krakowskim (The general election of 20 January 1957 in the Cracow Voivodship) Studia Historyczne. – 2000, pg. 105–124. – Summ.
- Rok 1956 w Krakowie i w województwie: wybrane problemy (The year 1956 in Cracow and province: selected problems). – Kraków: Instytut Nauk Społecznych AGH, 1999. – 163 s. – Bibliogr. s. 156–158, Indeks
- Wstęp (Introduction): Marzec 1968 w Krakowie w dokumentach / wstęp i oprac. Julian Kwiek, wprow. Tomasz Gąsowski. – Kraków : Fundacja Centrum Dokumentacji Czynu Niepodległościowego Księgarnia Akademicka, 2005. – (Biblioteka Centrum Dokumentacji Czynu Niepodległościowego; vol. 30). – pg. 9–12
- Wybory do rad narodowych w województwie krakowskim w 1958 roku (Local elections in the Cracow voivodship in 1958) Studia Historyczne. – 2004, pg. 61–84. – Abstract.
- Wydarzenia antyżydowskie 11 sierpnia 1945 r. w Krakowie : dokumenty — (Anti-Jewish events of the 11th of August in Cracow: documents) Biuletyn Żydowskiego Instytutu Historycznego. – 2000 nr 1 pg. 77–89
- Z dziejów ludności żydowskiej w Tarnowie w pierwszych latach po II wojnie światowej (From history of the Jewish people in Tarnów in the first years after the II world war) Rocznik Tarnowski. – 1999/2000 pg. 93–101. – Bibliogr. s. 100–101
- Marzec 1968 w Krakowie w dokumentach (March 1968 in Documents). Publisher: Księgarnia Akademicka Co, 2005, ISBN 83-7188-901-1

== See also ==
- History of Poland (1945–1989)
- Chronology of Jewish Polish history
- Kraków pogrom
- World War II atrocities in Poland
