= Pierreclos =

- Commune
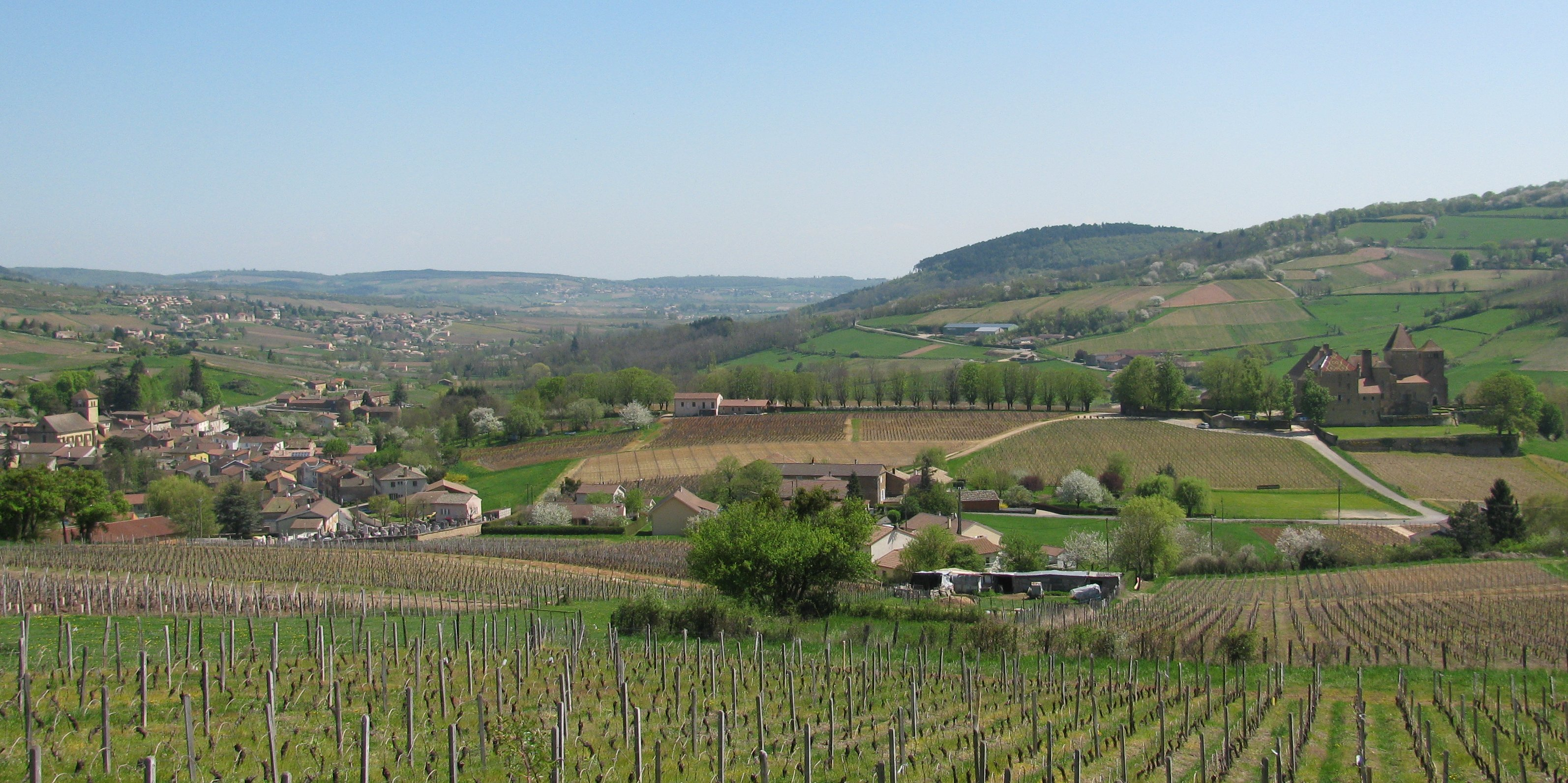
- A general view of Pierreclos
- Location of Pierreclos
- Location within France Location within Bourgogne-Franche-Comté
- Coordinates: 46°20′04″N 4°41′18″E
- Country: France
- Region: Bourgogne-Franche-Comté
- Department: Saône-et-Loire
- Arrondissement: Mâcon
- Canton: La Chapelle-de-Guinchay
- Area^{1}: 12.41 km^{2} (4.79 sq mi)
- Elevation: 289 m (948 ft)
- Highest elevation: 746 m (2,448 ft)
- Lowest elevation: 245 m (804 ft)
- Population (2023): 846
  - Density: 68.2/km^{2} (177/sq mi)
- Time zone: UTC+01:00 (CET)
  - Summer (DST): UTC+02:00 (CEST)
- INSEE/Postal code: 71350 /71960
- ^{1} French Land Register data, which excludes lakes, ponds, glaciers > 1 km^{2} (0.386 sq mi or 247 acres) and river estuaries.

Pierreclos (French pronunciation: [pjɛʁklo]) is a commune in the Saône-et-Loire department in the region of Bourgogne-Franche-Comté in eastern France.

== Geography ==
Situated 14 kilometers west of Mâcon and 14 kilometers south of Cluny, Pierreclos is a small vineyard village in the Tramayes county.

== History ==
The name Pierreclos come from "Petra Clausa" meaning Closed stone, or tomb, in Latin. It was a necropolis for important people of the Roman Province.

Before the French Revolution, the history of the village was closely linked to its castle.

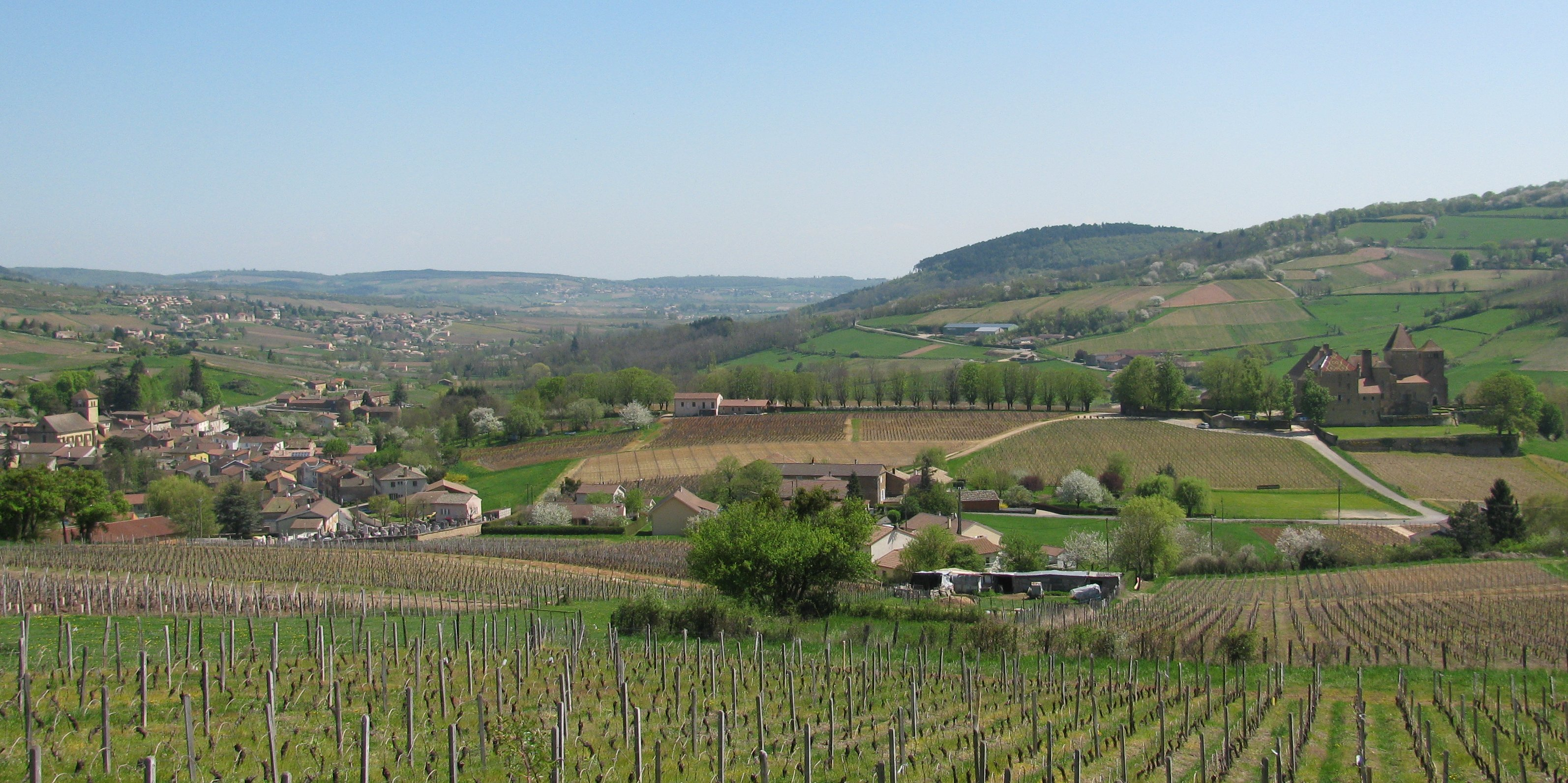
Le village et le château.

== Demography ==
In 2016, the population of the village was 910 inhabitants.

== Economy ==
Pierreclos is surrounded by vineyards which are used for great quality wines. The main employer is a low-cost salted meat producer.

== Important People ==
Alphonse De Lamartine had a child with Jacqueline de Pierreclos (Laurence in Jocelyn)

== See also ==
- Ruère
- Communes of the Saône-et-Loire department
