= Kupa Synagogue =

Former synagogue in Kraków, Poland

- Synagoga Kupa
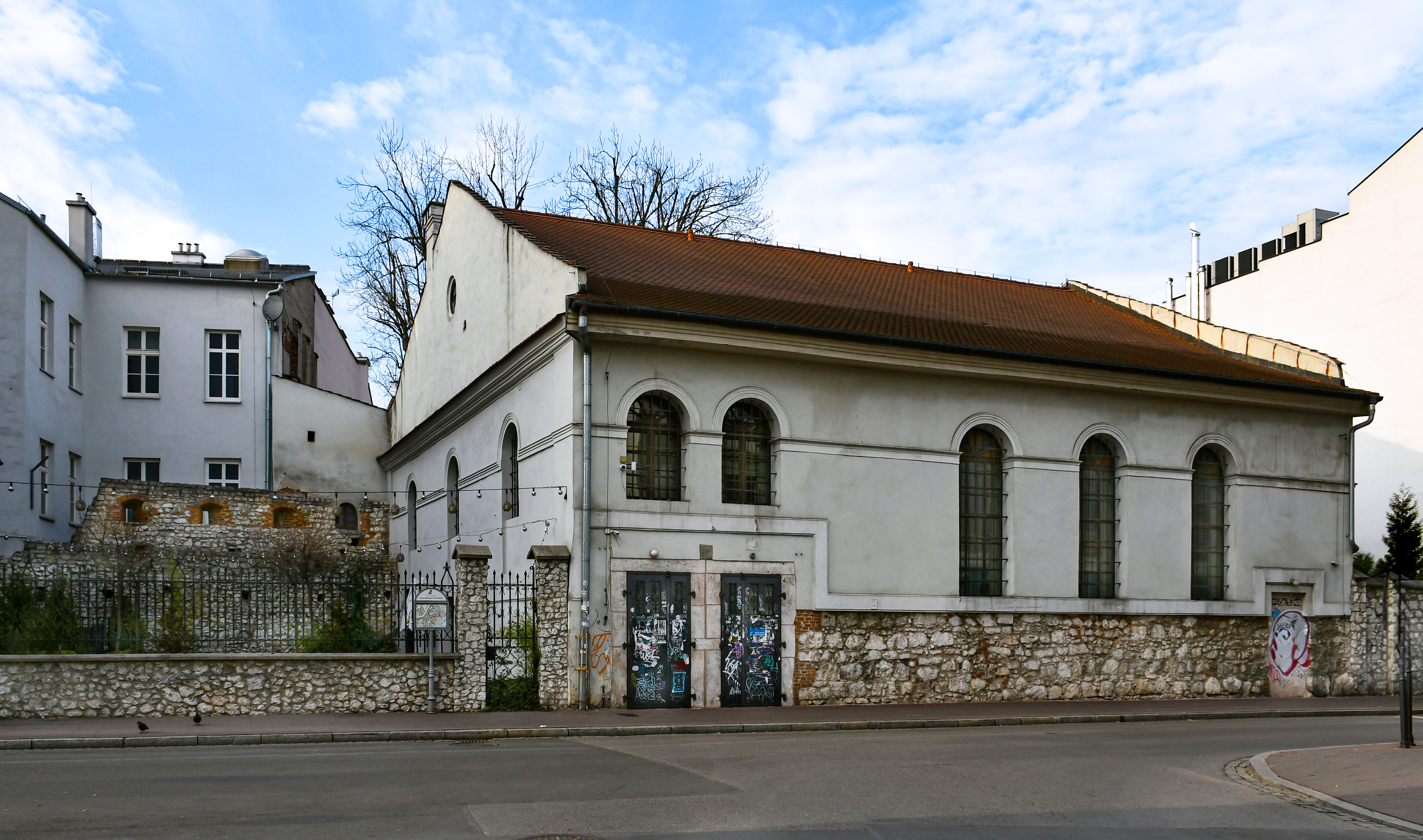
- View from Kupa Street (from S)

- Location of the synagogue in Lesser Poland Voivodeship

Religion
- Affiliation: Judaism
- Rite: Nusach Ashkenaz
- Ecclesiastical or organisational status: Synagogue (1643–1945); Profane use (1959–1991); Jewish museum (since 1996)
- Status: Abandoned; Repurposed

Location
- Location: 27 Miodowa Street (entrance); 8 Warszauera Street, Kazimierz, Kraków, Lesser Poland Voivodeship
- Country: Poland
- Coordinates: 50°03′09.5″N 19°56′44.5″E

Architecture
- Type: Synagogue architecture
- Style: Baroque; Moorish Revival
- Completed: 1643
- Materials: Brick

UNESCO World Heritage Site
- Type: Cultural
- Criteria: iv
- Designated: 1978
- Part of: Historic Centre of Kraków
- Reference no.: 29
- Region: Europe and North America

Historic Monument of Poland
- Designated: 1994-09-08
- Part of: Kraków historical city complex
- Reference no.: M.P. 1994 nr 50 poz. 418

The Kupa Synagogue (Polish: Synagoga Kupa), also known as the Synagogue of the Poor (Polish: Synagoga Ubogich), is a former Jewish congregation and synagogue, that is located at 8 Warszauera Street, in the historic Kazimierz district of Kraków, in the Lesser Poland Voivodeship of Poland. The 17th-century former synagogue is located in a neighborhood earmarked in 1495 by King John I Albert for the Jewish community, that was transferred from the budding Old Town.

Devastated by Nazis during World War II, the former synagogue was used for profane purposes until 1991; and has subsequently operated as a Jewish museum since 1996. The building served Kraków's Jewish community as one of the venues for religious ceremonies and cultural festivals, notably the annual Jewish Culture Festival in Kraków.

== History ==
The former synagogue was founded in 1643 by the Kazimierz Jewish district's kehilla, as a foundation of the local qahal. A contribution of 200 zlotys by the Jewish goldsmiths' guild helped to bring the construction to its successful completion. The synagogue was built in a Baroque style with a square prayer hall inside.

Many renovations occurred throughout the centuries. In 1830-1834 the two-storey annex was added with entrance hall and washrooms. In 1861 the western wing was built. At the end of the 19th century, the former synagogue was joined with the adjacent building. The former synagogue was burned down by a Polish mob during the Kraków pogrom, shortly after the end of World War II, and was subsequently meticulously restored. The northern wall of the former synagogue connected with the remnants of the medieval city-wall of Kazimerz, while its southern flank faced Warchauera Street. The colorful interior of the former synagogue served as an exhibition hall and the venue for musical events.

The former synagogue was richly decorated with paintings from the 1920s featured on walls, the ceiling and in the women's section. The depictions included the holy places of Hebron, Tiberias, and Jerusalem. There were also Biblical scenes and illustrations to verses in Psalms, such as the painting showing people standing by the rivers of Babylon (Psalms 137:1–3), or musical instruments (Psalms 150:3–6). Another painting depicted Noah's Ark including the figure of Noah – quite unusual since the use of human images was very rare in Jewish art. The signs of the Zodiac are painted over the women's gallery. The artist is unidentified. There are also remnants of earlier paintings from the 17th to 18th centuries. The older drawings are ornamental, with leaves and fruit surrounding texts. A carved wood and stucco Torah Ark, from the early 17th century, adorned the interior.

The Kupa Synagogue was entered into the register of historical monuments under the number A-700 on July 30, 1986.

== Gallery ==
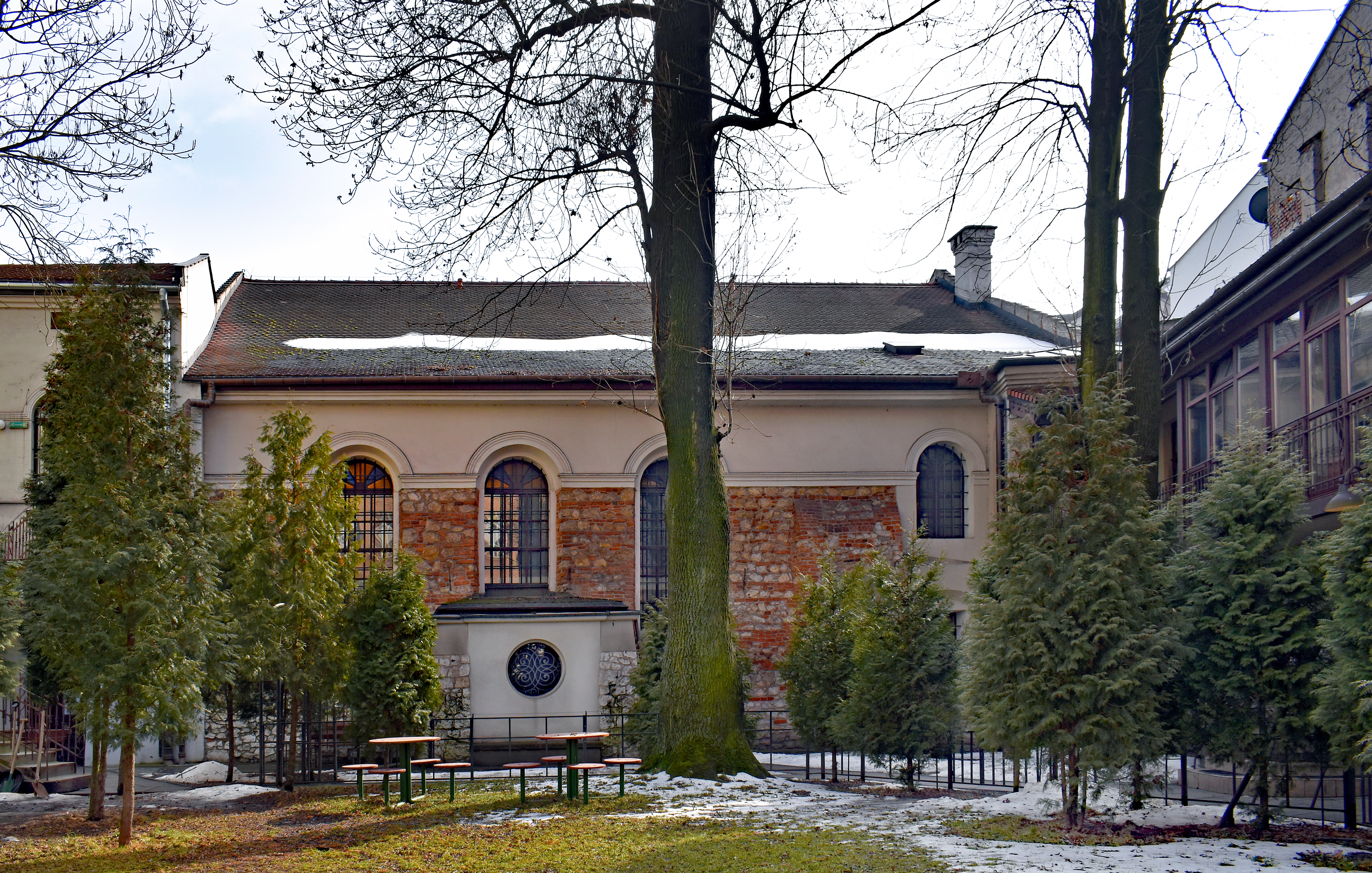
View from Miodowa Street, entrance to synagogue

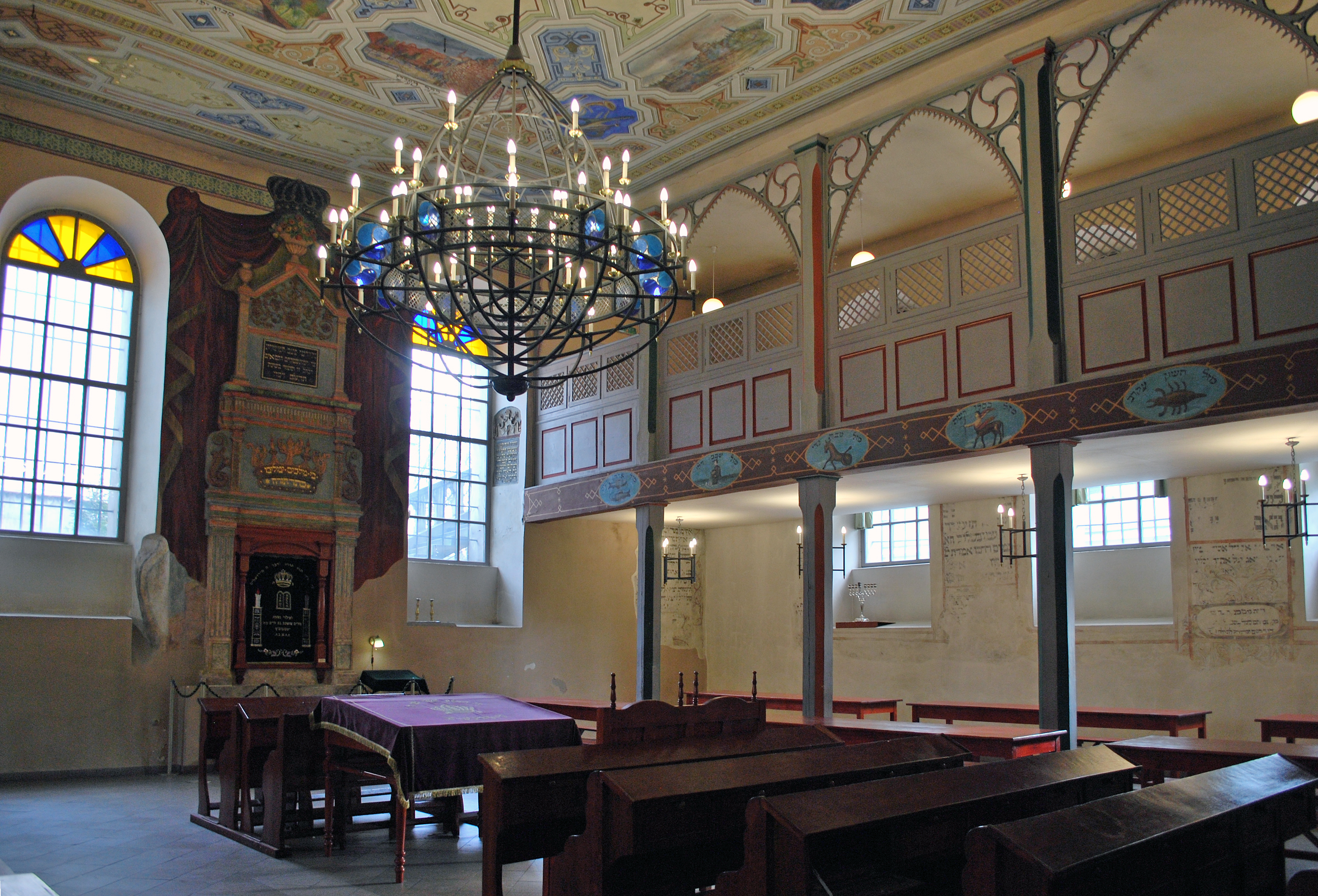
The synagogue interior and Torah ark (Aron ha-Kodesh)

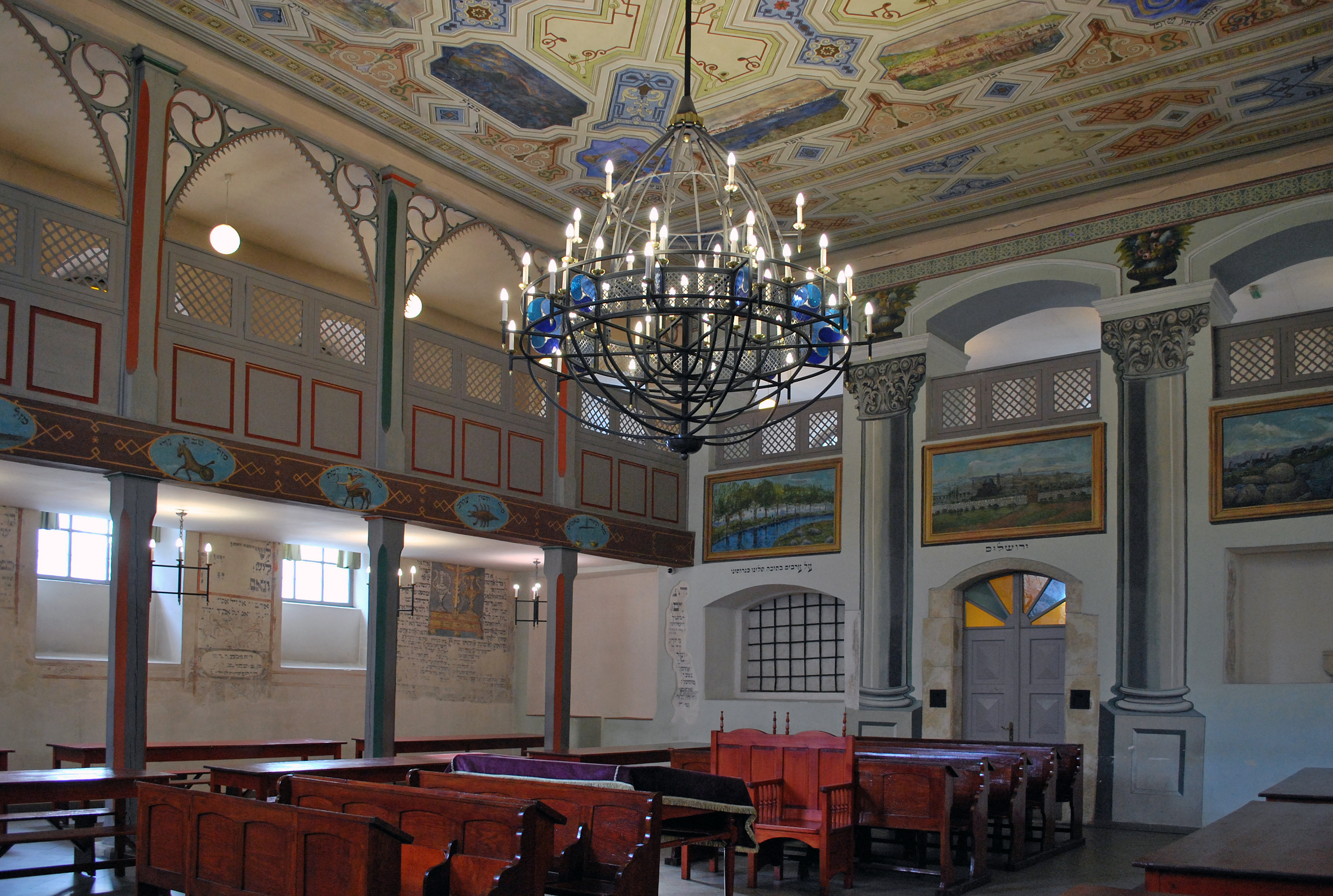
A view of the synagogue gallery

== See also ==
- Chronology of Jewish Polish history
- Culture of Kraków
- History of the Jews in Poland
- List of active synagogues in Poland
- Synagogues of Kraków
