= Romanèche-Thorins =

- Commune
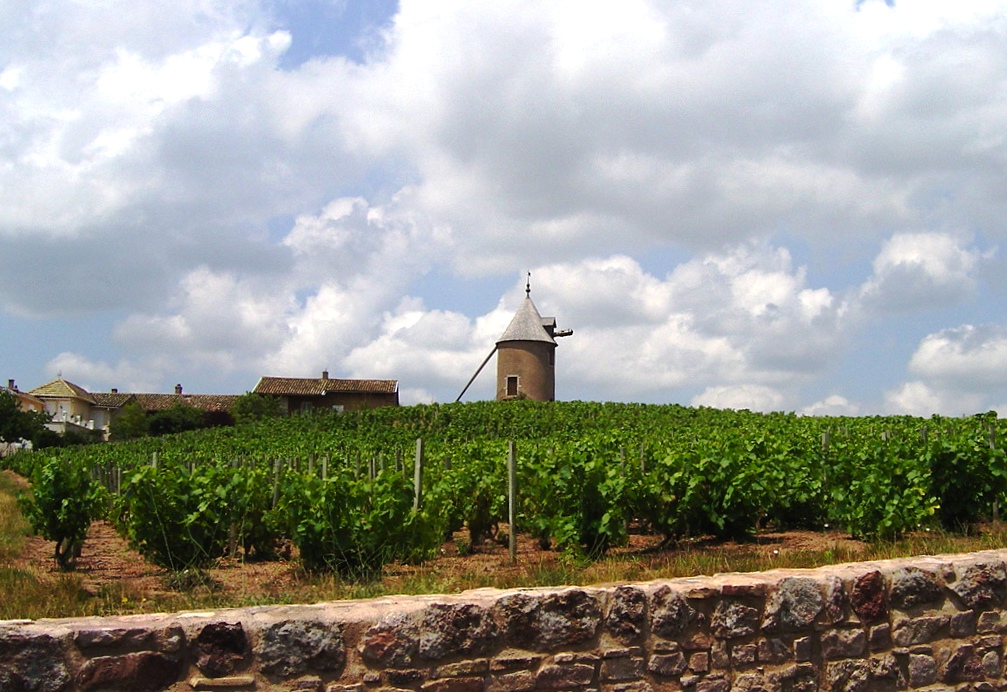
- Vineyards and windmill
- Location of Romanèche-Thorins
- Location within France Location within Bourgogne-Franche-Comté
- Coordinates: 46°11′26″N 4°44′13″E
- Country: France
- Region: Bourgogne-Franche-Comté
- Department: Saône-et-Loire
- Arrondissement: Mâcon
- Canton: La Chapelle-de-Guinchay
- Intercommunality: Mâconnais Beaujolais Agglomération
- Area^{1}: 9.76 km^{2} (3.77 sq mi)
- Elevation: 187 m (614 ft)
- Highest elevation: 262 m (860 ft)
- Lowest elevation: 168 m (551 ft)
- Population (2023): 2,005
  - Density: 205/km^{2} (532/sq mi)
- Time zone: UTC+01:00 (CET)
  - Summer (DST): UTC+02:00 (CEST)
- INSEE/Postal code: 71372 /71570
- ^{1} French Land Register data, which excludes lakes, ponds, glaciers > 1 km^{2} (0.386 sq mi or 247 acres) and river estuaries.

Romanèche-Thorins (French pronunciation: [ʁɔmanɛʃ tɔʁɛ̃]) is a commune in the Saône-et-Loire department in the region of Bourgogne-Franche-Comté in eastern France.

== Population ==
Historical population
Year	Pop.	±% p.a.
1968	1,915	—
1975	1,801	−0.87%
1982	1,699	−0.83%
1990	1,710	+0.08%
1999	1,717	+0.05%
2007	1,780	+0.45%
2012	1,929	+1.62%
2017	2,006	+0.79%
2023	2,005	−0.01%
Source: INSEE

== See also ==
- Communes of the Saône-et-Loire department
