= Kraków pogrom =

1945 antisemitic riot in Soviet-occupied Poland

Coordinates: 50°03′06″N 19°56′41″E

- Part of anti-Jewish violence in Poland, 1944–1946
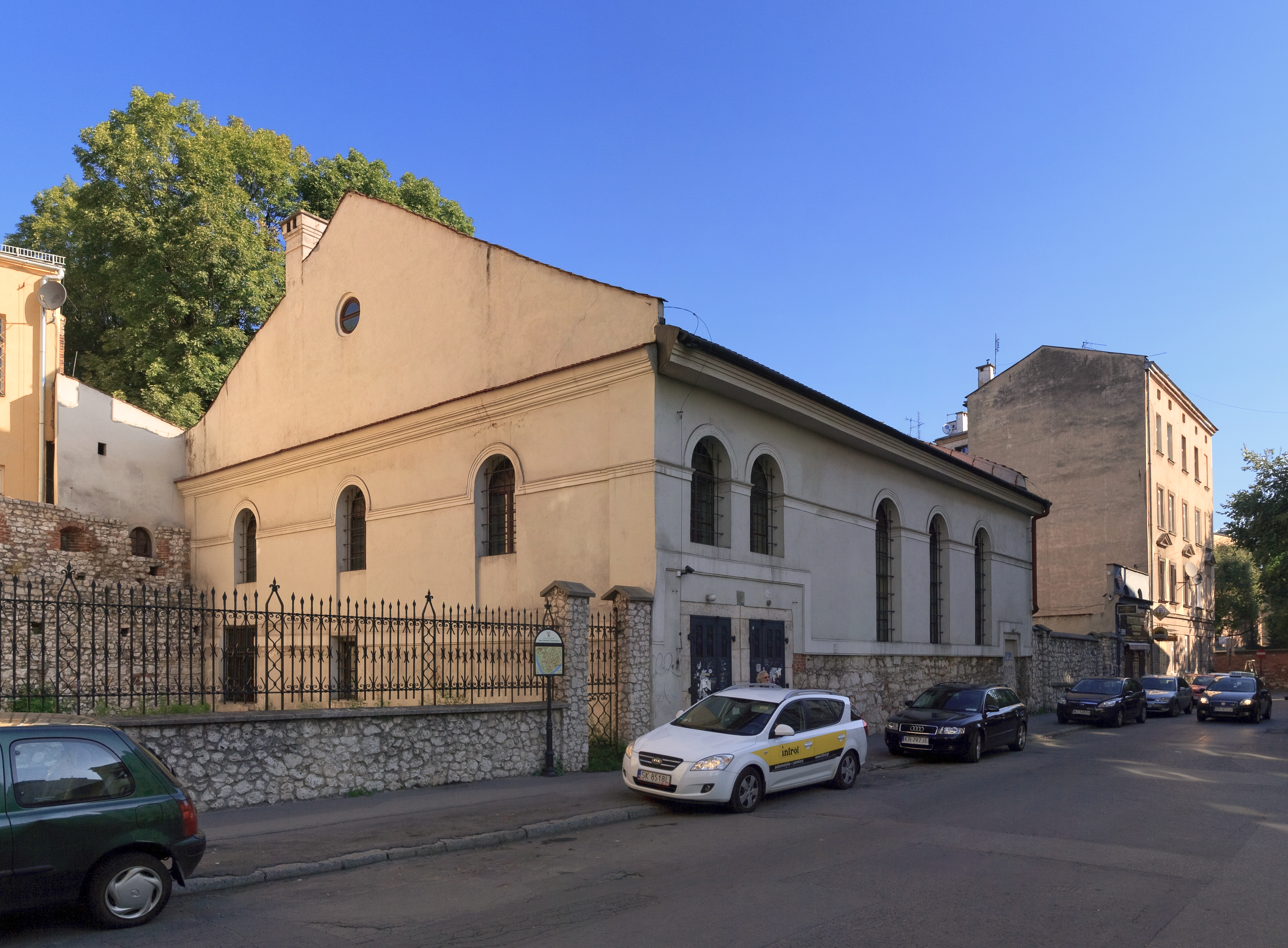
- Kupa Synagogue in the Kazimierz district of Kraków, 2014
- Location: Kraków, Poland
- Date: 11 August 1945
- Target: Polish Jews
- Deaths: At least 1 woman, Róża Berger, a 56-year-old Auschwitz survivor
- Injuries: Unknown
- Perpetrators: Civilians, security officers
- Motive: Blood libel

The Kraków pogrom was the first anti-Jewish riot in post World War II Poland, that took place on 11 August 1945 in the city of Kraków, Poland. The incident was part of anti-Jewish violence in Poland towards and after the end of World War II. The immediate cause of the pogrom was a blood libel rumour of a ritual murder of Polish children by Jews in the city. A false allegation that a child had been abducted by a Jewish woman had grown to allegations that Jews had killed up to 80 children over the course of weeks. These allegations led to attacks on Jews, as well as some Poles mistaken for Jews, in the Kazimierz quarter, and other parts of the Old Town, and the burning of the Kupa Synagogue. At least one person was killed and an unknown number were injured.

== Background ==
Before the German invasion of Poland in September 1939, around 68,000 to 80,000 Jews lived in Kraków. In January 1945, there were only 2,000 Jewish Holocaust survivors in the city who had not fled following the arrival of the Soviet Red Army. Some Jewish refugees returned to Kraków from the Soviet Union and from neighbouring villages and towns. By May 1945, there were 6,637 Jews in the city.

The return of these Jews was not always welcomed, especially by the antisemitic elements in the populace. Anti-Jewish violence in Kraków was a serious problem according to the Soviet-installed starosta in the city, even though "no serious antisemitic events were recorded in the rural and small-town regions." In June 1945, the new communist voivode of Kraków described in his report alleged growing tensions to his superiors. In his report for 1–10 August, the Kraków city administrator (starosta grodzki) noted the "insufficient supply of food."

== Unrest ==
On 27 June 1945, a Jewish woman was brought to a local Milicja Obywatelska police station and falsely accused of attempting to abduct a child. Despite the fact that the investigation revealed that the child's mother had left the child in the care of the suspect, rumours started to spread that a Jewish woman abducted the child in order to kill him. A mob shouting anti-Jewish slogans gathered at Kleparski Square, but a Milicja detachment brought the situation under control. Blood libel rumours continued to spread. False claims that thirteen corpses of Christian children had been discovered were disseminated. By 11 August, the number of rumoured "victims" had grown to eighty. Groups of hooligans who gathered at Kleparski Square had been throwing stones at the Kupa Synagogue on a weekly basis. On 11 August, an attempt to seize a thirteen-year-old boy who was throwing stones at the synagogue was made, but he escaped and rushed to the nearby marketplace screaming "Help me, the Jews have tried to kill me."

Instantly the crowd broke into the Kupa Synagogue and started beating Jews, who had been praying at the Saturday morning Shabbat service, and the Torah scrolls were burned. The Jewish hostel was also attacked. Jewish men, women, and children were beaten up on the streets; their homes were broken into and robbed. Some Jews wounded during the pogrom were hospitalized and later were beaten in the hospitals again. One of the pogrom victims witnessed:

I was carried to the second precinct of the militia where they called for an ambulance. There were five more people over there, including badly wounded Polish woman. In the ambulance I heard the comments of the escorting soldier and the nurse who spoke about us as Jewish crust whom they have to save, and that they shouldn't be doing this because we murdered children, that all of us should be shot. We were taken to the hospital of St. Lazarus at Kopernika Street. I was first taken to the operating room. After the operation a soldier appeared who said that he will take everybody to jail after the operation. He beat up one of the wounded Jews waiting for an operation. He held us under cocked gun and did not allow us to take a drink of water. A moment later two railroadmen appeared and one said, "It's a scandal that a Pole does not have the civil courage to hit a defenceless person", and he hit a wounded Jew. One of the hospital inmates hit me with a crutch. Women, including nurses, stood behind the doors threatening us that they were only waiting for the operation to be over in order to rip us apart.

During the pogrom some Poles, mistaken for Jews, were also attacked. The centre of these events was Miodowa, Starowiślna, Przemyska, and Józefa Streets in the Kazimierz quarter. The riots were most intense between 11 am and 1 pm, calming down around 2 pm, only to regain strength in the late afternoon when the Kupa Synagogue was set on fire.

Polish policemen and soldiers actively participated in these events. In total, 145 suspects were arrested including 40 militiamen and 6 soldiers of the Wojsko Polskie (Polish Army). In September and October 1945, 25 people were charged with inciting racial hatred, robberies, and violence against Jews. Twelve of those charged were officers. Ten of the accused were sentenced to prison. According to the report prepared for Joseph Stalin by the NKVD in Kraków, Polish militiamen had sanctioned the violence.

== Casualties ==
There is one official record of a death relating to Kraków events in the archives of the Forensic Medicine Department in Kraków. The victim was 56-year-old Auschwitz survivor Róża Berger, shot while standing behind closed doors.
