= Contest =

Contest may refer to:

- Competition
- Will contest, dispute over the final wishes of a testator
- Contesting, an amateur radio activity (a radiosport)

== Arts and media ==
=== Movies ===
- Contest (2013 film), an American comedy-drama film
- Contest (1932 film), German, about motor racing

=== Television ===
- "The Contest", a 1992 episode (S4 E11 / #51) of Seinfeld
- "The Contest" (Arthur), a 1999 episode (S4 E4a / #69a) of Arthur
- "The Contest", a 1996 episode (S7 E2 / #133) of Baywatch
- "The Contest", a 2012 episode (S2 E17 / #29) of Harry's Law
- "The Contest", a 2014 episode (S2 E3 / #14) of Alpha House
- "The Contest", a 1954 episode (S1 E16 / #16) and a 1959 episode (S6 E3 / #185) of Lassie
- The Con Test, a 2007 Australian game show
- "Contest" (Bottom), a 1991 episode (S1 E3 / #3) of Bottom

=== Literature ===
- Contest (novel), by Matthew Reilly, 1996
- The Contest (DC Comics), a 1994 story arc
- Portuguese: Contestável, lit. 'to Contest', a political magazine published in Lisbon in the 1970s

=== Other media ===
- "Contest" (song), performed by Travis Scott and SoFaygo, on 2025 album JackBoys 2

== Watercraft ==
- Contest, a ship sunk in CSS Alabama's Indian Ocean Expeditionary Raid in 1863
- Contest (1804 ship), an Australian ship sunk in 1807
- HMS Contest, the name of various ships of the British Royal Navy
- Contest Yachts, the creator of Contest 25 OC (1982), Contest 29 (1964), and Contest 32 CS (1978), classes of yachts

== Other uses ==
- Contest, Mayenne, a village and commune of the Mayenne département in France
- CONTEST, codename for the British government's counter-terrorism strategy
- Contest, a scenario in Australian rules football
- Saint Contest (AKA Contentius), 480–510 bishop of Bayeux

== See also ==
- , e.g.:
  - Contest Carnage, a 2008 book in the Astrosaurs Academy series
  - Contest competition in ecology
  - Contest for New Music (Finnish: Uuden Musiikin Kilpailu), an annual music contest that debuted in 2012
  - Contest mention, a kind of hearing in Australian law
  - Contest mobility, a system of social mobility
  - Contest of Champions (disambiguation)
  - "Contest of Chaos", a 2023 comic book crossover storyline
  - "Contest of Cithaeron and Helicon", a fragment of an ancient poem by Corinna
  - Contest of Homer and Hesiod, a 2nd century Greek narrative
  - Contest Searchlight, a 2002 mockumentary television series
  - The Contest Between Harmony and Invention (Italian: Il cimento dell'armonia e dell'inventione), a set of concertos by Antonio Vivaldi, published in 1725 as Op. 8
  - Hundred man killing contest, a 1937 sensationalized story in Japan
- , e.g.:
  - Contested convention in US politics
  - Contested garment rule, a method for resolving conflicting estate claims
  - Contested ideological terrain, a sociological framework
  - Contested Memories: Poles and Jews During the Holocaust and Its Aftermath, a 2003 book
  - Contested possession, a scenario in Australian rules football
  - Contested United States presidential elections
  - Contested case hearing, quasi-judicial administrative hearing governed by state law in the US
  - Essentially contested concept, a term with value judgements
- Contesting the Future of Nuclear Power: A Critical Global Assessment of Atomic Energy, a 2011 book by Benjamin K. Sovacool
- Contestant (disambiguation)
- , e.g.:
  - Contestable market, an economic theory
  - Contestado War, Brazil, 1912–1916
  - Contestani, an ethnonym of Roman Spain of the imperial period
  - Contestazione generale (the Italian title of Let's Have a Riot), a 1970 Italian comedy film
  - Contesti (disambiguation)
- Competition (disambiguation)
