= List of shipwrecks in November 1863 =

The list of shipwrecks in November 1863 includes ships sunk, foundered, wreckered, grounded, or otherwise lost during November 1863.

== 1 November ==
List of shipwrecks: 1 November 1863
Ship	State	Description
Alpha	United Kingdom	The schooner was abandoned in the Dogger Bank. Her seven crew were rescued by the fishing smack Superior (United Kingdom).
Anna Maria	Austrian Empire	The brig was wrecked on the Girdler Sand, in the North Sea off the coast of Kent. Her crew were rescued. She was on a voyage from Buenos Aires, Argentina to London, United Kingdom.
Annandale	United Kingdom	The brig foundered in the Bay of Biscay. Her crew were rescued by the brig Maria Young (United Kingdom). She was on a voyage from Cartagena, Spain to South Shields, County Durham or vice versa.
Ann Griffiths	United Kingdom	The ship was driven ashore on Amrum, Duchy of Holstein. She was on a voyage from Bremen to Rouen, Seine-Inférieure, France.
Annie	United Kingdom	The ship foundered in the Dogger Bank. Her five crew took to a boat; they were rescued by the fishing smack Signal (United Kingdom).
Auckland	United Kingdom	The brig was abandoned in the North Sea. Her crew were rescued by the sloop Ulrika (Denmark). Auckland was on a voyage from Sunderland, County Durham to Hamburg.
Aurora	(Russian Empire) Grand Duchy of Finland	The ship was wrecked at "Valska" with the loss of all but one of her crew. She was on a voyage from "Kyloyn" to Sunderland.
Bandon	United Kingdom	The ship was driven ashore and wrecked at Breaksea Point, Glamorgan. She was on a voyage from Kinsale, County Cork to Bristol, Gloucestershire.
Catharina	Prussia	The ship was lost near Gothenburg, Sweden. She was on a voyage from Memel to London.
David Legg	United Kingdom	The ship foundered in the North Sea off the mouth of the Humber. Her crew were rescued. She was on a voyage from Sunderland, County Durham to Littlehampton, Sussex.
Earl of Montague	United Kingdom	The ship sprang a leak and foundered. Her crew were rescued by Ida (United Kingdom). Earl Montague was on a voyage from Sunderland to Havana, Cuba.
Heinrich	Stralsund	The ship sank in the North Sea. Her seven crew were rescued by the sloop Marie (Hamburg). Heinrich was on a voyage from Burntisland, Fife, United Kingdom to Altona.
Helena	United Kingdom	The ship collided with the brig Arrow (United Kingdom) and sank in the North Sea off Great Yarmouth, Norfolk with the loss of four of her six crew. Survivors were rescued by Arrow. Helena was on a voyage from
Hoffnung	Russia	The ship was driven ashore and wrecked north of Fredrikshavn, Denmark. She was on a voyage from Dunkirk, Nord to Riga.
Horizon	United Kingdom	The ship ran aground in Liverpool Bay. She was on a voyage from Liverpool, Lancashire to Calcutta, India. She was refloated and put back to Liverpool.
Lady Mary Stewart	United Kingdom	The ship was wrecked on the Haaks Sandbank, in the North Sea off the coast of Zeeland, Netherlands. Her crew were rescued. She was on a voyage from the Clyde to Rotterdam, South Holland, Netherlands.
Lena	Denmark	The schooner was driven ashore on Hirsholmene. She was on a voyage from Hull, Yorkshire, United Kingdom to Lemvig. She was refloated the next day and taken in to Fredrikshavn.
Lion	United Kingdom	The schooner foundered in the North Sea 17 nautical miles (31 km) north of the Leman and Ower Bank. Her eight crew were rescued by the steamship Osborne (United Kingdom). Lion was on a voyage from South Shields, County Durham to London.
Mary, and a schooner	United Kingdom; Flag unknown	Mary was run into by a derelict schooner off the mouth of the Humber. She was abandoned and consequently foundered. Mary was on a voyage from Hartlepool, County Durham to London The schooner also foundered.
Mistress of the Seas	United Kingdom	The ship was driven ashore at Seacombe, Cheshire. She was on a voyage from Liverpool to Bombay. She was refloated and towed back to Liverpool.
Probe	United Kingdom	The brig departed from the River Tyne for Alexandria, Egypt. No further trace, presumed foundered with the loss of all hands.
Tamworth	Norway	The ship ran aground on the Trunk-hill Sandbank, in the Irish Sea off the coast of Lancashire. Her seventeen crew were rescued by the Southport Lifeboat. She was on a voyage from Liverpool to Havana, Cuba
Thames	United Kingdom	The ship foundered in the North Sea. Her crew were rescued. She was on a voyage from South Shields to the Nieuw Diep.
War Hawk	United Kingdom	The barque was lost off "Surraf". Her crew were rescued. She was on a voyage from Kronstadt, Russia to London.

== 2 November ==
List of shipwrecks: 2 November 1863
Ship	State	Description
Ann	United Kingdom	The schooner was driven ashore and capsized at Whitby, Yorkshire.
Anna Maria Z	United Kingdom	The ship was wrecked on the Girdler Sand, off the north Kent coast. Her crew survived. She was on a voyage from Buenos Aires, Argentina to London.
Caroline and Marie	Denmark	The ship was wrecked at Agger. She was on a voyage from London to Copenhagen.
Dauntless	United Kingdom	The ship sank in the Victoria Dock, London. She was on a voyage from Little Bay, Newfoundland, British North America to London. She was refloated on 17 September 1864.
Glance	United Kingdom	The schooner was driven ashore at Mostyn, Flintshire.
Guiding Star	United Kingdom	The brig was wrecked on the Serranilla Reef, off the Mosquito Coast. Her crew survived; four of them were rescued by Tamar (United Kingdom)
Henry	United Kingdom	The ship ran aground on the Trinity Sand, in the North Sea off the coast of Lincolnshire. She was on a voyage from South Shields, County Durham to Whitstable, Kent. She was refloated on 9 November and taken in to Grimsby, Lincolnshire.
Jersey	United Kingdom	The ship was driven ashore and wrecked "on Mallo". Her crew were rescued. She was on a voyage from an English port to Malmö, Sweden.
John	United Kingdom	The brig was driven ashore at Coatham, Yorkshire. Her crew were rescued. She was on a voyage from London to Hartlepool, County Durham.
Lady of the Lake	United Kingdom	The ship sank off Inchkeith, Fife.
Lion	United Kingdom	The brig was driven ashore north of the mouth of the River Tyne. Her crew were rescued by a steamboat.
Lord Byron	United Kingdom	The ship was driven ashore and wrecked at Filey Brigg, Yorkshire. She was on a voyage from Blyth, Northumberland to Caen, Calvados, France.
Maple	United Kingdom	The Mersey Flat sank in the River Mersey. She was refloated on 5 November.
Maria	Netherlands	The brig was driven ashore and damaged at Deal, Kent. She was on a voyage from Gijón, Spain to London. She was refloated and taken in to Margate, Kent in a leaky condition
Matthew	United Kingdom	The smack was driven ashore and severely damaged at Ballyquintin Point, Wigtownshire. Her crew were rescued. She was on a voyage from Dublin to Troon, Ayrshire.
Meerschaum	Netherlands	The ship ran aground on the Investigator Shoal. Eleven crew were rescued by Niphon (United Kingdom). Meerschaum was on a voyage from Manila, Spanish East Indies to Batavia, Netherlands East Indies.
Passport	(United Kingdom of Great Britain and Ireland) British North America	The steamship struck a rock and sank at Toronto, Province of Canada.
Pearl	United Kingdom	The ship was driven ashore at Greatstone, Kent. She was on a voyage from Liverpool, Lancashire to Rouen, Seine-Inférieure, France. She was refloated the next day and assisted in to Dover, Kent.
Prudence	United Kingdom	The schooner foundered off the Dudgeon Sand, in the North Sea. Her crew were rescued by the brig Caroline (United Kingdom). Prudence was on a voyage from Seaham, County Durham to Rochester, Kent.
Richard	United Kingdom	The schooner was driven ashore at Mostyn.
San Geralenna	Odesa	The ship was abandoned in the Atlantic Ocean with the loss of three of her crew. Survivors were rescued by Radosten ( Rostock). San Geralema was on a voyage from Odesa to Antwerp, Belgium.
Sara Hendrik	Flag unknown	The schooner was wrecked near Porthdinllaen, Caernarfonshire, United Kingdom with the loss of all hands.
Sofia	Sweden	The ship was driven ashore at "Hisinglandet".
Taje	(Russian Empire) Grand Duchy of Finland	The sloop struck a sunken wreck in the North Sea and was abandoned. She was on a voyage from Narva, Russia to Dundee, Forfarshire, United Kingdom.
Three Brothers	United Kingdom	The ship foundered in the English Channel off the coast of Devon. Her crew were rescued.
William George	United Kingdom	The brig was abandoned in the North Sea. Her crew were rescued. She was on a voyage from Schiedam, South Holland, Netherlands to Seaham.
William Sinclair	United Kingdom	The barque was beached at Penrhos, Anglesey. She was on a voyage from Newry, County Antrim to Cardiff, Glamorgan. She was refloated on 9 November and towed in to Holyhead, Anglesey.
Zwaluw	Netherlands	The ship was beached on Heligoland in a sinking condition. Her crew were rescued. She was on a voyage from Dundee to Harlingen, Friesland and/or Zwolle, Overijssel. She was consequently condemned.
Unnamed	flag unknown	The ship was wrecked at Niton, Isle of Wight.

== 3 November ==
List of shipwrecks: 3 November 1863
Ship	State	Description
Alarm	United States	The full-rigged ship was wrecked on the Preparis Reef, Burma, in the Bay of Bengal. Her crew were rescued by the full-rigged ship Sultana (United Kingdom). Alarm was on a voyage from Akyab, Burma to Singapore, Straits Settlements.
Amazon	United States	The packet ship was destroyed by fire off the North Foreland, Kent, United Kingdom. All on board were rescued by the Broadstairs, Kingsdown and Margate Lifeboats. She was on a voyage from Gravesend, Kent to New York.
Audax	United Kingdom	The ship departed from Carabourno, Ottoman Empire for London. No further trace, presumed foundered with the loss of all hands.
Avon	United Kingdom	The brig was lost off "Hangosund", Norway. Her crew were rescued. She was on a voyage from Riga, Russia to Hartlepool, County Durham.
Circassian	United Kingdom	The ship struck a rock and sak at Pori, Grand Duchy of Finland.
Deux Claire	France	The ship was driven ashore at Egmond aan Zee, North Holland, Netherlands. She was on a voyage from Constanţa, Ottoman Empire to Dunkirk, Nord.
Elise	United Kingdom	The ship was wrecked near Lemvig, Denmark. Her crew were rescued. She was on a voyage from Middlesbrough, Yorkshire to Varel, Kingdom of Hanover.
Elivine	Stettin	The ship was wrecked on the coast of Sweden. She was on a voyage from Hull, Yorkshire to Stettin.
Eliza Young	United Kingdom	The barque was driven ashore at Bullock's Point, Rhode Island, United States. She was on a voyage from Ardrossan, Ayrshire to Providence, Rhode Island. She was later refloated and taken in to Providence.
Endeavour	United Kingdom	The ship sank off the Dudgeon Sandbank, in the North Sea. Her crew survived.
Europa	Austrian Empire	The steamship was driven ashore near Larnaca, Ottoman Cyprus. She was on a voyage from Smyrna, Ottoman Empire to Beyrout, Ottoman Syria. Europa was refloated on 6 November with assistance from HMS Cossack (Royal Navy) and Impétueuse (French Navy) and taken in to Larnaca.
Johann Heinrich	Danzig	The ship was wrecked near Lemvig. Her crew were rescued. She was on a voyage from Exmouth, Devon, United Kingdom to Danzig.
Lord Byron	United Kingdom	The ship was driven ashore and sank at Filey, Yorkshire. Her crew were rescued. She was on a voyage from Blyth, Northumberland to Caen, Calvados, France.
Mark Breeds	United Kingdom	The schooner was abandoned in the North Sea. Her seven crew were rescued by the fishing smack Edwin (United Kingdom). Mark Breeds was on a voyage from Seaham, County Durham to Rochester, Kent.
Nor	Sweden	The brig ran aground whilst on a voyage from Gävle to Lowestoft, Suffolk, United Kingdom. She was refloated and put in to Mandal, Norway in a leaky condition.
Ocean Pearl	United Kingdom	The ship was destroyed by fire off Callao, Peru. She was on a voyage from Valparaíso, Chile to the Chincha Islands, Peru.
Orion	Bremen	The schooner was wrecked at Porthdinllaen, Caernarfonshire, United Kingdom. Her nine crew were rescued; four of them by the Pwllheli Lifeboat. She was on a voyage from Liverpool, Lancashire to Saint Thomas, Virgin Islands.
Otto	Norway	The ship departed from Randers for London, United Kingdom. No further trace, presumed foundered with the loss of all hands.
Speedwell	United States	The ship was beached on the coast of Somerset, United Kingdom. She was on a voyage from a port in New Brunswick, British North America to Penarth, Glamorgan, United Kingdom.
Thomas Edwards	United Kingdom	The ship was abandoned in the North Sea 15 nautical miles (28 km) north east of Cromer, Norfolk. She was on a voyage from South Shields, County Durham to Dartmouth, Devon.

== 4 November ==
List of shipwrecks: 4 November 1863
Ship	State	Description
Gipsy	United Kingdom	The ship was wrecked on the Dudgeon Sandbank, in the North Sea. Her crew were rescued by Pickering (United Kingdom). Gipsy was on a voyage from South Shields, County Durham to London.
Jane	United Kingdom	The collier, a brigantine, foundered in the North Sea 30 to 40 nautical miles (56 to 74 km) east of Spurn Point, Yorkshire with the loss of all ten crew.
Jan Hendrick de Jonge	Netherlands	The barque was wrecked at Porth Wen, Anglesey, United Kingdom.
Kelton	United Kingdom	The ship was wrecked at the mouth of the Pánuco River. Her crew were rescued. She was on a voyage from Tampico, Mexico to Liverpool, Lancashire.
Mary and Eliza	United Kingdom	The ship foundered in the North Sea off Cromer, Norfolk. She was on a voyage from Sunderland, County Durham to Amsterdam, North Holland, Netherlands.
Olga	Russia	The ship was wrecked on Langø, Denmark, She was on a voyage from Hull, Yorkshire, United Kingdom to Narva.
Plynlymon	United Kingdom	The steamship ran aground at Port Madoc, Caernarfonshire. She was on a voyage from Liverpool Lancashire to Port Madoc.
Queen	United Kingdom	The ship ran aground at Fishguard, Pembrokeshire and was severely damaged. She was on a voyage from Barrow in Furness, Lancashire to Swansea, Glamorgan. She was refloated on 7 November.
Sophia	United Kingdom	The ship departed from Aalborg, Denmark for London. No further trace, presumed foundered with the loss of all hands.
St. Eloi	France	The ship was destroyed by fire in the Atlantic Ocean 55 leagues (165 nautical miles (306 km) east south east of Bahia, Brazil. Her crew were rescued. She was on a voyage from Buenos Aires, Argentina to Marseille, Bouches-du-Rhône.
Zephyr	United Kingdom	The ship ran aground at Fishguard and was severely damaged. She was on a voyage from the Clyde to London. She was refloated on 7 November.
Unnamed	Flag unknown	The schooner was wrecked at Porth Wen.

== 5 November ==
List of shipwrecks: 5 November 1863
Ship	State	Description
Curlew	United States	The 343-ton screw steamer collided with the steamer Louisiana (Flag unknown) and sank in the Chesapeake Bay off Point Lookout, Maryland.
Nestor	United Kingdom	The brig was wrecked on Amrum, Duchy of Holstein. Her crew were rescued. She was on a voyage from Hartlepool, County Durham to Hamburg.
Nassau	United States	The 518-ton steamer sank at Brazos Pass on the coast of Texas, Confederate States of America.
Partridge	United States	The schooner was lost at Brazos Pass.
Queen of the Netherlands	United Kingdom	The barque foundered in the Atlantic Ocean. Her crew were rescued by the schooner Arche (Kingdom of Hanover). Queen of the Netherlands was on a voyage from Sunderland, County Durham to Alexandria, Egypt Eyalet.
Sicilia	Italy	The barque was wrecked on the Hartwell Reef, off Boa Vista, Cape Verde Islands with the loss of 72 of the 154 people on board. She was on a voyage from Genoa to Montevideo, Uruguay.
Unnamed	United Kingdom	The brigantine foundered in the Atlantic Ocean 20 nautical miles (37 km) east of Ouessant, Finistère, France with the loss of all hands.

== 6 November ==
List of shipwrecks: 6 November 1863
Ship	State	Description
Amanda	United States	American Civil War, CSS Alabama's Indian Ocean Expeditionary Raid: The 598-ton barque, bound from Manila, Spanish East Indies to Queenstown, County Cork, United Kingdom, with a cargo of hemp and sugar, was captured and burned in the Netherlands East Indies or Indian Ocean by the screw sloop-of-war CSS Alabama (Confederate States Navy).
Anine	Sweden	The ship was wrecked near Strömstad with the loss of 21 of her crew. She was on a voyage from Newcastle upon Tyne, Northumberland, United Kingdom to Aalborg, Denmark.
Brigand	United Kingdom	The brigantine was abandoned in the North Sea off Flamborough Head, Yorkshire. Her crew were rescued by a smack. She was on a voyage from Villareal, Spain to Newcastle upon Tyne. She was seen to founder 35 nautical miles (65 km) north east of the Lemon and Ower Lightship ( Trinity House) by Heimdal (United Kingdom).
Christian Ludwig	Danzig	The ship was abandoned in the Skaggerak. Her crew were rescued by Fina (Sweden). Christian Ludwig was on a voyage from Danzig or Stralsund to Dublin, United Kingdom.
Isis	United Kingdom	The ship was wrecked near "Wingo", Sweden. She was on a voyage from Leith, Lothian to "Oscarsbourne".
Jane and Agnes	United Kingdom	The schooner was driven ashore at Garwick Glen, Isle of Man and was abandoned by her crew. She was on a voyage from Liverpool, Lancashire to Douglas, Isle of Man. She was refloated with assistance from the paddle steamer Mona's Queen ( (United Kingdom of Great Britain and Ireland) ) Isle of Man) and towed in to Douglas.
Juno	United Kingdom	The ship was driven ashore near "Frederick VII Koog". She was on a voyage from Hamburg to South Shields, County Durham.
Margarethe	Hamburg	The barque was driven ashore at Harboøre, Denmark. Her crew were rescued. She was on a voyage from Hamburg to Hartlepool, County Durham.
Quebec Packet	United Kingdom	The ship was abandoned in the Baltic Sea. She was on a voyage from Riga, Russia to London.
Sarah	United Kingdom	The ship was driven ashore at Llandudno, Caernarfonshire. She was on a voyage from Garston, Lancashire to Holyhead, Anglesey.
St. Catherine	Netherlands	The ship ran aground off Skagen, Denmark and was wrecked. She was on a voyage from Saint Petersburg, Russia to London, United Kingdom.

== 7 November ==
List of shipwrecks: 7 November 1863
Ship	State	Description
Abrahams Minde	Denmark	The ship was driven ashore and wrecked at Lemvig. She was on a voyage from Rønne to Newcastle upon Tyne, Northumberland, United Kingdom.
Allen Collier	United States	American Civil War: The steamer was boarded and burned by Confederate guerillas at her mooring on the Mississippi River at Bolivar Landing or Whitworth's Landing in Mississippi, Confederate States of America, across from and about 1 nautical mile (1.9 km) above Laconia, Arkansas, Confederate States of America.
Angelicana	United Kingdom	The ship was driven ashore and wrecked in the Aspö Islands. Her crew were rescued. She was on a voyage from Frederikshavn, Denmark to an English port.
Brechin	United Kingdom	The brig sprang a leak and foundered in the Dogger Bank. Her crew were rescued by the fishing smack Queen (United Kingdom). Brechin was on a voyage from Gibraltar to Newcastle upon Tyne.
Carolina	United States	The ship was abandoned in the Baltic Sea. She was on a voyage from Kronstadt, Russia to New York. She was subsequently taken in to the Aspö Islands.
Catharina	Kingdom of Hanover	The ship was driven ashore and wrecked at Lemvig. She was on a voyage from Holmstad, Norway to London, United Kingdom.
Eliome	United Kingdom	The ship was wrecked. Her crew survived. She was on a voyage from Hull, Yorkshire to Stettin.
Eliza Gann	United Kingdom	The schooner was driven ashore at Lowestoft, Suffolk. She was refloated with assistance from the tug Powerful (United Kingdom).
Emanuel	United Kingdom	The ship was wrecked on the Klitmoller Sand, in the North Sea. Her crew were rescued. She was on a voyage from Hartlepool, County Durham to Aalborg, Denmark.
James Dixon	United Kingdom	The steamship collided with the brig Eli ( Austrian Empire) at the mouth of the River Tyne. She then ran aground and sank at South Shields, County Durham. Her crew were rescued by the North Shields and South Shields Lifeboats. James Dixon was refloated on 22 November and taken in to South Shields. She was subsequently salvaged, rebuilt and returned to service.
Lord Seaham	United Kingdom	The ship was abandoned in the North Sea. Her crew were rescued by Frances Anne (United Kingdom). Lord Seaham was on a voyage from Seaham, County Durham to London.
Madonna	United Kingdom	The derelict brig was abandoned at sea. Her crew were rescued by Janets (United Kingdom). Madonna was on a voyage from Sundsvall, Sweden to Hartlepool, County Durham. She was driven ashore at "Wexoe", Denmark on 13 November.
Margaretha	Hamburg	The ship was driven ashore and wrecked at Lemvig. She was on a voyage from Hamburg to Newcastle upon Tyne, Northumberland, United Kingdom.
Regent	United Kingdom	The schooner was driven ashore and wrecked at Ostend, West Flanders, Belgium. Her crew were rescued. She was on a voyage from Charleston, South Carolina, Confederate States of America to Ostend.
Sarah	United Kingdom	The smack collided with Coronella (United Kingdom) and sank in the River Mersey. She was on a voyage from Liverpool, Lancashire to the Isle of Man.
Sea Nymph	United Kingdom	The ship struck rocks in the North Channel. She was towed in to a port in the Colony of Natal in a leaky condition.
Union	United States	The barque struck the Pilot Rock, off Arichat, Nova Scotia, British North America. She capsized and sank. She was on a voyage from New York to Pictou, Nova Scotia.
Unnamed	United Kingdom	The brig collided with the steamship Olaf (Russia) and sank off "Nytelene Island" with the loss of all hands.

== 8 November ==
List of shipwrecks: 8 November 1863
Ship	State	Description
Anandale	United Kingdom	The ship was abandoned in the North Sea in a sinking condition. Her crew were rescued by Mary Young (United Kingdom). Anandale was on a voyage from Thessaloniki, Greece to Hull, Yorkshire.
Arthur Leary	United Kingdom	The brig was driven ashore at Newhaven, Sussex. All thirteen people on board were rescued. She was on a voyage from London to Lisbon, Portugal. Arthur Leary had become a wreck by 12 November.
Commerce	United Kingdom	The schooner ran aground on the Barber Sand, in the North Sea off the coast of Norfolk. She was on a voyage form Blyth, Northumberland to Gravesend, Kent. She was refloated and put in to Great Yarmouth, Norfolk in a leaky condition.
Cornubia	Confederate States of America	American Civil War, Union blockade: Pursued by the screw steamer USS Niphon (United States Navy), the sidewheel paddle steamer was run aground by her crew near New Inlet, North Carolina. She was then captured by Union forces.
Medusa	United Kingdom	The barque was wrecked at East London, British Kaffraria. Her crew were rescued, but a rescuer was lost. She was on a voyage from London to the Colony of Natal.
Planter	United Kingdom	The ship was driven ashore and wrecked at Kessingland, Suffolk. Her crew were rescued. She was on a voyage from Sunderland, County Durham to Rye, Sussex.
Prince Albert	United Kingdom	The ship ran aground at Whitby, Yorkshire. She was on a voyage from the River Tyne to London.
Pursuit	United Kingdom	The ship was driven ashore at Løkken-Vrå, Denmark, Her crew were rescued. She was on a voyage from Hamburg to Swansea, Glamorgan.
Shepherd	United Kingdom	The ship was driven ashore on Skagens Rev and wrecked south of Skagen, Denmark. She was on a voyage from Stettin to Leith, Lothian.
Sophie	France	The ship was driven ashore east of Gravelines, Nord. Her crew were rescued.
Themis	United Kingdom	The brig foundered in the North Sea (55°33′N 5°45′E). Her crew were rescued. She was on a voyage from North Shields, Northumberland to the Nieuw Diep.
Venture	Italy	The brig ran aground on the Half Ebb Rock, off Harwich, Essex, United Kingdom.

== 9 November ==
List of shipwrecks: 9 November 1863
Ship	State	Description
Alexina	United Kingdom	The ship was wrecked near the mouth of the Rio Grande. She was on a voyage from Matamoros, Mexico to New York, United States.
Anglia	United Kingdom	The paddle steamer ran aground in the Aran Islands, County Galway and was damaged. She was on a voyage from Liverpool, Lancashire to Boston, Massachusetts, United States. She was refloated the next day and put in to Galway. Anglia was subsequently repaired at Liverpool.
Arion	Denmark	The barque collided with another barque and was beached at Seaham, County Durham, United Kingdom and was abandoned by all but two of her crew. She was on a voyage from Copenhagen to Sunderland, County Durham. She was refloated the next day.
Artemas	United Kingdom	The ship ran aground on the Stoney Binks, off the mouth of the Humber. She was on a voyage from the Humber to Sunderland. She put in to Whitby, Yorkshire the next day in a leaky condition.
Czar	United Kingdom	The steamship ran aground in Gibraltar Bay. She was on a voyage from Patras, Greece to Liverpool, Lancashire. She was refloated with the assistance of a tug.
Flora	Denmark	The brig collided with an American liner and was abandoned in the English Channel off Dungeness, Kent, United Kingdom. Her crew were rescued by a Norwegian vessel. Flora was on a voyage from Rio de Janeiro, Brazil to Christiania, Norway.
George Robinson	United Kingdom	The brig was beached in the River Blackwater. She was on a voyage from London to Hartlepool, County Durham.
Hirondelle	France	The ketch was driven ashore at Kingsdown, Kent with the loss of all hands.
Matchless	United Kingdom	The schooner was driven ashore on Læsø, Denmark.
Postillonen	Sweden	The sloop was driven ashore and wrecked on Læsø. She was on a voyage from Karlskrona to Newcastle upon Tyne, Northumberland, United Kingdom.
Stirling	United Kingdom	The brig was driven ashore at Whitby, Yorkshire. She was on a voyage from London to Souths Shields. She was refloated.
Vine	United Kingdom	The ship was driven ashore at Wells-next-the-Sea, Norfolk. Her crew survived. She was on a voyage from Goole, Yorkshire to London.
Viscamo	Bremen	The brig was wrecked on the Longsand, in the North Sea off the coast of Essex, United Kingdom. She was on a voyage from Bremen to Mayagüez, Puerto Rico.
Vriendschap	Netherlands	The ship was wrecked on Læsø. She was on a voyage from Rotterdam, South Holland to Danzig.
Three unnamed vessels	Flags unknown	A barque and two schooners were driven ashore at the Landguard Fort, Felixtowe, Suffolk.

== 10 November ==
List of shipwrecks: 10 November 1863
Ship	State	Description
RMS Anglia	United Kingdom	The steamship struck the Black Rock, off Galway. She was on a voyage from Liverpool, Lancashire to Boston, Massachusetts, United States. She was refloated and taken in to Galway.
Anna Catrina	United Kingdom	The ship ran aground on the Stoney Binks, in the North Sea off the mouth of the Humber. She was on a voyage from Newcastle upon Tyne, Northumberland to Alexandria, Egypt. She was refloated and put in to Grimsby, Lincolnshire in a leaky condition.
Eagle	United Kingdom	The ship was wrecked at Salo, Grand Duchy of Finland. Her crew were rescued. She was on a voyage from Vyborg, Grand Duchy of Finland to Hull, Yorkshire.
Familien	Norway	The brig ran aground and was wrecked at Hayle, Cornwall, United Kingdom. Her crew survived.
Frederikka	Norway	The ship collided with a smack and ran aground on the Leman and Ower Sand, in the North Sea off the coast of Norfolk, United Kingdom. She was on a voyage from Sundsvall to London, United Kingdom. She was refloated and taken in to Grimsby, Lincolnshire, United Kingdom in a leaky condition.
Glencairn	United Kingdom	The barque was sighted off the Brisons, off the Cornish coast. Presumed subsequently foundered with the loss of all hands. She was on a voyage from Quebec City, Province of Canada, British North America to Hayle.
Orion	Denmark	The ship was driven ashore near Seaham, County Durham, United Kingdom. Her crew were rescued.
Winged Racer	United States	American Civil War, CSS Alabama's Indian Ocean Expeditionary Raid: During a voyage from Manila, Spanish East Indies to New York with a cargo of camphor, hemp, hides, jute, porcelain, and sugar, the 1,768-ton clipper was captured and burned in the Java Sea near the Sunda Strait by the screw sloop-of-war CSS Alabama (Confederate States Navy).

== 11 November ==
List of shipwrecks: 11 November 1863
Ship	State	Description
Adrien	France	The lugger was wrecked at Gunwalloe, Cornwall, United Kingdom with the loss of four of her five crew. She was on a voyage from Newport, Monmouthshire to Rochefort, Charente-Inférieure.
Captain John Brickell	United States	The 188-ton sternwheel paddle steamer collided with a flatboat on the Ohio River, ran ashore on the Ohio side of the river, and sank in shallow water at West Columbia, Confederate States of America. She later was refloated.
Contest	United States	American Civil War, CSS Alabama's Indian Ocean Expeditionary Raid: The 1,098-ton clipper, carrying a cargo of Chinese silk, tea, and goods from Yokohama, Japan, to New York City, was captured and burned off the Gaspar Strait in the Netherlands East Indies by the screw sloop-of-war CSS Alabama (Confederate States Navy).
Edith Pepper	United Kingdom	The barque was wrecked on the Sandawood Reefs, in the South China Sea with the loss of six of her crew. She was on a voyage from Liverpool, Lancashire to China.
Herman	Denmark	The brig was driven ashore and wrecked at "Plumeour", Finistère, France. Her six crew were rescued.
Leon Isabella	France	The chasse-marée was driven ashore at "Donamenenez", France with the loss of all but two of her crew. She was on a voyage from Cardiff, Glamorgan, United Kingdom to Nantes, Loire-Inférieure.
London	United Kingdom	The schooner foundered off Gurnard's Head, Cornwall with the loss of all seven crew. She subsequently came ashore at Zennor.
Pauline	France	The lugger was wrecked at Brest, Finistère with the loss of all hands.
Penelope	United Kingdom	The ship ran aground on the Hovdend, off the Dutch coast. She was on a voyage from Whitehaven, Cumberland to Rotterdam, South Holland, Netherlands. She was refloated and assisted in to Hellevoetsluis, Zeeland, Netherlands.
Providence	United Kingdom	The schooner foundered 25 nautical miles (46 km) off Cape Cornwall, Cornwall with the loss of five or six of her crew. Two survivors were rescued by the steamship East Anglian (United Kingdom). Providence was on a voyage from Newport, Monmouthshire to Plymouth, Devon.
Thomas and Elizabeth	(United Kingdom of Great Britain and Ireland) Guernsey	The ship was driven ashore and damaged at Saint-Malo, Ille-et-Vilaine, France.
Transit	United Kingdom	The brig was wrecked in the Magdalen Islands, Nova Scotia, British North America with the loss of seven of her crew. She was on a voyage from Quebec City, Province of Canada, British North America to Whitehaven, Cumberland.
William	United Kingdom	The smack was driven against the pier and sank at Brixham, Devon.
Unnamed	Norway	The brig was wrecked at Hayle, Cornwall. Her crew survived.
Unnamed	Flag unknown	The ship foundered 2 nautical miles (3.7 km) off Landunvez, Finistère with the loss of all hands.

== 12 November ==
List of shipwrecks: 12 November 1863
Ship	State	Description
Almora	United Kingdom	The ship capsized and sank at Liverpool, Lancashire. She was refloated on 17 November.
Commodore	United Kingdom	The brigantine ran aground on the Shipwash Sand, in the North Sea off the coast of Suffolk. She was on a voyage from Agrigento, Sicily, Italy to Ipswich, Suffolk. She was refloated with the assistance of a number of smacks and taken in to Harwich, Essex in a leaky condition.
Criminil Rath Brandt	Prussia	The ship ran aground on the Longsand, in the North Sea off the coast of Essex, United Kingdom. She was on a voyage from Königsberg to Gloucester. She was refloated on 14 November with assistance from the smack Eight (United Kingdom) and taken in to Harwich, Essex in a leaky condition.
Enchantress	United Kingdom	The brig collided with the barque Petronella (Netherlands) and sank in the English Channel off Dover, Kent. She was on a voyage from Rouen, Seine-Inférieure, France to Newcastle upon Tyne, Northumberland.
Gustave	France	The brig was driven ashore and wrecked at Mostaganem, India. Her crew survived. She was on a voyage from India to an English port.
Julia	United Kingdom	The brigantine was driven ashore and wrecked at Blakeney, Norfolk. She was on a voyage from Sunderland, County Durham to Exeter, Devon.
Mœrles	Italy	The ship was abandoned off The Lizard, Cornwall, United Kingdom. Her crew were rescued. She was on a voyage from Swansea, Glamorgan, United Kingdom to Naples.
Stucley	United Kingdom	The smack was driven ashore and severely damaged at Clovelly, Devon. She was on a voyage from Newport, Monmouthshire to Bude, Cornwall. She was refloated the next day.
Tamaya	United Kingdom	The ship ran aground in the River Mersey. She was on a voyage from Valparaíso, Chile to Liverpool. She was refloated.
Victoria Cross	United Kingdom	The ship ran aground on the Sizewell Bank, in the North Sea off the coast of Suffolk. She was on a voyage from Sunderland, County Durham to Bombay, India. She was refloated the next day and resumed her voyage.

== 13 November ==
List of shipwrecks: 13 November 1863
Ship	State	Description
John Stanton Jr.	United Kingdom	The ship ran aground off Cardiff, Glamorgan. She was on a voyage from Cardiff to Shanghai, China. She was refloated and towed in to Bristol, Gloucestershire in a leaky condition.
Maritana	United Kingdom	The brig was wrecked on North Uist, Outer Hebrides. Her six crew survived. She was on a voyage from Belfast, County Antrim to a port in Northumberland.
Prince Alfred	United Kingdom	The ship ran aground at a port in the Colony of Natal.
Sunbury	(United Kingdom of Great Britain and Ireland) British North America	The ship exploded and sank at Charlottetown, Prince Edward Island. She was on a voyage from "Indian Town" to Frederickton, Newfoundland.
Sunnyside	United States	Carrying a cargo of cotton, the 330-ton sidewheel paddle steamer burned on the Ohio River near Island No 16 at Pomeroy, Ohio, with the loss of 30 to 40 lives.
Unnamed	Flag unknown	The ship collided with Penelope (United Kingdom) and sank. Her crew were rescued by Egepatera (Greece).

== 14 November ==
List of shipwrecks: 14 November 1863
Ship	State	Description
Anna Kimball	United Kingdom	The full-rigged ship ran aground in the River Tay. She was on a voyage from Dundee, Forfarshire to Calcutta, India. She was refloated with the assistance of the tug Samson (United Kingdom) and taken in to Dundee in a severely leaky condition.
Diana	United Kingdom	The steamship ran aground in the Bomarsund. She was refloated.
La Foi	France	The ship was towed in to Lorient, Morbihan in a sinking condition. She was on a voyage from Cardiff, Glamorgan, United Kingdom to Montevideo, Uruguay.
Madonna della Libera	Italy	The ship was struck by lightning, sprang a leak and sank in the Gulf of Lyons. Her crew were rescued by Mogador Packet (United Kingdom).
Moult	United Kingdom	The smack was wrecked at Milford Haven, Pembrokeshire. She was on a voyage from "Landshipping" to Hayle, Cornwall.
Queen of England	United Kingdom	The ship departed from Colombo, Ceylon for London. No further trace, presumed foundered with the loss of all hands.

== 15 November ==
List of shipwrecks: 15 November 1863
Ship	State	Description
Aquila	United States	The wreck of Aquila (Illustration from Harper's Weekly, 16 January 1864). Carrying the disassembled monitor Camanche (United States), the full-rigged ship sank during a storm while moored at Hathaway's Wharf in San Francisco, California. Aquila and her cargo were salvaged, and Camanche was commissioned a year later.
Alarm	United States	The clipper ran aground on the Preparis Reef. She was on a voyage from Akyab, Burma to Singapore. Her crew were rescued on 18 November by Sultana (Flag unknown). Although she floated off and was reboarded, she was abandoned as a total loss.
USS Lehigh	United States Navy	American Civil War: The monitor ran aground off Sullivan's Island, South Carolina, Confederate States of America, under heavy fire by Confederate forces. She was pulled free on the morning of 16 November by the monitor USS Nahant (United States Navy).
Ontario	United Kingdom	The full-rigged ship was wrecked in the Bay of Buena Vista. She was on a voyage from Matanzas, Cuba to London.
William H. Stevens	United States	William H. Stevens The wooden schooner ran aground in Lake Huron off the coast of Michigan between Bird Island and Scarecrow Island and eventually broke up. her wreck lies in 10 feet (3 m) of water at 44.896217°N 83.32755°W.

== 16 November ==
List of shipwrecks: 16 November 1863
Ship	State	Description
Belle Brune	France	The ship struck The Manacles. She was on a voyage from Saint-Brieuc, Côtes-du-Nord to Cardiff, Glamorgan, United Kingdom. She put in to Falmouth, Cornwall, United Kingdom in a leaky condition.
City of Montreal	(United Kingdom of Great Britain and Ireland)	The ship ran aground in the Saint Lawrence River 4 nautical miles (7.4 km) upstream of Rimouski, Province of Canada. She was on a voyage from Quebec City, Province of Canada to Liverpool, Lancashire. She was refloated and resumed her voyage.
Gratitude	United Kingdom	The ship ran aground at "Landsholm". she was on a voyage from Kronstadt, Russia to London. She was refloated with assistance and resumed her voyage.
Isca	Flag unknown	The vessel went aground in San Francisco Bay during a storm.
Margaret	United Kingdom	The schooner collided with the full-rigged ship Magnificent (United Kingdom) and sank in the River Mersey. Her crew were rescued.
Nepenthe	United Kingdom	The ship was wrecked 3 nautical miles (5.6 km) west of Hartland Point, Devon with the loss of five lives. She was on a voyage from London to Cardiff.
Ostsee	Hamburg	The steamship was driven ashore at Løkken-Vrå, Denmark. She was on a voyage from Kiel, Prussia, via Frederikshavn to Hamburg.
Pandar	United Kingdom	The ship was driven ashore at Saltfleet, Lincolnshire. She was on a voyage from Teignmouth, Devon to Stockton-on-Tees, County Durham.
Stella Mahitana	Netherlands	The schooner was abandoned in the Atlantic Ocean. Her crew were rescued cr General Havelock (United Kingdom). Stella Mahitana was on a voyage from Hamburg to Saint Domingo.
Sylph	United Kingdom	The ship ran aground on the Goodwin Sands, Kent. She was on a voyage from London to São Miguel Island, Azores. She was refloated and taken in to The Downs.
William	United Kingdom	The ship collided with Magnificent (United Kingdom) and sank in the River Mersey. She was on a voyage from Liverpool to Boulogne, Pas-de-Calais, France.

== 17 November ==
List of shipwrecks: 17 November 1863
Ship	State	Description
Breeze	United Kingdom	The brig was driven ashore on Poplar Island, Maryland, United States. She was on a voyage from Baltimore, Maryland to Barbados. She was refloated and put back to Baltimore.
Brilliant	United Kingdom	The ship was wrecked near St Catherine's Point, Isle of Wight. She was on a voyage from Cork to Poole, Dorset.
Luna	United Kingdom	The ship was driven ashore and wrecked at Koppalin, Prussia. Her crew were rescued. She was on a voyage from Danzig to London.
Queen	United Kingdom	The ship was lost on Hogland, Russia. Her crew were rescued. She was on a voyage from Kronstadt, Russia to Bristol, Gloucestershire.
Teviotdale	United Kingdom	The ship ran aground in the River Mersey. She was on a voyage from Quebec City, Province of Canada, British North America to Liverpool, Lancashire. She was refloated the next day and taken in to the Sloyne.
18 to 20 unidentified boats	Confederate States of America	American Civil War: The boats were destroyed on the Piankatank River in Mathews County, Virginia, by a Union expedition.

== 18 November ==
List of shipwrecks: 18 November 1863
Ship	State	Description
Amazon	United Kingdom	The ship sank4 nautical miles (7.4 km) north of Ilfracombe, Devon. Her crew survived. She was on a voyage from Newport, Monmouthshire to Barcelona, Spain.
Bagley	United States Army	The 396-bulk-ton sidewheel paddle steamer sank at Aransas Pass on the coast of Texas, Confederate States of America.
Charlotte	(United Kingdom of Great Britain and Ireland) New Zealand	The 40-ton cutter was lost near Sumner with the loss of all hands during a gale. Her upturned hull was sighted three days later off Pigeon Bay, Banks Peninsula.
Eslington	United Kingdom	The barque collided with the transport ship King Arthur (United Kingdom) and foundered in the Atlantic Ocean (49°32′N 9°20′W). Her crew were rescued by King Arthur, which lost a crew member during the rescue. Eslington was on a voyage from South Shields, County Durham to Constantinople, Ottoman Empire.
Penelope	United Kingdom	The ship collided with another vessel and sank. Her crew were rescued by Egeratacia (United Kingdom). Penelope was on a voyage from South Shields, County Durham to Garrucha, Spain.
Radiant	United Kingdom	The barque was driven ashore on "Tekerskar" or "Treskow. She was on a voyage from Kronstadt, Russia to London.
Robert Gilroy	United Kingdom	The full-rigged ship was destroyed by fire in the Indian Ocean. Her crew were rescued. She was on a voyage from Dundee, Forfarshire to Calcutta, India.
Thirteen unidentified vessels	Confederate States of America	American Civil War, Union blockade: A Union expedition destroyed a sloop and 12 boats at Gwynn's Island in the Chesapeake Bay off the coast of Virginia, Confederate States of America.

== 19 November ==
List of shipwrecks: 19 November 1863
Ship	State	Description
Alcee	Italy	The schooner ran aground on the Goodwin Sands, Kent, United Kingdom. She was on a voyage from North Shields, Northumberland, United Kingdom to Naples. She was refloated the next day with assistance from the lugger Buffalo Gal and towed in to Ramsgate, Kent by the tug Success (both United Kingdom).
Hero of Kars	United Kingdom	The ship was abandoned at sea. Her crew were rescued by the barque Lutcken (Kingdom of Hanover). Hero of Kars was on a voyage from Newcastle upon Tyne, Northumberland to Gibraltar.
Perseverante	France	The schooner was driven ashore at Blyth, Northumberland. She was on a voyage from Caen, Calvados to Blyth.
Raffaella	Mexico	Second French intervention in Mexico: The schooner was sunk by the French at Champotón.
Unnamed	Flag unknown	The brig was driven ashore on Little Cumbrae, Ayrshire.

== 20 November ==
List of shipwrecks: 20 November 1863
Ship	State	Description
Brigadier	United Kingdom	The steamship ran aground on Whitburn Steel, off the coast of County Durham. She was refloated and taken in to South Shields.
Charles	United Kingdom	The ship was abandoned in the Atlantic Ocean. Her 24 crew were rescued by Paragon (United Kingdom). Charles was on a voyage from Saint John, New Brunswick, British North America to London.
Janet Patterson	United Kingdom	The ship was driven ashore in the Magdalen Islands, Nova Scotia, British North America. She was on a voyage from Richibucto, New Brunswick to Liverpool, Lancashire.
King Arthur	United Kingdom	The clipper was wrecked on Pongok Island, Netherlands East Indies. She was on a voyage from Shanghai, China to London.
Lancashire Lass	United Kingdom	The ship sank off Douglas, Isle of Man. Her crew were rescued. She was on a voyage from Runcorn, Cheshire to Douglas. She was refloated on 25 November and taken in to Douglas.
Manhattan	United States	The barque was driven ashore at Chatham, Massachusetts.
Sclorenza	Papal States	The brig was driven ashore and wrecked at Breaksea Point, Glamorgan, United Kingdom. She was on a voyage from Cardiff, Glamorgan to Civitavecchia.
Silver Cord	(United Kingdom of Great Britain and Ireland) British North America	The schooner was driven ashore at St. Michael's. She was on a voyage from Toronto, Province of Canada to Halifax, Nova Scotia.
Sparrow Hawk	United Kingdom	The smack collided with the smack Standard (United Kingdom) and foundered in the North Sea. Her crew were rescued by Standard.

== 21 November ==
List of shipwrecks: 21 November 1863
Ship	State	Description
Black Hawk	United States	American Civil War: The 26-ton sidewheel transport ran onto the bank of the Mississippi River at Hay Point, Louisiana, 1 nautical mile (1.9 km) below the mouth of the Red River of the South, with her upper works destroyed after being ambushed by the 1st Louisiana Regiment (Confederate States Army).
Margaret Reid	United Kingdom	The ship ran aground on the Falsterbo Reef, in the Baltic Sea. She was on a voyage from Königsberg, Prussia to London. She was refloated and put in to Helsingør, Denmark in a leaky condition.
Mesopotamia	United Kingdom	The ship was driven ashore in the Shinnecock Inlet. She was on a voyage from Liverpool, Lancashire to New York, United States.
Negociant	France	The brig was driven ashore at Swansea, Glamorgan, United Kingdom.
Thirsk	United Kingdom	The schooner departed from Grangemouth, Stirlingshire for Middlesbrough, Yorkshire. No further trace, presumed foundered with the loss of all hands.

== 22 November ==
List of shipwrecks: 22 November 1863
Ship	State	Description
Celine	United Kingdom	The ship was driven ashore at the mouth of the River Avon. She was on a voyage from Algiers, Algeria to Bristol, Gloucestershire. She was refloated the next day.
Kate	Spain	The brig ran aground on The Shingles, off the Isle of Wight, United Kingdom. She was on a voyage from South Shields, County Durham, United Kingdom to Cartagena, Spain. She was refloated and towed in to Cowes, Isle of Wight.
Royal William	United Kingdom	The ship foundered in the North Sea. Her crew were rescued by the schooner Alvilde (Denmark). Royal William was on a voyage from Sunderland, County Durham to Hamburg.
Spring	United Kingdom	The ship was driven ashore at Ramsgate, Kent. She was on a voyage from London to Havre de Grâce, Seine-Inférieure, France. She was refloated and towed in to Ramsgate.

== 23 November ==
List of shipwrecks: 23 November 1863
Ship	State	Description
Amelia	United Kingdom	The ship was driven ashore near Crosby, Lancashire. She was on a voyage from Livorno, Italy to Liverpool, Lancashire.
David Crockett	United States	The ship ran aground at New York. She was on a voyage from San Francisco, California to New York and Liverpool. She was refloated.
Devonshire	United Kingdom	The ship was driven ashore near Crosby in a capsized condition.
Généreuse	France	The schooner collided with the brig Kate (United Kingdom) and sank in the North Sea off Whitby, Yorkshire, United Kingdom. Her crew were rescued by Kate.
Gertrude	Sweden	The ship departed from Gothenburg for Bombay, India. No further trace, presumed foundered with the loss of all hands.
Hope	United Kingdom	The schooner ran aground at Lowestoft, Suffolk. She was on a voyage from Middlesbrough, Yorkshire to Margate, Kent. She was refloated.
Hudsons	United Kingdom	The ship was sighted off Dover, Kent whilst on a voyage from the River Wear to Kronstadt, Russia. No further trace, presumed foundered with the loss of all hands.
Jolly	United Kingdom	The barque ran aground on The Shingles, off the Isle of Wight. She was on a voyage from North Shields, Northumberland to Cartagena, Spain. She refloated and towed in to Cowes, Isle of Wight.
Survey	United Kingdom	The full-rigged ship ran aground in the Hooghly River. She was on a voyage from London to Calcutta, India. She was refloated and completed her voyage.
Unidentified vessels	Confederate States of America	American Civil War, Union blockade: A joint expedition by elements of the 52nd Pennsylvania Infantry Regiment (Union Army), the vessel May Queen (United States), and the armed sidewheel paddle steamer USS Mahaska and gunboat USS General Putnam (both United States Navy) burned three schooners, scows, and boats on the East River in Mathews County.

== 24 November ==
List of shipwrecks: 24 November 1863
Ship	State	Description
Elbe	United Kingdom	The brig foundered in the North Sea. Her crew were rescued by the schooner Fredericks (Denmark). Elbe was on a voyage from Cuxhaven to South Shields, County Durham.
Judith	United Kingdom	The schooner was driven ashore at Boulmer, Northumberland. She was refloated.
Lady Buller	United Kingdom	The schooner was driven ashore at Boulmer. She was on a voyage from Bo'ness, Lothian to Dieppe, Seine-Inférieure, France. She was refloated.
Mary	United Kingdom	The brig collided with the brigantine Ann (United Kingdom) and ran aground at Ayr.
Morning Light	United Kingdom	The ship ran aground in the River Mersey. She was on a voyage from Bombay, India to Liverpool, Lancashire. She was refloated the next day and taken in to Liverpool.
Pervorodna Wielizzi Poppovich	Russia	The ship was wrecked near Trieste.
Sisters	United Kingdom	The schooner was driven ashore at Boulmer. She was on a voyage from Montrose, Forfarshire to London. She was refloated and found to be leaky.
Svensk Flagg	Sweden	The brig was driven ashore in Glencallum Bay. She was on a voyage from the Clyde to a Swedish port.
Visitor	United Kingdom	The schooner collided with the steamship Barcelona (Spain) and sank off the Tongue Lightship ( Trinity House). Her crew were rescued by Barcelona. Visitor was on a voyage from Mogador, Morocco to London.

== 25 November ==
List of shipwrecks: 25 November 1863
Ship	State	Description
Allen Howsten	United Kingdom	The ship ran aground off Filey, Yorkshire and was abandoned by her crew. She was on a voyage from South Shields, County Durham to London.
Bertha	United Kingdom	The schooner was driven ashore at Souter Point, Northumberland. She was on a voyage from Cornwall to Leith, Lothian. She was refloated.
Jeboyne	United Kingdom	The ship foundered off Donaghadee, County Down. Her crew were rescued. She was on a voyage from Maryport, Cumberland to Belfast, County Antrim.
Nellie Moore	United States	The 226-ton sternwheel paddle steamer was stranded on Cumberland Island in Kentucky.
Unnamed	United Kingdom	The smack was driven ashore and wrecked at Dunoon, Argyllshire. Her crew were rescued.

== 26 November ==
List of shipwrecks: 26 November 1863
Ship	State	Description
Carleton	United Kingdom	The brig ran ashore at Flamborough Head, Yorkshire. She was on a voyage from London to Seaham, County Durham.
Elizabeth	United Kingdom	The schooner ran ashore at Flamborough head. She was on a voyage from Exeter, Devon to South Shields, County Durham.
Glengarry	United Kingdom	The brig ran aground on the Goodwin Sands, Kent. She was on a voyage from London to Cardiff, Glamorgan. She was refloated.
Isabella	United Kingdom	The ship was abandoned in the North Sea. Her crew survived.
Isis	United Kingdom	The schooner ran ashore at Flamborough Head. She was on a voyage from Guernsey, Channel Islands to South Shields.
Mary Ann	Confederate States of America	The schooner was bound from Calcasieu, Louisiana, for Tampico, Mexico, with a cargo of cotton when she was captured and destroyed in the Gulf of Mexico off the coast of Texas by the armed screw steamer USS Antona (United States Navy).
Verwachting	Netherlands	The ship departed from Newcastle upon Tyne, Northumberland, United Kingdom for Harlingen, Friesland. No further trace, presumed foundered with the loss of all hands.
Weardale	United Kingdom	The brig was driven ashore at North Point, Maryland. She was on a voyage from the Pedro Keys to Baltimore, Maryland.

== 27 November ==
List of shipwrecks: 27 November 1863
Ship	State	Description
Breeze	(United Kingdom of Great Britain and Ireland) Saint Kitts	The drogher was abandoned off Saint Kitts.
Friends	United Kingdom	The derelict barque drove ashore at the Glosholm Lighthouse, Finland.
Princess Beatrice	United Kingdom	The ship ran aground on the Pluckington Bank, in the Irish Sea off the coast of Lancashire. She was on a voyage from Liverpool, Lancashire to Melbourne, Victoria. She was refloated and put back to Liverpool in a leaky condition.
Theophilus	United Kingdom	The brig was wrecked on the Bondicar Rocks, on the coast of Northumberland. Her five crew were rescued by the Warkworth Lifeboat. She was on a voyage from the River Tyne to Aberdeen.

== 28 November ==
List of shipwrecks: 28 November 1863
Ship	State	Description
Alert	United Kingdom	The steamship ran aground off North Somercotes, Lincolnshire. She was on a voyage from Rotterdam, South Holland, Netherland to "Nikrog". She was refloated the next day and taken in to Hull, Yorkshire.
Anne Elizabeth	Norway	The ship was abandoned in the Baltic Sea between Hiiumaa and the Packerort Lighthouse, Russia. Her crew were rescued. She was on a voyage from Saint Petersburg, Russia to Dundee, Forfarshire, United Kingdom.
Aristide Le Juste	France	The ship was driven ashore in Thorness Bay. She was on a voyage from Lannion, Côtes-du-Nord to Portsmouth, Hampshire, United Kingdom. She was refloated and completed her voyage.
Eva	United Kingdom	The steamship foundered in the Atlantic Ocean. All on board were rescued. She was on a voyage from Colón, Cuba to Liverpool, Lancashire.
Heart of Oak	United Kingdom	The sloop ran aground in the Menai Strait and sank. Her crew were rescued. She was on a voyage from Garston, Lancashire to Portmadoc, Caernarfonshire.

== 29 November ==
List of shipwrecks: 29 November 1863
Ship	State	Description
Amelia	United Kingdom	The ship was abandoned in the Atlantic Ocean Her crew were rescued by the full-rigged ship Atilla (United States). Amelia was on a voyage from New York, United States to London.
Anna Elizabeth	Norway	The ship was driven ashore and wrecked on Osmussaar, Russia. She was on a voyage from Saint Petersburg, Russia to Dundee, Forfarshire, United Kingdom.
Antelope	China	The steamship ran aground upstream of Nankin. She was on a voyage from Shanghai to Ningpo. She suffered a boiler explosion during attempts to refloat her and was wrecked with the loss of 21 of her crew and 20 troops.
Bulwark	United Kingdom	The ship was driven ashore at Lamlash, Isle of Arran. She was on a voyage from Ardrossan, Ayrshire to Blyth, Northumberland. She broke up in a gale on 1 December.
Friends	United Kingdom	The ship was wrecked on "Kalbodan". Her crew were rescued.
Garonne	Netherlands	The ship departed from Newcastle upon Tyne, Northumberland for Harlingen, Friesland. No further trace, presumed foundered with the loss of all hands.
Harriet	United Kingdom	The ship passed through The Downs whilst on a voyage from Sunderland, County Durham to Kurrachee, India. No further trace, presumed foundered with the loss of all hands.
Hyderaspes	United Kingdom	The steamship ran aground on the Girdler Sand, off the Kent coast. She was on a voyage from London to the Cape of Good Hope Cape Colony, Madras and Calcutta, India. She was refloated.
Indian Chief	United Kingdom	The barque ran aground on Preston Island, Fife. She was on a voyage from Grangemouth, Stirlingshire to Sunderland, County Durham. She was further driven ashore on 8 December but was refloated on 11 December and found to be severely damaged.

== 30 November ==
List of shipwrecks: 30 November 1863
Ship	State	Description
Dart	United Kingdom	The ship was driven ashore at Staithes, Yorkshire.
Eliza Bowen	United Kingdom	The ship foundered off Ailsa Craig, in the Firth of Clyde. Her crew were rescued. She was on a voyage from Liverpool, Lancashire to Nantes, Loire-Inférieure, France.
Glenmessen	United Kingdom	The ship ran aground at Bombay, India. She was on a voyage from Kurrachee to Bombay. She was refloated and taken in to Bombay.
Jules Auguste	France	The ship departed from Saint-Nazaire, Loire-Inférieure for Dublin, United Kingdom. No further trace, presumed foundered with the loss of all hands.

== Unknown date ==
List of shipwrecks: Unknown date in November 1863
Ship	State	Description
Admiral	United Kingdom	The ship was driven ashore in the North East Bay of Sweden before 6 November. She was on a voyage from Grangemouth, Stirlingshire to Danzig. She was refloated and taken in to "Kanso" in a leaky condition.
Albert	United Kingdom	The ship was wrecked off "Osterholmen". She was on a voyage from London to Söderhamn, Sweden.
Albion	United Kingdom	The ship was abandoned at sea. She was on a voyage from Vyborg, Grand Duchy of Finland to Hull, Yorkshire.
Albion	United Kingdom	The steamship was driven ashore. She was on a voyage from Hull to Pillau, Prussia. She was later refloated with assistance.
Alice Webb	Flag unknown	American Civil War, Union blockade: Carrying assorted cargo, the schooner was beached inside Bogue Inlet on or before 3 November.
Amicitia	Danzig	The ship was driven ashore near Hela, Prussia. She was on a voyage from Danzig to Brake, Kingdom of Hanover.
Anna	United Kingdom	The ship sank "on Kjdeltsund". She was on a voyage from Hull to Fårø, Sweden.
Anna Heyers	United Kingdom	The ship was wrecked near Lemvig, Denmark.
Ann and Elizabeth	United Kingdom	The collier departed from the River Tyne for London in late November. No further trace, presumed foundered with the loss of all hands.
Anne	United Kingdom	The ship was wrecked at "Wadervarne". She was on a voyage from Newcastle upon Tyne, Northumberland to Aalborg, Denmark.
Argo	Netherlands	The ship was driven ashore and wrecked at "Kaaseberga". She was on a voyage from Narva, Russia to Amsterdam, North Holland.
Brodricks	United Kingdom	The collier departed from the River Tyne for London in late November. No further trace, presumed foundered with the loss of all hands.
Caroline	United States	The ship was abandoned in the Baltic Sea before 7 November. She was on a voyage from Kronstadt, Russia to New York. She was subsequently taken in to the Aspö Islands, Grand Duchy of Finland.
Cid	Hamburg	The ship was wrecked at the mouth of the Elbe. She was on a voyage from Rio de Janeiro, Brazil to Altona.
Duchess of Gloucester	United Kingdom	The ship was towed in to Greenock, Renfrewshire in a derelict condition before 12 November. She had been on a voyage from Bangor, Caernarfonshire to Coleraine, County Antrim.
Duodecimus	United Kingdom	The brig was wrecked on Wallis Point, Malta. She was on a voyage from Cardiff, Glamorgan to Malta.
Elizabeth and Mary	United Kingdom	The schooner was wrecked on the Tille, in the North Sea before 25 November. Her crew survived. She was on a voyage from Rotterdam, South Holland, Netherlands to "Heppen".
Elizabeth Maria	Belgium	The ship was driven ashore near Trieste. She was on a voyage from Antwerp to Trieste.
Elwing	United Kingdom	The ship was wrecked near Gothenburg, Sweden. She was on a voyage from Hull to Stettin.
Emma Colvin	United Kingdom	The ship was wrecked on the coast of New Caledonia before 1 December.
Esther	United Kingdom	The collier departed from the River Tyne for London in late November. No further trace, presumed foundered with the loss of all hands.
Flint Castle	United Kingdom	The ship was driven onto the Green Island Rocks, in Cloughy Bay.
Fortuna	Kingdom of Hanover	The ship foundered in the North Sea off Sylt, Duchy of Holstein on or before 22 November.
Four Brothers and Four Sisters	United Kingdom	The Yorkshire Billyboy was driven ashore at Shanklin, Isle of Wight.
Frederick Bunning	United Kingdom	The barque was abandoned in the Atlantic Ocean before 21 November.
George	United Kingdom	The ship was abandoned in the North Sea. Her crew were rescued. She was on a voyage from Schiedam, South Holland, Netherlands to Seaham, County Durham.
Georgina	United Kingdom	The ship was severely damaged by fire at Ardrossan, Ayrshire. She was on a voyage from the Clyde to Bahia, Brazil.
Golden Eagle	United Kingdom	The ship was wrecked off the mouth of the River Plate before 22 November. Her crew survived. She was on a voyage from Liverpool, Lancashire to Buenos Aires, Argentina.
Helen	United Kingdom	The ship was abandoned on the North Sea. She was on a voyage from Hartlepool to Altona.
Hermann	Flag unknown	The ship was lost near "Wingo", Sweden before 4 November.
Hero	Prussia	The ship was driven ashore near Helsingborg, Sweden. She was on a voyage from the River Tyne to Copenhagen, Denmark.
Hillechina	United Kingdom	The ship departed from Mandal, Norway for London. No further trace, presumed foundered with the loss of all hands.
Inverke	United Kingdom	The ship was abandoned off The Lizard, Cornwall.
Iris	United Kingdom	The ship was wrecked at "Wingo", Sweden before 6 November. She was on a voyage from Leith, Lothian to Oscarshamn, Sweden.
James	United Kingdom	The collier departed from the River Tyne in late November for London. No further trace, presumed foundered with the loss of all hands.
Jessie	United Kingdom	The ship was wrecked on the coast of Sweden.
Jeune Lucy	France	The ship was wrecked on the coast of Landes.
Johanna Matilda	Sweden	The ship was driven ashore on Klädesholmen. She was on a voyage from North Shields, Northumberland to Gothenburg.
Julia Chism	United Kingdom	The ship was abandoned in the North Sea. Her crew were rescued by John Shyres (United Kingdom).
Julia Clasia	Netherlands	The ship was abandoned in the Atlantic Ocean. Her crew were rescued by John Rhymas (United Kingdom). Julia Clasia was on a voyage from Amsterdam to Batavia, Netherlands East Indies.
Julius	United Kingdom	The schooner was abandoned in the North Sea before 10 November.
Kate	United Kingdom	The smack was driven ashore at Abersoch, Caernarfonshire. Her crew were rescued. She was on a voyage from Runcorn, Cheshire to Plymouth, Devon.
Konigen von Preussen	Prussia	The ship was driven ashore on Klädesholmen, Sweden before 3 November. She was on a voyage from North Shields to Königsberg.
Lady Mary	United Kingdom	The collier departed from the River Tyne for London in late November. No further trace, presumed foundered with the loss of all hands.
Laurel	United States	The brig was wrecked at Lamartine, Province of Canada, British North America before 14 November.
Ludwig	Sweden	The ship ran aground near Gothenburg. She was on a voyage from Gothenburg to Bombay, India.
Maria	France	The ship was lost near Carmen. She was on a voyage from Veracruz to Carmen.
Maria Finnige	Belgium	The ship was driven ashore and wrecked at Constantinople, Ottoman Empire. She was on a voyage from "Riga" to Ghent, East Flanders.
Mary Muncaster	United Kingdom	The barque departed from the River Tyne for Spain in late November. Presumed foundered in the North Sea with the loss of all fifteen crew. Wreckage from the ship washed up at Norderney, Kingdom of Hanover in early December.
Meteor	UKGBI	The ship was driven ashore. She was on a voyage from Danzig to Liverpool. She was on a voyage from Korsør, Denmark to Bergen, Norway. She was and refloated taken in to Helsingør, Denmark, where she arrived on 20 November in a leaky condition.
Mimosa	United Kingdom	The steamship was wrecked near "Bega".
Nelson	United Kingdom	The ship was wrecked on Amrum. She was on a voyage from Hartlepool to Hamburg.
Norman	United States	American Civil War: After being captured by Confederate forces on the coast of Florida at the mouth of the Perdido River, the schooner was run aground and burned by her Confederate prize crew to prevent her recapture by the approaching screw steamer USS Bermuda (United States Navy).
Richard Pearse	United Kingdom	The schooner foundered in the English Channel off the coast of Devon. All eight people on board survived. She was on a voyage from Portland, Dorset to Dublin.
Robert Peel	United Kingdom	The ship was driven ashore at Narva, Russia.
Salazes	France	The barque collided with the steamship John Bright (United Kingdom) and sank. Her crew were rescued.
Silver Wave	United States	The 245-ton sternwheel paddle steamer sank in the Mississippi River at Columbus, Kentucky.
Spray	United Kingdom	The collier departed from the River Tyne for London in late November. No further trace, presumed foundered with the loss of all hands.
Suomi	(Russian Empire) Russia	The ship was taken in to Risør, Norway in a derelict condition.
Thomas	(United Kingdom of Great Britain and Ireland) British North America	The ship was abandoned in the Atlantic Ocean before 29 November.
Thomas Wright	United Kingdom	The ship was wrecked at Saint Domingo. She was on a voyage from Halifax, Nova Scotia, British North America to Aux Cayes, Haiti.
Wanderer	United Kingdom	The brigantine foundered in the Atlantic Ocean before 12 November. Her crew were rescued by Wild Horse (United Kingdom).
William Broderick	United Kingdom	The ship was lost in the Baltic Sea. Her crew survived.
