= Contention =

Contention or contentious may refer to:

- Contention (telecommunications), a media access method to share a broadcast medium
- Contention, Oregon, U.S., later known as Twickenham
- Contention City, Arizona, U.S., a ghost town
- Bus contention, an undesirable state in computer design
- FV4401 Contentious, a prototype British tank destroyer
- Resource contention, in computer science, a conflict over access to a shared resource

== See also ==
- Argument
- Contest (disambiguation)
- Controversy
- Debate
- Strife (disambiguation)
- Struggle (disambiguation)
