= Open class =

Open class may refer to:

- Open class (linguistics), a word class readily accepting new items
- Open (sport)
  - Open class (track and field), an event classification
  - Open 60 Class, a type of monohull sailboat
  - FAI Open Class, a glider competition class with unlimited wingspan
- Open class (computer programming), the ability to extend already-defined classes
- IBM Open Class (IOC), a C++ class library
- Open class system, a state of society
