= Contested Memories =

2003 book

- Editor: Joshua D. Zimmerman
- Language: English
- Subject: The Holocaust in Poland
- Publisher: Rutgers University Press
- Publication date: 2003
- Publication place: United States
- Media type: Print
- ISBN: 978-0-8135-3158-8
- Dewey Decimal: 940.53/18/0943
- LC Class: D804.3 .C69

Contested Memories: Poles and Jews During the Holocaust and Its Aftermath is a 2003 book discussing the Holocaust in Poland. Contributors include Zvi Gitelman, Nechama Tec, Israel Gutman, Henry Abramson, Samuel Kassow, Dariusz Stola, David Engel, Stanisław Krajewski, Feliks Tych, Gunnar S. Paulsson, and Michael C. Steinlauf. It was edited by Joshua D. Zimmerman.

The book was described by the publisher as "the first attempt since the fall of Communism to reassess the existing historiography of Polish–Jewish relations just before, during, and after the Second World War".
