= Certamen =

Certamen, Latin for competition, may refer to:

- Certamen Homeri et Hesiodi, a Greek narrative of an imagined poetical agon between Homer and Hesiod
- Certamen (quiz bowl), a competition with classics-themed questions
- CS Certamen, an Italian cable ship, formerly CCGS John Cabot (1965)

== See also ==
- Competition (disambiguation)
- Agon
