= Sponsored mobility =

Sponsored mobility refers to a system of social mobility where elite individuals in society select (either directly or through agents) recruits to induct into high status groups. This norm functions in to contest mobility, in which everyone is seen as having equal opportunity to attain high status.

The definitive research article on the subject was published in 1960 by Ralph H. Turner. Turner compared the American and British systems of secondary education and found the two to be markedly different. He links the idea of sponsored mobility with the British system.

In a system of sponsored mobility, elite status is not earned, but given on the basis of some objective criterion and cannot be taken. Individuals must be sponsored by one or more members already in the elite circle in order to gain access. Those who are already members judge potential entrants on the extent to which they possess characteristics they wish to see in their future peers.

Sponsored mobility favors a much greater degree of social control than contest mobility. Individual effort means nothing; only qualities that grant sponsorship matter. In this system, credentials exist not to identify elite members to outsiders, but only to each other. These are things that only the elite are trained to recognize (i.e. Discrimination in cultural tastes) therefore making it difficult for interlopers to gain access to membership. One instance where a system of sponsored mobility may develop into a contest mobility scenario is when there is no one dominant elite. Without a monopoly, elites must compete amongst themselves because no one group can control the recruitment process.

In comparing contest mobility with sponsored mobility, Deborah Abowitz surveyed American college students and examined effects of family class position, income, gender, and other status variables in determining attitudes about the norm that exists in the U.S.

Abowitz studied college students instead of secondary students precisely because, “What brings college students' beliefs into question…is the effect of radical critiques of the system that they are often exposed to in college -- in courses which focus not on the rhetoric of an open class system but on evidence of social reproduction and the rising levels of inequality in wealth and income among Americans today.”

Her study concluded that students do in fact subscribe to the achievement ideology enforced by contest mobility, and reject the sponsored mobility notion that background is a more important determinant of future status than effort.
