= Joshua D. Zimmerman =

American historian

Joshua D. Zimmerman (born 1966) holds the Eli and Diana Zborowski Professorial Chair in Holocaust Studies and East European Jewish History at Yeshiva University. He is the author or editor of several works about the Holocaust, including Contested Memories. Poles and Jews during the Holocaust and Its Aftermath (2003) and The Polish Underground and the Jews, 1939–1945 (2015).

== Education and career ==
Zimmerman graduated from the University of California, Santa Cruz, in 1989 with a BA in history. He was awarded an MA in history from the University of California, Los Angeles, in 1993 and a PhD in comparative history from Brandeis University in February 1998. He is proficient in Yiddish, Polish, Hebrew, Russian, and French. In 2004 he was appointed an associate professor of history at Yeshiva University in New York City.

== Work ==
Contested Memories (2003), a volume Zimmerman edited, was described by the publisher as "the first attempt since the fall of Communism to reassess the existing historiography of Polish-Jewish relations just before, during, and after the Second World War". Contributors included Zvi Gitelman, Nechama Tec, Israel Gutman, Henry Abramson, Samuel Kassow, Dariusz Stola, David Engel, Stanisław Krajewski, Feliks Tych, Gunnar S. Paulsson, and Michael C. Steinlauf.

His 2005 book, The Jews of Italy under Fascist and Nazi Rule, 1922–1945, was reviewed by Davide Rodogno, who wrote that the book is "refreshing and certainly worth reading", with some chapters being "outstanding", though he noted that the book would benefit from more discussion of the "myth of the benevolence of the Fascist regime", as well as of the "lack of academic interest in Italian anti-Semitism before the 1980s".

His 2015 book, The Polish Underground and the Jews, 1939–1945, received a number of overall positive reviews. In Yad Vashem Studies, Antony Polonsky praised the book as a "fair and dispassionate study" which seeks to "reach a conclusion on the actual behavior of the AK [Poland's Home Army]". Theodore R. Weeks, of Southern Illinois University, Carbondale, writes in The Polish Review: "The real achievement of Zimmerman's book is to present the light and shadow in the perspective of these difficult years, to note specific facts and trends, and to avoid overly broad generalizations."

== Books ==
- (2003), ed. Contested Memories: Poles and Jews during the Holocaust and its Aftermath. New Brunswick and London: Rutgers University Press. ISBN 978-0-8135-3158-8.
- (2004). Poles, Jews and the Politics of Nationality: the Bund and the Polish Socialist Party in Late Tsarist Russia, 1892–1914. Madison: The University of Wisconsin Press.
- (2005), ed. The Jews of Italy under Fascist and Nazi Rule, 1922–1945. Cambridge: Cambridge University Press.
- (2015). The Polish Underground and the Jews, 1939–1945. Cambridge and New York: Cambridge University Press. ISBN 9781107014268.
- (2022). Jozef Pilsudski: Founding Father of Modern Poland. Harvard University Press.
