= Hong Wah Kues =

American professional basketball team

The Hong Wah Kues (Chinese: 宏華僑 or 弘華僑) were a San Francisco-based all Chinese American professional basketball team that participated in the barnstorming circuits during the late 1930s. They were also the first Chinese professional team. Started in 1939 with six players, the Hong Wah Kues became known for their speed and quick passing. Contemporaries of the Harlem Globetrotters, the Hong Wah Kues made inroads into the world of basketball before disbanding with the start of World War II. Playing only two seasons due to the disruption of war, the Hong Wah Kues drew players and fans from the Chinatown community. Other barnstormers included the New York Renaissance, Toledo Brown Bombers, Cleveland-Rosenbloom Celtics, Missouri-based Olson’s Terrible Swedes, South Philadelphia Hebrew Association, and Indianapolis Kautskys. The characters representing Hong Wah Kue, which according to several accounts means "Brave (Great) Chinese Warriors" in Cantonese. In the transliteration, the 僑 suggests "compatriots" more so than "warriors." Consistency in use of "kue" also indicates direction towards the same character, as opposed to others like 過, which mean passing over.

== Genesis ==
With the growing popularity of sports in America during the 1920s, basketball spread quickly to major urban centers like SF. The Great Depression a decade later further cemented sport's role in American society because, at the time, few had significant disposable income. Sports were a cheap form of entertainment and further contributed to their expansion in American society. Occupying much of the North American consciousness at the time, sports helped provide opportunities for liberation as well as social reproduction. The idea to form an all-Chinese men's team came from accountant James W. Porter. Porter held tryouts at the Chinese Playground for the first ever Chinese professional team. The first team consisted of Fred Ming Gok, Fred Hong Wong, Albert Lee, George Lee, Robert "Doggie" Lum and Chauncey Yip. Members of the second season were Albert Lee, George Lee, Lum, Faye Lee, Douglas Quan and Arnold Lim. Partly out of a desire to find more favorable conditions, the players joined up and left to see the world outside Chinatown after high school. During high school, it's likely they played pick up games with or knew members of the Mei Wahs through the shared site of the Chinese Playground.

== Playing style ==
At their tallest, the Hong Wah Kues stood at 5'11". The shortest was only 5'3". Mostly single, working class and second-generation immigrants, the players faced dead end jobs because of the prevalent discrimination in those days. However, the basketball court became an arena where there was opportunity to find an equalizer. While facing limited socio-economic possibilities, each of the Hong Wah Kues had extensive experience in basketball; many had won awards on their Chinese club teams and high school teams. For example, Gok, who stood 5'11", participated in several sports, was among the first Chinese lettermen at Galileo High School and earned all-city honors. Another, Fred Hong Wong, was a three sport letterman in basketball, soccer and track. Wong later went on to win the 1948 SF Golden Gloves for lightweight division. With their athletic background, the Hong Wah Kues came together and utilized a fast up-tempo game with quick passes to their advantage. In the context of the Hong Wah Kues, basketball provided a means to get out and see America. From the audience's perspective, the "Oriental invaders" who spoke perfect English could be seen as a racially progressive force.

== On the road ==
Players traveled November through March. Games took place once every night and twice on Sundays. Out of 80 games in 100 days of their first season, the Hong Wah Kues amassed a winning percentage of 70 percent. Life on the road was hard; players were known to pile into a car immediately following a game because they had get to the next town. Seven crammed into one car; three in the front, three in the back and one riding hassock. Players earned $135 each month but had to cover room, board, food and shoes. The team provided a car, a ball and one uniform. At this time, Abe Saperstein, owner of the Harlem Globetrotters, served as agent for the Hong Wah Kues. He would arrange their games and make sure the ticket fees were paid. The first thing the Hong Wah Kues did when arriving at a new location was scout any available Chinese restaurants. If they were on a double bill with the Globetrotters, the African American trotters would ask them where they were going to eat and if it was a Chinese restaurant, they went with the Hong Wah Kues because they knew they wouldn't be turned away there. There were, as one might expect, many discriminatory laws back then. In Coeur D'Alene, Idaho, it was illegal for Chinese to work there. So the city council met a few days before the game, repealed the law for a couple of days, and then re-enacted it after the Hong Wah Kues left town.

== Media portrayals ==
In 1998, KPIX-TV reporter Rick Quan earned an Emmy Award and a Radio-Television News Directors Association award for his documentary on the Hong Wah Kues. They have also been featured in museum exhibits. During their active years, the Hong Wah Kues' experience with racism varied. In some towns, they found African Americans received the brunt of the abuse. Fans were known to cheer on the team with phrases like "Go, Chinky!" Usage of the racial slur took on different meanings. Whereas typically used in a derogatory manner, cheering fans seemed to just use the term as a way of caricaturing the Asian athletes. This was in no small part due to the fact ad campaigns for the Hong Wah Kues tended to focus on messages like "invaders," "Oriental rug cutters," "sing song language" and similar constructions of their identity and masculinity; the players were required to speak Cantonese on the court. Under the theory of a matrix of domination, being of lower class origins and Chinese played a role in placing these athletes in positions of subjugation and objectification. At the same time, a serious free agency formed as the team co-opted heretofore harmful language into slogans for mass entertainment, thereby creating a contested terrain. Readers should keep in mind that scholars regard race as a social construction.
