= Joshua Zimmerman =

Joshua Zimmerman may refer to:

- Joshua D. Zimmerman (born 1966), professor of history at Yeshiva University
- Joshua Soule Zimmerman (1874–1962), American lawyer, politician and orchardist
- Joshua Zimmerman (footballer) (born 2001), Curaçaoan footballer
