= Strife =

Strife may refer to:

== Mythology ==
- Eris (mythology), in Greek mythology the goddess of discord, whose name means 'strife'
- Bellona (goddess), Roman counterpart of Eris, and a war goddess
- Enyalius, a son of Eris and god of strife
- Tano Akora, god of war, thunder and strife in the Akom religion. However, he protects others from strife and death

== Fiction and entertainment ==
- Strife (play), a play by John Galsworthy, first produced in 1909
- Strife (1996 video game), a 1996 video game
- Strife (2015 video game), a 2015 video game
- Cloud Strife, the protagonist in the Final Fantasy VII game
- Strife (TV series), a 2023 TV series
- Strife (Trading Card Game), a Trading Card Game in development since 2024.

== Music ==
- Strife (band), an American hardcore band
- "Strife" (song), by Trivium, 2013

== See also ==
- Stryfe, a Marvel Comics supervillain, particularly of the X-Men and related teams
- Strafe (disambiguation)
