= Glosholm Lighthouse =

Lighthouse in Finland

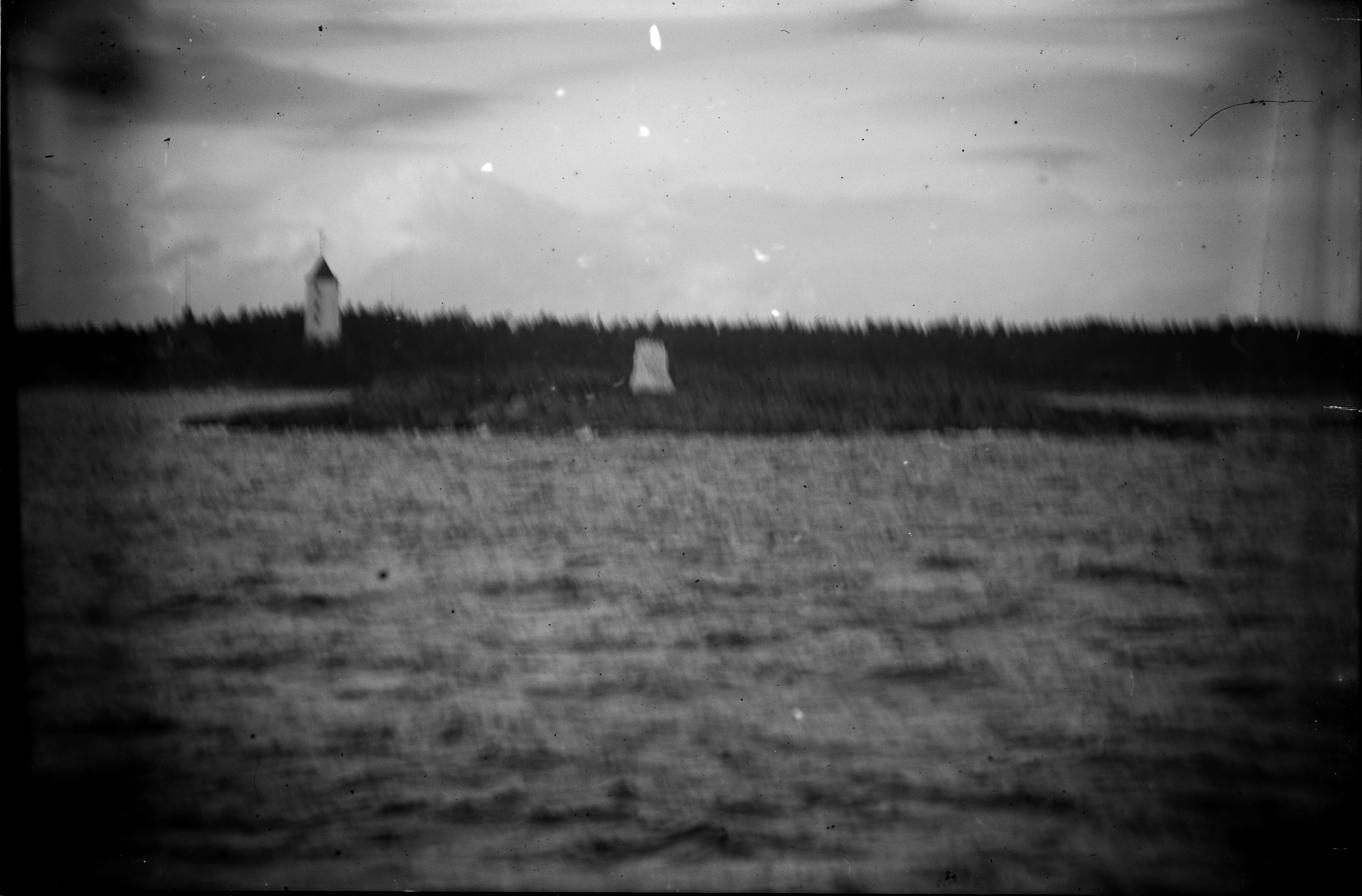
- Location: Porvoo, Finland
- Coordinates: 60°11′11.7″N 25°50′09.0″E

Tower
- Constructed: 1832
- Construction: stone tower
- Height: 9 metres (30 ft) high remains of the lighthouse

Light
- First lit: 15 September 1835
- Deactivated: 1863

The Glosholm Lighthouse (later Glosholm daymark) was a lighthouse on a southern tip of the Glosholm Island in the Pellinge archipelago in the Gulf of Finland, outside of Porvoo. With increasing sea traffic in the area, the lighthouse was constructed during the years 1832–1835. It served from 1835 to 1863, when it was replaced by the Söderskär Lighthouse. The structure served as a daymark until 1940, when it was blown up.

== Planning and building ==
When the lighthouse was being planned for the area, there were conflicting views on its location. Gustaf Brodd, then head of the Finnish pilot and lighthouse administration, wanted the lighthouse to be built on Glosholm, but the head of the Russian Lighthouse Administration wanted a more southerly location on Söderskär. In 1826, Tsar Nicholas I ordered the lighthouse to be built on Glosholm.

The tower of the lighthouse was made of bricks, it was 16.3 metres high, and it was four storeys high and had a diameter of 8.9 metres. An octagonal lighting structures were placed on this structure. A house for the staff of four was also built at the same time. The light of the lighthouse was lit for the first time on 15 September 1835.

== The Söderskär Lighthouse is built ==
The location of the Glosholm Lighthouse was not the best possible from the point of view of maritime traffic, and it was considered that the poor position contributed to some of the shipwrecks in the area. Thus, when the Söderskär Lighthouse had been built, the Glosholm Lighthouse lights were turned off, and from then on it functioned as a daymark. The top structure with the lighting devices were torn down, and an octagonal iron roof was built in its stead, with a tapering point at the top. On top of this there was a cross with a height of 6.1 metres, and a barrel placed crosswise on top of the cross.

== Destruction during the Winter War ==
During the Winter War, the Glosholm daymark was ordered to be destroyed, as it was thought that the enemy bombers could use it for navigation. The tower was blown up on 14 March 1940, i.e. a day after the war ended. The news of the end of the war did not reach the daymark until some time later. A five metre tall structure remained standing, and during the Continuation War it was used for fire control.

== Model for the Moomin House ==
Author Tove Jansson used the Glosholm daymark as the model for her Moominhouse. According to some sources, Jansson spent some of her childhood summers in the area. More reliable is the information that she later spent the summers for 30 years on the Klovaharun Island, ca. 3 km south-west of Glosholm. By the time the first Moomin book came out in 1945, the daymark had already been blown up, but memories of it still lingered.

== Opening up for the public ==
According to Helsingin Sanomat (25 July 27, 2015), the coast guard will be moving away from Glosholm, and the Finnish Administration of Forests and the Uusimaa Centre for Economic Development, Transport and the Environment are planning to make Glosholm a tourist destination.

== See also ==
- List of lighthouses and lightvessels in Finland

== Further information ==
- Laurell, Seppo (1999). Suomen majakat [‘The lighthouses of Finland’]. Jyväskylä: Merenkulkulaitos. p. 283. ISBN 952-5180-21-2.
