= The Competition =

The Competition may refer to:

- The Competition (1980 film), a 1980 film starring Richard Dreyfuss
- The Competition (2018 film), a 2018 film starring Thora Birch
- "The Competition" (Dilbert), a 1999 television episode
- "The Competition" (The Golden Girls), a 1985 television episode
- "The Competition" (Sabrina the Teenage Witch), a 2002 television episode

== See also ==
- Competition (disambiguation)
