= Contest mobility =

Contest mobility refers to system of social mobility in which all individuals are seen as participants in a race where elite status is the end goal and the contest is an open one. The idea is also sometimes referred to as tournament mobility. This serves in opposition to sponsored mobility, in which controlled selection is prevalent.

The definitive research article on the subject was published in 1960 by Ralph H. Turner. Turner compared the American and British systems of secondary education and found the two to be markedly different. He identifies the American system as one in which contest mobility is the norm.

In a system of contest mobility, equal footing among individuals is assumed as a given. Achievement is attributed directly to the effort put in by each contestant. Skill is not as valued as enterprise or perseverance; a person of average intelligence who works hard is seen as more deserving of reward than someone who is the most intelligent and does not try. According to Turner, "the governing objective of contest mobility is to give elite status to those who earn it... Under the contest system society at large establishes and interprets the criteria of elite status."

These criteria are most commonly in the form of credentials, which are used by others to identify an individual's class. Examples of these can be material assets or skills.

Social control in a system of contest mobility is established by emphasizing a futuristic way of thinking and encouraging individuals to remember that they are competing for upward social mobility. In doing this, social norms are cultivated and emphasized as well. Also, elite control is perilous, because any individual can be displaced at any time.

Turner found the results of contest mobility in the United States secondary school system to be a generally elevated sense of aspiration among students, in relation to actual opportunities available. He points out that, "under contest mobility in the United States, education is valued as a means of getting ahead, but the contents of education are not highly valued in their own right." This results in an emphasis on keeping all individuals in the contest (at least until the final stages) and offering extra help to those who fall behind, rather than allowing those who grasp the content to move quickly ahead and apart from the rest.

Looking past education to the realm of the working world, job success has also been studied in terms of contest vs. sponsored mobility. In a study by Cable and Murray on mobility in the workplace, contest mobility is shown to emphasize equity and productivity, and individuals who show originality and innovation are rewarded.

Contest mobility is often tied to the idea of the American Dream, portrayed by figures such as Horatio Alger, who epitomize the notion that with hard work anything is possible. In comparing contest mobility with sponsored mobility, Deborah Abowitz surveyed American college students and examined effects of family class position, income, gender, and other status variables in determining attitudes about the norm that exists in the U.S.

Abowitz studied college students instead of secondary students precisely because, "What brings college students' beliefs into question...is the effect of radical critiques of the system that they are often exposed to in college -- in courses which focus not on the rhetoric of an open class system but on evidence of social reproduction and the rising levels of inequality in wealth and income among Americans today."

Despite this point, the study concluded that college students do in fact believe in the American Dream and achievement ideology that is embodied in a system of contest mobility. Students were shown to strongly support the statement that "One can live well in America" and also disagreed that family background was the most important factor in determining mobility.
