= The Polish Underground and the Jews, 1939–1945 =

2015 non-fiction book by Joshua D. Zimmerman

- First edition
- Author: Joshua D. Zimmerman
- Language: English
- Subject: Polish-Jewish history, Polish resistance in WWII
- Publisher: Cambridge University Press
- Publication date: 2015
- Publication place: United States
- Pages: 474
- ISBN: 1107014263

The Polish Underground and the Jews, 1939–1945 is a book by American historian Joshua D. Zimmerman, published in 2015 by Cambridge University Press, discussing relations between Poland's Jewish population and the Polish resistance in World War II. Zimmerman argues that polarized narratives, one picturing the Polish underground as antisemitic and murderous toward Jews and the other hand as heroically rescuing them, are oversimplified; in fact, different segments and members of the Home Army behaved in diverse ways. The book has received mostly-positive reviews for its evenhanded treatment of a contentious subject matter.

== Contents ==
Researching the book took Joshua Zimmerman nine years. He lived for a year in Poland, interviewed witnesses (Jewish survivors as well as Home Army members), and examined archives in the United Kingdom and Israel. Zimmerman states that his intent was to present evidence without offering a verdict.

The book falls into two parts. The first and shorter part covers prewar background, the initial German and Soviet occupations of Poland, and the early Polish resistance until 1941. The second part covers the remainder of the war, which saw the Polish resistance grow in strength, as well as the main stages of the Holocaust in Poland. The book has separate chapters on Polish rescue of Jews and on incidents of the killing of Jews by the Polish resistance.

== Reception ==
Antony Polonsky, writing in 2015 in Yad Vashem Studies, praised the book as a "fair and dispassionate study" that seeks to "reach a conclusion on the actual behavior of the AK [Home Army]". Marisa Fox-Bevilacqua, reviewing the book that year for Haaretz, concluded by citing the Polish journalist Konstanty Gebert, who hoped the book would be translated into Polish and wrote, "The merit of the book is to show how complex the attitudes of the underground towards Jews were."

Wojtek Rappak, reviewing the book in 2016 for the Israel Journal of Foreign Affairs, called the book important and excellent and observed that Zimmerman's goal was "to challenge what he takes to be a long-established and overwhelmingly negative view of the Polish Underground, especially among 'professional Jewish historians'", while also challenging Polish historiography which presents the Underground as a "heroic and noble resistance movement," with no tolerance allowed for criticism of the Underground.

Michael Meng, in 2016 in The American Historical Review, wrote that the book tackles a "difficult and sensitive topic" and that the author "made a significant contribution to the historiography of Polish-Jewish relations."

That same year, Michael Berenbaum, in a review for Holocaust and Genocide Studies, wrote that the book is "timely... useful... and... good". He noted that it will upset both "Polish apologist historians" and Jewish historians "who seek simple answers". He also cautioned against selective reading of the book, as it has separate sections on rescue of Jews by the Poles and on Polish collaboration during World War II.

Eva Plach, reviewing the book for the Slavic Review, also in 2016, wrote that it is "a book richly deserving of praise" and commented that Zimmerman's account discussed both examples of how, on occasion, some elements of the Polish Underground killed Jews and examples of how other elements provided aid to Jews, which "reminds us... why we cannot treat the Polish Underground as a homogeneous entity."

A 2016 review by Dariusz Libionka in the Polish-language Zagłada Żydów. Studia i Materiały (Holocaust Studies and Materials) journal was more critical. Libionka noted that Zimmerman's literature review on the subject matter was lacking, particularly for engaging with the extensive body of Polish literature on the subject and using content from Polish archives. He concluded that the book is disappointing for experts but may be valuable for newcomers to the field, particularly those who cannot read Polish, as the subject matter discussed in the book had been inadequately discussed in English literature. The review provoked an exchange of letters in that journal between Zimmerman and Libionka.

According to Andrzej Żbikowski, Zimmerman is less critical of the Polish underground than the Polish historian Adam Puławski, who has written multiple books on the same subject. For example, while Zimmerman praises the bulletin published by the Home Army, Puławski argues that the bulletin was of little importance at the time. In addition, according to Żbikowski, Zimmerman's book is written with a foreign reader in mind and therefore spends considerable space on background information. He also states that sometimes Zimmerman goes too far in attempting to avoid offending supporters of the Polish Underground State.

Theodore R. Weeks, writing in 2018 in The Polish Review, called the book "a remarkably fair, objective and scholarly monograph" in a controversial topic area. Jadwiga Biskupska, writing the same year in H-Net, called the book "essential reading for modern Polish history and the Holocaust" and observed that it should be seen as a valuable contribution not only to those topics but also the literature on World War II resistance movements, particularly on Poland's Home Army.

Robert Blobaum wrote in his review that Zimmerman does not make enough of an effort to answer the questions he raises:

However much new information Zimmerman has added to the balance sheet, one ultimately has to ask and answer the question: Do the Home Army’s accounts really balance or do they contain a substantial moral deficit? And, more significantly, where does the wartime record fit into the larger downward spiral of Polish-Jewish relations in the first half of the twentieth century?
