= Contested ideological terrain =

Sociology concept

In sociology, contested ideological terrain is a theoretical framework that looks at sport as a cultural practice that reinforces both the certain existing power dynamics and the agency of human groups and individuals. Instead of looking at sport as a purely positive force, where individuals and groups of people can use sport as a means of achieving social mobility and success, or as a cultural practice that is solely detrimental, where sport reinforces the social inequalities in our world, this framework looks at sport as something that encompasses both.

According to Douglass Hartmann: "Sport is a 'double-edged sword' not just a place (or variable) whereby racial interests and meanings are either inhibited or advanced but rather a site where racial formations are constantly—and very publicly—struggled on and over."

The contested terrain framework focuses on looking at the interplay between structural organizations (like, businesses, the media, and the government), the individuals who are involved in sports (the individual players, coaches, and fans), and the common ideologies that revolve around sport. By looking at these three levels, sport can be seen as a site where racial meanings and social inequalities are constantly being contested. According to Kathleen Yep: "These multiple and sometimes competing functions [of sport] shift us away from analyzing social reproduction and domination only, and allow us to examine the interplay between domination and agency."

This framework also looks at the interplay between oppression and resistance, where both oppression and resistance exist simultaneously in the realm of sports. Michael Messner has showcased this aspect of this framework in his article, "Sports and Male Domination: The Female Athlete as Contested Ideological Terrain".

== See also ==
- Gender
- Mei Wahs
- Power (social and political)
