= Contestant =

Contestant may refer to:

- Participant in a contest
- The Contestant (2007 film), Spanish comedy film
- The Contestant (2023 film), British documentary film
