= Söderskär Lighthouse =

Söderskär lighthouse Söderskär fyr
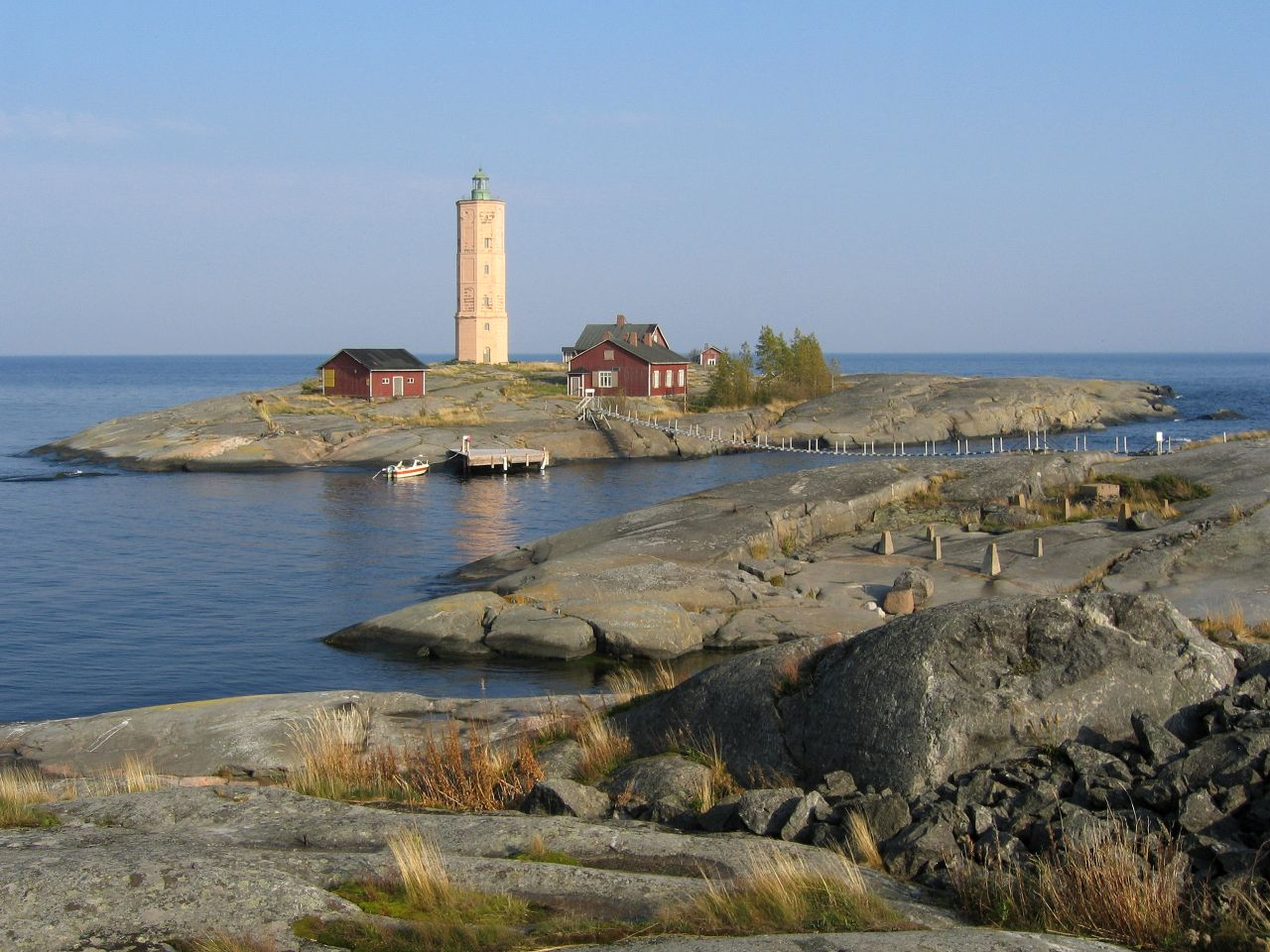
- Söderskär lighthouse and island in 2005
- Location: Söderskär, Porvoo, Finland
- Coordinates: 60°06′34″N 25°24′36″E

Tower
- Constructed: 1862
- Automated: 1957
- Height: 32.5 m (107 ft)
- Heritage: protected by the law on the protection of the architectural heritage in Finland

Light
- Deactivated: 1989
- Focal height: 40 m (130 ft)
- Characteristic: Exting

The Söderskär lighthouse (Finnish: Söderskärin majakka, Swedish: Söderskär fyr, South Skerry lighthouse) is a decommissioned 19th-century lighthouse in the outer Porvoo archipelago of the Gulf of Finland. It was built in 1862, replacing an earlier unilluminated daymark, automated in 1957, and decommissioned in 1989.

The lighthouse is situated on a small islet, known as Majakkasaari (lit. 'Lighthouse Island'). Connected to it by a footbridge is another islet, Luotsisaari ('Pilot Island'), where a pilot station was based since before the construction of the current lighthouse. Three lighthouse keepers, with their families, and on-duty pilots used to reside on the islets, until the lighthouse was automated.

The lighthouse was designed by architect Ernst Lohrmann. The tower is octagonal in shape, and comprises six storeys. The lighthouse is 32.5 metres (107 ft) tall, and constructed of granite up to 8.6 metres (28 ft) height, with brick-and-mortar above that. In the early years of the 20th century it was discovered that the tower swayed in strong wind, and was also leaning to one side; consequently, in 1914-1917 a steel and concrete 'girdle' was added to stabilise the structure.

The light source is 40 metres (130 ft) above mean sea level. The light is equipped with a Fresnel lens, and when commissioned, Söderskär was renowned for its exceptionally bright and long-range light.

The lighthouse itself is now privately owned, having been sold by the government in 2003. The building is protected by the Finnish Heritage Agency, meaning that no exterior or interior alterations are allowed, and the technical equipment may not be removed without permission.

Tove Jansson is said to have used Söderskär as a model when writing the lighthouse island of the book Moominpappa at Sea.

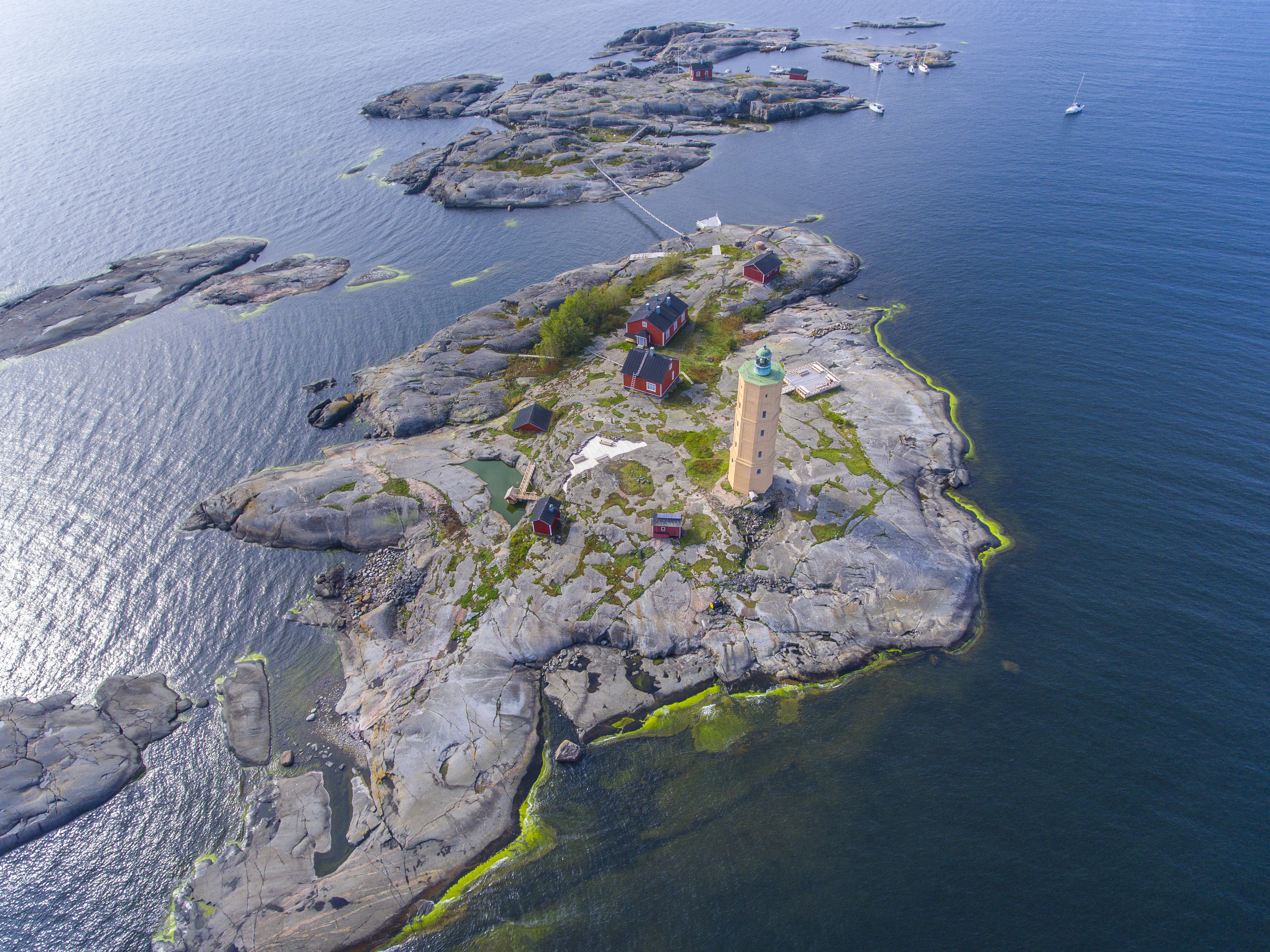
Aerial view of Majakkasaari, with Luotsisaari behind

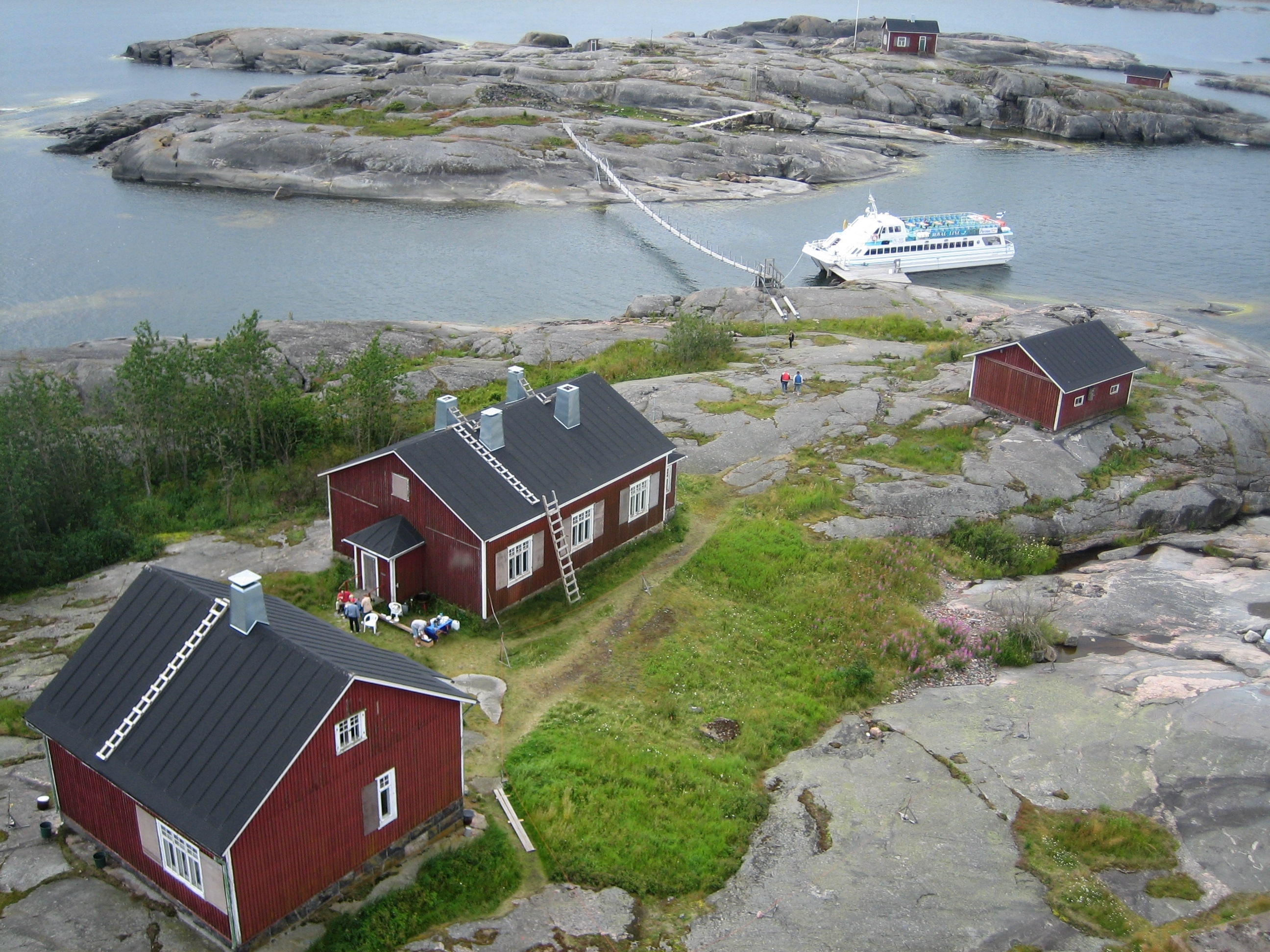
View from the top of the tower, showing the residential and service buildings
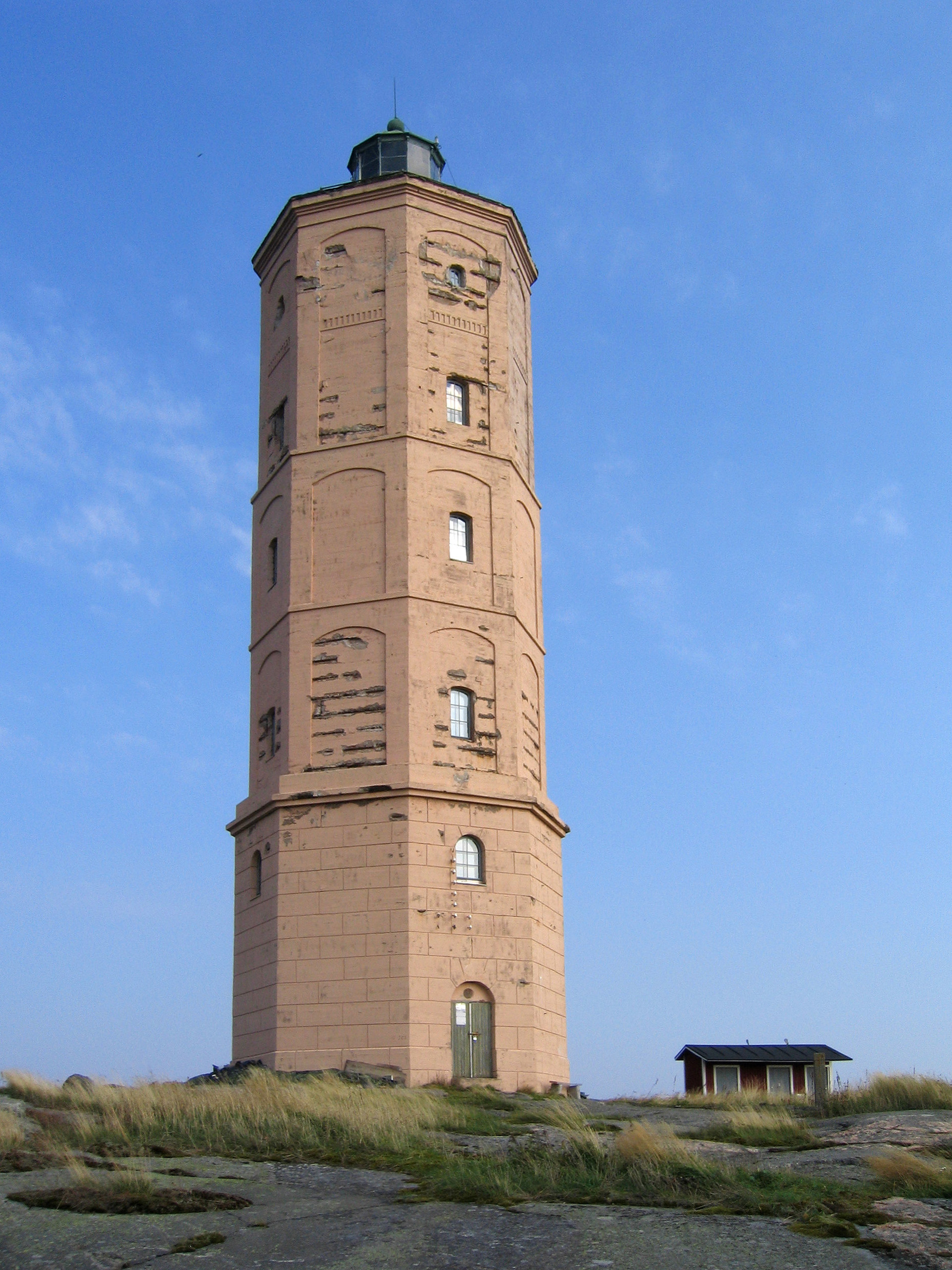
Söderskär lighthouse tower

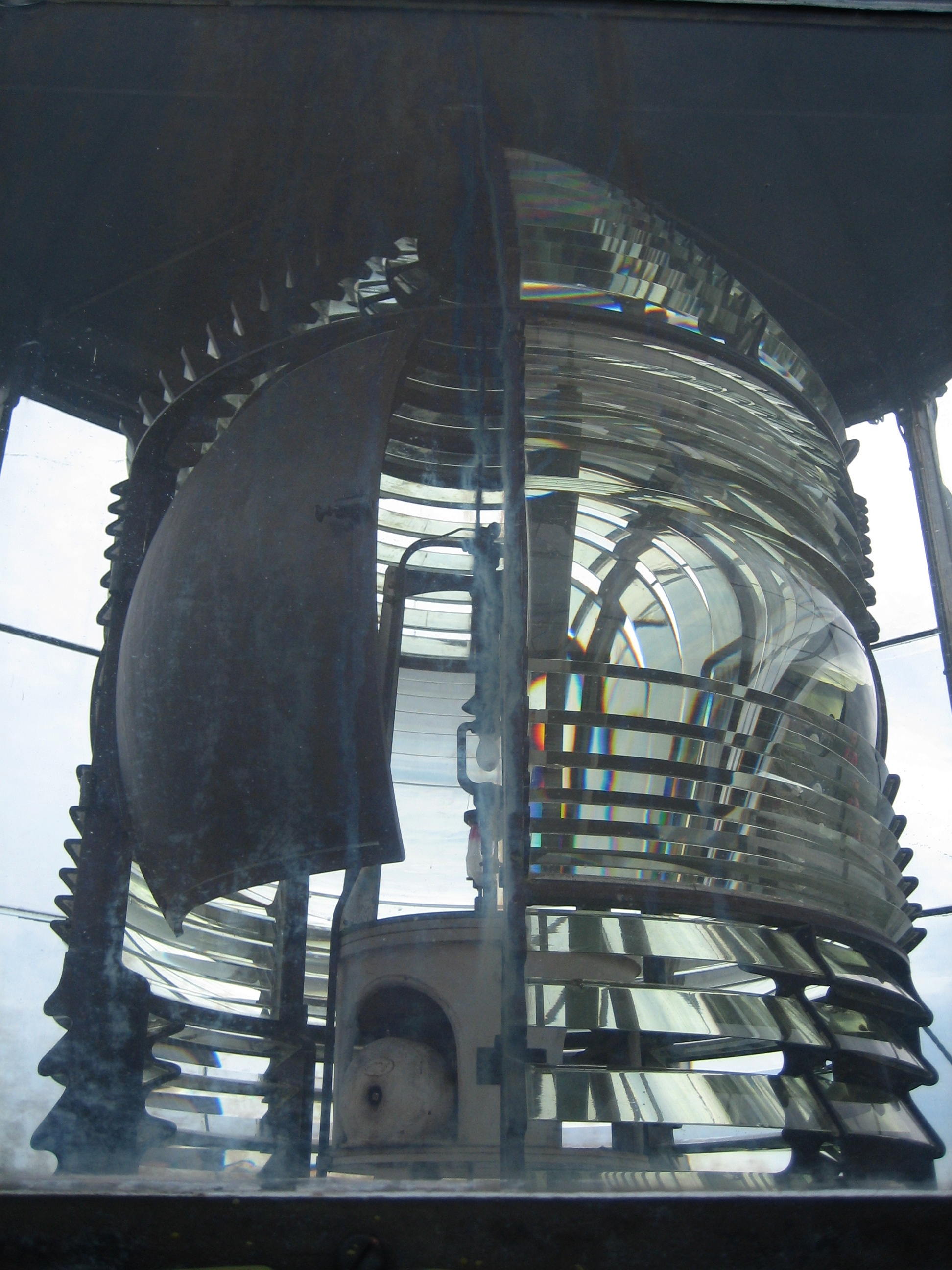
Söderskär light and Fresnel lens
