= Strafe (disambiguation) =

Strafe refers to strafing, the military practice of attacking ground targets from low-flying aircraft.

Strafe may also refer to:

- Strafe (Transformers), a character from the Transformers series
- Strafe (video game), a 2017 video game
- Strafe (band), a hip-hop group

== See also ==
- Strafing (video games), a video game maneuver
- William Gott (1897–1942), British lieutenant-general nicknamed "Strafer"
