= Contest 25 OC =

Sailboat class

Development
- Designer: Jacques De Ridder
- Location: Netherlands
- Year: 1982
- No. built: 30
- Builder: Conyplex
- Role: Cruiser
- Name: Contest 25 OC

Boat
- Displacement: 3,788 lb (1,718 kg)
- Draft: 4.92 ft (1.50 m)

Hull
- Type: monohull
- Construction: fibreglass
- LOA: 24.61 ft (7.50 m)
- LWL: 20.51 ft (6.25 m)
- Beam: 9.02 ft (2.75 m)
- Engine: Volvo Penta 7 hp (5 kW) diesel engine

Hull appendages
- Keel: fin keel
- Ballast: 1,510 lb (685 kg)
- Rudder: internally-mounted spade-type rudder

Rig
- Rig type: Bermuda rig

Sails
- Sailplan: fractional rigged sloop
- Mainsail area: 170 sq ft (16 m^{2})
- Jib/genoa area: 136 sq ft (12.6 m^{2})
- Spinnaker area: 420 sq ft (39 m^{2})
- Other sails: genoa 199 sq ft (18.5 m^{2})
- Upwind sail area: 369 sq ft (34.3 m^{2})
- Downwind sail area: 590 sq ft (55 m^{2})

Racing
- PHRF: 264

The Contest 25 OC (Off-shore Cruiser), sometimes called the Contest 25OC, is a Dutch trailerable sailboat that was designed by Jacques De Ridder as a cruiser and first built in 1982.

The design is a production follow-on to the 1959 Contest 25-1 and the 1974 Contest 25-2, both unrelated designs.

== Production ==
The design was built by Contest Yachts, a brand of Conyplex of the Netherlands. Production started in 1982 and ended in 1985, with about 30 boats completed, but it is now out of production. Production ended as a result of the early 1980s recession.

== Design ==
The Contest 25 OC is a recreational keelboat, built predominantly of fibreglass, with wood trim. It has a 7/8 fractional sloop rig with a deck-stepped mast with no spreaders, wire standing rigging and aluminum spars. The hull has a raked stem, a plumb transom, an internally mounted spade-type rudder controlled by a tiller and a fixed fin keel. It displaces 3,788 lb (1,718 kg) and carries 1,510 lb (685 kg) of cast iron ballast.

The boat has a draft of 4.92 ft (1.50 m) with the standard keel.

The boat is fitted with a Swedish Volvo Penta diesel engine of 7 hp (5 kW) for docking and manoeuvring. The fuel tank holds 20.4 U.S. gallons (77 L; 17.0 imp gal) and the fresh water tank has a capacity of 26 U.S. gallons (98 L; 22 imp gal).

The design has sleeping accommodation for four people, with a double "V"-berth in the bow cabin and two straight settees in the main cabin. The galley is located on the port side just aft of the bow cabin. The galley is equipped with a two-burner stove and a sink. The head is located just aft of the bow cabin on both sides. Cabin headroom is 64 in (160 cm).

For sailing downwind the design may be equipped with a spinnaker of 420 sq ft (39 m^{2}). The boat has a PHRF racing average handicap of 264 and a hull speed of 6.2 kn (11.5 km/h).

== Operational history ==
In a 2010 review Steve Henkel wrote, "best features: The beam on the Contest is a foot wider than any of her comp[etitor]s. and her freeboard amidships is also relatively high ... Worst features: The Contest’s relatively deep draft (4'11") and fixed fin limit her cruising ground to deep-water territory, and her high PHRF must have been a disappointment to prospective buyers."

== See also ==
- List of sailing boat types
