= Mei Wahs =

Chinese-American girls' basketball teams

Mei Wahs (美華) refers to two separate Chinese-American girls' basketball teams dating from the 1930s. One team was in Los Angeles and the other existed in San Francisco. Both were located in their respective Chinatowns and attempted to use their achievements in basketball as a form of social capital in a land, which at the time, still codified discrimination in its laws. Most of the girls who joined the Mei Wah teams were teenagers, the daughters of first-generation immigrants who spoke Cantonese. This meant they came from low-income backgrounds, had to work in the service industry and barely lived above the poverty line. Few had hope to attend college or find suitable jobs after college. Translated literally, Mei Wah means "Chinese in America." As part of the wider trend in women's sports, the Mei Wahs stand out as among the notable programs in the early history of women's basketball. Their stories form part of the growing body of work regarding the history of Chinese Americans.

== San Francisco Mei Wahs ==
Competing in the women's city recreational league, the SF Mei Wahs found success by pushing an uptempo style game. The girls' teams also played other Chinese-American women's teams as well as pick-up games against males of their social group. For the most part, Chinese-American girls were unwelcome on school basketball teams; the hostility they faced spurred creation of their own teams. These athletes had to share facilities with the rest of the entire Chinese-American community in SF. At the time, one playground served the entirety of Chinatown, San Francisco. Nevertheless, the SF Mei Wahs captured their division title, two years in a row. The Chinese-American community also had a male basketball team, named the Hong Wah Kues.

== Los Angeles Mei Wahs ==
Currently the oldest and still functioning L.A.'s women's club for Chinese-Americans, the Mei Wah Club was founded in 1931. Ten girls founded the club around their mutual love for basketball. Eventually, the club became involved in fund raising efforts to help refugees in China fleeing the turmoil of the warlord era. The club's fund raising efforts continued after World War II. In addition to playing basketball, the Los Angeles Mei Wahs also formed the first all-Chinese girls' drum corps. Headed under David Soo Hoo, brother of community leader Peter Soo Hoo, the Mei Wah drum corps competed throughout Southern California, earning numerous awards. As of 1998, 14 members remained active, meeting bimonthly and continuing with their philanthropic efforts.

The LA Mei Wahs were also disadvantaged in height against their opponents and had to learn survival skills on the court. Along with the Lo Wah, the all-black Athena Athletic Club the Queen Esther Japanese and others, the Mei Wahs helped popularize amateur female sports in Los Angeles.

== Responding to Their Environment ==
When considering the work of Drs. Maxine Baca Zinn and Bonnie Thornton Dill, it can be argued the Mei Wahs responded to their environment in the vein of multiracial feminism. The Mei Wahs' formation was unique to their position in the Chinatown community as girls and people of color. At the time, there were far fewer sports for females than there were for males. Furthermore, as Chinese, the girls were subjected to discrimination and faced difficulty in finding jobs and gaining acceptance as female athletes.
