= Contest (1804 ship) =

Australian sloop wrecked in 1807

Contest was an Australian sloop wrecked in 1807. She was a sloop of some 44 tons (bm), built in Port Jackson, New South Wales, by James Underwood, owned by Kable & Co, and registered on 20 July 1804. On 28 February 1807 she was sailing for Newcastle, New South Wales, but the wind would not allow her to make the harbour and so she continued north. A little short of Port Stephens, New South Wales, a heavy storm drove Contest ashore, where she was smashed to pieces. All the crew were saved but no cargo was salvageable.
