= Contestável =

Political magazine in Portugal

Contestável (Portuguese: to Contest) was a magazine published in Lisbon, Portugal, in the 1970s. The magazine was published by RAL 1, which was a left-wing light artillery regiment. The group was also known as Soldiers of the Light Artillery Regiment. It was one of the significant groups in the formation of Armed Forces Movement and the Carnation Revolution in 1974.
