= Contesti =

Contesti may refer to:

== People ==
- Samuel Contesti, figure skater

== Places ==
- Conțești River
- Conțești, Dâmbovița
- Conțești, Teleorman
