= HMS Contest =

Ten ships of the Royal Navy have borne the name HMS Contest:

- HMS Contest (1797) or Gunboat No. 16 was a 14-gun vessel launched in 1797 and broken up in 1799.
- HMS Contest (1799 gun-brig) was a 5-gun gun-brig, previously the Dutch Hell-hound. She was captured in 1799 and broken up in 1803.
- HMS Contest (1799 schooner) was a 14-gun schooner purchased in 1799 and broken up later that year.
- HMS Contest (1804) was a 12-gun gun-brig launched in 1804; she foundered in 1809.
- HMS Contest (1812) was a 12-gun gun-brig launched in 1812 and wrecked in 1828.
- HMS Contest (1846) was a 12-gun brig launched in 1846 and broken up in 1868.
- HMS Contest (1874) was a composite screw gunboat launched in 1874 and scrapped in 1889.
- HMS Contest (1894) was a Banshee-class destroyer launched in 1894 and sold in 1911.
- HMS Contest (1913) was an Acasta-class destroyer launched in 1913 and sunk by SM U-106 in 1917.
- HMS Contest (R12) was a C-class destroyer launched in 1944 and sold in 1960.
