= The Contest (DC Comics) =

1994 comic book story arc

- The Contest graphic novel, art by Mike Deodato.
- Publisher: DC Comics
- Publication date: September 1994 – January 1995
- Genre: Superhero; Mythology
- Title(s): Wonder Woman vol. 2, #0 and 90-93
- Main characters: Wonder Woman; Artemis; Hippolyta

Creative team
- Writer: William Messner-Loebs
- Penciller: Mike Deodato
- Letterer: John Costanza
- Colorist: Patricia Mulvihill
- Editor: Paul Kupperberg
- Trade paperback: ISBN 978-1-56389-194-6

The Contest is a comic book story arc that occurred in 1994 written by William Messner-Loebs and drawn by Mike Deodato. It compiled a segment of the second volume of the DC Comics Wonder Woman comic book from issues #90 through #93 and issue #0 into a collected book edition.

== Storyline ==
=== Two tribes ===
After discovering that the witch Circe caused her island home to disappear, Wonder Woman forced her to return the island and her fellow Amazons to their original location. When she goes to the island she discovers the buildings demolished and is shot at with an arrow by an unknown assailant. Wonder Woman, also known as Diana, then finds her Amazon sisters and is told what had happened to the island during its disappearance.

She is told that during one past night the island was invaded by an outside Amazon tribe called the Amazons of Bana-Mighdall. A huge tribal war was held lasting several days for command of the island. During the battle the witch Circe appeared in the skies above the island revealing that she was responsible for the Amazons appearing on the island and that she meant to destroy both tribes by then sending the island to a dimension of demons. Once this was done a legion of demons began to attack and devour the Amazons. Seeing the situation for what it was, the warring Amazons temporarily put their rivalries aside so that they could properly defend themselves against the demons. This way of life lasted until the island was magically transported back to its original location. Surprisingly to Diana, although the island was gone for a few short months, the length of time the island remained in the demon dimension lasted 10 years.

While Diana was happy to see her mother Queen Hippolyta alive and whole, Hippolyta's demeanor was cold and withdrawn, even in the presence of her daughter. When Hippolyta asked how much progress Diana has made in the outside world as Wonder Woman, she became angry and hostile to her daughter when Diana told her that the process was a lot slower than expected. Because of this Hippolyta announced that a new Contest would be held for a new Wonder Woman to be sent in Diana's place.

=== Enter: Artemis ===
Angered and confused, Diana went to her friend Mala for some solace. While talking to her Diana found herself the target for another arrow. She followed the arrow's origin point and found a group of Bana-Mighdallian Amazons having an archery contest. She asks who was the owner of the arrow shot at her earlier and finds that it belonged to the Bana Amazon named Artemis. Artemis tells Diana that the arrow was misdirected but tells her that she has no love for the Themyscirian tribe. Through a yelling match Diana discovers that the reason why the Bana Amazons were teleported to the island by Circe is because they agreed to work for her during the War of the Gods period in exchange for immortality and a new homeland (Diana caused the original city of Bana-Mighdall to be destroyed during an earlier story arc). Not wishing to start another war, one of the Bana Amazons ends the argument and invites Diana to participate in their archery contest. They find that Diana and Artemis are evenly matched on the archery field.

Later Artemis confronts Diana yet again when she finds a posting by Queen Hippolyta stating that the Amazons of Bana-Mighdall are not allowed to participate in the Contest to find the new Wonder Woman. Diana tells Artemis that she was unaware of the post and accompanies Artemis into the Bana camp, which is located in the harshest corner of the island. There she finds the new tribe living in base conditions. When she tries to interact with the Amazons she finds both hate and an unspoken awe at her presence. The Bana's "Keeper" or historian then invites Diana and Artemis to see their tribe's most sacred relic: a bust of the tribe's founding queen Antiope, Diana's long dead aunt. Upon seeing the bust Diana is surprised to discover that Queen Antiope looks exactly like Diana.

When the new Contest to find a new Wonder Woman goes underway a group of Bana Amazons appear. Among them is Diana's newest friend and rival, Artemis. Queen Hippolyta asks why they are there and Diana tells her that she invited them. Diana then turns to her fellow tribe of Amazons and asks for a vote of the whole to see if the Bana Amazons should be allowed in the Contest or not. The majority of Diana's tribe agree, thus out voting Queen Hippolyta's rule. Hippolyta grudgingly submits. Unknown to Diana, Hippolyta has her Army General Philippus create magical traps on the obstacle courses to better cause Diana trouble in winning. She also has the Amazon sorceress Magala transfer half of Diana's powers to the unaware Amazon Artemis so that she has a better chance of winning the title.

During one of the Contest trials another arrow is fired at Diana, this time by an unknown assailant. Seeing the arrow, Artemis uses her newfound speed to leap into the air and catch the arrow before it could strike Diana. As the assassin had left the area immediately after firing the arrow, the Amazons present were unable to discover who the archer was. Later that night Artemis confronts a Bana Amazon named Patrice in private. Artemis pins her to a tree and tells her that she recognized Patrice's arrow fletching. Patrice admits that she was the one who shot the arrow at Diana but says that she did it so that Artemis could win the Contest, thereby causing their tribe to regain their honor among the Amazon nation. Artemis then reprimands Patrice telling her that no Bana Amazon will win the Contest as she believes Hippolyta only initiated the Contest to somehow punish Diana. She tells her that Diana will probably win the Contest but that if the Bana tribe makes a good showing during the trials that they could prove their honorable favor in the eyes of the other tribe. She further states that spilling royal blood would only cause more war for their people. As Patrice apologizes to Artemis, Diana can be seen listening in to their conversation from a hidden location.

=== History revealed ===
While resting between Contest tournaments, Diana begins to have strange visions of being in her aunt Antiope's body 3,000 years earlier, during the time the Amazons were invaded by the Olympian barbarian Herakles. In the visions she sees that after Herakles had drugged and enslaved the Amazons that Queen Hippolyta refused to fight against Herakles because she loved him. Angered by Hippolyta's inaction Antiope took charge and used an item called the Mask of Proteus to magically disguise herself as Herakles. In his form she commanded Herakles' men to free the Amazons. After doing this the Amazons reclaimed their city. Disgusted by her sister, Antiope left Hippolyta (taking half the Amazons with her) and went to find revenge against Herakles and his lackey Theseus. Antiope told Hippolyta before leaving that she could never trust her again.

In the last tournament of the Contest, which consisted of a race, Diana was slowed down by magical copies of ancient creatures along the way: the whirlpool Charybdis, Medusa and Harpies. Because Diana had to stop these creatures from not only destroying herself but also those around her, Artemis was able to surpass Diana and win the Contest. As gifts to Artemis for winning, Queen Hippolyta gave her the Lasso of Truth, Hermes' winged sandals which allowed her to fly, and the Gauntlets of Atlas which increase its wearer's strength by 10. Hippolyta also announced that she considered Artemis to be her daughter and gave her Diana's royal tiara to wear during her duration as Wonder Woman.

Content that Diana no longer carried the Wonder Woman title, Hippolyta pulled Diana aside and told her that she is to be groomed to preside as Queen over the new tribe of Amazons. Still angered at her mother and by the Contest's outcome, Diana revealed the Bust of Antiope to a surprised Hippolyta. Diana confronted Hippolyta as to why she looked exactly like her aunt and with the revelation that she knew about Antiope and Hippolyta's last meeting. Shocked, Hippolyta said the story was a lie. Diana failed to believe her and asked her if Herakles was really her father. Before she could answer Diana left her mother behind, similar to the way Antiope had so many centuries prior. Diana then left the island all together in order to return to her outworld life in Boston. In Boston a media crew is seen filming a super human attack. They are surprised to see Artemis wearing the Wonder Woman uniform and Diana, aiding her, in a new black outfit.
