= Competition (disambiguation) =

Competition is any rivalry between two or more parties.

Competition may also refer to:

- Competition (economics), competition between multiple companies, i.e. two or more businesses competing to provide goods or services to another party
- Competition (biology), interaction between living things in which the fitness of one is lowered by the presence of another
- Competition (film), a 1915 short film directed by B. Reeves Eason
- "Competition" (The Spectacular Spider-Man), an episode of the animated television series The Spectacular Spider-Man
- Competition, Missouri, United States, a town in south-central Missouri, about 50 miles northeast of Springfield
- Chatham, Virginia, formerly named Competition, a town in Pittsylvania County, Virginia, United States
- "Competition", a 2013 song by Little Mix from Salute

== See also ==
- The Competition (disambiguation)
- Contest (disambiguation)
