= Contest of Champions =

Contest of Champions may refer to:

- Marvel Super Hero Contest of Champions, a 1982 limited series
- Contest of Champions II, a 1999 limited series
- "Contest of Champions", Fantastic Four: World's Greatest Heroes episodes 24 (2007)
- Marvel Contest of Champions, a 2014 video game
- "Contest of Champions", Ultimate Spider-Man season 3, episodes 23–26 (2015)
