= CSS Alabama's Indian Ocean expeditionary raid =

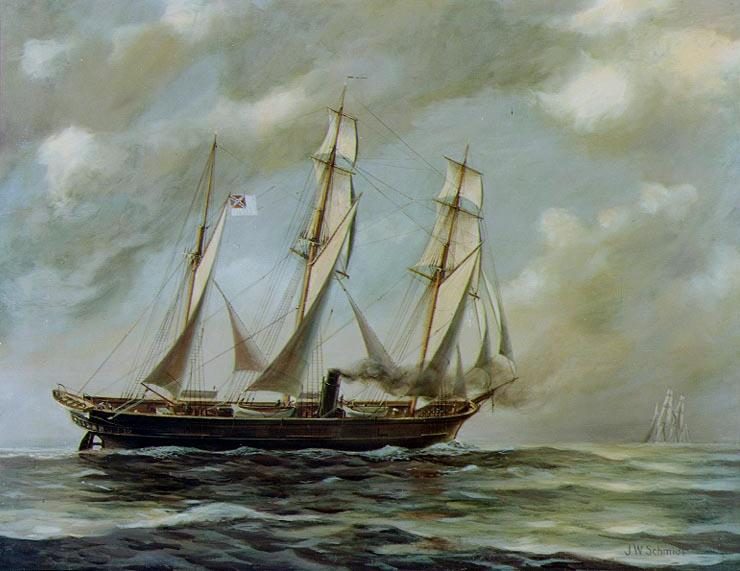
CSS Alabama

CSS Alabama's Indian Ocean expeditionary raid commenced shortly after the Confederate States Navy ship CSS Alabama left the Cape of Good Hope and cruised across the Indian Ocean ultimately exiting via the Sunda Strait into the Java Sea from where she proceeded through the Karimata Strait past the west coast of Borneo before turning west towards Singapore. The raid lasted from about the end of September 1863 to the end of November 1863.

The primary area of operation during this expeditionary raid, was the central Indian Ocean, across the Tropic of Capricorn, steaming east toward the Dutch East Indies.

== Raid overview ==
CSS Alabama worked its way east from the Cape of Good Hope through rough weather, passing the islands of St. Peter Island and St. Paul Island in the Indian Ocean, which are about halfway to the Strait of Sunda. Alabama crossed the Tropic of Capricorn and conferred with the captain of an English bark, learning that USS Wyoming, a Union steamer, was patrolling in the Strait of Sunda with a tender, and anchored nightly at Krakatoa Island.

Many of the ships intercepted during this period were English or Dutch ships. However, on November 6, Alabama's captain, Semmes, learned from an English ship out of Fuzhou (Foochow) that Winged Racer, escorted by USS Wyoming was coming out of the strait. Alabama pursued and overhauled two English ships before coming upon Amanda, out of Boston, laden with sugar and hemp. Semmes and crew set Amanda alight by 10:00 pm.

Getting underway for the Strait of Sunda, Alabama sailed past Keyser Island, Beezee island and Sowbooks Island, and then passed through the strait, on to Thwart-the-Way Island and Stroom Rock, not finding USS Wyoming. However, on November 8, amidst a rain squall, Alabama sighted sail and chased down the unescorted Winged Racer. The crew and master were put in boats to row ashore to nearby land at North Island, and Winged Racer was burnt.

CSS Alabama then proceeded toward the China Sea, passing Sumatra and Java, and arrived in Gasper Strait. Around daylight, new sail was sighted, and a Yankee clipper headed toward Alabama only to find the Confederate flag unfurled when Captain Semmes hoisted a change of colors. The clipper added topsails, and opened chase. The clipper Contest encountered a slack in the wind during the midday qualms, which allowed Alabama to bring the ship within gun range. To the regret of Captain Semmes, he could not capture the new prize and outfit her for service in the Confederate Navy, and so he reluctantly burnt her.

From this raiding area in the Dutch East Indies, CSS Alabama returned, via Singapore, to the Strait of Malacca.

== Raid bounty ==
CSS Alabama's Indian Ocean Expeditionary Raid
| Date | Ship name | Tonnage | Ship type | Location | Disposition of prize |
|---|---|---|---|---|---|
| November 6, 1863 | Amanda | ? | ? | Strait of Sunda | Burned |
| November 9, 1863 | Winged Racer | ? | ? | Strait of Sunda | Burned |
| November 9, 1863 | Contest | ? | Yankee Clipper | North Island, East Indies | Burned |
