= Feliks Tych =

Polish historian and educator

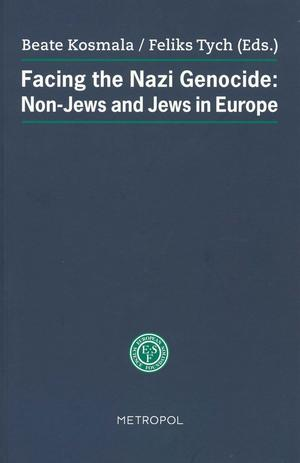
Facing the Nazi genocide (2004)

Feliks Tych (31 July 1929, Warsaw, Poland – 16 February 2015, Warsaw, Poland) was a Polish historian and educator.

From 1995 to 2006, he was Director of the Jewish Historical Institute (Żydowski Instytut Historyczny), served as member of the Council of Science of the Polish Academy of Sciences, and was a member of the editors committee of the Polish Biographical Dictionary.
