= Zvi Gitelman =

American political scientist

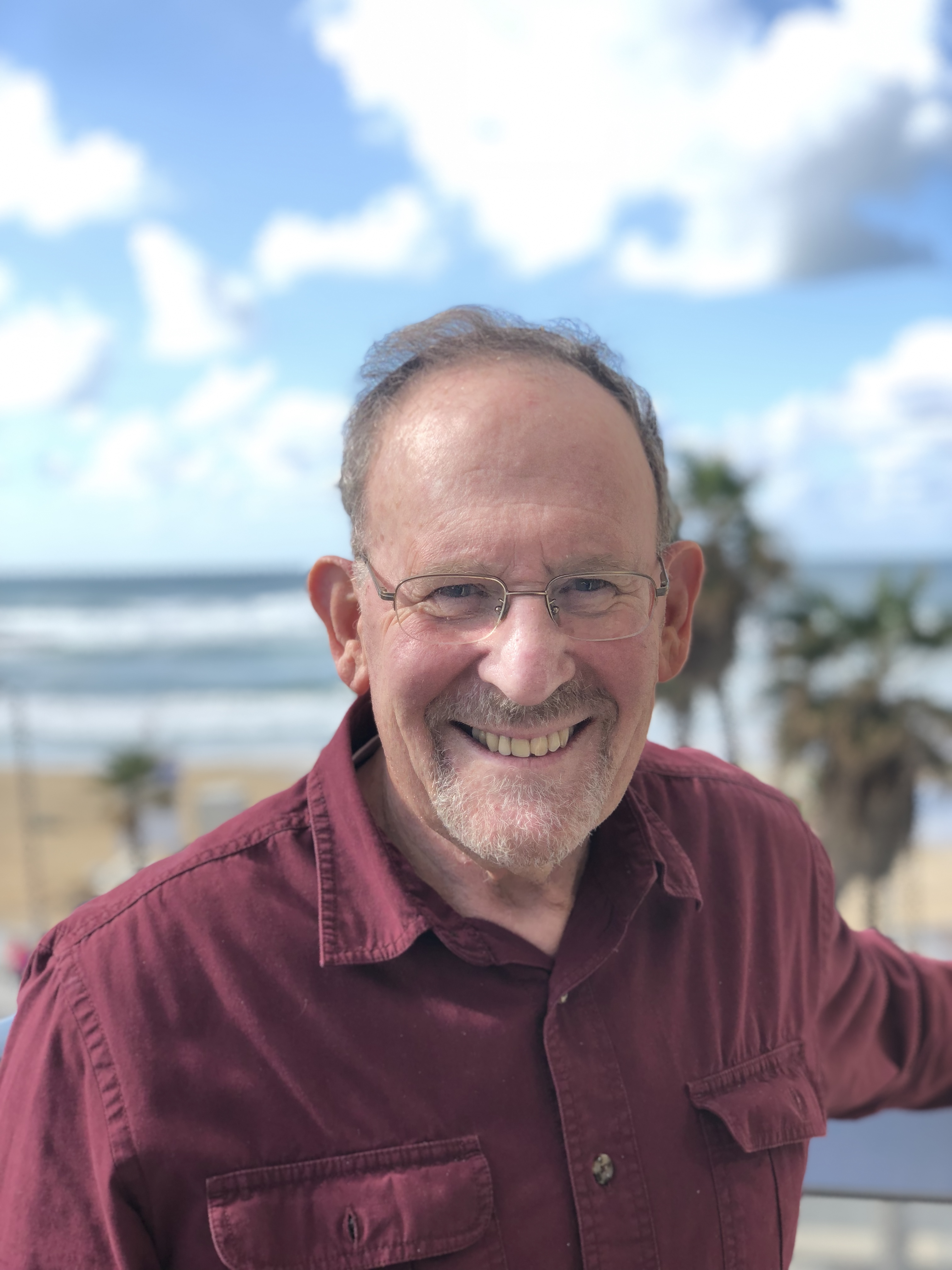
- Zvi Gitelman (2017)
- Awards: Guggenheim Fellowship (1983)

Academic background
- Education: Columbia University (BA, MA, PhD)

Academic work
- Discipline: Judaic Studies
- Institutions: University of Michigan

Zvi Gitelman is a professor of political science that teaches Judaic Studies at the University of Michigan.

== Career ==
Gitelman received a Ph.D., an M.A., and a B.A. degree from Columbia University. He has usually written about the connection of ethnicity and politics especially in former Communist countries. He has also written about Israeli politics, East European politics, as well as Jewish political attitude. Gitelman received a Guggenheim Fellowship in 1983.

He is married to Marlene Gitelman. He has two children, and six grandchildren.

== Publications ==
- Jewish Nationality and Soviet Politics (1972)
- Becoming Israelis: Political Resocialization of Soviet and American Immigrants (1982)
- A Century of Ambivalence: The Jews of Russia and the Soviet Union, 1881 to the Present (1988; 2001)
- Bitter Legacy: Confronting the Holocaust in the USSR (1997)
- Jewish Life after the USSR (2003)
