= Open class system =

An open class system is the stratification that facilitates social mobility, with individual achievement and personal merit determining social rank. The hierarchical social status of a person is achieved through their effort. Any status that is based on family background, ethnicity, gender, and religion, which is also known as ascribed status, becomes less important. There is no distinct line between the classes and there would be more positions within that status. Core industrial nations seem to have more of an ideal open class system. In an open class system there is scope for social mobility.

== See also ==
- Enculturation
