= Such a Beautiful Sunny Day =

- First edition (Polish)
- Author: Barbara Engelking
- Original title: Jest taki piękny, słoneczny dzień: Losy Żydów szukających ratunku na wsi polskiej 1942–1945
- Language: English, Polish
- Subject: Holocaust in Poland
- Publisher: Centrum Badań nad Zagładą Żydów
- Publication date: 2011
- Publication place: Poland, United States
- English publication date: 2016
- Media type: Print
- Pages: 368
- ISBN: 9653085417

Such a Beautiful Sunny Day: Jews Seeking Refuge in the Polish Countryside, 1942–1945 is a 2016 book by Polish historian Barbara Engelking. It was first published in Polish in 2012 as Jest taki piękny, słoneczny dzień: Losy Żydów szukających ratunku na wsi polskiej 1942–1945. It focuses on the subject matter of The Holocaust in Poland.

== Content ==
The book argues the thesis that in fact, the majority of Jews who sought refuge in the Polish countryside did not survive. In line with other estimates, Engelking hypothesizes that about 10% of Jews tried to escape into the countryside, around 160,000 people. Around 30,000 to 40,000 of these are estimated to have survived which means that the remaining 120,000 were murdered. Engelking states that greed was the most common reason for the murder or handing over of Jews to the police, but some considered the "Jew hunts" a form of recreation. According to Engelking the Polish underground, including Home Army and the National Armed Forces were involved in the murder of Jews. This conclusion is shared by other researchers.

== Reception ==
In a review of Engelking's book Grzegorz Rossoliński-Liebe wrote that it challenged the German tendency to neglect non-German Holocaust perpetrators, as well as the Polish tendency to view Poles in German-occupied Poland solely as victims.

In 2013 historian Samuel Kassow writing for Yad Vashem Studies described Engelking's work and that of three other scholars (Jan Grabowski, Alina Skibińska, and Dariusz Libionka) as a "historical achievement of the first order", undermining "the self-serving myths about Polish-Jewish relations in World War II".

Monika Rice reviewing the book for the Holocaust and Genocide Studies in 2013 praised the book for challenging the "idealized image of universal Polish willingness to rescue Jews [which] came to predominate in so much Polish scholarship" and concludes that her book "destroys a prevalent Polish myth that Jewish survivors were universally assisted by Poles" and that it is "an essential read for anyone genuinely interested in the Holocaust, Polish-Jewish relations, and Polish history".

Havi Dreifuss reviewing this book as part of a series of books in The American Historical Review noted that the work "makes a significant contribution to Holocaust research" and addresses the under-researched topic of the final stages of the Holocaust in Poland. He praises the book for "shattering the earlier division of people into categories of perpetrators, victims, and bystanders" and concluded that it "is another example of outstanding research by Barbara Engelking, whose research continues to change the discourse of Holocaust studies."

The Polish edition was also well-received in Poland with positive reviews in the popular history magazine Histmag and online history portal Historia.org.pl.

A critical review of the book was published in 2018 by Piotr Gontarczyk in Dzieje Najnowsze. In his review, Gontarczyk criticized the book methodology. He challenged the factual accuracy of Engelking's book, specifically her description of two individuals, the Hryć brothers, whom the author describes as murderers of Jews. Gontarczyk points out that Engelking makes her claims, taking at face value post-war denunciations made in Stalinist-era Poland which were dismissed in court when it turned out the brothers had spent the war hiding from the Germans in a completely different village than the one where the murders took place. Furthermore, Gontarczyk charges Engelking with misrepresenting sources; for example, she states that the brothers were recognized in a line-up by one of the witnesses, but the court documents actually state the opposite. Engelking, according to Gontarczyk, also ignores the fact that the denunciations were mutually contradictory. Gontarczyk hypothesizes that the author abandoned scholarly standards and falsely accused the brothers, despite the information in the sources, because the brutal nature of the accusations made, and the vivid descriptions of the murders given, by some of the witnesses fit in with her overall thesis. Gontarczyk also enumerated several other instances in the book where Engelking's claims are contradicted by her own primary documents, and where she misidentifies or misportrays individuals who had been denounced and falsely accused of similar crimes.

== See also ==
- Hunt for the Jews: Betrayal and Murder in German-Occupied Poland
