= Hunt for the Jews =

2013 book about the Holocaust in Poland by Jan Grabowski

Hunt for the Jews: Betrayal and Murder in German-Occupied Poland
- First edition (Polish)
- Author: Jan Grabowski
- Original title: Judenjagd: polowanie na Żydów 1942-1945
- Language: English / Polish / Hebrew
- Subject: Holocaust in Poland
- Publisher: Indiana University Press / Center for Holocaust Studies
- Publication date: 2011
- Publication place: Canada / Poland / Israel
- English publication date: 2013
- Media type: Print
- Pages: 303 / 257
- ISBN: 9780253010872 Polish book is 9788393220205

Hunt for the Jews: Betrayal and Murder in German-Occupied Poland is a 2013 book about the Holocaust in Poland by Jan Grabowski. The 2013 English edition followed a 2011 Polish-language edition (published as Judenjagd: polowanie na Żydów) and was in turn followed by a 2016 Hebrew edition.

The book describes the Judenjagd (German: "Jew hunt") from 1942 onwards, focusing on Dąbrowa Tarnowska County, a rural area in southeastern Poland. The Judenjagd was the German search for Jews who had escaped from the German-liquidated ghettos in Poland and tried to hide among the non-Jewish population.

Grabowski asserts that most of the Jews in hiding perished due to betrayal by local Poles, either via denunciation to German authorities or after being taken captive and being delivered by locals to the German gendarmerie or German-run "Polish police".

The book sparked a heated public debate, particularly when first published in Poland in 2011.

== Contents ==
The book describes the Judenjagd (German for "Jew hunt") that began in 1942 and focuses on Dąbrowa, a former rural county in southeastern Poland (till 1939; later part of a German-administered Kreishauptmannschaft Tarnów). Grabowski describes an entire system set up by the Germans to extirpate Jews:

The German policy was based on terror. Poles faced the death penalty for any help they gave to Jews. Also, the Germans created a so-called “hostage” system among the Poles. In every community they designated people who would be rotated every couple of weeks. They were responsible for informing the Polish police, or the Germans, about Jews hiding in their towns. If a Jew was discovered that had not been reported, the so-called hostages would be harshly punished. So everyone was highly motivated to get rid of the Jews.

According to Grabowski, Poles were responsible, directly or indirectly, for the deaths of more than 200,000 Jews during the Holocaust. He held this estimate to be very conservative, as he did not include victims of the Polish Blue Police. "The great majority of Jews in hiding perished as a consequence of betrayal. They were denounced or simply seized, tied up and delivered by locals to the nearest station of the Polish police, or to the German gendarmerie."

In a later, 17 March 2018, interview in the Polish daily newspaper Gazeta Wyborcza – in connection with the 2018 publication of Dalej jest noc, a two-volume study co-edited with Barbara Engelking and now covering ten counties (Hunt for the Jews had covered one county) – Grabowski said that, while he did believe 200,000 Jews died while in hiding, he was unable to determine the exact percentage of that number who perished, directly or indirectly, due to acts by Poles; and that his claim that Poles were responsible for the deaths of over 200,000 Jews was a "research hypothesis", though he continued to believe that Poles were responsible for the majority of that number. Nevertheless, in the same interview Grabowski said that the limited number (ten) of Polish counties covered in the research newly published in 2018 might lead other scholars to conclude that the research cannot be used to draw general conclusions.

The 2013 English edition was based on the 2011 Polish edition, but improved and augmented with additional evidence, cases, and discoveries.

== Reception ==
=== Awards and public debate ===
In 2014 Hunt for the Jews was awarded the Yad Vashem International Book Prize for Holocaust Research. The book sparked a heated public debate, particularly when first published in Poland in 2011, especially for its assertion that Poles were either directly or indirectly responsible for the deaths of 200,000 Jews during the Holocaust. Grabowski had received death threats.

=== English-language reviews ===
Glenn R. Sharfman, a professor at Oglethorpe University in Atlanta, wrote that Grabowski's book complemented recent works by Jan T. Gross about murders of Jews away from the primary killing centers, providing evidence of the important role of Poles in aiding the Nazis. Sharfman wrote that any student of the Holocaust will find the testimonies and excerpts in the text useful, but readers with little background might require more context. He noted that Grabowski jumps from testimony to testimony without analysis. According to Sharfman, while most Poles were victims of Nazi aggression and have wanted to see themselves as purely its victims, Grabowski shows how some Poles played an official or unofficial role in the murder of tens of thousands, if not more, of Jews.

Przemysław Różański, a professor of history at the University of Gdańsk, reviewed the 2011 edition of the book and had a number of reservations, including Grabowski's presentation of forced participation of peasants as "cooperation", and his disregard, in relation to the paid rescue of Jews, of the dire economic conditions faced by Poles. He argues that extremely poor and often starving villagers couldn't be expected to provide shelter for Jews, risking a death sentence in the process, and that the high number of people lending such help questions Grabowski's claims of collaboration of the villagers. While agreeing on the nature of prewar antisemitism in Poland, he disagreed with Grabowski's suggestion of a causal relation between that and the events described in the book, instead explaining it as a result of Nazi propaganda. Różański concludes that, despite his reservations, the book is a "valuable and useful work" which "[illustrates the] changes in local pathology taking place under German occupation in ... the Generalgouvernement".

Timothy Snyder of Yale University called Judenjagd "the most important in the recent Polish debates about Polish responsibility for the Holocaust", and wrote that Grabowski and Barbara Engelking had recorded the "undeniable fact that most of [the Polish Jews who had escaped from the ghettos and camps] were murdered as well, perhaps half of them by Poles (following German policy and law) rather than by Germans."

Historian Shimon Redlich, writing about the book in Slavic Review, criticized the book's structure, in particular the lengthy quotations and appendix, the careless "claim of 'hundreds of thousands' of Jews seeking shelter among the Polish populace", which according to Redlich cannot be extrapolated to the whole country based on one single area, as well as language that at times betrayed emotional involvement. However, Redlich said the book "should become required reading for scholars and students of Polish-Jewish relations".

Sociologist Larry Ray's review of Grabowski's book called it "a highly systematic and scholarly study of atrocities and collaboration", and "an essential contribution to knowledge of the Holocaust and Polish-Jewish relations".

Following the book's publication in Israel in 2016, Grzegorz Berendt, professor of history at the University of Gdańsk and historian for the Polish government's Institute of National Remembrance, wrote in Haaretz, in February 2017, that, in contrast to several other European countries, Poland's elite groups, in the underground or in exile, opposed Germany's policies toward the Jews, and expressed and acted on this opposition repeatedly. Anyone holding an official position inside occupied Poland, including the police, was obliged to follow German orders or face harsh punishment, which might be a beating or public execution. Conversely, prizes, including property plundered from Jews, were awarded for compliance. German-induced poverty in Poland—rationing of 400–700 calories per person, leading to black-market food at exorbitant prices—meant that "thousands of people discarded moral constraints and decided to assist the Germans in rounding up Jews for economic reasons". Berendt referred to Grabowski's statement in Hunt for the Jews that "the number of victims [in Poland] of the Judenjagd could reach 200,000" as "hot air", in that it substantially exceeds, he wrote, the approximately 50,000 Jews thought to have escaped from the ghettos in occupied Poland.

The following month, Grabowski responded in Hararetz that, until recently, Poles who were made Righteous Among the Nations often asked Yad Vashem to allow them to remain anonymous, so fearful were they of their fellow Poles' reaction. He argued that, although the Polish government-in-exile (which was based in London from 1940 until 1990) had indeed spoken out on behalf of the Jews during the Holocaust, they were not supported in this by the Polish resistance or the general population in Poland. Key members of the Polish resistance had referred to the "Jewish problem" or "Jewish question": Grabowski quoted one prominent member of the underground: "The mass murder of Jews in Poland carried out by the Germans will diminish the Jewish problem but it will not remove it altogether." As for the estimate that up to 200,000 Jews were killed by Poles, Grabowski defended the figure, claiming that it derives from careful research conducted by the Polish historian Szymon Datner. Datner, however, wrote that 200,000 was the total number of Jews who had escaped from the ghettos, of whom about half subsequently died from various causes. Grabowski later admitted in a subsequent interview that Szymon Datner had not made the claim he attributed to him.

Reviewing the book in April 2016, Michael Fleming, a British historian specializing in Polish history, wrote in support of Grabowski, describing the criticism as attempts to "reinstitute the old, discredited heroic narrative of unimpeachable Polish conduct". Arguing that these tales of heroism are common in Europe, he wrote that Grabowski's book is part of a "growing body of corrective scholarship" that discusses the indifference or complicity of European populations. He continued that Grabowski highlights the courage of the rescuers in Dąbrowa County, while demonstrating that "those who were complicit in genocide were more successful than those who sought to shelter their Jewish co-citizens." But this observation also applies to populations beyond Poland's borders. Fleming warned readers and reviewers not to "reinforce orientalist narratives about 'Eastern' Europe" or the idea that only populations close to the genocide could stop it, which he calls "fetishiz[ing] spatial proximity".

Historian Jack Fischel in a Jewish Book Council review, wrote that "One concludes from Grabowski’s important study that without the often unforced, and sometimes enthusiastic support of non-German volunteers and helpers, the Germans would not have succeeded as completely as they did during the Holocaust."

Historian Samuel Kassow, in a review essay in Yad Vashem Studies, wrote, of Grabowski's book and those of three other scholars (Alina Skibinska, Barbara Engelking, and Dariusz Libionka), that they "are a historical achievement of the first order." He described them as undermining "the self-serving myths about Polish-Jewish relations in World War II", and as being works of careful and objective scholarship.

Rosa Lehmann, writing in The American Historical Review, found Grabowski's work to be outstanding and firmly grounded in solid research. According to Lehmann, the book illuminates the struggle of survival and circumstances of death of the some 10 percent of the 2.5 million Polish-Jews who attempted to seek refuge on the "Aryan" side among hostile peasant gentiles. According to Lehmann, Grabowski shows how this created a dichotomy between Jewish and gentile perceptions of the Holocaust, Jews holding Polish peasants responsible for Jewish suffering and death, while Polish accounts trivialize the Polish involvement and paradoxically stress the "helping phenomenon" in wartime Poland. Lehmann writes that the evidence in the book shows that the category of "bystander" should be reevaluated, as the attitudes of the local population had fundamental and existential importance for escaping Jews. Lehmann finds interesting Grabowski's conclusion that the murder of some 700 Jews in incidents and pogroms in post-war Poland are an inherent continuation of the wartime practice of Judenjagd. Lehmann concludes by recommending the book for those interested in Polish-Jewish relations and Holocaust studies.

Historian Joshua D. Zimmerman's review in The Journal of Modern History found Grabowski's work to be a "weighty, superbly researched study" that punctuated the myth of Polish innocence during the Holocaust. According to Zimmerman, Grabowski's study was not about defaming or glorifying Poland, but rather about the evidence.

Historian John-Paul Himka's review in the East European Jewish Affairs journal, found "Grabowski's exploration of how the moral climate in rural Poland became fatally skewed during the Nazi occupation" to be innovative and enlightening. Himka noted that the young Polish men of the Baudienst yunaki took part in Jew hunts with particular relish, Grabowski recording the atrocities in chilling detail. Himka concluded: "This is a well-written, well-researched, highly illuminating study that takes us deep into the mechanisms of the Holocaust in rural Poland. In short: a brilliant book, and a harrowing read."

Historian William W. Hagen's review notes that Grabowski was harshly attacked by the Polish right-wing media. According to Hagen as with the "pre-Holocaust explanations for the incontrovertible existence of aggressive, violent, and criminal antisemites in Poland", historians who promote a view of "fundamental national innocence" portray Polish collaborators as "scum", unconnected to mainstream society. Grabowski's study which portrays normative Poles viewing the harboring of Jews as a crime or sin challenged Polish self-understanding. Hagen notes that Grabowski "pushes beyond historiographical frontiers" and that his book is a "radical revision" on views regarding hiding Jewish fugitives. Hagen concludes by noting that the book is a landmark work, filled with somber and honest reckoning.

Tomasz Frydel reviewed and reassessed the perpetrator role of ordinary Poles, discussed in Hunt for the Jews. Frydel described the whole Nazi German terror system that was directed not only against Jews but also against Soviet prisoners of war, Roma, the Polish underground, even any newcomers. German police in Poland used sting operations to find and kill rescuers of the Germans' quarries.

=== Polish-language reviews ===
Dariusz Stola commented on Grabowski's choice of subject: "Reading the book, I realized just how little we know about the Polish countryside, the rural social organization and its role in hunting down Jews." He notes Grabowski's description of the hostage system set up by the Germans in the countryside, relying on personal and communal solidarity to galvanize communities against Jewish refugees: "this diabolical mechanism explains to some degree... the hostility, observed in many rural communities, to those who harbored Jews: they could bring disaster not only on themselves, but also on others." Stola states that "the [Dąbrowa Tarnowska] county was not distinct from any similar rural county before or during the war... and yet [Grabowski's] findings have a more general significance - statistically as well." Reviewing some of the data Grabowski used, he writes that "these numbers show how important this book is [as a source on] the occupation period in Polish history. It's not a huge part [of Poland's Jewry] - it concerns, as the author speculates, around 10% of Poland's Jews; its disproportionate significance is [in showing that] the survival of these Jews depended first and foremost on the reactions they got from their environment... without [others'] help their chances of survival were slim." Stola has two reservations regarding the book: first, that Grabowski accepts an older estimate by Szymon Datner for the number of Jews in hiding, which he states is more a "guesstimate" than an "estimate". Second, that there is a general lack of knowledge about Jews in hiding who did not survive, whose deaths are not documented in government records. Stola notes that "Judenjagd speaks not only about the killing but also about the sheltering of Jews (sometimes by the same persons), about various kinds of aid given [to Jews], about... disinterested rescuers who risked their own lives to save people who were hunted like animals." Finally, Stola writes that Grabowski's narrative is "muted" and unemotional, but that the book as a whole is shocking; he recommends reading the book, "but not before bedtime."

Bogdan Musial criticized the 2011 edition as improperly sourced, lacking in witness statements, archival documents, and German statements; and as improperly generalizing the antisemitic attitudes of the perpetrators to the local populace. He also wrote that Grabowski ignored the economic hardships and deportations suffered by Poles, which he believes affected their attitudes toward Jews. Musial wrote that, while the book elaborated on some Poles' prewar antisemitism, it devoted only three sentences to the Germans' antisemitic campaign. He further wrote that the book underestimated the number of Jewish survivors, while inflating the number of Poles complicit in German crimes. Musial noted that Grabowksi did not question statements from Jewish witnesses, but did take issue with those made by Poles. Grabowski rejected Musial's critique, writing that it was an attempt to disparage serious historical research on the basis of its subject matter and conclusions and that it failed to address the quality of the research methodology.

Krystyna Samsonowska of the Jagiellonian University wrote in her review that the book provides "a serious basis for more detailed research", and that its descriptions of the "Judenjagd" phenomena are "extensive, interesting and quite insightful." However, she criticized Grabowski for not using all available resources – for example, not trying to contact families of Jewish survivors from Dąbrowa Tarnowska, or the Poles who hid them. Samsonowska, using other sources, was able identify 90 Jews who had survived the war in hiding in Dąbrowa County, as opposed to the 51 cited by Grabowski. She also states that Grabowski understated by half the number of Righteous Among the Nations from the county.

Łukasz Męczykowski, in a histmag.org review of the 2011 book, wrote that, while some historians try to seek truth calmly and impartially, others prefer passing condemnatory judgments, and Grabowski had chosen the latter path: Grabowski largely focused on finding those supposedly guilty of collaboration, and was averse to acknowledging those who had shown commendable behavior. Męczykowski wrote that Grabowski incorrectly accused Poland's Institute of National Remembrance (IPN) of trying to inflate the number of Polish citizens who helped Jews. Męczykowski wrote that Grabowski contradicted himself on certain points. Also that Grabowski, in calling upon Poles to admit their guilt, seemed unaware that there had long since been an ongoing debate in Poland, including educational programs prepared by Poland's IPN, about Polish participation in atrocities against Jews, which contradicts Grabowski's derogatory assertions about the institute.

Tomasz Szarota, former director of the Department of Research into the History of Post-1945 Poland, at the Institute of History, Polish Academy of Sciences, contrasted Grabowski's narrow focus with that of German historian Daniel Brewing: “While these authors [i.e., Jan Grabowski and Barbara Engelking] blame anti-Semitism and greed for lucre for causing Poles to join in the hunt for Jews, Brewing attributes a causative role to the occupation authorities' efforts to use Polish peasants to fight all forms of resistance. In his opinion, several factors stood behind this ‘cooperation’ with the occupier: submission to repeated calls from the Nazi authorities, the use of coercion, rewards offered for denouncing hidden Jews, and fear of punishment for failing to follow the occupier's orders.”

Piotr Gontarczyk criticized the work for excluding most works of local historians and selective presentation of facts. He criticized poor standards in source referencing, noting that the work often "lacks a footnote with the page number where the quotation in question can be found" and "bibliographic details are missing in many other instances". He writes that in a number of instances, "testimonies of Holocaust victims are distorted in [the book]". He also noted a number of inconsistencies between Polish and English editions of the book. He concludes that the books aim is to "tarnish the image of the Catholic Church and peasants" which according to Gontarczyk "fits in with the stereotypical prejudices that are quite frequent in the English-speaking world", that "the history of Dąbrowa Tarnowska County, as presented in Judenjagd, has little in common with its actual history"; finally closing his review by writing that "the treatment of all fundamental aspects of a scholarly publication such as archival research, the selection and analysis of sources, and especially the widespread use of completely unacceptable methods of constructing a narrative and treating his-torical sources, excludes Judenjagd from any serious form of scholarly discourse".

=== German-language reviews ===
Yad Vashem historian Witold Mędykowski reviewed Judenjagd by Grabowski, It Was Such a Beautiful Sunny Day by Barbara Engelking, and Golden Harvest by Jan T. Gross. Mędykowski notes that Grabowski concentrates on a specific geographical area in attempting to trace the fates of Jews, which Mędykowski thinks is important as it permits statistical analysis of a demarcated set of persons. Mędykowski writes that a heated debate has taken place in Polish historiography about the rescuing of Jews, but that both sides have relied not on statistical analysis but on illustrative examples that are easily manipulated. Mędykowski writes that this debate has been ongoing for decades despite the limited validity of casting the Poles in a positive light. According to Mędykowski, being a victim of Nazi occupation does not exclude complicity in the deaths of Jews. Mędykowski writes that historian Bogdan Musial, who according to Mędykowski is a native of Dąbrowa Tarnowska County, responded harshly to the book, which provides a different picture than that conveyed in his parents' home. Mędykowski writes that Holocaust survivors Shevah Weiss and Samuel Willenberg confirm the negative attitudes toward Jews, which are well known to historians involved in Holocaust research. Mędykowski concludes that a "shock therapy" to demolish myths about the rescuing of Jews is due.

Jagiellonian University associate professor Piotr Weiser reviewed Hunt for the Jews by Grabowski, It Was Such a Beautiful Sunny Day by Barbara Engelking, and Golden Harvest by Jan T. Gross. Weiser writes that the Polish debate on the Holocaust seldom went beyond a simple dichotomy – the Jews, of course, suffered unspeakably, but the Poles no less. Weiser contrasts Grabowski and Engelking with Gross, saying the former employ a strictly scientific approaching writing monographs, not essays. Weiser describes Grabowski's approach as positivist, taking the seat of a neutral observer, and notes that Grabowski's ability to read German sources is rare among young Polish researchers, understanding what Jean Améry called the logic of annihilation, describing how the Germans rewarded antisemitism. Weiser concludes by saying that all three texts are important contributions to a counter-narrative that rivals the heroization of Poles in the context of the Holocaust.

Ingo Loose reviewed Grabowski's Hunt for the Jews, Barbara Engelking's It Was Such a Beautiful Sunny Day, and Jan T. Gross's Golden Harvest. Loose wrote that all three works relate to the open wound of Polish-Jewish relations during the Holocaust, a very sensitive point in Polish historical memory. Loose wrote that Grabowski's study is excellently written and more coherently structured than Gross's work. According to Loose, Grabowski's pars pro toto study illustrates a theme whose tragic significance was pointed out by Emanuel Ringelblum and emphasizes the effectiveness of the Germans' use of menace and rewards to persuade Poles to give up hidden Jews. Loose wrote that this aspect had previously been dismissed or marginalized, but that Grabowski's study showed it to have involved tens of thousands of escaped Jews. Loose noted that Polish critics have accused Grabowski of underestimating the Germans' intimidation campaign; however, Loose writes that, while it is true that hiding Jews was punishable with death, this was too often used in political debate in lieu of drawing a more complex picture of German-Polish cooperation or neutrality regarding Jews. Loose concluded that "Jewish property" and "German-Polish cooperation" are two fields with ample room for future research into a more complex model of the German occupation in the General Government.

Historian Grzegorz Rossoliński-Liebe, writing in H-Soz-Kult, reviewed three books: Judenjagd by Grabowski, It Was Such a Beautiful Sunny Day by Barbara Engelking, and Golden Harvest by Jan T. Gross. He wrote that all three studies are noteworthy explorations of the Polish participation in the Holocaust, challenging both the German tendency to neglect non-German perpetrators and the Polish perspective of viewing Poles solely as victims. According to Rossoliński-Liebe, Grabowski demonstrates that a broad spectrum of Polish society took part in Judenjagd (hunts for the Jews). But Rossoliński-Liebe wrote that he did not think these 2011 works would trigger a new Holocaust debate, as had occurred following Gross's Neighbors: The Destruction of the Jewish Community in Jedwabne, Poland, a decade prior.

== See also ==
- Night Without End (Dalej jest noc)
- Such a Beautiful Sunny Day: Jews Seeking Refuge in the Polish Countryside, 1942–1945
