= Holocaust Studies and Materials =

Polish academic journal

- Editor-in-Chief: Dariusz Libionka
- Categories: history
- Frequency: annual - Polish edition English edition every two or three years
- Format: B5
- Circulation: 1000
- Publisher: Association Polish Center for Holocaust Research
- Founded: 2003
- Company: Polish Center for Holocaust Research
- Country: Poland
- Based in: Warsaw
- Language: Polish and English
- Website: www.zagladazydow.pl/index.php/zz
- ISSN: 1895-247X

Zagłada Żydów. Studia i Materiały (English: Holocaust. Studies and Materials) is a Polish academic journal published yearly by a group of historians and researchers from the Polish Center for Holocaust Research created in 2003 in Warsaw. It is an annual devoted to the topics connected with the broadly understood Holocaust research. The target audience could include academics dealing with the Holocaust, but also college and university students, as well as broader public interested in this topic. Each volume forms individual and self-contained monograph. Authors of the articles represent various generations and scholarly approaches. The common characteristic is their frequent reevaluation of primary and secondary sources as well as the popular perception of truth. Important part of the journal consists of book reviews.

Since 2008 the biannual or triennial English language edition titled Holocaust Studies and Materials is also being published. Editorial board includes Dariusz Libionka (editor-in-chief), Barbara Engelking, Jacek Leociak, Jan Grabowski, and Agnieszka Haska. The managing editor is Jakub Petelewicz.

The work is divided into nine sections, as follows: Studies, Profiles, Materials, From the research workshops, Points of view, Book Reviews, Events, Curiosa, and Letters.

Historian Samuel Kassow states that the journal is "one of the world’s most important organs of Holocaust scholarship".
