= Bogdan Musiał =

Polish-German historian

- Born: 1960 (age 65–66)
- Occupations: Historian, author
- Writing career
- Notable work: Sowjetische Partisanen. Mythos und Wirklichkeit (2009)

Bogdan Musiał (born 1960 in Poland) is a Polish-German historian. In 1985 he left Poland and became a political refugee in Germany, where he obtained German citizenship. In 2010 he returned to Poland and became a professor at the Cardinal Stefan Wyszyński University in Warsaw.

Musiał specializes in World War II history.

== Career ==
Bogdan Musiał was born in 1960 in Wielopole, Dąbrowa County, Poland. He worked in Silesian mines and worked with the Polish Solidarność movement. On account of the latter involvement, he was persecuted by state security and in 1985 sought and received political asylum in the Federal Republic of Germany; in 1992 he was naturalized. He worked as a mechanic, and from 1990 to 1998 studied history, political science and sociology at the Leibniz University of Hannover and the University of Manchester. In 1998 he graduated with a thesis on the treatment of Jews in occupied Poland.

From 1991 to 1998, Musiał received a scholarship from Friedrich Ebert Foundation. During that time he was one of the main critics of the Wehrmachtsausstellung exhibition compiled by the Hamburg Institute for Social Research, which eventually had to be seriously revised before reopening to conform with his findings.

Since 1998 he served as scientific researcher at the German Historical Institute in Warsaw where he has studied previously inaccessible sources about crimes of the Soviet NKVD, during the Soviet retreat in 1941 which escalated violence.

He habilitated in 2005. In 2008 he published the book Kampfplatz Deutschland. 2010–2015 he lived in Poland and worked at the Cardinal Stefan Wyszyński University in Warsaw.

== Lustration activities ==
In 2007 Musiał wrote in the Frankfurter Allgemeine Zeitung that Zygmunt Bauman was a former agent for Poland's Urzad Bezpieczenstwa (communist secret police) between 1945 and 1953 and had participated in political cleansing of opponents. Bauman responded that he would not dignify Musiał with an answer as "I don't want to give weight or importance to something which is [composed of] half-truths and 100% lies. What is true in his article is not new, because everybody knew I was a communist." Prior research by Piotr Gontarczyk showed that Bauman had indeed been a political officer and a secret informant of the communist authorities and had received awards from the communist government for fighting Polish democratic and independence movements.

In 2008 Musiał published a controversial article in Rzeczpospolita alleging that the father of Polish historian Włodzimierz Borodziej—who had advocated for new research into the flight and expulsion of Germans from Poland during and after World War II—had been an officer in the Służba Bezpieczeństwa and had arranged for Borodziej's position on the German-Polish Textbook Commission, which per Musiał tarnished Borodziej's credibility as a historian.

Musiał criticized the Polish Foreign Ministry for recommending the book Inferno of Choices: Poles and the Holocaust, as an advancing a ""pedagogy of shame", that may have an irreparable effect on the Polish image abroad. He has also criticized the Aftermath film based on the events in the Jedwabne pogrom and its director Władysław Pasikowski, saying that countries outside of Poland would not put up with similar disdain.

== Views ==
Musial supports demanding war reparations from Germany for destruction and loss of life Poland endured from Nazi Germany which he views as unpaid (Germany claims the Treaty on the Final Settlement with Respect to Germany waived such claims).

According to Musiał Hunt for the Jews by Jan Grabowski failed to examine material that contradicted Grabowski's thesis, including Polish witness statements, German statements, and archives of the Polish resistance. Musial argued that the book underestimates the number of Jewish survivors while inflating the number of complicit Poles, and that statements made by Poles are criticized while those of Jewish witnesses are not.

== Reviews ==
Yehuda Bauer reviewed Musiał's Sowjetische Partisanen: Mythos und Wirklichkeit, 1941–1944, calling it "a most important contribution" to the history of the war, the Soviet partisans, and Polish-Jewish partisan relations in Belorussia. Karel Berkhoff stated that the book will likely remain a comprehensive description of partisan warfare in Belarus due to its large source base. Berkhoff highlighted the book's key finding that the Soviet Partisans acted "more or less independently from Moscow", and were never fully controlled by the NKVD. As a result, in the zones controlled by the Soviet partisans, they frequently robbed the local peasants, attacked Jews, assaulted women, beat and killed locals and on some occasions destroyed entire villages.

Professor Zdzisław Winnicki reviewed Musial's book on Soviet partisans, calling it an "impressive and pioneering work", with "incredibly valuable assessments" about the combat effectiveness of Soviet partisan units and their infiltration by the NKVD. Winnicki concludes that Musial's work is a mature, objective study that helps us understand not only past events but also current views and attitudes in Belarus.

Per Anders Rudling, reviewed "Konterrevolutionäre Elemente sind zu erschießen": Die Brutalisieung des deutsch-sowjetischen Krieges im Sommer 1941. ("Counter-revolutionary Elements are to be Shot": The Brutalization of the German-Soviet War in the summer of 1941). He noted that Musiał predicted in his introduction that "German liberal intellectuals are not going to like his book for political reasons" because "the sensitiveness surrounding the subject of the Holocaust and the National Socialist past has often worked as a block to a scholarly approach to the subject". Musiał places responsibility for the outbreak of World War II both on Germany and on the Soviet Union. According to Rudling Musiał makes use of "controversial statistics, aimed at pointing out that Poles were singled out and subjected to uniquely harsh terror under Stalin". Rudling concludes by saying that "By focusing on these tragic events, the book has stirred up a debate. Wolfram Wette wrote that the book is full of contradictions and confuses perpetrators and victims. According to Wette the parts of the books describing the Soviet occupation of Eastern Poland contain interesting information, however Musiał's assertion that "Between 1939 and 1941 ... Soviet terror in eastern Poland was comparable to Nazi terror in German-occupied Poland, if not worse." anticipates his findings that are affected by a "specifically Polish anti-Sovietism" attitude.

Alexander B. Rossino states that Musiał's research is detailed and has resulted in a more nuanced understanding of Jewish involvement with Soviet occupation forces. Rossino underlines that while Musiał has been criticized for claiming that Jews in eastern Poland were over represented in Soviet institutions, examination of witness reports discovered in many cases Jewish militia members directly participated in mass arrests and deportation actions. Rossino writes that other scholars of the final solution in the occupied Soviet Union have corroborated Musiał's findings. He names among them Yitzhak Arad who wrote that Jews played a relatively large role in the Communist Party that was behind actions in occupied Poland. Other scholars include Dov Levin who wrote "the labeling of the Soviet administration as a 'Jewish regime' became widespread when Jewish militiamen helped NKVD agents send local Poles into exile". Rossino names also Jan Gross who according to him wrote in 1983 that "Jewish collaboration" with the Soviet authorities was behind the sudden upsurge of anti-Semitism among the non-Jewish population in eastern Poland.

== Bibliography ==
- "Aktion Reinhardt". Der Völkermord an den Juden im Generalgouvernement 1941-1944 (The Origins of "Operation Reinhard": The Decision-Making Process for the Mass Murder of the Jews in the General Government) Osnabrück 2004
- Sowjetische Partisanen in Weißrußland. Innenansichten aus dem Gebiet Baranovici 1941–1944. Eine Dokumentation (Soviets partisans in Belarus). Oldenbourg Verlag, München 2004, ISBN 3-486-64588-9.
- The Origins of 'Operation Reinhard': The Decision-Making Process for the Mass Murder of the Jews in the Generalgouvernment. Yad Vashem Studies 28 (2000): 113–153.
- Deutsche Zivilverwaltung und Judenverfolgung im Generalgouvernement. Eine Fallstudie zum Distrikt Lublin 1939–1944. Harrassowitz Verlag, Wiesbaden 1999, ISBN 3-447-04208-7.
- Kampfplatz Deutschland, Stalins Kriegspläne gegen den Westen (Battle-ground Germany, Stalin's plans of war against the West). Propyläen, Berlin 2008, ISBN 978-3-549-07335-3.
- Sowjetische Partisanen 1941–1944: Mythos und Wirklichkeit (Soviet partisans. Myth and Reality), Paderborn: Ferdinand Schöningh Verlag, 2009; 592 pages. ISBN 978-3-506-76687-8.
- "Stalins Beutezug. Die Plünderung Deutschlands und der Aufstieg der Sowjetunion zur Weltmacht" (Stalin's plundering raid. The plundering of Germany and the rise of the Soviet Union to a Superpower), Propyläen, Berlin 2010. ISBN 978-3-549-07370-4. To be published in an English translation as Stalin's Great Raid: The plundering of Germany and the rise of the Soviet Union to a superpower (2026, Foundation Publishing, ISBN 9781945649738).
- Kto dopomoże Żydowi... (Who helps a Jew ...) Zysk, Poznań, 2019
