= Engelking =

Engelking is a surname. Notable people with the surname include:

- Barbara Engelking (born 1962), Polish sociologist
- Janie Ward-Engelking, American politician
- Leszek Engelking (born 1955), Polish poet, critic, and translator
- Ryszard Engelking (1935–2023), Polish mathematician
