= Polish Center for Holocaust Research =

Institution of holocaust research in Poland

Polish Centre for Holocaust Research
- Centrum Badań nad Zagładą Żydów
- Formation: 2003; 23 years ago
- Founder: Henryk Domański
- Founded at: Polish Academy of Sciences
- Headquarters: Staszic Palace, New World Street
- Location: Warsaw, Poland
- Diretcor: Barbara Engelking
- Member: Jacek Leociak
- Member: Dariusz Libionka
- Publication: Holocaust Studies and Materials
- Subsidiaries: Association of the Polish Centre for Holocaust Research
- Website: holocaustresearch.pl

The Polish Centre for Holocaust Research (Polish: Centrum Badań nad Zagładą Żydów) is an academic and research center at the Polish Academy of Sciences in Warsaw, Poland. The center's director is Barbara Engelking.

== History ==
The Polish Centre for Holocaust Research, created in 2003, is an interdisciplinary research facility devoted to studying the Holocaust in historical perspective. The centre brings together psychologists, sociologists, literary historians, cultural anthropologists, and other scholars in order to provide knowledge on the nature, scope, and effects of the Holocaust. In 2007, to support and expand the centre's activities, the Association of the Polish Centre for Holocaust Research was created.

The centre coordinates research and educational projects, grants, seminars, conferences, and workshops, and publishes books and papers by Polish scholars as well as translations of works in other languages. Since 2005, the centre has published an academic journal, Holocaust Studies and Materials.

In February 2018, Jakub Petelewicz, speaking as academic secretary of the Polish Centre for Holocaust Research, expressed concern that the 2018 Polish law criminalizing discussion of negative Polish actions in the Holocaust may hinder the work of Poland-based academics and institutions. While the law contains an exemption for academic and artistic work, he said the lack of definitions could lead to confusion. For instance, he expressed concern that presenting materials to schools and discussing findings publicly might be prevented. Another concern he raised was the possibility of being sued personally or as an institution by right-wing groups under provisions of the law allowing for lawsuits to defend "the good name of the Polish nation." Petelwicz described the overall effect of the law as pressuring academics to play down negative actions by Poles and emphasize suffering by Poles.

== Reception ==
Writing in the European Review, Kornelia Kończal has said that "[the Centre] has produced an impressive body of innovative studies dealing with the history of the Second World War in Poland. Most of the studies have been highly appreciated by the international academic community and largely ignored by the Polish readership." Michael Whine stated that "its scholars have completely rewritten the historiography of the destruction of Polish Jewry" and that the centre had been attacked by "Poland’s nationalist government, which does not look kindly on the scholars who have exposed many examples of local cooperation with the Germans in the destruction and despoliation of Polish Jews". German historian Dieter Pohl described the centre as eminent and praised its "most innovative historiography".

Marta Kurkowska-Budzan and Marcin Stasiak state that the centre's work has "contributed vastly to World War II historiography" but has had less of an impact on the methodology of contemporary Polish history in general. Historian Havi Dreifuss states that the centre's researchers "demonstrate that treachery and harm to Jews—due to a variety of motives—existed throughout occupied Poland, for long years and on a large geographical scale. A whole new set of questions are opened by the perception that among the Jews who tried to flee, most of the victims fell due to considerable Polish involvement—whether by apprehension and extradition to the Germans, or by outright murder—and not merely because of German traps."

David Engel criticizes what he called the self-assumed "national mission" to help the Polish people confront some of their alleged atrocious deeds and become "more mature", in lieu of their "whining self-image of victims". Engel writes that that is not the role of historians, who rather should pursue objective, scholarly research in the interest of broad academic and international discourse.

== Night Without End ==
In 2018 the centre released a Polish-language study, Dalej jest noc, translated as Night Without End: The Fate of Jews in Selected Counties of Occupied Poland (2022), co-edited by Jan Grabowski and Barbara Engelking, and co-authored with seven other centre members. The 1,600-page, two-volume study covers nine counties in Nazi-occupied Poland out of 63. The study identified small Polish towns as particularly dangerous, or "death traps", for Jews in hiding. Historian Jacek Chrobaczyński notes that all nine studies in the study were prepared with the same methodology and style and highlights the study's importance in deconstructing political myths and propaganda partially present in Polish society.

== 2019 Paris Conference ==
In February 2019, the centre co-organized the New Polish School of Holocaust Scholarship in Paris. The conference was disrupted by Polish nationalists. The Polish Institute of National Remembrance (IPN), which had made social media postings during the conference and sent a delegate, was criticized by French higher education minister Frédérique Vidal, who said the disturbances were "highly regrettable" and "anti-Semitic". Vidal further stated the disturbances organized by Gazeta Polska activists, appeared to have been condoned by the IPN whose representative did not condemn the disruption and which criticized the conference on social media that were further re-tweeted by the Embassy of Poland, Paris. Polish Minister of General and Higher Education Jarosław Gowin issued a statement saying that he could not identify in the transcripts provided any antisemitic attacks.

The Fondation pour la Mémoire de la Shoah, Human rights ambassador François Croquette, and the International Holocaust Remembrance Alliance released statements critical of the disruption.
