= Zagłada Żydów =

Zagłada Żydów may refer to:

- The Holocaust (Polish: Zagłada Żydów), the genocide of European Jews by Nazi Germany
  - The Holocaust in Poland
- Holocaust Studies and Materials (Polish: Zagłada Żydów. Studia i Materiały), a historical journal on the history of the Holocaust
