= Night Without End =

Night Without End may refer to:

- Night Without End (history book)
- Night Without End (novel)
