= Polish League =

Polish League may refer to:

- Polish League Against Defamation, a right-wing nationalist non-governmental organization founded in 2013
- Polish League Cup (1999–2002), a football competition
- Polish League Cup (1977–1978), a football competition
- Polish Basketball League, founded in 1995
- Polish Volleyball League (PlusLiga), founded in 2000

== See also ==
- National League (Poland, 1893), a Polish right-wing political organisation that disbanded in 1928
- National League (Poland, 2007), a Polish far-right minor political party
