= Ryszard Engelking =

Polish mathematician (1935–2023)

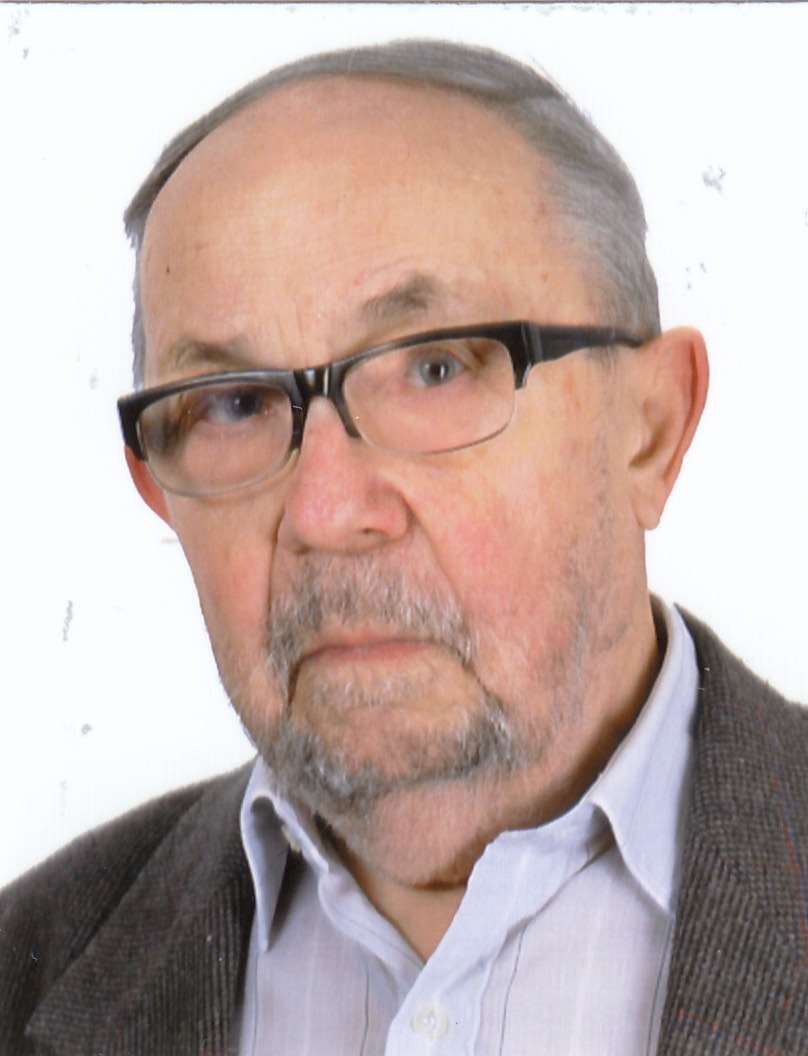
Engelking in 2014

Ryszard Engelking (16 November 1935 – 16 November 2023) was a Polish mathematician. He was working mainly on general topology and dimension theory. He is the author of several influential monographs in this field. The 1989 edition of his General Topology is nowadays a standard reference for topology. Engelking died on 16 November 2023, his 88th birthday.

== Scientific work ==
Apart from his books, Ryszard Engelking is known, among other things, for a generalization to an arbitrary topological space of the "Alexandroff double circle", for works on completely metrizable spaces, suborderable spaces and generalized ordered spaces. The Engelking–Karlowicz theorem, proved together with Monica Karlowicz, is a statement about the existence of a family of functions from $2^ \mu$ to $\mu$ with topological and set-theoretical applications.

== Books ==
Engelking's books include:

- R. Engelking (1968). Outline of General Topology. translated from Polish. North-Holland, Amsterdam.
- R. Engelking (1977). General Topology. PWN, Warsaw.
- R. Engelking (1978). Dimension Theory. North-Holland, Amsterdam.
- R. Engelking (1989). General Topology. Revised and completed edition. Heldermann Verlag, Berlin. ISBN 3-88538-006-4.
- R. Engelking (1995). Theory of Dimensions: Finite and Infinite. Heldermann Verlag, Berlin. ISBN 3-88538-010-2.

== Personalia ==
The Polish sociologist Barbara Engelking is a daughter of Ryszard Engelking.
