= Polish League Against Defamation =

Polish right-wing nationalist organization

Good Name Redoubt – Polish League Against Defamation
- Reduta Dobrego Imienia - Polska Liga Przeciw Zniesławieniom
- Reduta Dobrego Imienia (logo)
- Formation: November 2012
- Type: Public relations
- Headquarters: Warsaw, Poland
- Key people: Maciej Świrski (Initiator and President)
- Website: rdi-plad.org, rdi.org.pl

The Polish League Against Defamation (Polish: Fundacja Reduta Dobrego Imienia – Polska Liga Przeciw Zniesławieniom, lit. 'Good Name Redoubt – Polish League Against Defamation') is a right-wing nationalist non-governmental organization based in Warsaw, Poland. It was founded in 2013 by Maciej Świrski. Critics of the organization argue that its aggressive tactics have the opposite of the intended effect.

== Aims and objectives ==
The stated objectives of the League are to defend the name of Poland and the Polish people against acts of vilification in the international media or historical misrepresentation in the world of politics. For instance, on the 75th anniversary of the Soviet invasion of Poland in 2014, the League staged a protest in front of the Russian Embassy in Warsaw against the Russian government's denial of responsibility for the atrocities committed by the Soviet Union in occupied Poland. The protest was attended by several hundred people including civil rights organizations such as Euromaidan from Ukraine and Solidarność Walcząca. According to the League's founder Maciej Świrski, the League acts through lobbying, publishing ads, open letters as well as articles which emphasize Poland's role in fighting against Nazi Germany during World War II.

The Daily Telegraph, The Times of Israel, The Jewish Chronicle, and The Jerusalem Post have described the organization as "nationalist". According to Amnesty International's Poland researcher Barbora Černušáková, it is a "nationalist organization close to Poland’s government". Index on Censorship, has described the organization as a "campaign group close to the ruling Polish party", as did The Guardian. The Jewish Telegraphic Agency described the League as a "right-wing Polish group". According to Haaretz it is an "independent organization considered close to Poland’s right-wing, nationalist government". Argentine newspaper Pagina/12 called the League "a far-right organization".

== Activities ==
=== Petitions ===
Following the international release of the 2013 Polish film Ida, the league called for the film to carry title cards stating that Poland was under German occupation during the events depicted. More than 40,000 people signed a petition organized by the league criticizing Ida's supposed inaccuracies and anti-Polish bias. The film's director called the demands "absurd", "too silly to comment on", and "a stream of hatred from the rightist Polish media".

The League collected tens of thousands of signatures in order to pass the Amendment to the Act on the Institute of National Remembrance, which has been criticized by historians as an attempt to silence discussion of Polish complicity in wartime atrocities. Świrski, who heads the league, was instrumental in passing the bill and was possibly the only person consulted prior to the law being presented to parliament by the Justice ministry.

=== Lawsuits ===
Maciej Świrski brought a lawsuit against Newsweek.pl for a 2017 article in which it referred to the Zgoda concentration camp, operated by Polish authorities after World War II, as a "Polish concentration camp". In 2018, a court ruled in his favor and Newsweek.pl had to publish an apology stating that there was no such thing as Polish concentration camps. Verfassungsblog described the case as a "highly problematic" precedent which goes against the European Court of Human Rights verdict in Perinçek v. Switzerland (2013) that attempts to enshrine a particular version of history into law and punish those who dissent violate freedom of speech rights guaranteed in Article 10 of the European Convention on Human Rights.

In 2018, Polish Holocaust scholar Jan Grabowski sued the organization for libel after it accused him of "falsif[ying] the history of Poland" and "proclaiming the thesis that Poles are complicit in the extermination of Jews" in an open letter. The case, originally scheduled to be heard in May 2020, was postponed due to the COVID-19 pandemic.

In 2019 the league funded a lawsuit against Grabowski and Barbara Engelking, editors of the 2018 Dalej jest noc ("Night Without End"), accusing them of defamation. The court ruled in their favor, but was later overruled in an appeal.

=== "Internet hussars" ===
The League received 280,000 PLN from the Polish Ministry of Foreign Affairs in order to create an internet system and recruit "Internet hussars" to report and take action on alleged anti-Polish statements in foreign media.

=== Reports ===
In 2020, the organization released a 74-page report titled "Opportunities to Prevent Defamation on Netflix-type Streaming Platforms" in which it examined 557 fiction works and 47 documentaries for "anti-Polish" content. The report states that "Polish honey is presented as a ‘villain'" in the documentary series Rotten, which briefly mentions antibiotics in Polish honey.
