= Jan Grabowski =

Polish-Canadian historian (born 1962)

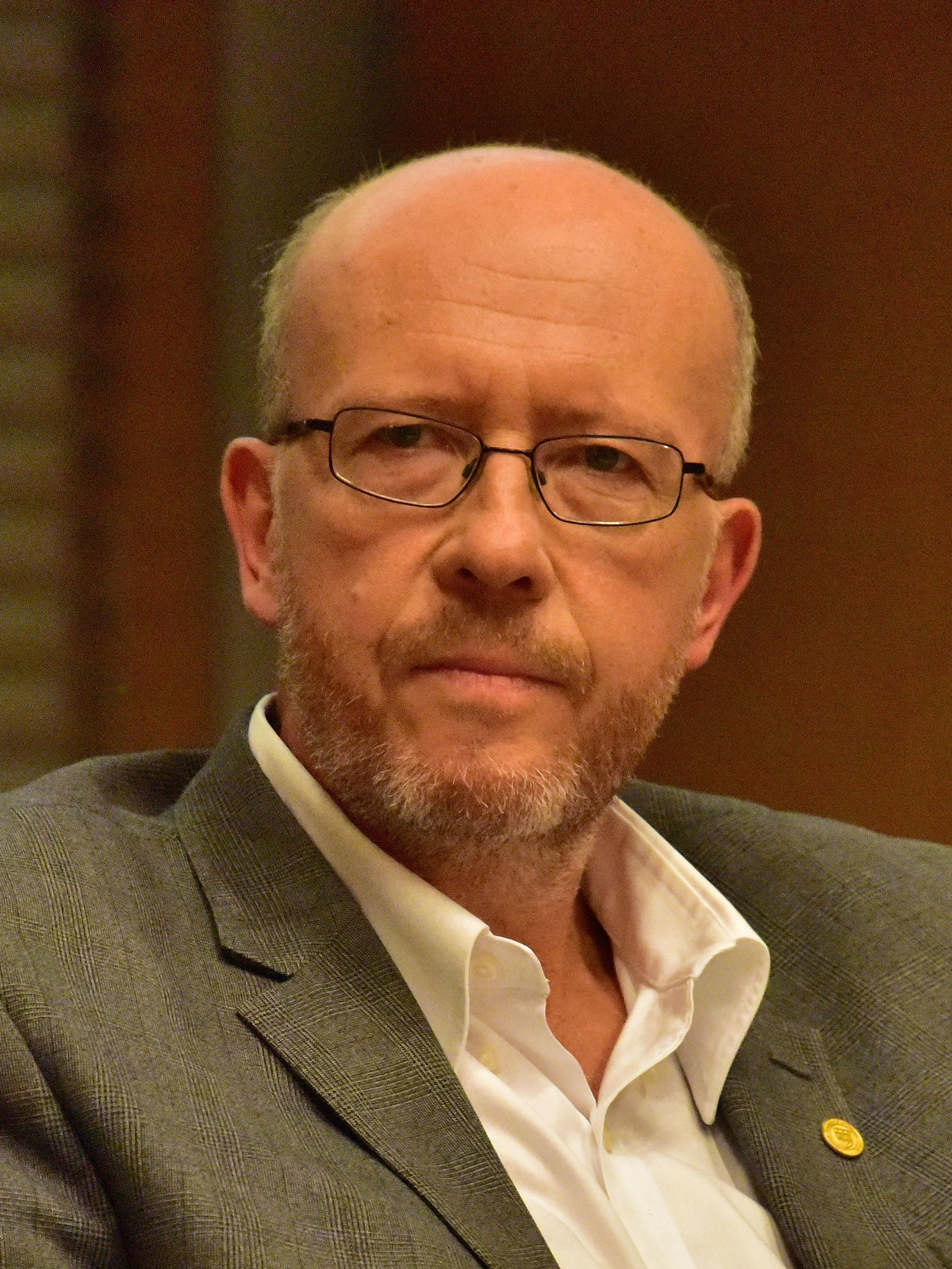
- Grabowski in 2018
- Born: 24 June 1962 (age 64); Warsaw, Poland
- Occupation: Historian
- Awards: Yad Vashem International Book Prize for Holocaust Research

Academic background
- Education: University of Warsaw (MA); Université de Montréal (PhD)
- Thesis: The Common Ground. Settled Natives and French in Montréal 1667–1760 (1993)

Academic work
- Era: The Holocaust in Poland; 1939–1945 Polish–Jewish relations
- Institutions: University of Ottawa
- Notable works: Hunt for the Jews: Betrayal and Murder in German-Occupied Poland (2013)
- Website: Homepage, University of Ottawa

Jan Zbigniew Grabowski (born June 24, 1962) is a Polish-Canadian professor of history at the University of Ottawa, specializing in Jewish–Polish relations in German-occupied Poland during World War II and the Holocaust in Poland.

Grabowski co-founded the Polish Center for Holocaust Research in Warsaw, Poland, in 2003. He is best known for his book Hunt for the Jews: Betrayal and Murder in German-Occupied Poland (2013), which won the Yad Vashem International Book Prize.

== Early life and education ==
Grabowski was born in Warsaw to a Roman Catholic mother and Jewish father. His father, Zbigniew Ryszard Grabowski né Abrahamer, a Holocaust survivor and chemistry professor from Kraków, fought in the 1944 Warsaw Uprising.

While at the University of Warsaw, Grabowski was active in the Independent Students' Union between 1981 and 1985, where he helped to run an underground printing press for the Solidarity movement. He received his M.A. in 1986, and in 1988 he emigrated to Canada after travel restrictions had been eased by Poland's communist government. If he had known the regime would fall a year later, he would have stayed, he told an interviewer: "When I left in 1988 I thought there was no future for any young person in Poland. It felt like you were looking at the world through a thick wall of glass. It was sort of an un-reality ... the rules were oblique, strange, inhuman even. Then after one year the system seemed to collapse like a house of cards." He received his Ph.D. from the Université de Montréal in 1994 for a thesis entitled The Common Ground. Settled Natives and French in Montréal 1667–1760.

== Academic appointments ==
Grabowski became a faculty member at the University of Ottawa in 1993. In 2016–17 he was an Ina Levine Invitational Scholar at the United States Holocaust Memorial Museum, where he conducted research into the Blue Police for a project entitled "Polish 'Blue' Police, Bystanders, and the Holocaust in Occupied Poland, 1939–1945". He received a grant for the project (2016–2020) from the Canadian Social Sciences and Humanities Research Council.

== Research ==
=== Hunt for the Jews ===
Grabowski is best known for his book Hunt for the Jews, first published in Poland in 2011 as Judenjagd: Polowanie na Żydów 1942–1945. In 2013 a revised and updated edition was published by Indiana University Press as Hunt for the Jews: Betrayal and Murder in German-Occupied Poland, and in 2016 a revised and expanded edition was published in Hebrew by Yad Vashem.

Awarded the Yad Vashem International Book Prize in 2014, the book describes the Judenjagd (German: "Jew hunt") from 1942 onwards, focusing on Dąbrowa Tarnowska County, a rural area in southeastern Poland. The Judenjagd was the German search for Jews who had escaped from the liquidated ghettos in Poland and were trying to hide among the non-Jewish population. Grabowski relied on Polish court records from the 1940s, post-war testimony collected by the Central Committee of Polish Jews, and records gathered in Germany during investigations in the 1960s. In a 2015 interview, he described the mechanics of the "hunt":

The German policy was based on terror. Poles faced the death penalty for any help they gave to Jews. Also, the Germans created a so-called "hostage" system among the Poles. In every community they designated people who would be rotated every couple of weeks. They were responsible for informing the Polish police, or the Germans, about Jews hiding in their towns. If a Jew was discovered that had not been reported, the so-called hostages would be harshly punished. So everyone was highly motivated to get rid of the Jews.

According to Grabowski, most Jews in hiding were given up by local people to the Blue Police or directly to the Germans. He said that Poles were "directly or indirectly" responsible for most of the deaths of over 200,000 Jews, not counting victims of the police; he explained that by "most", it could be 60 percent or as high as 90 percent. (Note: "From among the approximately 250,000 Polish Jews who had escaped liquidations of the ghettos and who had fled, about 40,000 survived. We have thus more than 200,000 Jews who fled the liquidations and who did not survive until liberation. My findings show that in the overwhelming majority of cases, their Polish co-citizens were – directly through murder, or indirectly by denunciation – at the root of their deaths." "So –... 200,000 Jews were murdered while hiding on the Aryan side?" – "Yes, and based on detailed analysis of the circumstances in which they perished, I formulated a research hypothesis that the majority – though at this stage of research I am not able to say whether it was 60 or 90 percent – lost their lives at the hands of Poles or with their complicity." (Original: "A więc –... ok. 200 tys. Żydów zostało zamordowanych, gdy się ukrywali po aryjskiej stronie?" – "Tak, i na podstawie szczegółowej analizy tego, w jakich okolicznościach ginęli, sformułowałem hipotezę badawczą, że większość – choć nie jestem na tym etapie badań w stanie powiedzieć, czy było to 60, czy 90 proc. – straciła życie z rąk Polaków albo przy ich współudziale."))

The book sparked a heated public debate in Poland.

=== The Polish Police ===
Grabowski's book The Polish Police: Collaboration in the Holocaust (2017), published by the United States Holocaust Memorial Museum, is based on his 2016 Ina Levine Annual Lecture on the Blue Police.

=== Dalej jest noc ===
In 2018, Grabowski and Barbara Engelking co-edited a two-volume study, Dalej jest noc: losy Żydów w wybranych powiatach okupowanej Polski (Night without End: The Fates of Jews in Selected Counties of Occupied Poland). Published by the Polish Center for Holocaust Research, the study focused on nine counties in German-occupied Poland during the Holocaust, giving a detailed account of the fate of the area's Jews and of the question of Polish collaboration with the German occupiers. Grabowski contributed a chapter on Węgrów County. He told a newspaper that the work "talks about Polish virtue just as much. It paints a truthful picture."

Mark Weitzman, director of government affairs for the Simon Wiesenthal Center, said it was "meticulously researched and sourced". Polish historian Jacek Chrobaczyński commended its authors for deconstructing political myths that persist in Polish history, journalism, church, and politics. However, scholars associated with Poland's Institute of National Remembrance alleged that the study used unreliable sources, selectively treated witness statements, presented rumor as fact, and underestimated the draconian nature of the German occupation.

==== Litigation ====
The Polish League Against Defamation, a group whose stated aim is to protect "Poland's good name", funded a civil case against Grabowski and Engelking in Poland, brought by the 81-year-old niece of a Polish villager who was accused in the book by witness testimony of having betrayed Jews to the Germans. In February 2021, a Warsaw court ruled that Grabowski and Engelking would apologize for their claims about the villager, but it did not order them to pay compensation.

In response to the court ruling, the POLIN Museum of the History of Polish Jews, Yad Vashem, and the Simon Wiesenthal Center released statements expressing their concerns about the ruling's effects on academic freedom and freedom of speech. The POLIN Museum stated that the suit had been "an attempt to frighten scholars away from publishing the results of their research out of fear of a lawsuit and the ensuing costly litigation."

In August 2021, an appeals court overturned the ruling against Grabowski and Engelking, arguing in favour of academic freedom.

=== Research regarding Wikipedia ===
In 2023, Grabowski and historian Shira Klein published an article in the Journal of Holocaust Research which stated that Wikipedia spread misinformation about the history of Jews in Poland due to the work of a small group of editors. Grabowski said,

As a historian, I was aware for a long time of various distortions of the history of the Holocaust on Wikipedia. What I found shocking, was the sheer scale of the phenomenon, its lasting character and the small number of individuals needed to distort the history of one of the greatest tragedies in the history of humanity.

A response to Grabowski and Klein's article, which argues that their main conclusions are misleading or false, was published by Piotr Konieczny in the journal Holocaust Studies in 2025.

== Views ==
=== Summary ===
In 2016, Grabowski published a paper criticizing what he called "the history policy of the Polish state", and arguing that "the state-sponsored version of history seeks to undo the findings of the last few decades and to forcibly introduce a sanitized, feel-good narrative". He has deplored plans for a monument to rescuers of Jews, to be located at Grzybowski Square, which was part of the wartime Warsaw Ghetto; he sees it as an attempt to inflate the role of the rescuers, whom he describes as a "desperate, hunted, tiny minority", the exception to the rule. The ghetto site should be dedicated, he argues, to Jewish suffering, not to Polish courage.

Poland's embassy in Ottawa criticized Grabowski in 2016 for "groundless opinions and accusations" after he wrote an article for Maclean's about Poland's controversial amendment to its Act on the Institute of National Remembrance. The amendment would have penalized, with imprisonment for up to three years, anyone defaming Poland by accusing it of complicity in the Holocaust, with exceptions for "freedom of research, discussion of history, and artistic activity".

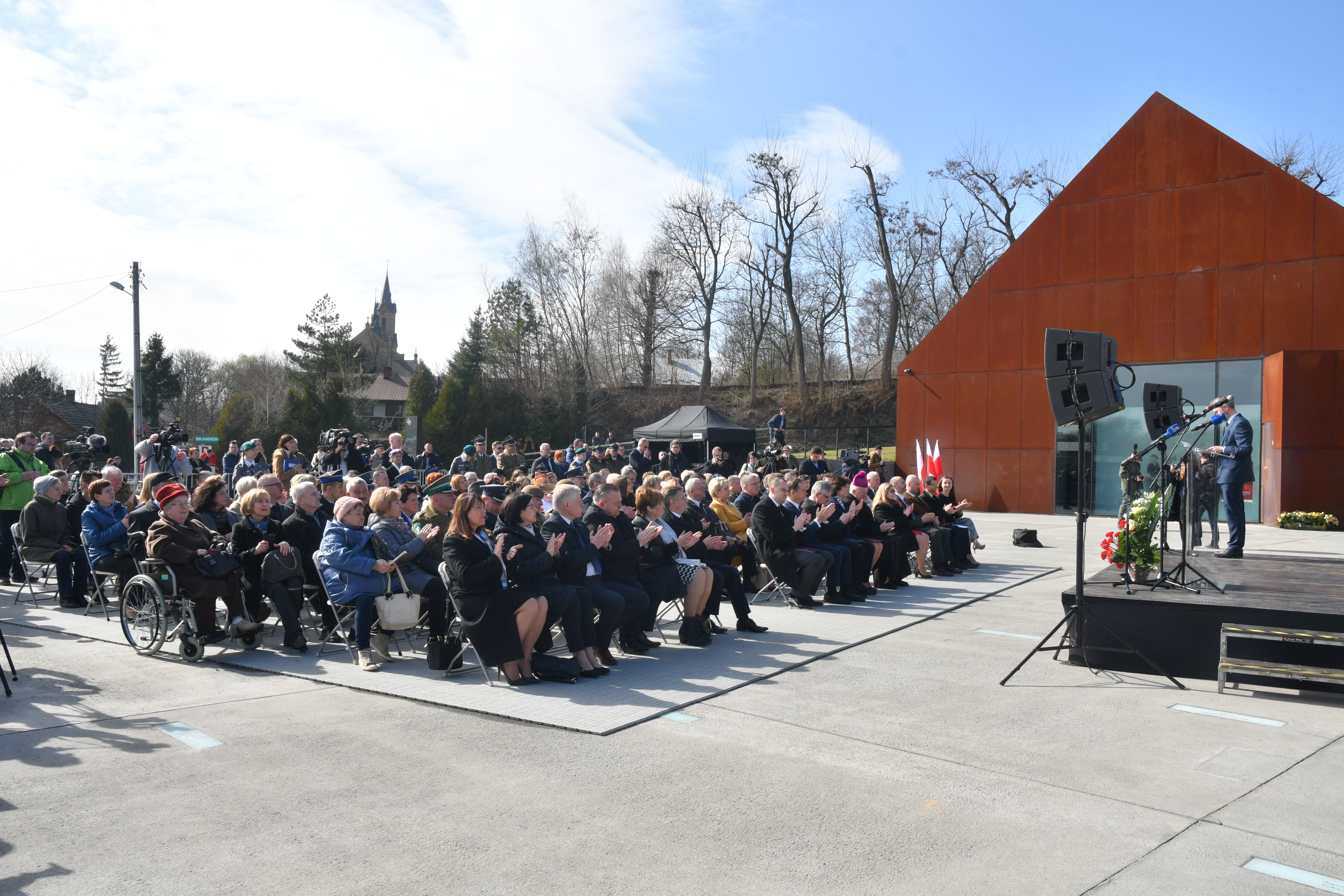
The Markowa Ulma-Family Museum of Poles Who Saved Jews in World War II, in Markowa, Poland, March 2019

In July 2017, Grabowski criticized the Ulma-Family Museum of Poles Who Saved Jews in World War II, which opened in Markowa in 2016. The garden will have plaques identifying the 1,500 towns in which the nearly 6,700 Poles lived who helped Jews and were recognized by Yad Vashem as Righteous Among the Nations. In Grabowski's view, the museum should provide more information about the Polish neighbours of the Ulma family and others who aided Jews.

Grabowski co-wrote a Haaretz opinion piece in December 2018 criticizing Israeli historian Daniel Blatman, professor of modern Jewish history and Holocaust studies at the Hebrew University of Jerusalem, for accepting the post of chief historian at the newly formed Warsaw Ghetto Museum in Warsaw, Poland, and thus agreeing to be "the poster boy of [Polish] state authorities bent on turning back the clock and distorting the history of the Holocaust". In January 2019 Blatman responded in Haaretz that, while scholars at the Center for Holocaust Research had provided valuable insights into involvement in the Holocaust by parts of the Polish population, they did not give due weight to the terror and violence perpetrated by the Germans against Poles under German occupation.

In 2022, Grabowski attended a conference "Hijacking Memory" about how right-wing actors have instrumentalized the Holocaust for political gain. He criticized the only Palestinian speaker Tareq Baconi and accused him of antisemitism after Baconi argued that the memory of the Holocaust should not justify violation of Palestinians' human rights.

=== Responses ===
Since publication of Hunt for the Jews, Grabowski has become subject to significant criticism in Poland, particularly from groups associated with Polish right-wing spectrum. Some of them attempted to have him fired from his academic position, and he has faced harassment and death threats, leading to increased security patrols in his department at the University of Ottawa.

On 7 June 2017, the Polish League Against Defamation (PLPZ) published a statement signed by about 130 Polish scholars — none of them historians of the Holocaust — protesting against Grabowski's research, which allegedly portrayed a "false and wrongful image of Poland and Polish people". In response, the Polish Center for Holocaust Research issued a statement of its own, entitled "In defence of Jan Grabowski's good name" — signed by seven of its members, including Barbara Engelking, Jacek Leociak and Dariusz Libionka, it called the criticism "as brutal as it is absurd". On 19 June 2017, about 180 historians of Holocaust and modern European history, including Christopher Browning, Mary Fulbrook, Deborah Lipstadt, Antony Polonsky, Dina Porat, Yitzhak Arad, and Robert Jan van Pelt, signed an open letter in Grabowski's defence, describing the campaign against Grabowski as "an attack on academic freedom and integrity", the letter emphasized that "[h]is scholarship [held] to the highest standards of academic research and publication", and that the PLPZ attempted to put forth a "distorted and whitewashed version of the history of Poland during the Holocaust era". In November 2018, Grabowski filed a defemation lawsuit in Warsaw against the PLPZ; he asked that each of their signatories buy a copy of Dalej jest noc and donate it to a Polish high school.

On 30 May 2023, a lecture by Grabowski at the German Historical Institute in Warsaw was cancelled after far-right MP Grzegorz Braun smashed Grabowski's microphone.

== Selected works ==
- (2001). Historia Kanady. Warsaw: Prószyński i S-ka. ISBN 978-8372550446 OCLC 169635941
- (2004). "Ja tego Żyda znam!": Szantażowanie Żydów w Warszawie 1939–1943. Warsaw: Wydaw. ISBN 978-8373880580 OCLC 937072035
- (2008). Rescue for Money: Paid Helpers in Poland, 1939-1945. Jerusalem: Yad Vashem. ISBN 978-9653083257 OCLC 974380257
- (2010, with Barbara Engelking). Żydów łamiących prawo należy karać śmiercią! "Przestępczość" Żydów w Warszawie, 1939-1942. Warsaw: Stowarzyszenie Centrum Badań nad Zagładą Żydów. ISBN 839268317X OCLC 750651880
- (2011, with Barbara Engelking). Zarys krajobrazu: wieś polska wobec zagłady Żydów 1942–1945. Warsaw: Stowarzyszenie Centrum Badań nad Zagładą Żydów. ISBN 978-8393220243 OCLC 761074409
- (2011). Judenjagd: Polowanie na Zydow 1942–1945. Warsaw: Stowarzyszenie Centrum Badań nad Zagładą Żydów. ISBN 978-8393220236 OCLC 715338569
  - (2013). Hunt for the Jews: Betrayal and Murder in German-Occupied Poland. Bloomington: Indiana University Press. ISBN 978-02-53010-74-2 OCLC 900191796
  - (2016). ציד היהודים; בגידה ורצח בפולין בימי הכיבוש הגרמני. Jerusalem: Yad Vashem. ISBN 978-9653085312 OCLC 993142125
- (2014, with Dariusz Libionka, eds.). Klucze i kasa: o mieniu żydowskim w Polsce pod okupacją niemiecką i we wczesnych latach powojennych, 1939–1950. Warsaw: Stowarzyszenie Centrum Badań nad Zagładą Żydów. ISBN 978-8363444358 OCLC 892600909
- (2017). "The Polish police: Collaboration in the Holocaust". Washington, DC: United States Holocaust Memorial Museum (Ina Levine annual lecture, 17 November 2016).
- (2018, co-edited with Barbara Engelking),\. Dalej jest noc: losy Żydów w wybranych powiatach okupowanej Polski (Night without End: The Fates of Jews in Selected Counties of Occupied Poland). Warsaw: Stowarzyszenie Centrum Badań nad Zagładą Żydów (Polish Center for Holocaust Research), 2 volumes (1,640 pp.). ISBN 978-8363444648 OCLC 1041616741
- (2020). Na posterunku. Udział polskiej policji granatowej i kryminalnej w zagładzie Żydów (On Duty: Participation of Blue and Criminal Police in the Destruction of the Jews). Wydawnictwo Czarne, Wołowiec. ISBN 978-8380499867
- (2021). Polacy, nic się nie stało! Polemiki z Zagładą w tle (Poles, Nothing Happened! Polemics with the Holocaust in the Background), Wydawnictwa Austeria.

== See also ==
- Anti-Jewish violence in Poland, 1944–1946
- Collaboration in German-occupied Poland
- Fear: Anti-Semitism in Poland after Auschwitz (2006)
- History of the Jews in Poland
- Polish Righteous among the Nations
- Rescue of Jews by Poles during the Holocaust
- Szczuczyn pogrom (June 1941)
- Kielce pogrom (4 July 1946)
- Wąsosz pogrom (5 July 1941)
- Jedwabne pogrom (10 July 1941)
- Żegota
