= The Warsaw Ghetto: A Guide to the Perished City =

2009 book by Barbara Engelking and Jacek Leociak

- Cover image of the first edition in Polish
- Author: Barbara Engelking and Jacek Leociak
- Original title: Getto warszawskie. Przewodnik po nieistniejącym mieście
- Translator: Emma Harris
- Publisher: IFiS PAN, Yale University Press
- Publication date: 2001
- English publication date: 2009
- Media type: Print
- Pages: 906
- ISBN: 9780300112344

The Warsaw Ghetto: A Guide to the Perished City is a 2009 book by Barbara Engelking and Jacek Leociak. It was first published in Polish in 2001 as Getto warszawskie. Przewodnik po nieistniejącym mieście. The book focuses on the Warsaw Ghetto.

== Synopsis ==
The Warsaw Ghetto focuses on the Warsaw Ghetto and its almost four-year history. According to a review in Shofar, the work is "a unique and detailed monograph that gives the reader an insight into the daily life of Jewish inhabitants of the closed district". At 800-pages, the book details "the institutional structure of the ghetto, its relations with the Nazi government, important social institutions, and the economic and community life of the ghetto population," amounting almost to an encyclopedia.

== Reception ==
A review by the Jewish Book Council finds The Warsaw Ghetto to be an "encyclopedic and impressive work" that does not make for an easy reading, but provides a rich and comprehensive portrayal of the life and fate of the ghetto community. Michael Marrus described it as "a stunning work, one of the most important books on the history of the Nazi Holocaust".
