= Judenjagd =

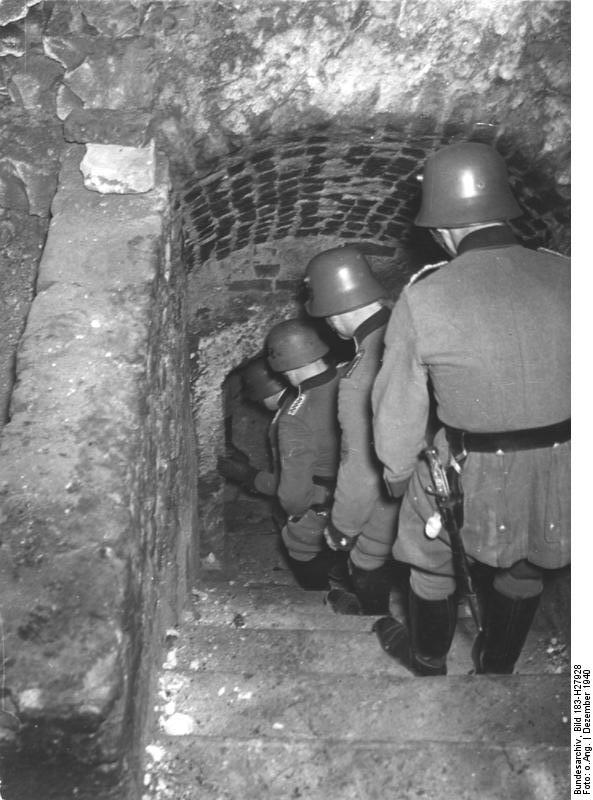
The German Order Police "Orpo" descending to the cellars on a "Jew-hunt", Lublin, December 1940

Judenjagd (German: “Hunt for Jews”) were German-conducted searches, beginning in 1942, for Jews who were in hiding in German-occupied Poland. The term was introduced by Christopher R. Browning. Targeted in the searches were Jews concealed among the Polish gentile population or in the forests—generally escapees from ghetto liquidations and from deportations to concentration camps.

== Victims ==
By some estimates, in these circumstances, as many as 200,000 Jews may have been killed, died of starvation or exposure, or been delivered to German occupiers. From October 1941, persons helping Jews in occupied Poland were subject to the death penalty.

In 2018 Tomasz Frydel reviewed and reassessed the "perpetrator role" of ordinary Poles, discussed in Jan Grabowski's book, Hunt for the Jews. Frydel described the Nazi terror system directed not only against Jews but against non-Jewish Poles and others, including the Polish underground, Soviet prisoners of war and Roma. German police in occupied Poland used sting operations, sometimes employing Jews, to find and kill those who rescued or sheltered their quarries.
