= Night Without End (history book) =

2018 history book edited by Jan Grabowski and Barbara Engelking

- First Polish edition published by the Polish Center for Holocaust Research
- Editors: Jan Grabowski and Barbara Engelking
- Original title: Dalej jest noc
- Publisher: Polish Center for Holocaust Research, Indiana University Press
- Publication date: 2018
- English publication date: 2022
- Pages: 546
- ISBN: 978-0253062857

Night Without End: The Fate of Jews in German-Occupied Poland (originally published in Polish as Dalej jest noc: losy Żydów w wybranych powiatach okupowanej Polski), co-edited by historian Jan Grabowski and sociologist Barbara Engelking, is a two-volume study published in Polish in 2018 by the Polish Center for Holocaust Research in Warsaw, Poland. The book covers, in case-study analyses, the history of Jews during the Holocaust in nine rural areas of the German-administered General Government. An English-language version was published by Indiana University Press in September 2022.

== Content ==
The 1,600-page study, the result of research conducted in 2012-2017, was published in 2018 in two volumes. It describes the lives of Jews in nine selected areas of World War II German-occupied Poland, mostly within the General Government. It recounts Jews' strategies of survival and their relations with other populations and with German-operated government agencies. Dalej jest noc consists of nine chapters, each covering a Kreishauptmannschaft or pre-war Polish county (powiat). The nine chapters, and their respective authors, are:

- Bielsk Podlaski (Barbara Engelking)
- Biłgoraj (Alina Skibińska)
- Bochnia (Dagmara Swałtek-Niewińska)
- Dębica (Tomasz Frydel)
- Łuków (Jean-Charles Szurek)
- Miechów (Dariusz Libionka)
- Nowy Targ (Karolina Panz)
- Węgrów (Jan Grabowski)
- Złoczów (Anna Zapalec).

The authors organize their respective chapters variously – some chronologically, others by particular questions. The study focuses on 1942–1943, when the Germans liquidated most of the Jewish ghettos. It includes nine maps, a bibliography, biographical and geographical indexes, an abbreviations glossary, and brief author biographies. Some chapters contain their own bibliographies and appendices.

== Reception ==
Literary critic Beth Holmgren wrote that Dalej jest noc is a "highly detailed, systematically organized, data-based analysis of how and by whom the Holocaust was perpetrated in nine separate Polish counties". Ingo Loose, a historian at the Institute for Contemporary History in Munich, said that the book debunks the view that non-Jewish Poles helped Jews en masse or were at worst forced to be bystanders. He states that the book will continue to have value for many years and to many researchers. Historian Stephan Lehnstaedt was less enthusiastic about the book: while he was impressed by the breadth of research and details and said it was innovative, stimulating, and lent itself to "highly fascinating interpretations", he found the book "intentionally political" and concluded that it had some methodological concerns and that it unintentionally blurred the German responsibility for the Holocaust by not including relevant descriptions of German activities.

Historian Jacek Chrobaczyński writes that the study is based on a solid analysis of sources. He notes the naming of perpetrators and co-perpetrators – individuals who took over Jewish property – and participation by the Polish Blue Police, Baudienst, fire brigades, and military guards. Chrobaczyński states that the study is important in deconstructing some political myths and propaganda in Polish history writing, journalism, church pronouncements, and politics. He concludes that the two volumes are "solid and reliable scholarship". Karolina Koprowska calls it a unique book with both a clear scholarly goal and a political message, taking a clear stance in the ongoing discussion in Poland about Polish-Jewish historical relations. She praised the book for its solid methodology, the focus on micro-history, and the demonstration of the differences in local characteristics of the Jewish life, which she said enabled the authors to paint a picture of the local life that could not be fully generalised across different communities. She noted that the book may, however, lack an overarching methodological conclusion and that it did not attempt a new grand theory of Polish-Jewish wartime history. Historian Adam Kopciowski similarly commended the usage of "an impressive range of sources", including materials from various organisations and from Polish and Jewish witnesses, which were accessed in the archives in Poland, Israel, the United States, Germany, Ukraine, Belarus, and Russia, which, as he argued, helped them "develop an exhaustive picture of a previously understudied stage of the Holocaust of the Polish Jews". Kopciowski also applauded the methodology of the study, hoping that it would be further adopted in the subject matter studies.

Literary scholar Joanna Tokarska-Bakir, who analysed the Bielsk county section, said that while she was impressed by the amount of work that was put in publication, she did not agree with Engelking's summary that the anti-Semitism in Bielsk county "was rather of an ethnological and religious, rather than political or economical, nature". She further doubted the Engelking's distinction between the behaviour of the local peasants and the local szlachta (aristocracy), saying that the sources she used and the knowledge of the area did not warrant such conclusions.

Many scholars affiliated with the Institute of National Remembrance (IPN) criticized the book severely — in particular, Tomasz Domański published a 72-page review, followed by a 110-page rebut to the responses by the individual authors. Other historians found their criticism to be politically motivated, unscholarly, and insignificant; accusing the IPN's reviewers of having adopted a "hairsplitting" approach that involved combing through every footnote and statement for potential errors, they held their polemics as a tool to mainstream the right-wing conception of Polish history — where the Poles had no culpability regarding the persecution of Jews during the Nazi regime since they were, at worst, merely following orders — and push back against all critical narratives.

== Litigation ==
The Polish edition of the book states that Edward Malinowski, sołtys (village elder) of the Polish village of Malinowo, was responsible for the deaths of dozens of Jews who were in hiding from the Germans during World War II. In 2019, his niece Filomena Leszczyńska asserted that, on the contrary, Malinowski had assisted Jews, at the risk of his own life and the lives of his family. With the help of the Polish League Against Defamation (RDI), who provided her with a lawyer, she sued Professors Engelking and Grabowski, the book's editors, in Warsaw Regional Court for allegedly defaming Malinowski. Her lawyer objected to a few sentences and a footnote, (Note: The book cited Estera Drogicka, a Jew who was hiding in Malinowski's house, who testified in favour of the sołtys during a post-war trial (Malinowski was acquitted), but appeared not to cite her 1990s interview in which she described Malinowski's crimes despite seeming to use the materials.) for which the plaintiffs sought zł 100,000 in compensation and a public apology. Engelking said that she was simply reporting a witness's opinion, rejecting any wrongdoing on her behalf and published her detailed response to the accusations and trial on the Polish Center for Holocaust Research website.

The lawsuit was met with condemnation from foreign researchers. Israel's official Holocaust memorial Yad Vashem stated: "Legal proceedings against Holocaust scholars because of their research are incompatible with accepted academic research norms and amount to an attack on the effort to achieve a full and balanced picture of the history of the Holocaust". Zygmunt Stępiński, director of the Polin Museum, said that "[the] involvement in this trial of an organisation heavily subsidised with public funds [could] be easily construed as a form of censorship and an attempt to frighten scholars away from publishing the results of their research out of fear of a lawsuit and the ensuing costly litigation." The Simon Wiesenthal Center and the European Holocaust Research Infrastructure similarly disapproved of the lawsuit. Robert Blobaum suggested that the lawsuit had apparent support from the government. (Note: Maciej Świrski, leader of the RDI, was appointed head of the supervisory board of the Polish Press Agency in September 2020.)

In February 2021, the Warsaw Regional Court found the authors guilty of defamation and ordered Grabowski and Engelking to apologise for their claims about Malinowski, but it did not order them to pay compensation, finding that their error was not deliberate. Grabowski and Engelking appealed the verdict to the Court of Appeals in Warsaw, which overturned the lower court's ruling and cleared them of all charges. The appellate court decided that ruling otherwise would constitute impermissible infringement on academic freedom. Filomena Leszczyńska, the main plaintiff, died in October 2021; her funeral was attended by some local and central government officials, including Jan Dziedziczak, an official in the Chancellery of the Prime Minister of Poland responsible for Polish diaspora matters, and the head of Siemiatycze County.

== See also ==
- Hunt for the Jews
