= "What! Still Alive?!" =

2017 book by Monika Rice

"What! Still Alive?!": Jewish Survivors in Poland and Israel Remember Homecoming
- Cover of the first edition
- Author: Monika Rice
- Language: English
- Subject: History
- Publisher: Syracuse University Press
- Publication date: 2017
- Publication place: United States
- Media type: Print
- Pages: 272
- ISBN: 978-0815635390

"What! Still Alive?!": Jewish Survivors in Poland and Israel Remember Homecoming is a 2017 book by historian Monika Rice that deals with the memories of Jewish Holocaust survivors of their first encounters with ethnic Poles after liberation from Nazi German rule. The testimonies were all found in archives at Yad Vashem and the Jewish Historical Institute in Poland.

The Polish testimonies were collected between 1944 and 1950, while the Israeli ones were created significantly later (from 1955 to 1970). There are significant differences between these testimonies based on the context that they were made in; Rice hypothesizes that in Israel, survivors may have recounted events in such a way as to justify their emigration. The book describes a "disturbing narrative of violence, hostility, and indifference" towards survivors, according to Polish-American historian Anna Cichopek-Gajraj.

In her review of the book, published in The Polish Review, Irena Grudzińska-Gross noted that, as stated in the book, the reaction of disbelief was only found in one of the testimonies. She also wrote that in the testimonies used by Rice, the war overshadowed the postwar encounters, but Rice did a good job sorting them out.

Writing in Holocaust and Genocide Studies, Gordon J. Horwitz called the book "perceptive and closely argued" and a "carefully researched analytical study". He also praised it for dealing sensitively with the testimonies that comprise its source material. In AJS Review, Cichopek-Gajraj also praised the book, writing that it was "a uniquely readable, remarkably affecting, and truly original text that is a must read" for people interested in Polish-Jewish relations, and she called it "one of the best books on the subject in recent years". In the Slavic Review, Rachel Brenner wrote that the work is a "well-researched and interesting book" and "a serious, well-done study which makes an important contribution to the field of Holocaust studies".

== See also ==
- Anti-Jewish violence in Poland, 1944–1946
