= Włodzimierz Borodziej =

Polish historian and writer (1956–2021)

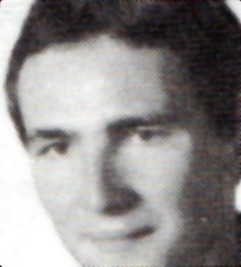
- Born: 9 September 1956; Warsaw, Poland
- Died: 12 July 2021 (aged 64)
- Education: Warsaw University
- Occupations: Political analyst, academic, historian
- Known for: historical research on the World War II, especially the Warsaw Uprising

Włodzimierz Borodziej (9 September 1956 – 12 July 2021) was a Polish historian and writer specializing in contemporary European history with particular focus on Polish-German relations. Borodziej was a professor of humanistic sciences, and former prorector of the Warsaw University. He was the Polish-side Chairman of German-Polish Textbook Commission from 1997 to 2007.

== Biography ==
Born in Warsaw, Włodzimierz Borodziej was the son of Lieutenant-Colonel Wiktor Borodziej (1929–2004). He was the former Polish secret police Służba Bezpieczeństwa who reportedly helped his son acquire German high school education in Berlin and in Vienna while serving abroad. Discussion of his father and his involvement with the secret operation Żelazo (Iron) against political targets in Western Europe, has caused some controversy in Polish academia, as some commentators see it as irrelevant, and an attempt to discredit his son's work due to family background.

Włodzimierz Borodziej graduated with a master's degree from the Warsaw University in 1979. In 1984, Borodziej received a title of Doctor of Philosophy from his own alma mater, followed by habilitation earned in 1991 for his scientific treatise Poland in international relations between 1945 and 1947 (Polska w stosunkach międzynarodowych 1945-1947). In 2004, he received the title of professor of humanistic sciences at Warsaw University. He also served as a protector in the 1999–2002 (deputy to university's rector). In 2020, he was awarded the Carl von Ossietzky Prize (Carl-Ossietzky-Preis) conferred by the German city of Oldenburg for his work on the Polish-German history in the 20th century.

== Work ==
Borodziej was the author of The Warsaw Uprising of 1944 published in Polish, German and English. In his book, he paints a complex picture of the everyday life in the embattled city, describes the Home Army operations, as well as supply situation and medical challenges in the capital.

Borodziej was also a leading figure in the establishment of the House of European History which opened in Brussels, Belgium in 2017.

== Selected publications ==
- Włodzimierz Borodziej (1985), Terror i polityka : policja niemiecka a polski ruch oporu w GG 1939-1944, ISBN 83-211-0718-4.
- Włodzimierz Borodziej (1990), Od Poczdamu do Szklarskiej Poręby: Polska w stosunkach międzynarodowych 1945-1947, ISBN 0-906601-77-0.
- Włodzimierz Borodziej at al (1999), Polska i Niemcy: krótki przewodnik po historii sąsiedztwa, ISBN 83-910344-0-2.
- Włodzimierz Borodziej (2001), Der Warschauer Aufstand 1944, ISBN 3-10-007806-3.
- Włodzimierz Borodziej (2006), The Warsaw Uprising of 1944, ISBN 0-299-20730-7.
- Włodzimierz Borodziej (2009), Gdyby... całkiem inna historia Polski: historia kontrfaktyczna, ISBN 978-83-247-1676-0.
- (co-author) (2015), Nasza wojna. Europa Środkowo-Wschodnia 1912–1916. Volume 1. Imperia.
- (co-author) (2018) Nasza wojna. Europa Środkowo-Wschodnia 1917–1923. Volume 2. Narody.
