= German Historical Institute Warsaw =

Polish-based German history institute

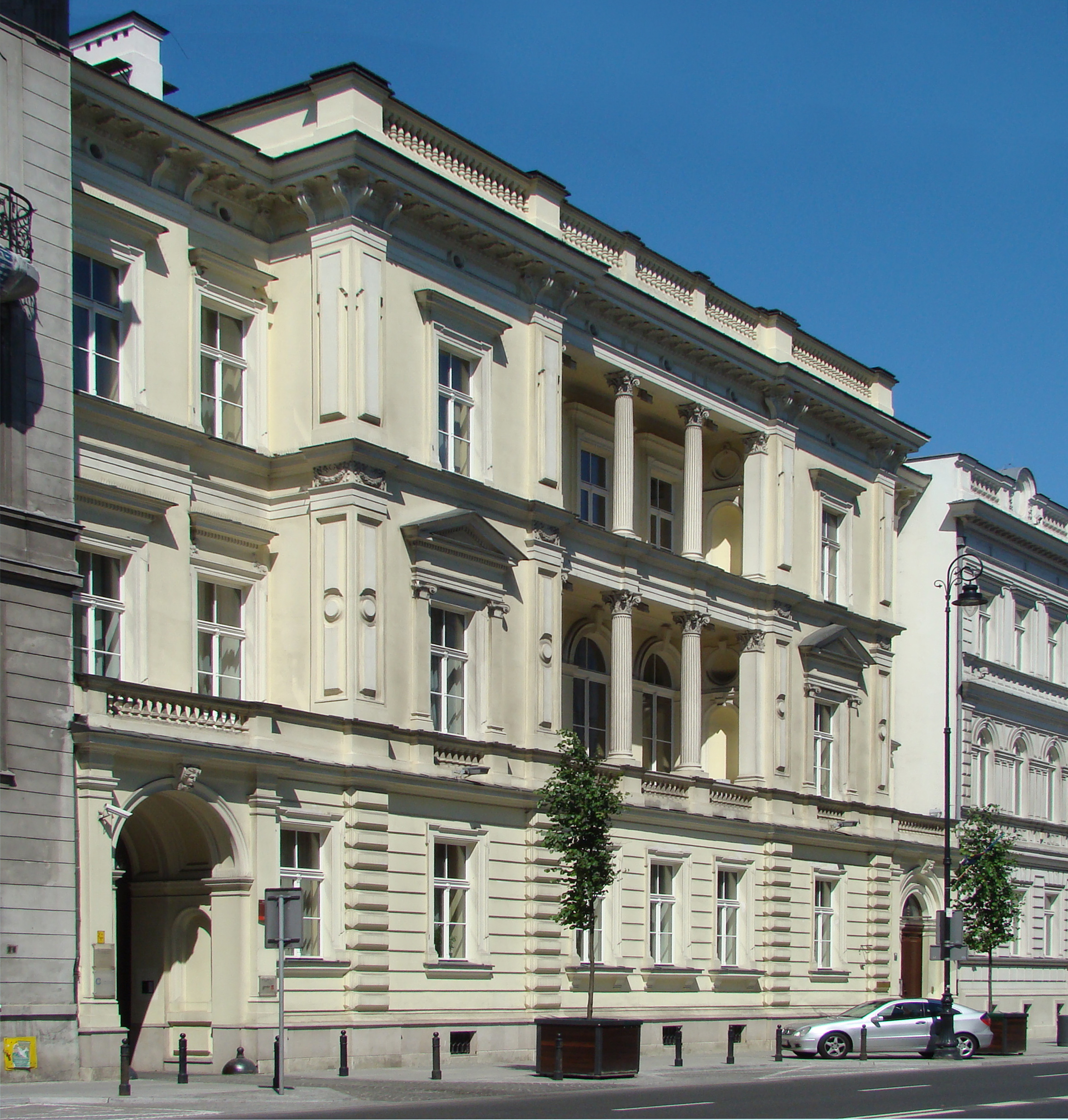
German Historical Institute Warsaw

The German Historical Institute Warsaw is a history institute of the Max Weber Stiftung based in Warsaw, Poland. The director of the institute is Prof. Dr. Miloš Řezník, and the deputy director is Prof. Dr. Ruth Leiserowitz.

Since 2017, the GHI has a branch office in Vilnius which promotes research on the history of Lithuania in the Central and Eastern European context and on Lithuania‘s historical ties with Germany, Poland and other countries in the region. A second branch office, which supports scientific research on Czech, German and Polish history in the European context, was opened in Prague in spring 2018, in close cooperation with a branch of the Collegium Carolinum Munich at the Academy of Sciences of the Czech Republic.

== Research ==
The institute’s mission is to do scientific research, which is mainly concerned with the history of Poland, Germany and Polish-German relations in the European context. Currently, the work is organized in four fields of research: - Space: Regions and Material Culture - Violence: Social Practices and Power Relations - Mobility: Migration and Global Networks - Memory Culture: Dealing with the Past These research areas integrate both the individual projects of the research assistants and, where possible, the projects of scholarship holders, interns and guest researchers. In this way, the projects offer a common thematic framework that promotes productive research.

== Research Transfer ==
In order to support the international dialog among historians, the institute is highly engaged in research transfer. Here, the focus is on the relations between historians in Poland and Germany, as well as on those who are engaged in historical research about Polish-German relations and research on neighboring East-Central European countries. In particular, the GHI supports research projects and publications, organizes academic events, and offers scholarships.

== Publications ==
In four book series, the German Historical Institute Warsaw publishes its own and external research findings and source editions on the history of Poland and the history of German-Polish relations. In addition, it publishes studies of German and Polish historiography on European, German and Polish history in German and Polish translation.

== Library ==
The GHI Warsaw owns a scientific library, which is open to the public and holds around 90,000 volumes.

== See also ==
- Germany–Poland relations
