= Havi Dreifuss =

Israeli historian

- חוי דרייפוס
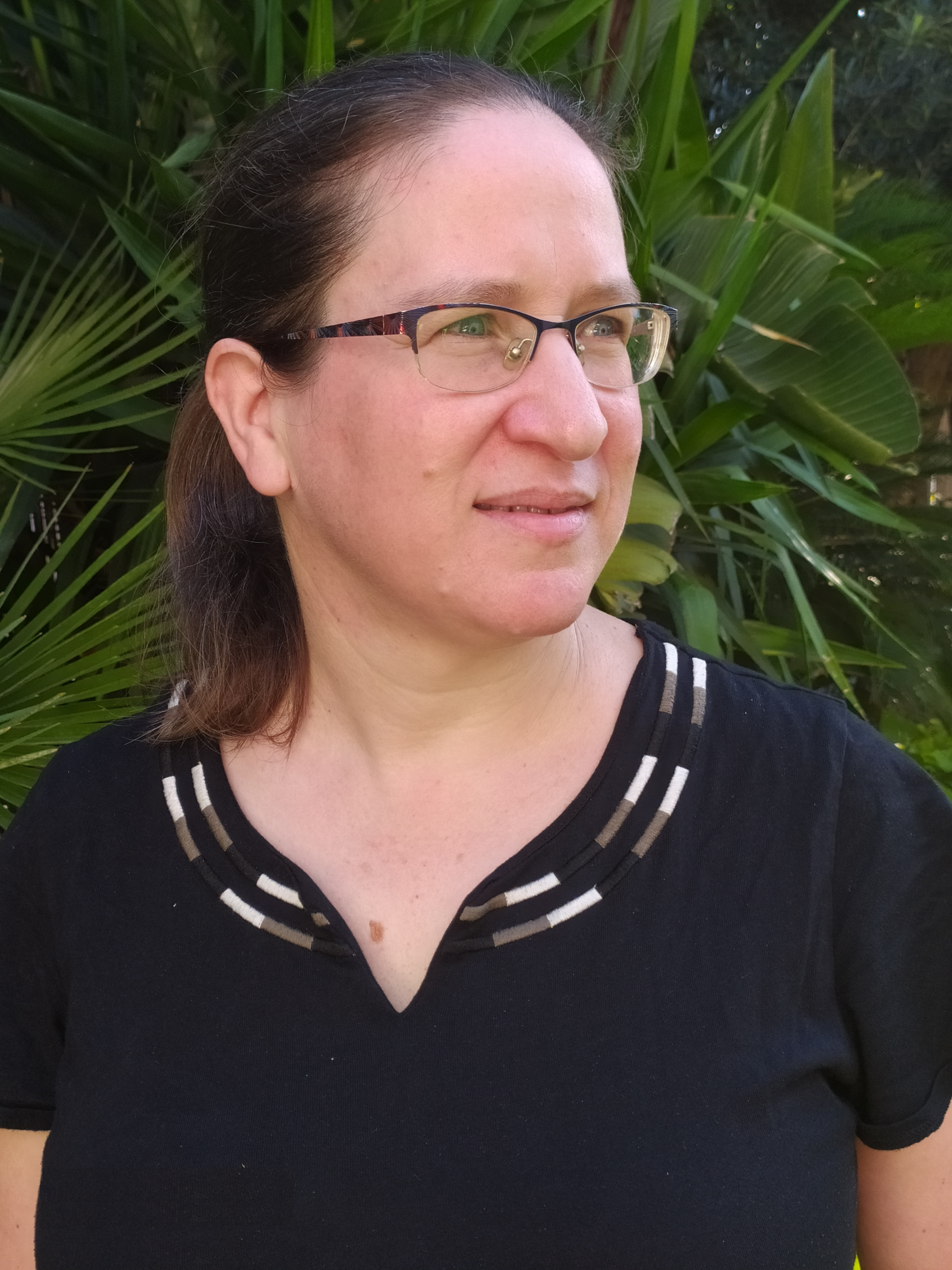
- Havi Dreifuss
- Born: 1972 (age 53–54); Jerusalem
- Occupation: Historian
- Awards: Mandel Scholarship, the Mandel Scholion Research Center at the Hebrew University of Jerusalem

Academic background
- Education: Ph.D., Hebrew University of Jerusalem
- Thesis: Poland and Poles in the eyes of Polish Jews during the Second World War (1939-1944) (2005)

Academic work
- Era: The Holocaust in Poland; 1939–1945 Polish–Jewish relations
- Institutions: Yad Vashem; University of Tel Aviv
- Notable works: Relations between Jews and Poles during the Holocaust: the Jewish perspective (2017)

Havi (Hava) Dreifuss (Hebrew: חוי (חוה) דרייפוס) is a professor of history at the University of Tel Aviv and head of the Center for Research on the Holocaust in Poland at Yad Vashem. She specializes in the history of the Holocaust in Poland and Polish-Jewish relations during World War II.

She received her doctorate in history from the Hebrew University of Jerusalem in 2005.
