= Grzegorz Rossoliński-Liebe =

German-Polish historian

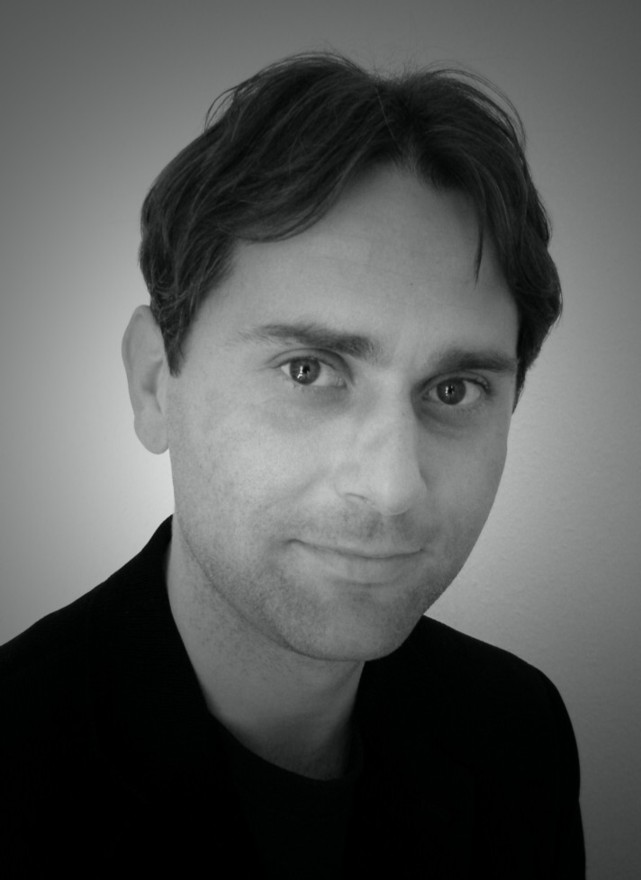
- Grzegorz Rossoliński-Liebe in 2012
- Born: 1979 (age 46–47); Zabrze, Poland
- Education: European University Viadrina, University of Hamburg
- Occupation: Historian
- Known for: study of Nationalism, World War II, Holocaust, Fascism, Eastern Europe

Grzegorz Rossoliński-Liebe (born 1979 in Zabrze, Poland as Grzegorz Rossoliński) is a German–Polish historian based in Berlin, associated with the Friedrich Meinecke Institute of the Free University of Berlin. He specializes in the history of the Holocaust and East-Central Europe, fascism, nationalism, the history of antisemitism, the history of the Soviet Union, and the politics of memory.

== Career ==
Rossoliński-Liebe studied cultural history and East European history at the European University Viadrina in Frankfurt (Oder) from 1999 to 2005. He worked on his doctoral dissertation about Stepan Bandera and the Organization of Ukrainian Nationalists at the University of Alberta and the University of Hamburg from 2007, and defended his PhD at the University of Hamburg in June 2012. Between 2012 and 2014, he worked on a post-doctoral project at the Free University of Berlin on the Ukrainian diasporic memory of the Holocaust. He also worked as a research assistant at the Foundation Memorial to the Murdered Jews of Europe and at the Vienna Wiesenthal Institute for Holocaust Studies. He is the author of Stepan Bandera: The Life and Afterlife of a Ukrainian Nationalist. Fascism, Genocide, and Cult, a scholarly biography of Ukrainian nationalist leader Stepan Bandera, and an in-depth study of his political cult. From 2014 to 2018, Rossoliński-Liebe investigated the German-Polish collaboration in World War II. During this time, he was a Saul Kagan Fellow of the Claims Conference and a fellow of the United States Holocaust Memorial Museum, the Harry Frank Guggenheim Foundation, the Fondation pour la Mémoire de la Shoah, the German Historical Institute Warsaw and the Yad Vashem International Institute for Holocaust Research.

== Political reactions ==
Rossoliński-Liebe was invited in late February and early March 2012 by the Heinrich Böll Foundation, the German Academic Exchange Service, and the German embassy in Kyiv, to deliver six lectures about Bandera in three Ukrainian cities. The lectures were scheduled to take place in February and March 2012 in Lviv, Dnipro and Kyiv. The organizers, however, were unable to find a suitable venue in Lviv, and also, three of the four lectures in Dnipro and Kyiv were canceled a few hours prior to the event.

The only lecture took place in the German embassy in Kyiv, under the protection of police. In front of the building, approximately one hundred protesters, including members of the radical-right Svoboda party, tried to convince a few hundred interested students, scholars, and ordinary Ukrainians not to attend the presentation, claiming that Rossoliński-Liebe was "Joseph Goebbels' grandchild" and a "liberal fascist from Berlin." In response to the harassment and threats made towards him during his lecture trip in Ukraine, the online petition "For Freedom of Speech and Expression in Ukraine" was signed by 97 persons, including scholar Delphine Bechtel.

== Publications ==
=== Books and Papers ===
- Polnische Bürgermeister und der Holocaust. Besatzung, Verwaltung und Kollaboration [Polish Mayors and the Holocaust. Occupation, Administration and Collaboration] (in German). Oldenbourg: De Gruyter. 2024. doi:10.1515/9783110750065. ISBN 978-3-11-074897-0.
- Faszystowski trzon radykalnego nacjonalizmu ukraińskiego [Fascist core of radical Ukrainian nationalism] (in Polish). Warsaw: Centrum Badań nad Zagładą Żydów. 2020. ISBN 978-83-954339-0-0.
- Der polnisch-ukrainische Konflikt im Historikerdiskurs: Perspektiven, Interpretationen und Aufarbeitung. Wien: New Academic Press, 2017, ISBN 978-3-7003-1988-7.
- The Fascist Kernel of Ukrainian Genocidal Nationalism. The Carl Beck Papers in Russian and East European Studies. Vol. 2402. Pittsburgh: The Center for Russian and East European Studies. 2015. doi:10.5195/cbp.2015.204.
- Stepan Bandera: The Life and Afterlife of a Ukrainian Nationalist. Fascism, Genocide, and Cult. Stuttgart: Ibidem Press. 2014. ISBN 978-3-8382-0604-2. (Reviewed by Delphine Bechtel)

=== Books edited ===
- With Arnd Bauerkämper: Fascism without Borders. Transnational Connections and Cooperation between Movements and Regimes in Europe 1918 to 1945. Oxford: Berghahn 2017, ISBN 978-1-78533-468-9.
- With Regina Fritz und Jana Starek: Alma mater antisemitica. Akademisches Milieu, Juden und Antisemitismus an den Universitäten Europas zwischen 1918 und 1939. Wien: New Academic Press, 2016, ISBN 978-3-7003-1922-1.

=== Articles and Book Chapters ===
- "Putin s Abuse of History: Ukrainian Nazis Genocide and a Fake Threat Scenario". The Journal of Slavic Military Studies. 35 (1): 1–10. 2023. doi:10.1080/13518046.2022.2058179.
