= Jacek Leociak =

Polish literary scholar and historian (born 1957)

Jacek Leociak PhD
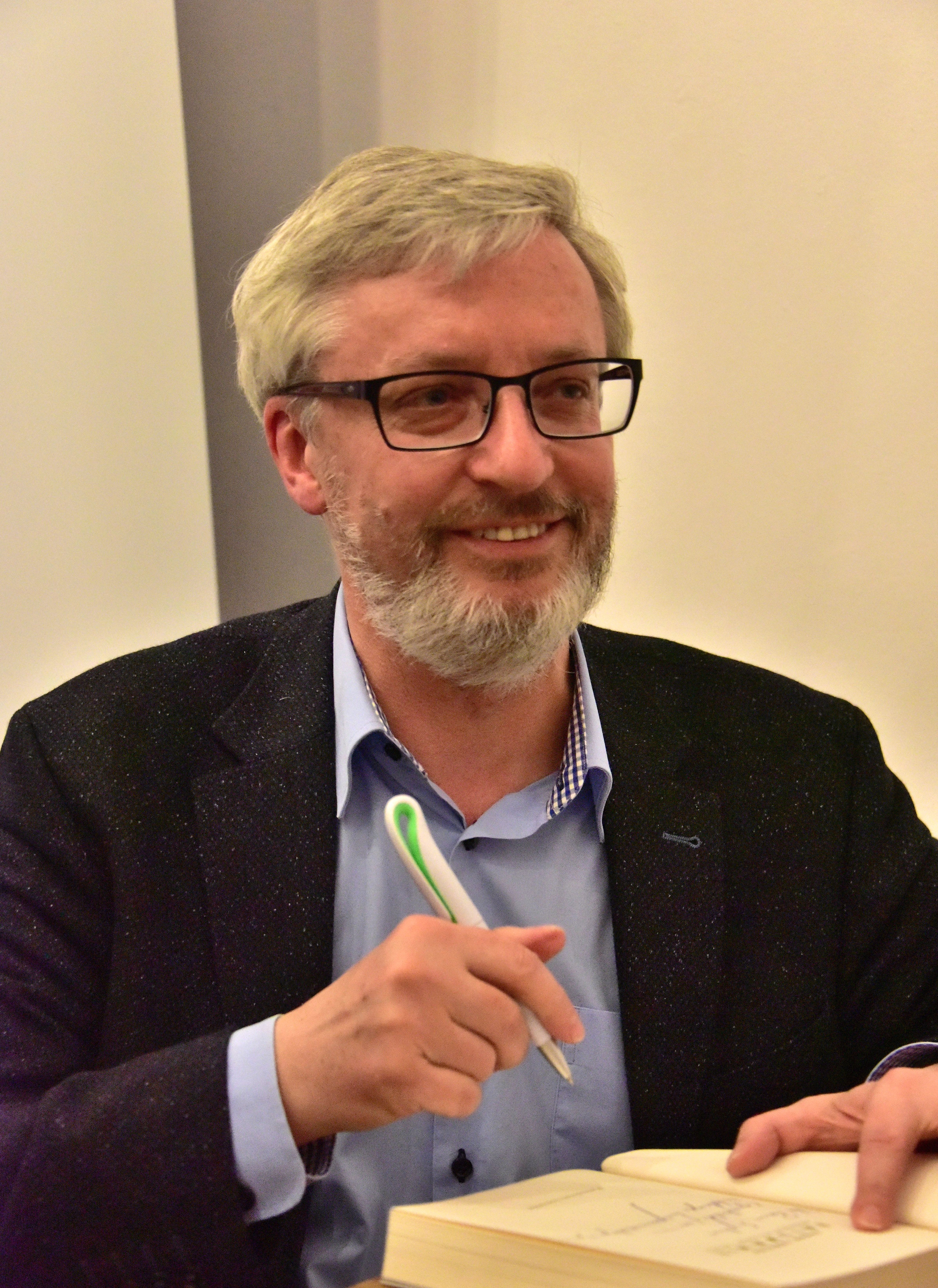
- Leociak in 2018
- Born: 2 June 1957 (age 69); Warsaw, Poland
- Occupations: literary scholar, author

Academic background
- Education: Polish Academy of Sciences; University of Warsaw

Academic work
- Era: 20th century
- Institutions: Polish Center for Holocaust Research; Institute of Literary Research of the Polish Academy of Sciences
- Main interests: Holocaust in Poland

Jacek Leociak (born 2 June 1957, in Warsaw) is a Polish literary scholar and historian as well as author. He is a professor of humanities and an employee of the Institute of Literary Research of the Polish Academy of Sciences and the Polish Center for Holocaust Research in Warsaw.

== Education and career ==
The son of Wacław Leociak and Wanda née Herbert. He received a Ph.D. in 1996 at the Institute of Literary Research of the Polish Academy of Sciences with a dissertation on the Warsaw Ghetto. He was awarded the title of Professor at the Academy in 2013.

Since 1997, Leociak was head of the research team on Holocaust literature at the Institute of Literary Research. He also joined the Polish Center for Holocaust Research at the Institute of Philosophy and Sociology of the Polish Academy of Sciences.

In 2008, he was awarded the Knight's Cross of the Order of Polonia Restituta for "his important contributions to exploring, collecting, and popularizing the information on the Holocaust as well as his activism for remembering the history of the Warsaw Ghetto Uprising".

In 2015, he was awarded the Decoration of Honor Meritorious for Polish Culture.

In January 2019, he became the recipient of the Kazimierz Wyka Award for his outstanding contributions to artistic and literary criticism.

In May 2019, he received a nomination for Poland's top literary prize, the Nike Award, for his work Młyny boże. Zapiski o kościele i Zagładzie (Mills of God. Notes on the Church and the Holocaust).

== Research focus ==
Leociak deals with the analysis of various forms of recording and of representation of the Holocaust experience. His research interests also include the narratives of victims, perpetrators and witnesses as well as the history of the Warsaw ghetto.

Together with Barbara Engelking, he published the book The Warsaw Ghetto: A Guide to the Perished City, which first appeared in Polish in 2001. It focuses on the Warsaw Ghetto and its almost four-year history. According to a review in Shofar: An Interdisciplinary Journal of Jewish Studies, the work is "a unique and detailed monograph that gives the reader an insight into the daily life of Jewish inhabitants of the closed district". At 800-pages, the book details "the institutional structure of the ghetto, its relations with the German Nazi government, important social institutions, and the economic and community life of the ghetto population," amounting almost to an encyclopedia. A review by the Jewish Book Council finds The Warsaw Ghetto to be an "encyclopedic and impressive work" that does not make for an easy reading, but provides a rich and comprehensive portrayal of the life and fate of the ghetto community.

== Selected works ==
- Tekst wobec zagłady. O relacjach z getta warszawskiego, Wrocław, 1997
- Doświadczenia graniczne. Studia o dwudziestowiecznych formach reprezentacji, Warsaw, 2009
- The Warsaw Ghetto: A Guide to the Perished City, Yale University Press, 2009 (with Barbara Engelking)
- Ratowanie. Opowieści Polaków i Żydów (The Rescuing. The Stories of Poles and Jews), Kraków, 2010
- Biografie ulic, Dom Spotkań z Historią, Warsaw, 2018
- Młyny boże. Zapiski o Kościele i Zagładzie (Mills of God. Notes on the Church and the Holocaust), Wydawnictwo Czarne, Wołowiec, 2018, ISBN 978-83-8049-646-0
- Wieczne strapienie. O kłamstwie, historii i Kościele (Eternal distress. About lies, history and the Church), Wydawnictwo Czarne, Wołowiec, 2020, ISBN 978-83-8191-113-9

== See also ==
- History of Poland (1939-1945)
