= Baudienst =

Nazi German forced labor organization

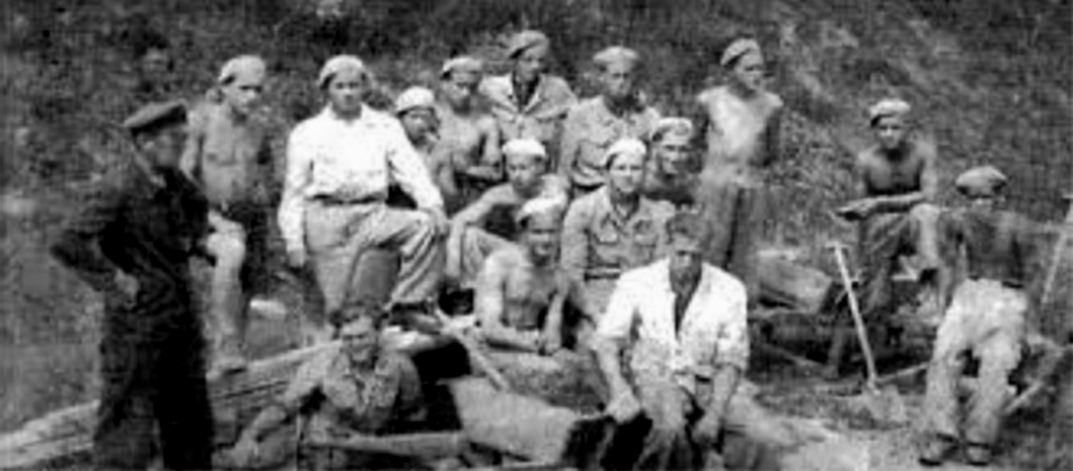
- Baudienst in occupied Kraków (suburban Czyżyny area of the General Government), c. 1941. Second from right, leaning against the wheelbarrow, is Karol Wojtyła (later Pope John-Paul II)

Agency overview
- Formed: December 1940
- Type: Labour battalions
- Jurisdiction: Nazi Germany (General Government)
- Employees: ≈45,000
- Parent agency: Reichsarbeitsdienst

Baudienst (from German, lit. "building service" or "construction service"), full name in German Baudienst im Generalgouvernement (Construction Service in the General Government), was a forced labour organization created by Nazi Germany in the General Government territory of occupied Poland during World War II. Baudienst was subordinate to the Reichsarbeitsdienst (RAD, lit. "Reich Labour Service").

== Formation and activities ==
The Baudienst construction was formed 1 December 1940, originally in the Kraków District of the General Government, but it eventually expanded to all districts of the newly-formed region, except for the Warsaw District. The goal of Baudienst was to provide the Third Reich with a large pool of obligatory labour force.

Baudienst laborers were entitled to housing, food rations, working clothes, medical care and a wage of 1 zloty per day (a wage that was never changed, despite increasing inflation). Over time, conditions of work deteriorated, as laborers inhabited poor quality barracks (never a priority), and food and clothing rations were slashed. Punished laborers were imprisoned in Liban working camp in Kraków (Liban Quarry).

Baudienst was to build and maintain infrastructure (construction and repair of roads and canals), and aid with agricultural tasks. The overall objective was not to build infrastructure for the Poles, but for the Germans (with the aim of increasing West-East transport capacity in preparation for German invasion of the Soviet Union, and later, to improve the efficiency of German logistics). In some infamous cases, members of Baudienst were used to prepare graves for victims of German mass executions (of Poles, Jews and other victims of the Third Reich) or to destroy Jewish houses and hiding places.

In the General Government, working was obligatory for any male Pole from 18 to 60 years old; later in the occupation this range extended to youth from 14 years old. Baudienst service itself was an obligatory service for Poles aged 21–22. Germans were aiming to have as many as 150,000 Baudienst members, in fact due to constant lack of volunteers and increasing desertions, Baudienst at its height reached less than a third of that number (about 45,000 people). There were almost no volunteers in Baudienst, in 1941 only 141 were recorded, in following years Germans stopped recording their numbers altogether.

Baudienst workers were under a contract to work at least initially 3 months, increased up to 6–7 months of work during the spring-summer period and eventually a minimum of a year.

In addition to the Polish Baudienst, Germans created similar Heimatdienst (lit. "homeland service", Ukrains'ka Sluzhba Bat'kivschyni, USB) for the Ukrainians, and a similar one for the Goralenvolk. Volksdeutsche were immune from the service (but could volunteer, and some did for the higher-ranking positions such as foreman), and Polish Jews were already forced to labor in the ghettos and labor-concentration camps.

== See also ==
- Forced labor in Germany during World War II
- Organisation Todt
- Sonderdienst
