= Piotr Gontarczyk =

Polish historian (born 1970)

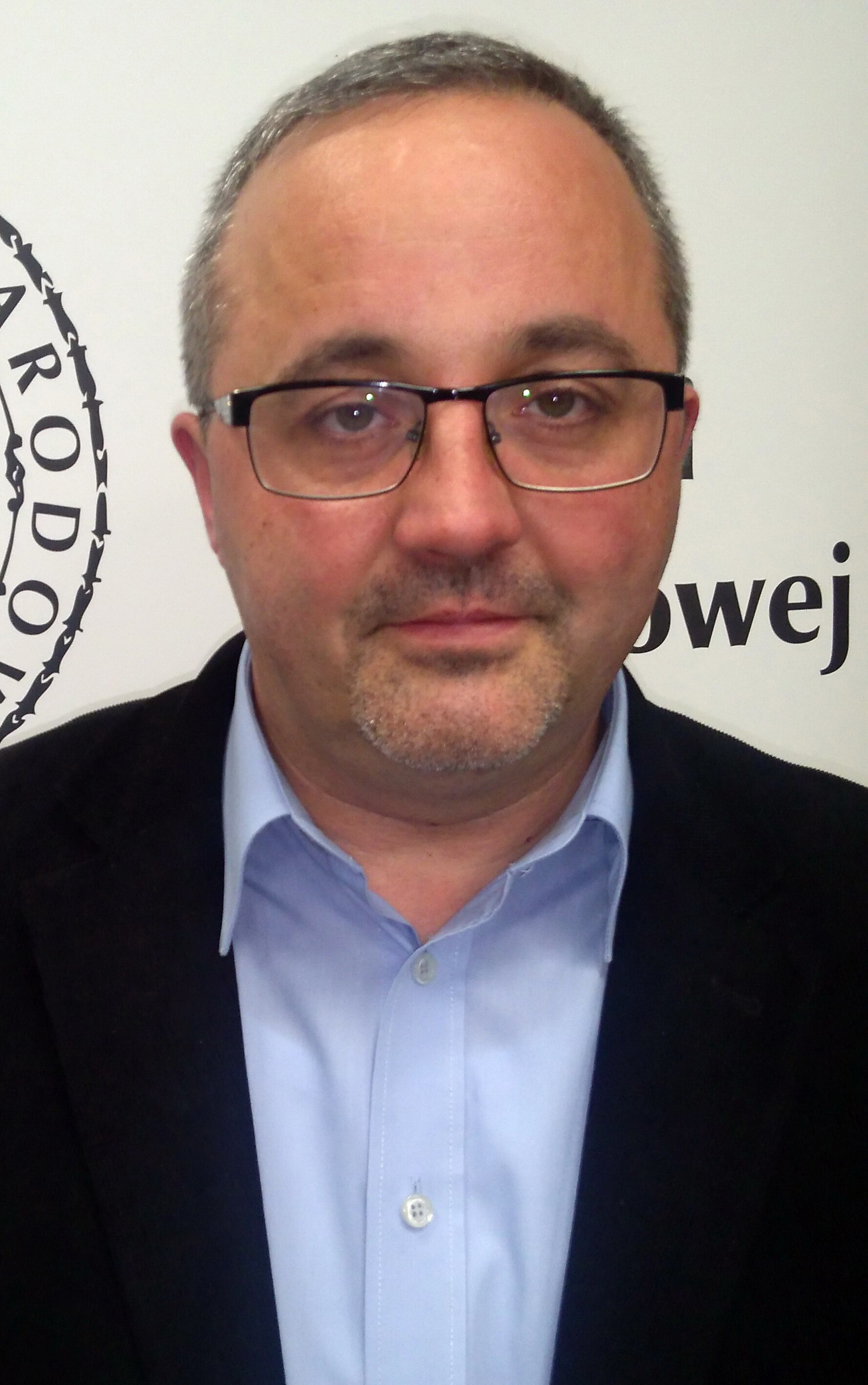
- Piotr Gontarczyk, 2018
- Born: 29 April 1970 (age 56); Żyrardów, Warsaw Voivodeship, Polish People's Republic
- Occupation: Historian
- Spouse: Aneta Gontarczyk

Academic background
- Education: University of Warsaw
- Thesis: The Polish Workers' Party: The Road to Power, 1942-1945 (2003)

Piotr Gontarczyk (born 29 April 1970) is a Polish historian with a doctorate in history and political science.

He is employed by the Polish Institute of National Remembrance. He specializes in the World War II history of the Polish communist movement, and in contemporary Polish history.

== Career ==
Gontarczyk studied journalism and political science at Warsaw University, in 2003 receiving a doctorate for his thesis, The Polish Workers' Party: The Road to Power, 1942-1945. In 2004 the thesis was honored with a Jerzy Łojek Award.

Gontarczyk has also studied at the Warsaw University Institute of History.

In 1998–2005 he worked in the office of the Commissioner for the Public Interest with its deputy commissioner, Judge Krzysztof Kauba. Since 2006 he is vice-director of the Office of Archivization of Documents at the Institute of National Remembrance. In September 2007 he was named deputy director of the Lustration Office at the Institute of National Remembrance.

In 2006 Gontarczyk identified Zygmunt Bauman (1925–2017) as a former agent, in 1945–53, of the Polish Security Service.

Gontarczyk is a former member of the academic corporation, Respublica.

In 2012 he criticized the Polish Foreign Ministry's recommendation of the book, Inferno of Choices: Poles and the Holocaust, about Polish antisemitism as an act of incompetence which may tarnish Poland's reputation. He was later accused of smearing the work of the same editors when disussing their later book Night Without End.

He has published articles in such scholarly publications as Zeszyty Historyczne, Arcana, Glaukopis, Dzieje Najnowsze, Zeszyty Historyczne WiN, Biuletyn Kwartalny Radomskiego Towarzystwa Naukowego, Biuletyn Instytutu Pamięci Narodowej, and Aparat Represji w Polsce Ludowej 1944–1989. He has also been published in many newspapers such as Życie, Rzeczpospolita, Gazeta Polska, Nasz Dziennik, Polityka, Gazeta Wyborcza, Uważam Rze, Do Rzeczy, Więź, Najwyższy Czas!, Tygodnik Solidarność, Ozon, Wprost, and Życie Warszawy.

== Przytyk pogrom ==
In 2000, Gontarczyk published a book about the Przytyk pogrom: Pogrom? Zajścia polsko-żydowskie w Przytyku 9 marca 1936 r. Mity, fakty, dokumenty (Pogrom? The Polish-Jewish Events at Przytyk on 9 March 1936: Myths, Facts, Documents). Jerzy Tomaszewski, praises Gontarczyk for efforts aiming at describing in details the events, and his critical approach to press reports, but criticizes him for restricting sourcing to almost exclusively on Polish legal and administrative documentation, seeing Polish, Jewish and American publications as being based almost exclusively on the prewar Jewish press and on books published in the communist period. According to Tomaszewski, this rejection was irrational and wrong, narrowing the scope of information on the subject.

== Jedwabne Pogrom ==
In 2001, Gontarczyk wrote that the earlier involvement of some Jews in communist atrocities during the World War II Soviet occupation of Poland cannot excuse the 10 July 1941 Jedwabne pogrom, even if that involvement contributed to anti-Jewish violence. Gontarczyk criticized historian Jan T. Gross' 2001 book, Neighbors: The Destruction of the Jewish Community in Jedwabne, Poland, describing the Jedwabne pogrom. Gontarczyk criticized Gross for giving different weight to witness statements based on the witnesses' ethnicities, for showing a lack of objectivity, and for treating witness statements as reliable solely on the basis of whether the witness had been at risk of becoming a Holocaust victim. According to Gontarczyk, this approach contravenes established procedure in history studies, where every statement should be judged objectively. He also pointed out that Gross ignored the relations that existed between Poland's Jewish and Polish populations under Soviet occupation. Gontarczyk placed responsibility for the Jedwabne pogrom at the doorstep of two criminal ideologies, Nazism and communism, and supported the exhumation of the Jewish victims' bodies, which was opposed by many Jews on religious grounds.

== Wałęsa controversy ==
In 2008, Gontarczyk and Sławomir Cenckiewicz published a book, SB a Lech Wałęsa. Przyczynek do biografii (transl. The Polish Security Service and Lech Wałęsa: Contributions toward a Biography). It caused a major controversy in Poland. Gontarczyk and Cenckiewicz argued that in the 1970s the Solidarity leader and later President of Poland Lech Wałęsa was a secret informant of the Polish communist Security Service. Michael Szporer wrote that the book should have been more nuanced in its judgments of anticommunist leaders, and that it unfairly singled out Wałęsa. Professor Wlodzimierz Suleja named Gontaryczk's book as one of the most important biographies in recent historiography in Poland.

== Personal life ==
Gontarczyk is married to Aneta Gontarczyk. In 2009, Gontarczyk, who had worked for the Military Intelligence Services verification commission, had her security clearance revoked. According to Gontarczyk, this was political retribution by Donald Tusk's administration for Gontarczyk's book about Lech Wałęsa.

== Books ==
- Tajne oblicze GL-AL, PPR. Dokumenty (1997–1999) ISBN 83-87654-03-5 - co-author
- Pogrom? Zajścia polsko-żydowskie w Przytyku 9 marca 1936 r. Mity, fakty, dokumenty (2000), ISBN 83-909046-4-0
- Polska Partia Robotnicza. Droga do władzy 1941-1944 (2003), ISBN 83-60335-75-3
- Tajny współpracownik "Święty" (2005) ISBN 83-919221-8-9
- Kłopoty z historią (2006) ISBN 83-60533-03-2
- SB a Lech Wałęsa. Przyczynek do biografii (2008) ISBN 83-60464-74-X (with Sławomir Cenckiewicz)
- Najnowsze kłopoty z historią. Publicystyka z lat 2008-2012 (2013)
