= Samuel Kassow =

American historian (born 1946)

- Born: Samuel D. Kassow; October 3, 1946 (age 79); Stuttgart, Baden-Württemberg, Germany
- Education: Watkinson School; Trinity College (BA); London School of Economics (MSc); Princeton University (PhD)
- Occupation: Historian
- Spouse: Lisa Pleskow Kassow

Samuel D. Kassow (born October 3, 1946) is an American historian of the history of Ashkenazi Jewry.

== Early life ==
Kassow was born in a displaced persons' camp in Stuttgart, Germany. His mother survived because she, along with her sister, was hidden in a dug-out underneath a barn on a classmate's family's farm; his father was arrested by the Soviets and spent the duration of the war in a Soviet prison camp. Kassow grew up in New Haven, Connecticut.

== Education ==
Kassow graduated from the Watkinson School in Hartford, Connecticut in 1962. In 1966, he earned his B.A. from Trinity College, Hartford, Connecticut. In 1968, Kassow earned a M.Sc. from the London School of Economics. In 1976, he earned a Ph.D. from Princeton University.

== Career ==
Kassow was the Charles Northam Professor at Trinity College for many years, until his retirement in 2025.

Kassow was a consultant to the Museum of History of the Polish Jews, which opened on the site of the Warsaw Ghetto, and was responsible for two of the eight core exhibitions.

In his book, Who Will Write Our History? Rediscovering a Hidden Archive From the Warsaw Ghetto, Kassow speaks about the importance of preserving historical documents and the past. He describes the historical events going on during World War II in the 1940s that affected and eventually eliminated the Warsaw Ghetto. His main focus is the Ringelblum Archive created in absolute secrecy by a small group of people that lived in the Warsaw Ghetto which were uncovered and studied about ten years later.

In 2014, Indiana University Press and the United States Holocaust Museum published The Clandestine History of the Kovno Jewish Ghetto Police, with an introduction by Kassow.

His 2007 book Who Will Write Our History was adapted into a documentary film of the same title, directed by Roberta Grossman and produced by Nancy Spielberg. It was released in 2018.

== Books and articles ==
- Students, Professors, and the State in Tsarist Russia: 1884-1917, University of California Press, 1989. ISBN 0-520-05760-0.
- Between Tsar and People: the Search for a Public Identity in Tsarist Russia. Edith Clowes, Samuel Kassow, James L. West eds. Princeton University Press, Princeton, NJ 1991. ISBN 0-691-03153-3.
- The Distinctive Life of East European Jewry, YIVO, New York 2004
- Who will Write our History: Emanuel Ringelblum and the Oyneg Shabes Archive, Indiana University Press, 2007
- The Holocaust in The Cambridge History of Judaism Vol VIII pages 633-671, Cambridge University Press, 2018
- The Rudashevski Diary, introduction. The Jewish Quarterly, 2025

== Personal life ==
Kassow is married to Lisa Pleskow Kassow. She is a director of Zach's Hillel at Trinity College.
