= Dariusz Libionka =

Polish historian

- Born: Dariusz Marian Libionka; June 25, 1953 (age 73); Bielsko-Biała, Katowice Voivodeship, Polish People's Republic
- Occupation: Historian

Academic background
- Education: KUL
- Alma mater: Polish Academy of Sciences
- Thesis: „Kwestia żydowska” w prasie katolickiej w Polsce w latach trzydziestych XX wieku (1998)
- Doctoral advisor: Krystyna Kersten

Academic work
- Discipline: History
- Sub-discipline: Modern history
- Institutions: IPN; IFiS PAN
- Website: Dariusz Libionka publications on Academia.edu

Dariusz Marian Libionka (born 25 June 1963 in Bielsko-Biała) is a Polish historian affiliated with the Institute of National Remembrance (IPN) in Lublin.

== Life ==
Libionka graduated from the Catholic University of Lublin (KUL) and the School for Social Science of the Institute of Philosophy and Sociology of the Polish Academy of Sciences. His research interests include Polish-Jewish relations and Polish history after 1945, with special focus on the status of Poland's Jewish community in the 20th century: in the Second Polish Republic, in the General Government formed by Nazi Germany, and in the Polish People's Republic after World War II, and generally Polish-Jewish relations and Judaism in Poland.

From 1994 Libionka worked in the Polish Contemporary History section of the Institute of Philosophy and Sociology of the Polish Academy of Sciences, and since 2000 in the Bureau of Public Education of the IPN. In 1998 he obtained a Ph.D. degree with a dissertation on The 'Jewish Question' in the 1930s Polish Catholic Press.

His articles have appeared in Dzieje Najnowsze, Biuletyn ŻIH, Polska 1944/1945-1999, Tygodnik Powszechny, and Yad Vashem Studies.

== Bibliography ==
=== Books ===
- Polska ludność chrześcijańska wobec eksterminacji Żydów – dystrykt lubelski (transl. The Polish-Christian Population and the Nazi Extermination of Jews in Lublin District)
- Armia Krajowa i Delegatura Rządu wobec eksterminacji Żydów; Kościół katolicki, antysemityzm, Zagłada (transl. The Home Army, the Delegatura and the Holocaust; the Catholic Church, Antisemitism and the Holocaust)
- Editor, Aktion Reinhardt: The Extermination of the Jews in the General Government

=== Articles ===
- "Kwestia żydowska – myślenie za pomocą clichés. Przypadek Odrodzenia 1935-1939", Dzieje Najnowsze, no. 3, 1995.
- "The Catholic Church in Poland and the Holocaust, 1939-1945", The Holocaust and the Christian World, edited by C. Ritter, S.D. Smith, and I. Steinfeld, London, 2000.
- "Die Kirche in Polen und der Mord an den Juden im Licht der polnischen Publizistik und Historiographie nach 1945", Zeitschrift für Ostmitteleuropa – Forschung, no. 2, 2002.
- "Obcy, wrodzy, niebezpieczni. Obraz Żydów i "kwestii żydowskiej" na łamach prasy inteligencji katolickiej w latach trzydziestych", Kwartalnik Historii Żydów, no. 3, 2002.
- "Brakujące ogniwo. Sowiecka literatura antysyjonistyczna w Polsce przed i po Marcu 1968", Komunizm. Ideologia, system, ludzie, edited by T. Szarota, Warsaw, 2001.
- "Duchowieństwo diecezji łomżyńskiej wobec antysemityzmu i zagłady Żydów", Wokół Jedwabnego, edited by P. Machcewicz and Krzysztof Persak, Warsaw, 2002.

== See also ==
- List of Poles
