= Polish-Jewish Relations during the Second World War =

Historical essay by Emanuel Ringelblum

- Author: Emanuel Ringelblum
- Language: Polish
- Subject: Analysis of Polish-Jewish relations during World War II, particularly Polish attitudes toward the Holocaust
- Genre: Essay
- Published: 1943

Polish-Jewish Relations during the Second World War: Notes and Observations (Polish: Stosunki polsko-żydowskie w czasie drugiej wojny światowej. Uwagi i spostrzeżenia) is a historical essay by Emanuel Ringelblum, written in hiding in late 1943. It attempts to describe and evaluate Polish-Jewish relations during World War II, particularly Polish attitudes toward the Holocaust.

== Circumstances of the creation ==
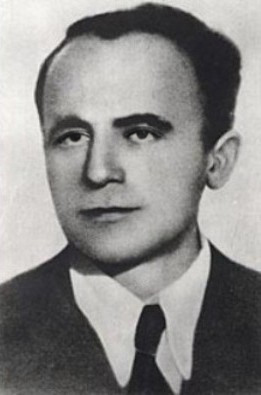
Emanuel Ringelblum

During the interwar period, Emanuel Ringelblum was among the most respected Jewish historians of his generation. One of his key research interests was Polish-Jewish relations. Following the establishment of the Warsaw Ghetto by the German occupiers in November 1940, Ringelblum and his family were confined to the ghetto. There, he gathered a group of several dozen Jewish writers, teachers, scholars, and activists, forming a clandestine research group known as "Oneg Shabbat" (Polish: Radość soboty, meaning Joy of the Sabbath). The organization's goal was to study and document the lives of Jews in occupied Poland.

"Oneg Shabbat" also sought to examine Polish-Jewish relations during the German occupation. In the autumn of 1941, Ringelblum drafted detailed outlines for a monograph on this topic. The authors aimed to address two questions: what did Poles know about the occupiers' antisemitic policies, and what were their attitudes toward them. The planned monograph was to analyze, among other things, the views and behaviors of the Polish population, political parties, and official institutions, as well as the attitudes of the Polish Blue Police and Warsaw municipal officials toward Jews confined in the ghetto. However, "Oneg Shabbat" could not complete this project. In the spring of 1942, the group learned of the Germans' mass extermination of Jews, shifting its priorities to documenting the Holocaust and informing the world of the genocide perpetrated by the Germans.

In late February 1943, Ringelblum, along with his wife and son, left the ghetto. From the autumn of 1943, the family resided in a secret underground bunker on Warsaw's Ochota district, located at the property of Polish gardener Mieczysław Wolski (known as the Krysia Bunker at 81 Grójecka Street). During this time, Ringelblum began writing his observations and reflections on Polish-Jewish relations during World War II, focusing on Polish attitudes toward the Holocaust. Writing in hiding, constantly fearing discovery, he lacked access to libraries, scholarly archives, and many critical documents (especially Polish and German ones). He also could not access materials collected by "Oneg Shabbat", which had been hidden before the Warsaw Ghetto Uprising. As a result, Ringelblum relied primarily on his own experiences, recalled observations, conclusions from earlier "Oneg Shabbat" work, accounts from other Jews, and articles from the underground press. He also maintained contact with Adolf Berman and other members of the Jewish resistance, who likely shared their experiences of cooperation with the Home Army and the Government Delegation for Poland, as well as information about the activities of Żegota. In the essay's introduction, Ringelblum noted that the views expressed were not solely his own but reflected "the opinions prevailing in certain progressive circles among the handful of survivors of the massacre of an entire nation".

Ringelblum acknowledged that, due to the limited source material, his essay did not meet the standards of a scholarly monograph. He stated in the introduction: "The material for this work is still very fresh, not yet ripe for the objective judgment of a historian. Many official and press materials are missing, which will need to be supplemented after the war". Elsewhere, he emphasized: "After the war, when archival sources become available and the balance of what remains of the 3.5 million Polish Jews can be drawn, it will be possible to comprehensively illuminate Polish-Jewish relations. Our notes on this subject are a document of the moment".

Polish-Jewish Relations during the Second World War was one of Ringelblum's final works. He entrusted the manuscript to Adolf Berman. Shortly afterward, in March 1944, the Krysia Bunker was discovered by the Gestapo, and the Ringelblum family, along with several dozen other Jews hiding there and their Polish caretakers, were executed in the ruins of the Warsaw Ghetto.

== Content ==
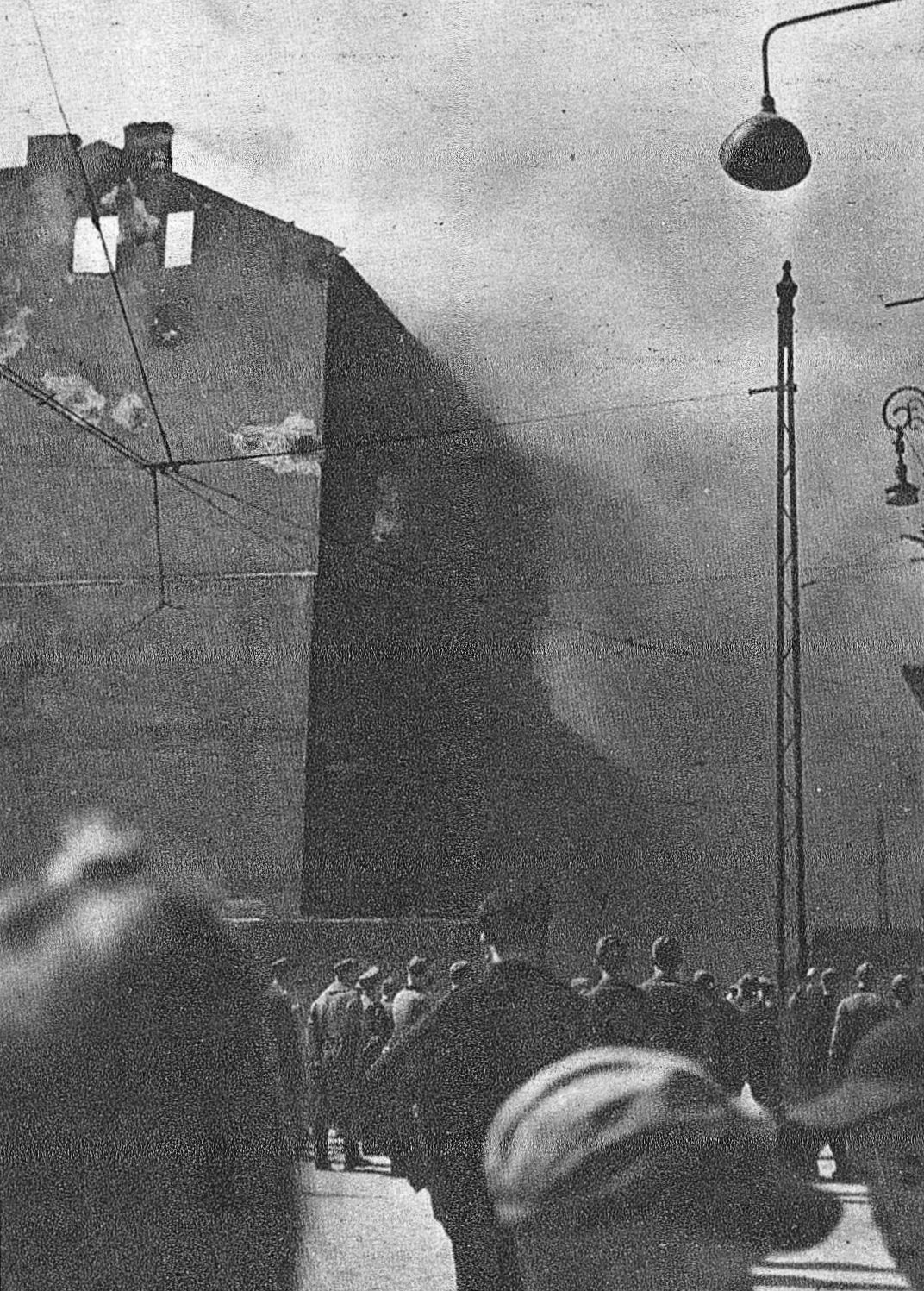
Warsaw Ghetto Uprising. Warsaw residents watching the burning ghetto

The manuscript of Polish-Jewish Relations consisted of three notebooks totaling 217 pages, written in Polish. It covers the period from the late 1930s to the autumn of 1943.

Ringelblum generally assessed the behavior of Poles during the Holocaust negatively, arguing that "Poland did not stand on the same level as Western Europe in the field of saving Jews". He attributed this largely to widespread antisemitism in pre-war Poland, fueled by National Democracy circles and tolerated by the ruling Sanation government. The essay devotes significant attention to the issue of blackmail, extortion, and denunciation of Jewish escapees for material gain. Ringelblum described instances of Poles seizing property from dispossessed and murdered Jews. He also documented the "Easter Pogrom" of March 1940, instigated by the Germans and carried out by the Polish social underclass. He quoted statements from Warsaw residents expressing satisfaction with the Germans' "final solution to the Jewish question". He particularly condemned the actions of the Polish Blue Police, which he held responsible for the deaths of "hundreds of thousands of Polish Jews caught with their complicity and herded into death trains".

Ringelblum also critically evaluated the stance of the Polish resistance. He argued that the Polish Underground State did not sufficiently combat blackmail and denunciation. It failed to counter antisemitic attitudes. It also provided insufficient military support to the Warsaw Ghetto Uprising. He claimed that, under the pretext of fighting common banditry, the Home Army often liquidated Jewish escapees from ghettos who resorted to stealing food in Polish villages to survive. He also accused the Catholic Church of indifference toward the Holocaust.

However, Ringelblum did not focus solely on negative phenomena. He emphasized that Polish society during the war was not monolithic, and shameful behaviors coexisted with heroic ones. Much of the essay is dedicated to Poles who saved Jews, including the Wolski family, on whose property Ringelblum's hiding place was located. He highlighted that in occupied Poland, any assistance to Jews was punishable by death, and fear of German reprisals, alongside antisemitic attitudes, was a primary factor hindering rescue efforts. He described the various dangers faced by Poles hiding Jews. He noted that, unlike many other European countries, there was no official collaboration in Poland. He also mentioned the activities of the Żegota, though he assessed that it fell short of expectations due to insufficient funding. He indicated that antisemitic sentiments in Polish society increased due to reports from Soviet-occupied territories, but he considered claims of widespread Jewish collaboration with the NKVD to be greatly exaggerated.

== Post-war editions ==
After the war, Adolf Berman handed the manuscript to the Jewish Historical Institute in Warsaw. Between 1958 and 1959, the essay was published in Polish in Biuletyn Żydowskiego Instytutu Historycznego. A few years later, it was translated into Yiddish in the same journal. The essay was also translated and published in German and English. A Polish book edition was published in 1988 by the Czytelnik Publishing House.

== Historical assessment ==
In the extensive historiography of the Holocaust, Ringelblum's essay represents a perspective that argues the majority of Polish society was satisfied with the Third Reich's "final solution to the Jewish question", and many Poles were willing to assist the Germans by denouncing and betraying Jews.

The essay was shaped by the specific atmosphere and circumstances in which it was written. Ringelblum strove for objectivity but occasionally expressed his anguish and distress over the destruction of the Jewish people unfolding before his eyes. American historian Samuel D. Kassow noted that "most, though not all, of Ringelblum's major theses and assertions have remarkably withstood the test of time". Artur Eisenbach emphasized that "Ringelblum's essay is an extremely valuable historical document and a solid scholarly study. It contains not only direct observations but also a perceptive assessment of the attitudes and behaviors of individuals and various groups within Polish society". Conversely, Władysław Bartoszewski and Zofia Lewinówna argued that while the essay contains valuable material, Ringelblum's isolation from the rest of Polish society (first in the ghetto, then in a secret bunker) led to "a certain distortion of perspective", particularly regarding conditions "on the Aryan side" and the realistic possibilities for Poles to aid Jews. Teresa Prekerowa noted that Ringelblum's limited access to sources meant the essay was "more a valuable resource for an intended publication than a cohesive, balanced whole". Historian Piotr Gontarczyk entirely dismissed the essay's historical value, claiming it "largely consists of unverified and false information".

Not all of Ringelblum's theses have been corroborated by post-war research. He was likely unaware of certain actions taken by the Polish government-in-exile and the Polish Underground State, such as the reports of Jan Karski. Samuel D. Kassow pointed out that later studies did not confirm Ringelblum's claim that Poland lagged behind Western Europe in efforts to save Jews. Kassow also suggested that Ringelblum overestimated the impact of pre-war antisemitic attitudes on Polish behavior during the Holocaust.

== Bibliography ==
- Kassow, Samuel D. (2010). Kto napisze naszą historię? Ukryte archiwum Emanuela Ringelbluma [Who Will Write Our History? Emanuel Ringelblum's Hidden Archive] (in Polish). Warsaw: Amber. ISBN 978-83-241-3633-9.
- Ringelblum, Emanuel (1988). Stosunki polsko-żydowskie w czasie drugiej wojny światowej. Uwagi i spostrzeżenia [Polish-Jewish Relations During the Second World War: Notes and Observations] (in Polish). Warsaw: Czytelnik. ISBN 83-07-01686-X.
