= Krysia Bunker =

Jewish hideout during German occupation of Poland

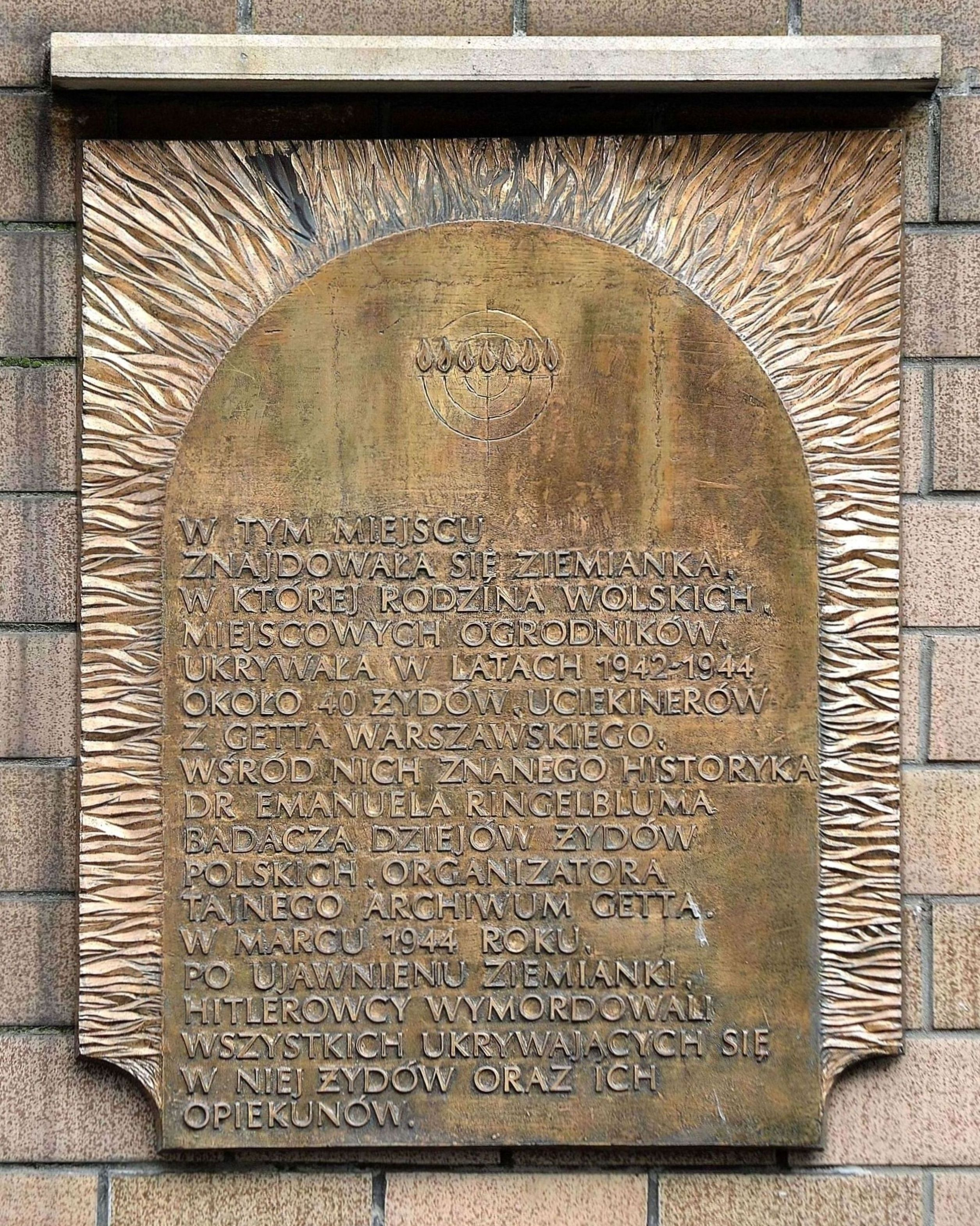
Plaque at 77 Grójecka Street commemorating the residents and caretakers of bunker "Krysia"

Bunker "Krysia" was an underground shelter located at Grójecka Street in Warsaw, where dozens of individuals of Jewish nationality hid during the German occupation.

Krysia was the largest and longest-standing Jewish hideout "on the Aryan side" of occupied Warsaw. Among those hiding there was the historian Emanuel Ringelblum with his wife and son. In March 1944, due to the denunciation, the shelter was discovered by Germans and the Blue Police, and the Jews hiding there were murdered. Their fate was shared by the Polish caretakers of the hideout.

== Origins ==
Bunker "Krysia" was established on the outskirts of Warsaw's Ochota district, on the property located at 81 Grójecka Street, (Note: Some sources give the address as Grójecka 84 (Prekerowa (1982, p. 183), Ringelblum (1988, p. 24)).) which belonged to the Polish gardener Mieczysław Wolski. (Note: In some sources, including prefaces and footnotes to Emanuel Ringelblum's works published in the 1980s, there is incorrect information that the shelter was built on the property belonging to Władysław Marczak and his family (Ringelblum (1988, pp. 24, 159) and Prekerowa (1982, p. 183)). This mistake resulted from the fact that Ringelblum, when writing about the Wolski family, used the pseudonym "family M.", intending to ensure their safety in case the notes fell into the hands of the Germans. After the war, Adolf Berman incorrectly deciphered this pseudonym, attributing it to the nonexistent Marczak family. Perhaps Berman confused Mieczysław Wolski with Ludomir Marczak – a Warsaw composer and socialist activist who hid several Jews in a hideout on Świętojerska Street for a period of time and was murdered by the Germans for providing them with assistance (Wroniszewski (2002, p. 84)).) Wolski's garden covered an area of over one hectare and occupied a closed area bordered by Grójecka, Wolna Wszechnica, and the eastern part of Opaczewska Street (now Stefan Banach Street). The property included a greenhouse and a two-story house where Mieczysław Wolski lived with his mother Małgorzata, sisters Halina and Wanda, (Note: Such information is included in the entry regarding the Wolski family in the Book of the Righteous Among the Nations. Józef Kazimierz Wroniszewski, on the other hand, states that the sisters of Mieczysław Wolski, who lived with him in the house at 81 Grójecka Street, were Wanda Wolska, Leokadia Borowiakowa, and Maria Czekajewska (Wroniszewski (1976, p. 463)).) and nephew Janusz Wysocki.

In 1942, with her mother's consent, Halina Wolska brought a Jewish girl named Wiśka (a seamstress by profession) to Grójecka Street. She hid in the Wolski family home, where she was treated as a member of the family. Presumably, this selfless assistance provided to the poor Jewish girl, as well as Mieczysław's connections with the Polish Socialist Party, led the Jewish Social Self-Help activists to propose to the Wolski family the idea of creating an underground hideout on their property.

After spending nearly a month with the Wolski family, Wiśka moved back to the Warsaw Ghetto, but returned after a few days. A week later, she went back to the ghetto, this time accompanied by Mieczysław Wolski. Two days later, they both returned to Grójecka Street with a plan ready for building the hideout and smuggling refugees. Since digging and arranging the shelter exceeded the capabilities of the Wolski family alone, several young Jews were hired for the construction, who were secretly smuggled to the "Aryan side" of Warsaw for this purpose. Part of the shelter's equipment was also prepared in the ghetto. Until the shelter was completed, the first group of Jews was hidden by the Wolski family in the basement of their house. The playful name "Krysia", derived from the word kryjówka (hideout), was given to the bunker by its caretakers and residents.

== Caretakers and residents of "Krysia" ==
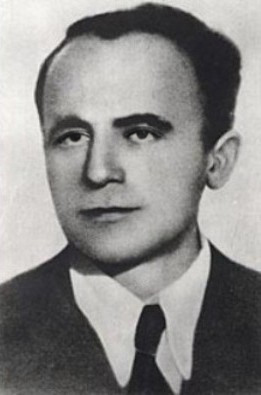
One of the tenants of "Krysia" was the historian Emanuel Ringelblum, creator of the underground archive of the Warsaw Ghetto

From 1942 to 1944, ten Jewish families (approximately 40 individuals) hid in the "Krysia" bunker – mostly well-off or from intelligentsia backgrounds. Among the residents of "Krysia" were predominantly young or middle-aged married couples, although there were also elderly individuals, teenagers, and small children. The bunker housed people such as lawyer Tadeusz Klinger, baker Gitter, restaurateur Rawicz, and Dr. Cendrowicz. However, the most famous tenant of "Krysia" was historian Emanuel Ringelblum, who hid there with his wife Judyta and 14-year-old son Uri. During his stay in hiding, Ringelblum wrote several works on the fate of Jews in occupied Poland, including a famous essay on Polish-Jewish relations during World War II.

The operation to hide Jews in bunker "Krysia" was the largest rescue operation of its kind in occupied Warsaw. As Jan Grabowski points out:

This type of bunker in Warsaw in 1944 was a complete rarity. In literature regarding hiding and rescue, there is no other equally substantial hiding place where the residents managed to survive for so long.

Contact with Ringelblum and the other members of the group was maintained by Adolf Berman, a representative of the Jewish National Committee. The costs of maintaining the bunker and its occupants were partially covered by the underground Council to Aid Jews (Żegota), and partially from funds deposited by the hiding Jews with the Wolski family. Each refugee moving into "Krysia" had to deposit 10,000 młynarkis upfront and be prepared to pay regular fees to cover the costs of food and other expenses. Nevertheless, witnesses emphasized the honesty and reliability of the Wolski family. To avoid suspicion that could arise from buying large quantities of food, they even opened a small grocery store.

The entire Wolski family took care of the bunker and its residents. The "brains" behind the rescue operation was Mieczysław Wolski, whose age is variously reported as 32 or 37. Wolski was responsible for supplying and securing the shelter and maintained contact with the Polish and Jewish resistance movements. In his essay on Polish-Jewish relations during World War II, Dr. Ringelblum dedicated many warm words to Wolski (in his notes, the gardener is referred to under the pseudonym "Władysław M."). He described him as a man with imagination, good for a drink and a joke, liking risk and gambling just for the sake of it. Ringelblum emphasized that Wolski was heart and soul devoted to his dearest beloved, Mrs. "Krysia". Meanwhile, Orna Jagur recalled that Wolski often visited the bunker, bringing news from the outside world and trying to keep the spirits of its occupants up.

Wolski's nephew, the teenage Janusz Wysocki (Note: Janusz Wysocki was the son of Stefania Wolska-Wysocka, the seventh child of Małgorzata Wolska and her deceased husband before the war. During the occupation, Stefania Wolska-Wysocka lived in Krynica-Zdrój (Wroniszewski (2002, pp. 83–84)).) (referred to as "Mr. Mariusz" in Ringelblum's notes), served as a lookout near the hiding place, warning the Jews in hiding if unauthorized persons appeared nearby. In case of danger, he whistled the first bars of a popular song, and later used the same signal to cancel the alert. Upon hearing this warning, the inhabitants of the bunker responded with the command "hide" (kryj się), eventually replaced by the word "Krysia". Wysocki also removed garbage and waste from the hiding place, usually with the help of one of the occupants of "Krysia", a Jewish boy named Szymek.

Wanda Wolska was in charge of food and other supplies and helped Janusz with disposing of garbage and waste. Halina Wolska handled correspondence and purchasing goods. 65-year-old Małgorzata Wolska (the matriarch of the family) tried to keep the refugees' spirits up and offered them good advice. (Note: Ringelblum wrote that Mieczysław Wolski was the brain of "Krysia", Janusz Wysocki its eyes, and Małgorzata Wolska its heart (Ringelblum (1988, p. 163)).) She also made efforts to establish contact with their missing or displaced relatives. The other Wolski sisters also became involved in helping the Jews in hiding: Leokadia Borowiakowa, Eugenia Warnocka, and Maria ("Maryna") Czekajewska. Leokadia ran the aforementioned grocery store, while Eugenia assisted Halina with various matters. Maria, a qualified nurse, provided essential medical assistance to the Jews in hiding when needed.

The inhabitants of "Krysia" established a committee among themselves, which took turns guarding the entrance or cleaning. An informal leader of the small community was someone known as "Borowski" (real name unknown), who mainly handled accounting and collected orders for provisions.

== Conditions in the bunker ==
The underground hideout was located in a secluded corner of the Wolski garden, under the greenhouse and a small gardening warehouse. It was shielded by a wall from Grójecka Street, which also separated the Wolski property from a small shallow plot at number 79. One of the walls of the shelter was supported by the foundations of the outbuilding at 77 Grójecka Street, where an inactive cosmetics factory belonging to the French company "Piver" was located.

"Krysia" had a rectangular shape with dimensions of approximately 7 meters by 5 meters and an area of about 28 square meters. Rows of beds were placed along both walls, which could accommodate 34 people (the remaining four refugees slept on folding camp beds). Between the beds, there was a row of interconnected wooden tables and long benches. Carbide lamps provided lighting. Behind a partition at the left end of the shelter, there was a small stove. The smoke was vented through a hole in the ceiling. Orna Jagur recalled that the outlet pipe was hidden in dense vegetation for camouflage, while other sources mention that the stove was connected to an unused chimney duct in the adjacent "Piver" building. A covered bucket served as a toilet. Even a tap with running water was installed in the shelter.

Compared to other Jewish hideouts in Warsaw, the conditions in "Krysia" could be considered relatively comfortable. However, life in the underground shelter was associated with a number of hardships. It was stuffy and consistently hot, and there was also a bed bug infestation. During the day, the occupants had to maintain absolute silence to avoid attracting the attention of the garden workers. Opening the hatch and letting in fresh air was only possible at night. Only then could the shelter residents also prepare a hot meal or engage in relatively unrestricted conversation. Some breaks in this monotonous existence were provided by small celebrations organized by the Jews and their caretakers on the occasion of "Krysia's" birthday or Christmas.

Staying in constant confinement – in constant danger and in the company of the same small group of people – inevitably led to psychological problems and mutual discord. Orna Jagur recalled that the tense atmosphere was often caused by the conflict-prone nature and authoritarian behavior of "Borowski". During their stay in the shelter, a 13-year-old girl named Basia committed suicide. Her body was secretly buried in the garden.

The hideout was threatened with exposure several times. Once, a Gestapo agent visited the Wolski house, asking if they were hiding Jews. Mieczysław managed to allay his suspicions at that time. Another time, one of the Polish garden workers began digging clay in the place where Basia's grave was located. However, the most dangerous situation occurred when one of the Jews forgot to close the opening in the greenhouse wall. The next day, a chicken entered the greenhouse through this opening, followed by a Polish female worker. She heard human voices coming from underground and consequently started spreading rumors that the Wolski orangery was haunted by ghosts. Wolski then invited a Blue Police officer to the greenhouse under the pretext of picking mushrooms, which temporarily silenced the rumors.

== Deconspiration of "Krysia" ==
=== Course of events ===
On 7 March 1944, German forces, accompanied by Blue Police officers, including officers from the 23rd precinct, invaded the Wolski garden. According to the account of Małgorzata Wolska, as recounted in Orna Jagur's memoirs, they easily – presumably thanks to a tip from an informant – found the hidden shelter under the greenhouse, where 38 Jews were hiding at the time. By firing shots into the air and threatening to introduce poisonous gases into the hideout, they demanded that the inhabitants immediately come out. All Jews complied with the demands except for lawyer Tadeusz Klinger, who committed suicide by taking cyanide. Wolski, severely beaten, managed to convince the Germans that his mother and sisters were unaware of the shelter in the garden. However, he was unable to save his nephew, who was pulled out of the shelter along with the Jews. The emptied shelter was then bombarded with grenades by the Germans.

The discovery of "Krysia" was described slightly differently by two officers of the Polish Criminal Police who participated in the action on Grójecka Street. In their post-war testimonies, there is no mention, among other things, of the presence of women from the Wolski family at the time of the police raid on the property. One of the officers' statements also suggests that Janusz Wysocki (referred to as the "gardener's son") was not pulled out of the hideout but, on the contrary, he was to be forced to enter the shelter and convince the Jews that any resistance would be futile.

The captured Jews, including Dr. Ringelblum with his wife and son, were taken to the Pawiak prison along with Mieczysław Wolski and Janusz Wysocki. A report later transmitted by the underground cell from Pawiak contained information that the group brought from the shelter on Grójecka Street consisted of 16 men and 24 women. According to Wanda Wolska's account, the Germans brought the severely beaten Mieczysław back to Grójecka Street on the same evening. It was the last time she saw her brother. Probably three days later, the residents and caretakers of "Krysia" were shot in the ruins of the Warsaw Ghetto.

During the German action, Halina Wolska-Michalecka was also arrested but was released shortly afterward. (Note: Józef Kazimierz Wroniszewski states that it was not Halina but Maria Czekajewska who was arrested as Wolski's sister. She was reportedly released from Pawiak after a two-day interrogation (Wroniszewski (1976, p. 464)).) The movable property belonging to the Wolski family and their wards was confiscated. Reports prepared by Blue Police officers collaborating with the Polish Underground State indicate that on March 7, among other items, furs, jewelry, and four kilograms of gold were found in "Krysia". Some clothes, deemed worthless by the Germans, were looted by residents of neighboring houses.

For the next three days, the property was guarded by the Blue Police. The surviving members of the Wolski family faced hostility and ostracism from neighbors.

From the group of "Krysia" residents, only Orna Jagur (Irena Grodzińska) and her husband Józef survived, as they had moved out of the bunker several months before its discovery.

=== Perpetrators of the hideout's detection ===
==== "Kommando for Wartime Manhunts" ====
From Jan Grabowski's findings, it appears that the discovery of "Krysia" was part of a large-scale operation aimed at Jewish hideouts on the "Aryan side" of Warsaw, conducted by German security services in the early months of 1944. (Note: Shortly before the uncovering of "Krysia", several individuals fell into the hands of the Germans, including Ludwik Landau (February 29), the chairman of Żegota Julian Grobelny (March 1), Żegota collaborator Jan Jaworski (March 2), and a group of Jews hiding on Koźla Street (March 3). Subsequently, the "search and seizure unit" also discovered a Jewish hideout on Orla Street (March 22), arrested 40 Jews in blockades in Żoliborz (late March or early April), and apprehended a certain number of hidden Jews during an operation conducted in Warsaw restaurants (April 2) (Grabowski (2014, pp. 89–90, 96–97)).) "Kommando for Wartime Manhunts" (Kriegsfahndungskommando) – a specialized section within the Polish Criminal Police, subordinate to the occupiers (Polnische Kriminalpolizei), played a crucial role in this operation, tasked with tracking down hidden Jews. (Note: The section was established in late 1943. Officially, it was called the "Kommando for Wartime Manhunts" (German: Kriegsfahndungkommando), but unofficially referred to as the "Jewish section" (Judenreferat). It was directly subordinate to the management of the Warsaw branch of the Polish Criminal Police. SS-Untersturmführer and police commissioner Werner Balhause led the section. In addition to him, the section included several German policemen, a few Volksdeutsche, two Ukrainians, and several Polish officers (Grabowski (2014, pp. 63–68)).) SS-Untersturmführer and police commissioner Werner Balhause, the head of this section, personally participated in the action at Grójecka Street, along with many of his subordinates. It seems likely that the discovery of the hideout was considered a significant success by the German police authorities. On the same day, a request for monetary rewards for fifteen Kripo officers was submitted.

==== Previous hypotheses about the perpetrator of the denunciation ====
Uncovering "Krysia" of likely did not become the subject of investigation by the structures of the Polish Underground State. After the war, the identity of the person whose denunciation led to the discovery of the hideout was the subject of many hypotheses.

The information about the execution of three death sentences by the underground Civil Special Court was published in the Biuletyn Informacyjny on 30 March 1944. One of those executed was Jan Łakiński, convicted of "complicity with the occupying forces in persecuting and tracking down Polish citizens of Jewish origin". It is this man who is identified in many publications as the author of the denunciation that led to the detection of "Krysia".

Łakiński (born in 1926) was the son of a pre-war senator, a displaced person from Greater Poland, and at the same time a well-known informant in Ochota. He was shot dead in front of the gate of the house at 1/3 Pługa Street by members of the Directorate of Underground Resistance liquidation group led by Stanisław Sękowski, alias "Michał", "Rugia". Some sources indicate that Łakiński was eliminated shortly after the exposure of "Krysia". However, records from the death registry of the parish of St. James clearly indicate that the informant was killed on February 25, eleven days before the discovery of the hideout. According to Dariusz Libionka, this fact automatically eliminates him from the circle of suspects. Libionka also emphasizes that so far, no mentions linking Łakiński to the discovery of "Krysia" have been found in underground press, documents, or correspondence. He also questioned Jan Grabowski's findings that Łakiński was one of the secret collaborators of Balhause's section, suggesting that due to the illegibility of the Polish-Canadian historian's handwriting, he confused him with another person – Kazimierz Lubarski.

Three independent sources, uncovered by American historian Samuel D. Kassow, claimed that the hideout was betrayed to the Germans by Mieczysław Wolski's former girlfriend, seeking revenge for the end of their relationship. Kassow also noted that reports of Wolski's romantic involvement and the denunciation by Łakiński may not be mutually exclusive. In his view, the girlfriend could have informed a known informant, such as Łakiński, about the hideout, who then passed on the information to the Germans or the Blue Police.

According to Jan Grabowski, it is not implausible that the exposure of "Krysia" was related to the arrest of one of the collaborators of Żegota, Jan Jaworski, which occurred five days earlier. Kripo agents found numerous documents, including a notebook with a list of names, in his possession.

However, Dariusz Libionka pointed out that reports from the Underground regarding common crime and the activities of the Blue Police, based on information provided by informants within the police ranks, unequivocally suggest that the discovery of "Krysia" was due to an act of betrayal. One report even mentioned that the informant was an unnamed officer of the Blue Police, who became suspicious due to the large food purchases made by the Wolski family.

==== Identification of the Perpetrator of the Denunciation ====
Adrian Sandak's findings, published in 2023 in the journal "Holocaust Studies and Materials", reveal that the perpetrator of the denunciation leading to the detection of "Krysia" was Marian Nowicki – a construction representative residing on Ogrodowa Street in Warsaw. The source of this information is a report from the counterintelligence section of the Warsaw District of the Home Army, discovered by the author. According to this report, Nowicki was identified as the denunciator by an unidentified individual referred to as "Czarnota," likely an informant of the Home Army within the ranks of the Blue Police or Kriminalpolizei.

The same report also indicates that Nowicki's denunciation was received by the "Kommando for Wartime Manhunts" on March 7, 1944, prompting an immediate reaction from Balhause and his men, indicating that the detection of "Krysia" was an improvised action – not preceded by longer observation. Nowicki was paid 38,000 młynarkis as a reward. Simultaneously, Balhause recommended that the Gestapo accept him as a permanent informer "with the right to arrest and track politically engaged Poles."

For unclear reasons, the Home Army counterintelligence most likely did not take any action to investigate and punish Nowicki for his role in the denunciation.

== Memory ==
On 27 April 1990, on the wall of the residential building at 77 Grójecka Street, which was constructed after the war near the location of the Wolski garden, a commemorative plaque honoring the residents of "Krysia" and their Polish caretakers was solemnly unveiled. The plaque was made of bronze and designed by Marek Moderau. The inscription engraved on the plaque reads:

At this location, there was a dugout where the Wolski family, local gardeners, hid approximately 40 Jews, refugees from the Warsaw Ghetto, between 1942 and 1944, including the renowned historian Dr. Emanuel Ringelblum, a researcher of the history of Polish Jews and the organizer of the secret archive of the Ghetto. In March 1944, after the dugout was discovered, the Nazis murdered all the Jews hiding there as well as their caretakers.

On 4 June 1989, five members of the Wolski family – Mieczysław Wolski, Małgorzata Wolska, Halina Wolska-Michalecka, Wanda Wolska-Szandurska, and Janusz Wysocki – were awarded the Righteous Among the Nations medal.

The story of the residents and caretakers of the hiding place at Grójecka Street was depicted in the documentary film titled Krysia (written and directed by Wiktor Skrzynecki, produced in 1990).

The bunker "Krysia" including the scene of its discovery in March 1944, was featured in the fictionalized documentary film Who Will Write Our History? from 2018 (directed by Roberta Grossman), dedicated to the history of the Ringelblum Archive group.

On 9 September 2021, at the initiative of the local Association of Ochota Residents, the Warsaw City Council named the neighborhood green space after the Wolski Family, which currently exists in the place where their house and garden were located during the war.

== Bibliography ==
- Borzymińska, Zofia (2003). Żebrowski, Rafał (ed.). Polski Słownik Judaistyczny. Vol. II. Warsaw: Prószyński i S-ka. ISBN 83-7255-175-8.
- Grabowski, Jan (2014). "Tropiąc Emanuela Ringelbluma. Udział polskiej Kriminalpolizei w "ostatecznym rozwiązaniu kwestii żydowskiej"". Zagłada Żydów. Studia i Materiały. 10. Warsaw: Centrum Badań nad Zagładą Żydów IFiS PAN. ISSN 1895-247X.
- Gutman, Israel, ed. (2009). Księga Sprawiedliwych wśród Narodów Świata. Ratujący Żydów podczas Holocaustu: Polska. Vol. II. Kraków: Jad Waszem. ISBN 978-83-87-832-59-9.
- Hanasz, Marian, ed. (2005). Goldmanka. W kręgu szkoły. Warsaw: Stowarzyszenie Wychowanków Gimnazjum i Liceum im. Stefana Batorego w Warszawie. ISBN 83-922142-1-8.
- Jagur, Orna (1997). Bunkier "Krysia". Łódź: Oficyna Bibliofilów. ISBN 83-86058-75-7.
- Kassow, Samuel D. (2010). Kto napisze naszą historię? Ukryte archiwum Emanuela Ringelbluma. Warsaw: Wydawnictwo Amber. ISBN 978-83-241-3633-9.
- Libionka, Dariusz (2018). "Polska Podziemna wobec szantażystów i szmalcowników. Korekta obrazu". Zagłada Żydów. Studia i Materiały. 14. Warsaw: Centrum Badań nad Zagładą Żydów IFiS PAN. ISSN 1895-247X.
- Paulsson, Gunnar S. (2009). Utajone miasto. Żydzi po aryjskiej stronie Warszawy (1940–1945). Kraków: Znak. ISBN 978-83-240-1252-7.
- Prekerowa, Teresa (1982). Konspiracyjna Rada Pomocy Żydom w Warszawie 1942–1945. Warsaw: Państwowy Instytut Wydawniczy. ISBN 83-06-00622-4.
- Ringelblum, Emanuel (1988). Stosunki polsko-żydowskie w czasie drugiej wojny światowej. Uwagi i spostrzeżenia. Warsaw: Czytelnik. ISBN 83-07-01686-X.
- Sandak, Adrian (2023). "Tajemnica donosu na bunkier "Krysia" odkryta". Zagłada Żydów. Studia i Materiały. 19. Warsaw: Centrum Badań nad Zagładą Żydów IFiS PAN. ISSN 1895-247X.
- Sędłak, Beata. "I wyjdą na górę do słońca..." fotoochota.waw.pl. Archived from the original on 2019-11-28.
- Wroniszewski, Józef Kazimierz (1976). Ochota 1939–1945. Warsaw: Wydawnictwo MON.
- Wroniszewski, Józef Kazimierz (2002). Ochota Okęcie. Przewodnik historyczny po miejscach walk i pamięci z lat 1939–1944. Warsaw: Fundacja "Wystawa Warszawa Walczy 1939–1945" and Wydawnictwo "Askon". ISBN 83-87545-27-9.
