= Roberta Grossman =

American filmmaker (born 1959)

Roberta Grossman is an American filmmaker. Her documentaries range from social justice inquiries to historical subjects with a focus on Jewish history.

== Early life and education ==
Roberta Grossman was born and raised in Los Angeles, California. She graduated from the University of California, Berkeley with a major in History and earned her MA in Producing from the American Film Institute Center for Advanced Film Studies in Los Angeles. She considered obtaining a PhD and embarking on an academic career, but regarded making documentaries as a more effective way to convey history and engage with historical subjects.

== Career ==
Grossman makes documentary films on topics and themes ranging from social justice inquiries to historical subjects with a focus on Jewish history.

She released her first film in 1983, a biography of blues singer-songwriter Sippie Wallace called Sippie. The film was co-directed with Michelle Paymar.

In 1995, Grossman produced and co-wrote Jack Leustig’s 500 Nations, an 8-hour CBS mini-series on the history of Native Americans. Executive producers were Jim Wilson and Kevin Costner. In the following years, she created several more historical documentaries for TV, including In the Footsteps of Jesus for The History Channel, The History of Sex and Rock and Roll for VH1, Special Report: Las Vegas for MSNBC, Christianity: The First 1000 Years, Mysteries of the Bible: Judas, Heroines of the Hebrew Bible for A&E and Women on Top for AMC.

In 1999, Grossman founded the non-profit production company Katahdin Productions together with Lisa Thomas. Katahdin released its first feature film in 2005, Homeland: Four Portraits of Native Action. Music from the movie, "Sacred Ground: A Tribute to Mother Earth" won the 2005 Grammy for Best Native American Album.

In 2008, Katahdin released Blessed Is the Match: The Life and Death of Hannah Senesh. The film was produced by Marta Kauffman, written by Sophie Sartain and directed by Grossman and told the story of Hannah Senesh, a World War II era poet and diarist who parachuted behind enemy lines to rescue her mother and other Hungarian Jews. It won the audience award at 13 Jewish film festivals, was broadcast on PBS, nominated for a Primetime Emmy, and shortlisted for an Academy Award.

Grossman and Sophie Sartain’s Hava Nagila: The Movie was released in 2012. The film was produced by Marta Kauffman. The feature-length documentary traced the journey of the song, Hava Nagila, from Ukraine to YouTube. Released theatrically and screened at 80 Jewish film festivals, Hava Nagila: The Movie was either opening or closing night at more than half of those festivals.

Director Dyanna Taylor's film about her grandmother, the photographer Dorothea Lange, Grab a Hunk of Lightning, aired on PBS's "American Masters" in 2014 and was produced by Grossman.

She directed Above and Beyond (2015) for producer Nancy Spielberg. The feature-length documentary told the story of Jewish American World War II era pilots who volunteered to fight for Israel in its 1948 War of Independence, also establishing the Israeli Air Force. Interviews with pilots who flew these missions is one of the highlights of the film.

Grossman produced, wrote and directed a documentary about the secret archives of the Warsaw Ghetto during World War II. The archive, known as Oyneg Shabbos, was assembled and hidden under the leadership of historian Emanuel Ringelblum. The film, called Who Will Write Our History? is based on the book of the same name by historian Samuel Kassow of Trinity College in Connecticut. Grossman optioned the rights to the book and worked with Executive Producer Nancy Spielberg to raise money for the film.

Who Will Write Our History was released in 2018 to great acclaim. Featuring the voices of three-time Academy Award nominee Joan Allen and Academy Award winner Adrien Brody, the film was a New York Times Critic's Pick in 2019. It played in over 50 film festivals around the world, including Berlinale, Festa del Cinema di Roma, Palm Springs International Film Fest and the San Francisco Jewish Film Festival where it won the Audience Award. The film garnered numerous other awards on the festival circuit. On January 27, 2019, International Holocaust Remembrance Day, the film was simultaneously screened on over 600 screens in 62 countries around the world. The film was also broadcast on NDR, Arte and the Discovery Channel in early 2020 and continues to be screened and discussed by community centers, organizations, museums and more and on college and high school campuses around the world.

Also in 2018, Grossman co-directed with Sophie Sartain the Netflix Original Documentary Seeing Allred, about women’s rights attorney Gloria Allred, which premiered in competition at the 2018 Sundance Film Festival.

Along with producer Nancy Spielberg, Grossman is currently producing a documentary about photographer Roman Vishniac, directed by Laura Bialis. She is also collaborating with Sophie Sartain and Susannah Heschel on a feature documentary about her father, Abraham Joshua Heschel.

In 2020, Grossman received the Taube Jewish Peoplehood Award. The award honors Jewish men and women who have worked to foster pride in Jewish identity and heritage for new generations, making a uniquely Jewish contribution to global culture.

In 2021, along with Caroline Libresco, Grossman launched Jewish History Partners (JSP), a film funding organization with a mission to support filmmakers telling stories with Jewish themes. JSP was founded with lead funding from Steven Spielberg's Righteous Persons Foundation, the Maimonides Fund, and the Jim Joseph Foundation.

== Awards ==
- 1985 Chicago International Film Festival, Nominated Gold Hugo for Best Documentary “Sippie”
- 2005 Santa Barbara International Film Festival, Won, Best Documentary Feature for “Homeland: Four Portraits of Native Action”
- 2006 Fargo Film Festival, Won Best Documentary Feature for “Homeland: Four Portraits of Native Action”
- 2010 “Blessed Is the Match” wins 12th film festival award. Audience Award, Best Documentary, Festival Internacional de Cine Judio Mexico
- 2014 Rutgers Jewish Film Festival, Audience Award for Best Documentary for “Above and Beyond”
- 2014 Hong Kong Jewish Film Festival, Best Documentary for “Above and Beyond”
- 2014 Philadelphia Jewish Film Festival, Audience Award for “Above and Beyond”
- 2015 Miami Jewish Film Festival, Audience Award for Best Documentary for “Above and Beyond”
- 2015 Palm Beach Jewish Film Festival, Audience Award for Best Documentary for “Above and Beyond”
- 2015 San Diego Jewish Film Festival, Audience Award for Best Documentary for “Above and Beyond”
- 2015 Atlanta Jewish Film Festival, Audience Award for Best Documentary for “Above and Beyond”
- 2015 Denver Jewish Film Festival, Best Documentary for “Above and Beyond”
- 2015 Charlotte Jewish Film Festival, Audience Award for Best Documentary for “Above and Beyond”
- 2015 Seattle Jewish Film Festival, Audience Award for Best Documentary for “Above and Beyond”
- 2015 Houston Jewish Film Festival, Audience Award for Best Documentary for “Above and Beyond”
- 2015 Jewish & Israeli Film Festival in Cincinnati, Audience Award for Best Documentary for “Above and Beyond”
- 2015 Jewish Film Festival Pittsburgh, Audience Award for Best Documentary for “Above and Beyond”
- 2018 San Francisco Jewish Film Festival, Audience Award for “Who Will Write Our History”
- 2018 Twin Cities Film Fest, Best Documentary for “Who Will Write Our History”
- 2019 Miami Jewish Film Festival, Audience Award for “Who Will Write Our History”
- 2019 Ferrara Film Festival, Best Documentary Golden Dragon Award for “Who Will Write Our History”
- 2019 Jewish Film Festival Pittsburg, Audience Award for “Who Will Write Our History”
- 2019 Denver Jewish Film Festival, Audience Award for “Who Will Write Our History”
- 2019 Monadnock International Film Festival, Best Documentary Feature for “Who Will Write Our History”
- 2019 Jewish International Film Festival, Audience Award for Best Documentary for “Who Will Write Our History”

== Filmography ==
Year	Film	Type	Credited As
1983	Sippie	Documentary Short	Co-Producer/Director
1992	Live! From Death Row	TV Movie	Production Manager
1995	500 Nations	TV Mini Series	Co-Writer/Series Producer
1997	Heroines of the Hebrew Bible A&E	TV Series	Director
1998	The Rise of Christianity: The First 1000 Years A&E	TV Movie	Segment Producer/Writer
1998	Mysteries of the Bible: Judas A&E	TV Series	Writer
1999	Medal of Honor	TV Movie	Series Producer
2000	The History of Sex and Rock and Roll VH1	TV Series	Producer/Writer
2000	In Search of History: The Man in the Iron Mask History Channel	TV Series	Producer/Writer
2000	Escape: True Stories of Suspense	TV Series	Producer
2001	From the Waist Down: Men, Women and Music	TV Mini Series	Producer
2002	Special Report Las Vegas MSNBC	TV Movie Documentary	Producer/Writer
2003	In the Footsteps of Jesus The History Channel	TV Movie Documentary	Producer/Writer
2003	Women on Top AMC	TV Movie Documentary	Producer
2005	Fortune Files 2: By the Numbers	TV Documentary	Co-Exec.Producer
2005	Homeland: Four Portraits of Native Action	Documentary	Producer/Director
2008	Blessed is the Match: The Life and Death of Hannah Senesh	Documentary	Producer/Director
2010	Native Century	TV Series	Producer
2012	Hava Nagila: The Movie	Documentary	Producer/Director
2014	Grab a Hunk of Lightning: Dorothea Lange	Documentary	Producer
2015	Above and Beyond	Documentary	Director
2018	Seeing Allred	Documentary	Co-Director/Producer
2018	Who Will Write Our History	Documentary	Director/Producer
