= Wincenty Strohe =

Polish traitor

Wincenty Strohe (1888 – ?) was a Polish Nazi collaborator and member of the Blue Police, the police force in the General Government, Poland.

During World War I he served in the Imperial-Royal Landwehr of the Austro-Hungarian Empire After Poland regained independence he served in the Polish Army. He served in the 8th Gendarmerie Squadron in Toruń. During World War II he stayed in the territory of the General Government and joined the Polish General Government Police. He became the commander of the Police School, which was established on October 1, 1941, in Nowy Sącz.
