= 500 Nations =

- Genre: Historical documentary
- Created by: Jack Leustig
- Written by: Jack Leustig, Roberta Grossman, Lee Miller (head of research), and W. T. Morgan, with John M. D. Pohl
- Presented by: Kevin Costner
- Voices of: Eric Schweig, Gordon Tootoosis, Wes Studi, Cástulo Guerra, Tony Plana, Edward James Olmos, Patrick Stewart, Gary Farmer, Tom Jackson, Tantoo Cardinal, Dante Basco, Sheldon Peters Wolfchild, Tim Bottoms, Michael Horse, Graham Greene, Floyd Red Crow Westerman, Amy Madigan, Frank Salsedo, and Kurtwood Smith
- Narrated by: Gregory Harrison
- Country of origin: United States
- Original language: English
- No. of seasons: 1
- No. of episodes: 8

Original release
- Network: CBS
- Release: April 20 – April 28, 1995

500 Nations is an eight-part American documentary television series that was aired on CBS in 1995 about the Native Americans of North and Central America. It documents events from the Pre-Columbian era to the end of the 19th century. Much of the information comes from text, eyewitnesses, pictorials, and computer graphics. The series was hosted by Kevin Costner, narrated by Gregory Harrison, and directed by Jack Leustig. It included the voice talents of Eric Schweig, Gordon Tootoosis, Wes Studi, Cástulo Guerra, Tony Plana, Edward James Olmos, Patrick Stewart, Gary Farmer, Tom Jackson, Tantoo Cardinal, Dante Basco, Sheldon Peters Wolfchild, Tim Bottoms, Michael Horse, Graham Greene, Floyd Red Crow Westerman, Amy Madigan, Frank Salsedo, and Kurtwood Smith. The series was written by Jack Leustig, Roberta Grossman, Lee Miller (head of research), and W. T. Morgan, with John M. D. Pohl.

The documentary series is based on the eponymous 480-page book by Alvin M. Josephy Jr., published in 1994. The documentary re-aired on Discovery Times in 2006.

== Episodes ==
=== Episode 1: Wounded Knee Legacy and the Ancestors ===
The series begins "where our story ends" with eyewitness accounts of Wounded Knee. The Ancestors next offers excerpts from Native American Creation stories, then explores three early North American cultures, including the 800-room Pueblo Bonito in the arid southwest, the Cliff Palace at Mesa Verde and Cahokia, the largest city in the U.S. before 1800.

=== Episode 2: Mexico ===
A history of the native nations of Mexico from pre-Columbian times, through the period of European contact and colonization, including the rise and fall of the Toltecs and the growth of Tenochtitlan, the capital of the Aztec Empire.

=== Episode 3: Clash of Cultures ===
As Native nations defy a plundering advance of Spanish expeditions in the Caribbean and what will become the southeastern United States, two undefeatable attacks, muskets and disease, cause thousands of deaths.

=== Episode 4: Invasion of the Coast ===
Tensions rise as more foreigners arrive in North America, and affect the lives of native peoples. In Jamestown, the story of the Powhatan princess, Pocahontas, unfolds. Thanksgiving at Plymouth leads to a bloody colonial Indian war in 1675.

=== Episode 5: Cauldron of War ===
European powers fought to control American resources, turning native homelands into a Cauldron of War. Many indigenous nations side with France, but when the defeated country leaves its native allies vulnerable, a determined leader, Pontiac, rises to prominence.

=== Episode 6: Removal ===
Being forced to follow the Trail of Tears displaces Native Americans even though they adopt American ways. Shawnee leader Tecumseh sparks a return to traditional ways but the Indian Removal Act is enforced in 1830. Many stoically accept; others resist.

=== Episode 7: Roads Across the Plains ===
Lifestyles of native peoples of the Great Plains end as American settlers destroy huge buffalo herds. Though native leaders pursue peace, they are massacred at Sand Creek. The massacre provokes severe repercussions.

=== Episode 8: Attack on Culture ===
Legislative attacks on native ways included the disbanding of communal land. Today, native cultures are allowed to renew, and to remember the lifestyles of America's original people, and the hardships they endured.

== Software ==
Microsoft released an educational computer game based on the documentary, and its "rich multimedia content" also covered the experiences of indigenous people with Europeans in Canada and Alaska.
