= Raphael Mahler =

Galician-born Jewish historian (1899–1977)

- רפאל מהלר
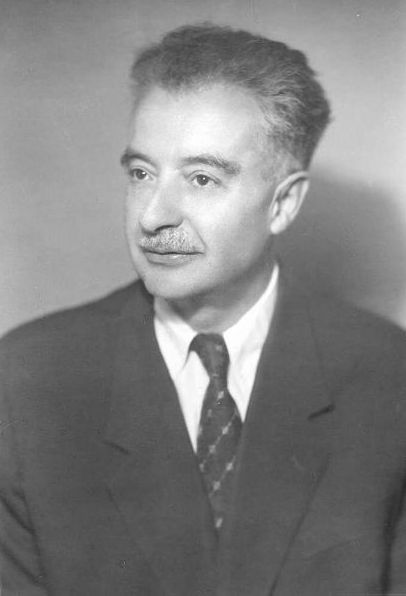
- Mahler in 1958.
- Born: 15 August 1899; Nowy Sącz, Galicia, Austria-Hungary
- Died: 4 October 1977 (aged 78); Ramat Gan, Israel
- Awards: Israel Prize (1977)

Academic background
- Education: University of Vienna

Academic work
- Discipline: History
- Sub-discipline: Jewish history; Economic history
- Institutions: Tel Aviv University
- Notable works: The Jews in Old Poland; Jews in Old Poland in the Light of Statistics; Jews in Poland Between the Two World Wars; History of the Jewish People in Modern Times

Raphael Mahler (Hebrew: רפאל מהלר; August 15, 1899 – October 4, 1977) was a Galician-born Jewish historian who worked in Poland, America, and Israel.

== Life ==
Mahler was born on August 15, 1899, in Nowy Sącz, Galicia, Austria-Hungary, the son of a scholarly and business family. He attended the Nowy Sącz municipal public school, where he was the only Jewish student, went to the Nowy Sącz yeshiva, and studied with private tutors.

Mahler left the yeshiva when he was fifteen and finished his secondary education in Kraków. He then went to Vienna, where he studied history and philosophy at the University of Vienna and the Talmud at the rabbinical assembly. He received his doctorate in 1922, with his dissertation on the sociological problems of progress. He then returned to Poland, where he taught history in Jewish secondary schools, participated in the Left Poale Zion, and promoted modern Jewish historical research. He and Emanuel Ringelblum founded the Jewish Young Historians Circle, which was later affiliated with YIVO's Historical Section. He was actively involved with YIVO as a researcher and editor.

From 1924 to 1937, Mahler taught general and Jewish history in the Gymnasium and the Lyceum "Ascola" in Warsaw. He was active in the Warsaw branch of the Polish Historical Society. He identified with the Jewish workers' movement since his youth. He contributed to and edited Der Yunger Historikes from 1926 to 1929, Bleter far Geshicte from 1934 to 1939, the YIVO yearbooks, Der Virtshaftliche Lebn, and Fraie Yungt. He also headed the Jewish Workers Educational Society in Poland (Geselshaft Ovent Kursn far Arbeter) until 1931, when the Polish government dissolved it.

In 1937, Mahler immigrated to America at the invitation of YIVO and settled in New York City. He worked as a lecturer in YIVO's research student courses, the Jewish National Labor Alliance's teachers seminary, and the Workmen's Circle's teachers courses. He was also a lecturer of the Herzliah Hebrew Teachers' Institute from 1938 to 1939, and in World War II he taught Jewish history at the Jefferson School for Social Studies and the School of Jewish Studies. He wrote extensively on Jewish history, specializing in the socio-economic theory of Polish Jewry, the history of Jewish social and religious movements, and Jewish historiography. Thirty of his articles were published in the Encyclopedia Judaica in Berlin, and he contributed articles to the Universal Jewish Encyclopedia.

In 1950, Mahler immigrated to Israel and lectured on Jewish economic history at the Tel Aviv School of Law and Economics. In 1959, he joined the Tel Aviv University faculty. An active member of Mapam, he was a doctrinaire Marxist scholar who believed economics and social conflicts were essential for understanding Jewish history. He wrote on Jewish history in Yiddish, Polish, German, Hebrew, and Yiddish. A bibliography of his work that was compiled in 1974 revealed over 500 publications. In 1977, he was awarded the Israel Prize for his contributions to Jewish scholarship.

Mahler wrote, among other works, Di Yidn in Amolikn Poyln in the publication Di Yidn by Poyln in 1946, Ha-Kara'im on the Karaites in 1946, Yidn in Amolikn Poyln in Likht fun Tsifern in 1958, Yehudei Polin bein Shetei ha-Milḥamot (Jews in Poland Between the Two World Wars) in 1968, and the article Torat Borochov ve-Shitato be-Yameinu Anu in Ba-Derekh in 1965. His major work Divrei Yemei Yisrael; Dorot Aḥaronim (History of the Jewish People in Modern Times) was only partially published.

Mahler died in Ramat Gan on October 4, 1977.
