= Executions in the ruins of the Warsaw Ghetto (1943–1944) =

Executions in the ruins of the Warsaw Ghetto (1943–1944) – mass executions of Polish Political prisoners and people of Jewish descent carried out secretly by German occupiers in the ruins of the Warsaw Ghetto.

The Germans shot prisoners brought from outside the ghetto in the "Jewish residential district in Warsaw" in the summer of 1942, but such executions became massive only in mid-May 1943, after the uprising in the Warsaw Ghetto had been suppressed and the district had begun to be systematically demolished. The genocide in the ruins of the ghetto was carried out continuously until the outbreak of the Warsaw Uprising in August 1944. SS and German police officers shot several thousand people there – Polish hostages (mainly prisoners of Pawiak prison and ordinary residents of the city detained during mass round-ups), as well as Jews captured on the "Aryan side".

== Origins ==
Warsaw was considered by the Germans to be the centre of Polish resistance against the Nazi "New Order". Although in the occupied General Government the former capital of Poland was degraded to the role of a provincial city, Warsaw still remained the centre of Polish political, intellectual and cultural life. It was also the seat of the authorities of the Polish Underground State and a place of functioning of particularly strong and well-organized structures of the resistance movement. Governor General Hans Frank wrote in his diary on December 14, 1943: "If we had not had Warsaw in the General Government, we would not have four-fifths of the difficulties we had to face. Warsaw is and will remain a focus of turmoil, the point from which unrest spreads in that country".

From the first days of the occupation, Germans imposed brutal terror on the people of Warsaw, directed primarily at the representatives of the Polish political and intellectual Elites, the Jewish community and people who were in any way connected with the activities of the resistance movement. Warsaw's Prisons and detention centres – Pawiak, the investigator's arrest at Daniłowiczowska Street, the Mokotów Prison, and the basements of Sipo's headquarters in Szucha Avenue – were filled with arrested people. Street round-ups, deportations to concentration camps and mass murders became daily occurrences. Executions of Political prisoners from Warsaw were usually carried out in secret in areas inaccessible to bystanders. The places of massacres were, among others: the Sejm gardens at Wiejska Street; Kabaty Forest; Swedish Mountains in Bemowo; Sękocin Forest near Magdalenka; Chojnów Forests near Stefanów; Laski, Wydmy Łuże and Wólka Węglowa on the outskirts of Kampinos; and above all – infamous Palmiry.

From the executioner's point of view, however, executions carried out in the Forests near Warsaw entailed certain risks and logistic problems. The discreet transport of convicts from Warsaw's prisons to places of execution located several kilometers from the city was a complicated and time-consuming operation. The protection of execution sites from unauthorized witnesses and escape of convicts also posed serious problems. The Germans had no guarantee that the inhabitants of the surrounding villages would not be able to find mass graves by accident or intention.

== First executions in the ruins of the ghetto ==
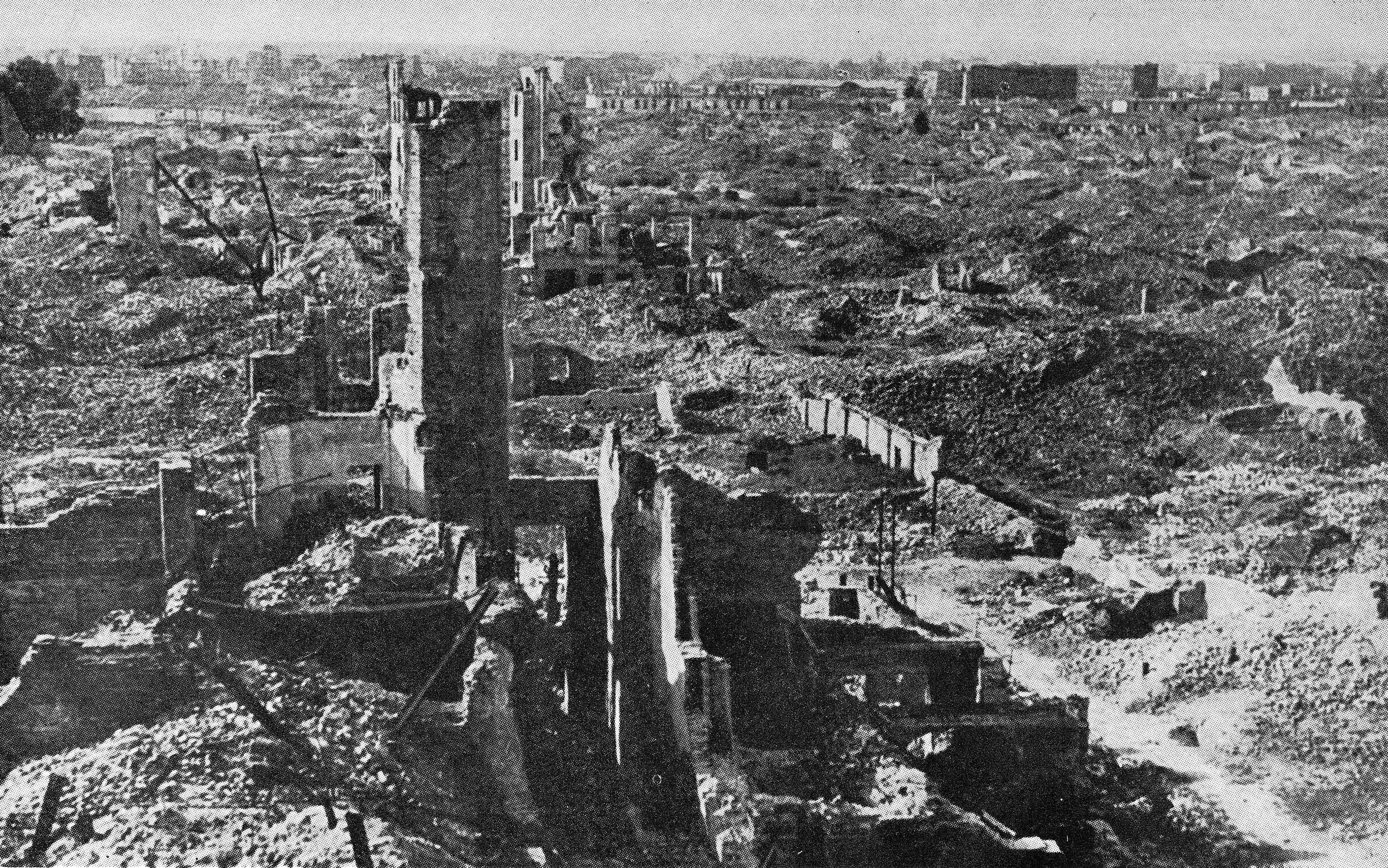
Ruins of the Warsaw Ghetto; north view from Courthouse at Leszno street, in the foreground is seen the ruins of houses: Leszno 52 and 50, photo taken in 1945.

Starting from June 1942, there were several cases when small groups of Poles, ranging from a few to several dozen, were murdered by the Germans in the Warsaw Ghetto, which at that time was completely isolated from the rest of the city. The bodies of the murdered were usually abandoned directly in the streets of the "Jewish residential district", where they were then taken care of by Jewish working groups, whose duties included cleaning the streets from the bodies of the dead inhabitants of the ghetto. They usually buried the corpses in the Jewish cemetery or in the "Skra" football field. Such executions took place on a larger scale during the great displacement operation in the ghetto (summer 1942), because in the conditions of general chaos, it was easy for Germans to hide the fact of the murder and to get rid of the victims' bodies unnoticeably. In the spring of 1943, the Germans finally shut down the Warsaw Ghetto by brutally suppressing the Warsaw Ghetto Uprising which had been started by the Jewish resistance movement. Areas of the former "Jewish residential district" were transformed by the occupying forces into a "stone-brick desert". The management of the Warsaw Gestapo came to a conclusion that the ruins of the ghetto might turn out to be a convenient place to carry out secret executions of Poles – this time on a massive scale. SS-Gruppenführer Jürgen Stroop, the then SS and Police Commander (SS- und Polizeiführer) for the Warsaw district, claimed that the author of this idea was Dr Ludwig Hahn, Commander of the German security police and security service in Warsaw. While in Mokotów Prison waiting for the trial, Stroop reported on talks with Hahn to his co-prisoner from the cell, Kazimierz Moczarski.

“Doctor Hahn said something like this: "Let's use Grossaktion to finish Poles as well. Many Jews died in the ghetto and will continue to do so. There are corpses everywhere, so if a few thousand more dead Poles arrive, nobody will be able to verify anything anyway" – reported by Jürgen Stroop.

From the point of view of the occupants, a number of factors spoke in favor of using the ruins of the ghetto as a place of mass executions. The district was directly adjacent to the Pawiak prison, where the vast majority of Polish political prisoners were detained. The ghetto walls and numerous German posts completely isolated the "stone and brick desert" from the rest of the city. Police patrols constantly hunted Jews hiding in the ruins, which explained the sound of shots coming from behind the walls. It was easy to bury or burn the bodies of the murdered in the ruins. Finally, in the summer of 1943, a German concentration camp – the so-called Konzentrationslager Warschau – began to operate in the area of the former ghetto (near Gęsia Street). Its premises and crew were used for carrying out executions, as well as its equipment (crematorium).

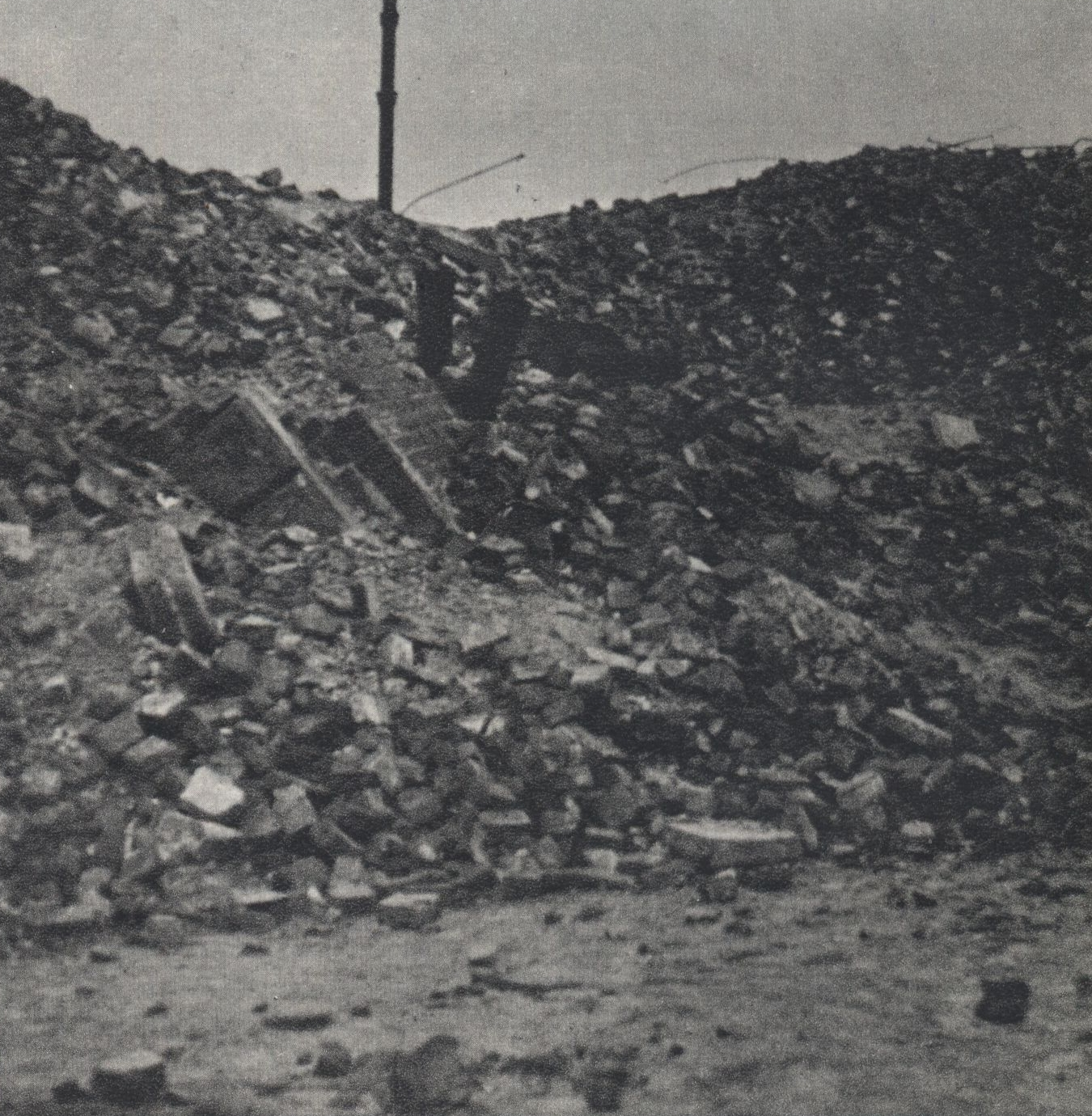
Ruins of the house at 27 Dzielna Street. In 1943–1944, thousands of Pawiak prisoners were murdered there.

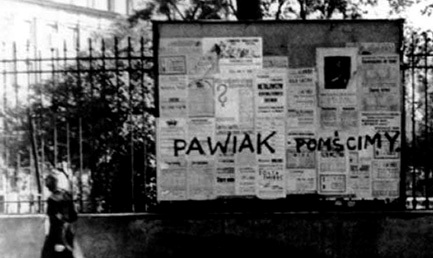
"We'll avenge Pawiak". An inscription made by scouts from the "Wawer" organization on a notice board placed on a fence of the BGK garden at Bracka Street.

The first execution of Pawiak's prisoners, carried out in the ruins of the Warsaw Ghetto, took place on May 7, 1943, i.e. before the end of the Ghetto Uprising. (Note: The destruction of the Great Warsaw Synagogue by the Germans, which is considered the official end of the uprising, took place on May 16, 1943.) At that time, 94 people were murdered in the gate of a tenement house at 21 Dzielna Street. From the end of May 1943, executions in the former "Jewish residential district" took place almost every day. Since then, the Germans had almost completely abandoned execution of convicts in forests near Warsaw and have significantly limited the deportations of Pawiak prisoners (and of other Warsaw prisons and jails) to concentration camps. Instead, Polish political prisoners were hastily and massively murdered in the ruins of the ghetto, often after only a few or several days of investigation or even without any investigation at all. Almost every day executions of several or a dozen Jews captured by the Germans on the "Aryan side", as well as Poles who hid them, took place there. The names of these victims were in most cases never established, as the captured Jews were not entered in the Pawiak's records at all. Instead, after a few hours, or at most a few days of their stay on the death row, they were executed in the ghetto. It was not uncommon for whole families, including women and children, to be murdered in the ruins.

Germans carried out the executions at various places in the former ghetto, but most often on the grounds of the property at 25 and 27 Dzielna Street, in the garden of the house at 29 Nowolipki Street and in the courtyard of the house at 19 Zamenhofa Street. Pawiak prisoners or other people brought from the city were also shot on the grounds of the Warsaw concentration camp (KL Warschau). The corpses of the murdered were burned (Note: It is probable that at the very beginning the bodies of the victims of some executions were buried by the Germans in the ground or buried in the cellars of demolished houses.) – most often on the grounds of the property at 45 Gęsia and 27 Pawia Streets or within the KL Warschau camp (on piles made of wooden parts of demolished houses or in the local crematorium). The corpses were burned by labor units composed of Jews - prisoners of the camp.

The information on German crimes provided to the outside by the members of the AK conspiracy employed as the Pawiak custodian staff was inevitably fragmented, so it is impossible to determine the exact dates and course of all the murders carried out in the ghetto ruins in the spring and summer of 1943. However, it is known that in the executions that were carried out almost every day a few to a dozen people died. There have been cases in which dozens or even hundreds of Poles and Jews have been murdered in individual executions. On May 29, 1943, a great massacre of Pawiak prisoners took place in the former ghetto, during which about 530 people were killed. The execution echoed widely in occupied Warsaw – it was then that the inscriptions "Pawiak pomścimy" (We'll avenge Pawiak) began to appear on a large scale on the walls of the city. On June 24, 1943, about 200 people died in the next big execution in the ghetto. On July 15, 1943, from 260 to 300 people were shot there – Poles and Jews arrested as a result of the so-called scandal of the Polish Hotel. The next day, 132 more prisoners of Pawiak were executed in the camp at Gęsia Street.

== Executions during Kutschera's rule ==
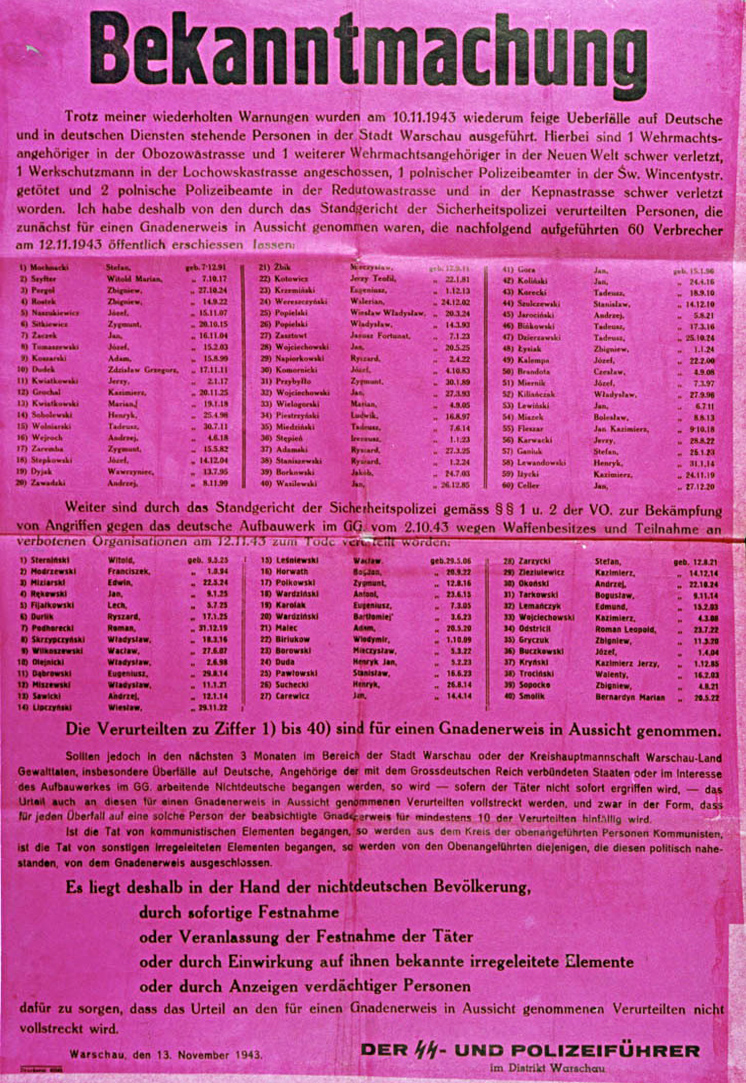
Announcement of the execution of 60 Polish hostages and a list of 40 new hostages taken by Nazi authorities in Poland, 13 November 1943

In October 1943 German terror against the people of Warsaw was dramatically intensified. The Germans intensified their efforts throughout the General Government to break the growing Polish resistance movement. On October 2, 1943, Hans Frank's ordinance "On combating attacks on the German work of reconstruction in the General Government" was announced. It sanctioned the principle of collective responsibility fully applied by the occupying power, providing, among other things, that "instigators and helpers are punishable as perpetrators" and that "an attempt to commit a crime is punishable as a committed crime". The only form of punishment provided for in the Regulation was the death penalty. In Warsaw, the intensification of the Nazi terror was also caused by the fact that SS-Brigadeführer Franz Kutschera took over the function of the SS and Police Commander for the Warsaw district (September 25, 1943). The new SS- und Polizeiführer advocated a hard hand policy towards the nations conquered by the Third Reich. He wanted to pacify Warsaw by means of mass executions of Hostages, carried out in retaliation for every anti-German act. However, executions were to be carried out not only in the ruins of the ghetto, but also in an open manner – on the streets of Warsaw. The Germans hoped that in this way they would be able to intimidate the capital's population and at the same time drive a wedge between the resistance movement and ordinary citizens.

The intensification of the occupant's policy was communicated in Warsaw by a wave of round-ups of unprecedented intensity, which fell on the city on October 13, 1943 and since then have been organized by the Germans almost daily – even several times during a single day and in many parts of the city. The first of numerous street executions took place on October 16, 1943, on Niedpodległości Avenue (at the corner of Madaliński Street). In order to have an appropriate psychological effect, names of the victims were read out by street megaphones, together with the announcement of shooting of the next group of hostages (named after them) in case of another anti-German attack in Warsaw. After some time, megaphone announcements were replaced by written announcements on the walls (Bekanntmachung). The infamous Posters, printed on pink paper and usually bearing the anonymous signature "SS and Police Commander for the district of Warsaw", appeared for the first time on the streets of Warsaw on October 30, 1943.

Mass roundups and executions, in which hundreds of innocent people were killed, shocked Warsaw. While German repressions were usually directed against specific social or political groups, the terror perpetrated by Kutschera was basically used in a random manner. Next to political prisoners arrested by the Gestapo, ordinary Warsaw residents who were accidentally detained during round-ups died in great numbers. However, while street executions naturally attracted public attention, the simultaneous action of secret elimination of hostages in the ruins of the ghetto took on a much larger scale. Between October 15, 1943 and May 15, 1944, the Germans executed almost 5000 people in the city and its immediate vicinity (about 270–300 people a week), of whom about 3800 were shot in the ruins of the ghetto. This means that there were 3–4 people murdered secretly in the ghetto per 1 person killed in a street execution.

At that time, executions in the ruins of the ghetto were carried out not only daily, but often even several times in a single day. Dozens or even hundreds of prisoners of Pawiak or ordinary Warsaw citizens detained during round-ups were repeatedly killed in single executions. One of the biggest executions in Pawiak's history, which lasted several hours until 4:00 am, took place during the night from October 17 to 18, 1943. Naked prisoners were led out of the prison in groups and shot with machine guns on the section of 36–42 Pawia Street and 37–42 Dzielna Street, about 600 people were killed. Rumors spread later in prison that the execution was so horrible that one of the SS soldiers did not endure the mental stress and committed suicide. On October 23, 1943, about 300 hostages, brought the day before from Praga, were executed in the ruins. Mass executions also took place on November 12 and 13 (about 240 and 120 victims, respectively), December 9 (about 146 victims, including 16 Jewish women with one young child), December 14 (about 230 victims), December 16 (about 100 victims), January 13, 1944 (about 260 victims) and January 28 (about 170–180 victims).

At the same time, according to the information provided by the underground cells operating in Pawiak, in November 1943, the Germans started to erase the traces of previous executions and evidence of crimes committed while the Warsaw Ghetto was still in existence. Labour units composed of KL Warschau prisoners began to extract bodies from mass graves hidden in the former ghetto or in the Jewish cemetery under the supervision of the Germans. The exhumed corpses were then burned or blasted with explosives. According to Regina Domańska, on November 17, 1943, Germans gathered about 300 men in the ruins of one of the houses in the former ghetto, and then blew up the building.

On February 1, 1944, soldiers of the "Pegasus" unit belonging to Kedyw AK carried out a successful attack on Kutschera in Ujazdów Avenue. Most of the victims of the retaliatory executions carried out by the Germans in the following days were murdered in the ruins of the ghetto. As early as February 2, Germans shot 300 Polish hostages, 100 of whom were executed in a street execution at the corner of Ujazdów and Chopin Avenues (near the assassination point), and the remaining 200 in the ghetto. Another mass executions in the ruins took place on February 3 (about 150 victims), February 10 (about 330 victims) and February 15 (about 210 victims, including 18 women).

== Last months of the occupation ==
After the death of Kutschera, the German terror against people of Warsaw was clearly reduced. The Germans decided not to carry out street executions, and stopped informing about the execution of hostages by means of megaphone announcements and posters. One could clearly feel the desire of the occupants not to give Poles the opportunity to manifest patriotic feelings. However, the extermination process in the ruins of the ghetto continued on a full scale. In the spring of 1944, dozens or even hundreds of Pawiak prisoners or people brought from the city for execution were being killed almost daily. On February 22, 1944, about 312 people were executed in the ruins of the ghetto. On February 28, about 100 prisoners of Pawiak were executed. On March 4, another 84–100 prisoners (including 4 Jewish women) were killed in the ruins. Their bodies were thrown into the cellars of a demolished house at Nowolipie Street (corner of Karmelicka Street) and set on fire. Some of the severely wounded convicts were burnt alive. Six days later, 40 Jews captured in a hiding place at Grójecka Street and a few Poles who gave them shelter (Mieczysław Wolski and Władysław Marczak with their families) were shot in the ghetto. One of the murdered Jews was the famous Jewish historian Emanuel Ringelblum. On March 21, another 200 people were murdered in the ghetto, mainly inhabitants of Villages near Warsaw. Until the late evening hours, the glow over the crematorium of KL Warschau was visible in the city and the smell of burning bodies was evident.

Mass executions in the ghetto ruins also took place on March 16 (ca. 185 victims), March 29 (ca. 100–150 victims), March 30 (ca. 95 victims), March 31 (ca. 140 victims, of which ca. 100–150 were brought from Łowicz), April 6–7 (approx. 100), April 13 (approx. 115), April 14 (approx. 154–163), April 15 (approx. 100), April 17 (about 140 victims), April 26 (about 110), 11 May (about 120–130 victims, including a Russian woman and some Jews), 19 May (about 103 victims), 20 May (about 160–200), 22 May (about 200), 27 May (about 100), June 5/6 (about 110), June 9/10 (about 100). In addition, there were several executions of small groups of prisoners (often of Jewish origin), the number of whom is difficult to determine. After the unsuccessful rebellion of the prisoners of Pawiak's third unit (a night from July 19 to 20, 1944), 154 (according to other sources – 173) unfortunate escapees were shot in the ruins of the ghetto.

As the eastern front was approaching, the Germans started to dismantle Pawiak at the end of July 1944. The great evacuation transport, which included over 1800 prisoners, left Warsaw on July 30. Before that, activities aimed at erasing the evidence of crimes committed in Warsaw had also been intensified (e.g. on June 8 the ruins of a house on Nowolipki Street, where executions were regularly carried out were blown up). On August 13, 1944, almost two weeks after the outbreak of the Warsaw Uprising, the last execution took place in the ruins of the ghetto. At that time the Germans shot about 100 people – prisoners of Pawiak, who could not be evacuated from Warsaw before the outbreak of the uprising. There were 18 women among the victims, including two midwives with newborns.

== Number of victims ==
It is impossible to determine the exact number of victims of executions carried out in the ruins of the Warsaw Ghetto. Historian Krzysztof Dunin-Wąsowicz calculated that between January 1, 1943 and July 31, 1944, in secret or open executions carried out in Warsaw, the German occupiers murdered about 20,500 people, most of whom were in all probability executed in the former ghetto. According to IPN historians, around 20,000 people were murdered in the ruins of the ghetto between 1943 and 1944, including around 10,000 Poles. It is difficult to determine, however, how many of the murdered were prisoners of KL Warschau (mostly Jews from various European countries) and how many were the residents of Warsaw or the surrounding towns shot in retaliation executions. Hence, the probable number of victims of murders carried out in the ruins of the Warsaw Ghetto amounts to several thousand. According to Władysław Bartoszewski's calculations – based mainly on estimates of underground reports of the Pawiak cells and covering only those executions in which it was possible to determine at least the approximate number of victims – about 9600 people were murdered in the ruins of the ghetto between May 7, 1943 and August 13, 1944.

The following people were murdered in the ruins of the ghetto: Mikołaj Arciszewski (a journalist, cartoonist, head of one of the Soviet intelligence networks in Warsaw), Mieczysław Bilek (president of the underground Democratic Party, former President of Gdynia), Sławomir Bittner (company commander in the Home Army Battalion "Zośka"), Stanisław Chudoba (leader of the Polish Socialist Workers' Party), Tytus Czaki (one of the organizers of the Riflemen's Association, pre-war President of Brest and Włocławek), Hanna Czaki (daughter of Tytus, scout, liaison officer and secretary of the Information Department in the Information and Propaganda Bureau of the Home Army), Paweł Finder and Małgorzata Fornalska (leaders of the Polish Workers' Party), Tadeusz Hollender (poet, satirist, publicist), lieutenant Jan Hörl alias Frog (Home Army soldier, Silent Unseen/Cichociemny), Gustaw Kaleński (historian, archivist, captain of the Polish Army in retirement), Stefan Kapuściński (Silesian trade union and political activist), Mieczysław Kotarbiński (painter, graphic designer), dr Józef Lewicki (pedagogue, upbringing historian, lecturer at the Free Polish University in Warsaw), prof. Tadeusz Pruszkowski (painter, art critic, pedagogue), Emanuel Ringelblum (famous historian of Jewish origin), Colonel Józef Rosiek (inspector of the Warsaw Home Army), Stefan Sacha (president of the Main Board of the underground National Party), Wanda Józefa Maria Kirchmayer, second lieutenant of the Secret Military Organization.

== Perpetrators ==
Responsibility for the management of thousands of murders committed in the ruins of the Warsaw Ghetto falls primarily on the SS and Police Leaders in the Warsaw district, who held their positions from May 1943 to August 1944. That includes: SS-Brigadeführer Jürgen Stroop (sentenced to death by a Polish court after the war and executed on March 6, 1952), SS-Brigadeführer Franz Kutschera (killed by the soldiers of Kedyw AK on February 1, 1944), SS-Oberführer Herbert Böttcher (sentenced to death by a Polish court after the war and executed on June 12, 1950) and SS-Oberführer Paul Otto Geibel (sentenced to life imprisonment by a Polish court after the war, committed suicide in the Mokotów prison in 1966). Dr Ludwig Hahn, the commander of the German security police and service in Warsaw, played a special role in the extermination operation. Hahn – the originator of the idea of adapting the ruins of the ghetto to the extermination of the Warsaw population and the spiritus movens of all terrorist and extermination activities carried out against the Polish and Jewish population of Warsaw in 1941–1944 – lived in Hamburg under his real name for many years after the war. He was not brought to court until 1972 and was sentenced to 12 years' imprisonment after a one-year trial. The Hamburg sworn court changed the sentence to life imprisonment during the revision process. Hahn was released in 1983, however, and died three years later.

Executions in the ruins of the ghetto were carried out by:

- Officers of the Warsaw SD facility and the security police, under the supervision of Dr. Hahn, whose seat was located in Szuch Avenue;
- Pawiak staff members;
- KL Warschau staff members;
- SS-men from the Third Battalion of the 23rd SS Regiment and the Police (Battalion III/SS-Polizei Regiment 23), commanded by Major Otton Bundtke. (Note: Bundtke's Battalion stayed in the former ghetto and worked on its pacification after the official suppression of the uprising.)

Both open and secret executions carried out in Warsaw were repeatedly led by SS-Obersturmführer Norbert Bergh-Trips, SS-Haupturmführer Paul Werner and SS-Obersturmführer Walter Witossek. The latter often presided over the police "trio" signing mass death sentences for Polish political prisoners, which were later pronounced by the ad hoc court of the security police

== Bibliography ==
- Lesław M. Bartelski: Mokotów 1944. Warszawa: wydawnictwo MON, 1971.
- Władysław Bartoszewski: Warszawski pierścień śmierci 1939–1944. Warszawa: Interpress, 1970.
- Regina Domańska: Pawiak – więzienie Gestapo. Kronika lat 1939–1944. Warszawa: Książka i Wiedza, 1978.
- Bogusław Kopka: Konzentrationslager Warschau. Historia i następstwa. Warszawa: Instytut Pamięci Narodowej, 2007. ISBN 978-83-60464-46-5.
- Kazimierz Moczarski: Rozmowy z katem. Warszawa: Państwowy Instytut Wydawniczy, 1978.
- Maria Wardzyńska: Był rok 1939. Operacja niemieckiej policji bezpieczeństwa w Polsce. Intelligenzaktion. Warszawa: Instytut Pamięci Narodowej, 2009. ISBN 978-83-7629-063-8.
