= Forest Protection Command =

The Forest Protection Command (German: Forstschutzkommando), later the Forest Protection Corps (German: Forstschutzkorps), was an armed and uniformed paramilitary force created by the General Government which was responsible for defending forests in Poland from sabotage and for patrolling forests to prevent their use by the Polish resistance. It was formed in 1939 and largely composed of ethnic German residents of Poland.

== War crimes ==
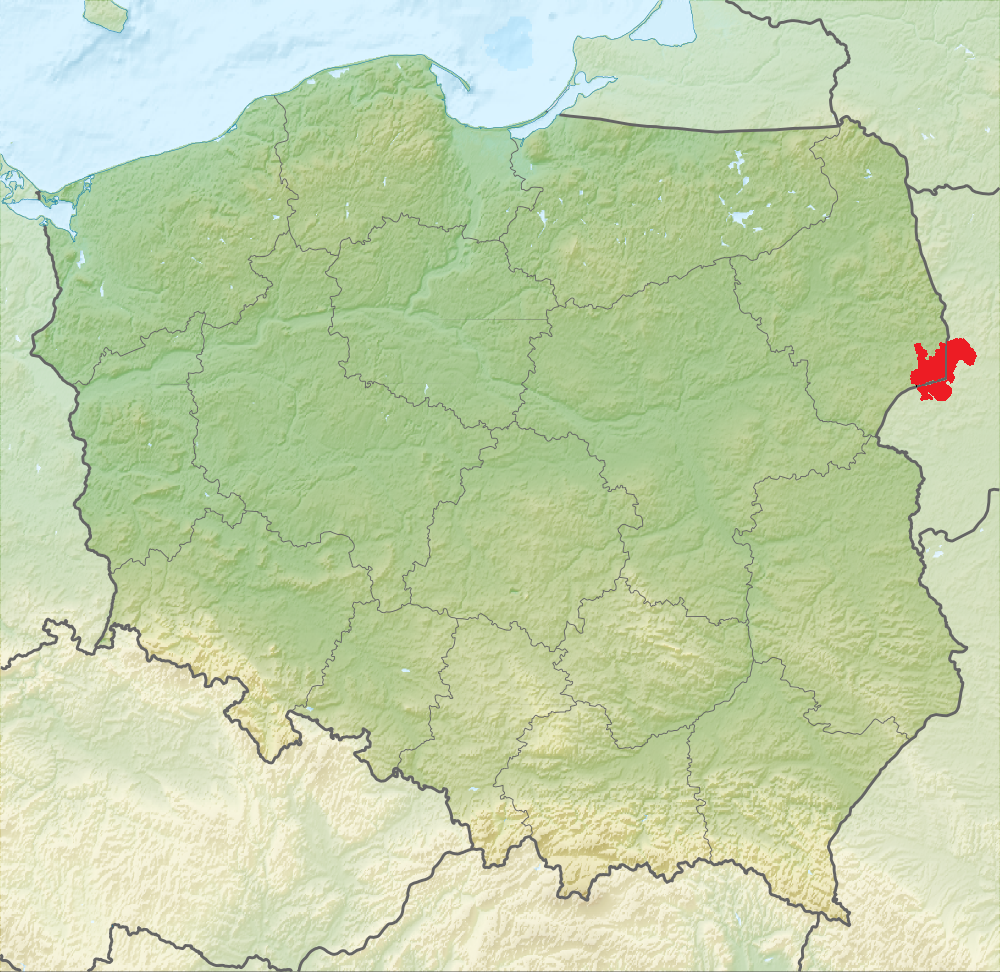
Location of the Białowieża Forest in red.

In July 1941, the FSK took control of the Białowieża Forest. The civilian population was evacuated, farms and villages burned to the ground, and two small Jewish communities were annihilated. Together with Police Battalion 322 the Forstschutzkommando-Abteilung Bialowies entered the villages in the forest, forced the inhabitants to leave within 30 minutes and burned down the houses and other buildings. Seven thousand people were deported and 34 villages destroyed. Jewish women and children were taken to the ghetto of Kobryn while 584 men and boys were killed outright.

== Rank insignia ==
Equivalent Rank	Rank in FSK	Rank insignia
Grenadier	Forstschütze; Forest Protector	
Gefreiter	Rottenführer; Section leader	
Obergefreiter	Oberrottenführer; Senior section leader	
Unteroffizier	Scharführer; Squad leader	
Unterfeldwebel	Oberscharführer; Senior squad leader	
Feldwebel	Truppführer; Troop leader	
Oberfeldwebel	Obertruppführer; Senior troop leader	
Senior ranks	Ranks and insignia of the Forest Service	

== See also ==
- Blue Police
