= Wanda Kirchmayer =

Polish engineer, resistance fighter

Wanda Józefa Maria Kirchmayer
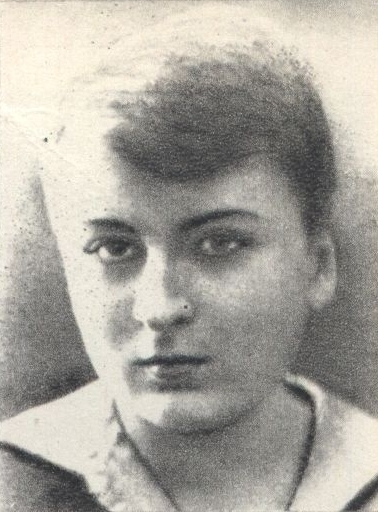
- Born: 9 November 1901; Majdan Górny, Poland
- Died: 29 March 1944 (aged 42); Warsaw ghetto, Poland
- Education: Warsaw University of Life Sciences
- Occupations: Engineer, resistance fighter
- Years active: 1940-1944
- Known for: Resistance work

Wanda Józefa Maria Kirchmayer (9 November 1901 – 29 March 1944) was an agricultural engineer and a World War II resistance fighter, and second lieutenant of the Polish Secret Military Organization.

== Biography ==
Wanda Józefa Maria Kirchmayer was the daughter of Kazimierz Kirchmayer (a lawyer) and Wanda (née Matłaszczyńska) and sister of Jerzy Kirchmayer, a general of the Polish Army. In 1921 she passed her matriculation exam at the IV State Gymnasium in Krakow. After high school, she volunteered with the White Cross for three months before starting university. Her studies were interrupted twice for illness but she received good grades and in 1928, she graduated from the Warsaw Agricultural University and received the title of agricultural engineer.

During World War II, beginning in the spring of 1940, she joined the resistance group called Secret Military Organization (TOW) under the pseudonyms "Wanda" and "Janka." She served as deputy to Jozef Kesiel (alias "Skib"), head of the Communications Department of the TOW Headquarters. Her tasks included maintaining contact with the TOW Kraków District and receiving couriers arriving in Warsaw. She had contacts with the cities of Lublin and Radom.

In March 1943, after the TOW was merged with the Home Army, she worked at the headquarters of the Warsaw District Kedyw. She was arrested while carrying incriminating material during a street contact with a courier arriving from Krakow in February/March 1943 and was imprisoned in Pawiak. She was tortured in the Gestapo's Szucha prison and she asked her relatives (who were still at large) for poison, but they did not succeed in delivering it. Wanda was executed in the ruins of the Warsaw ghetto.

== Orders and decorations ==
- Cross of Valour
- Silver Cross of the Military Order of Virtuti Militari – posthumously
