= Polish Criminal Police =

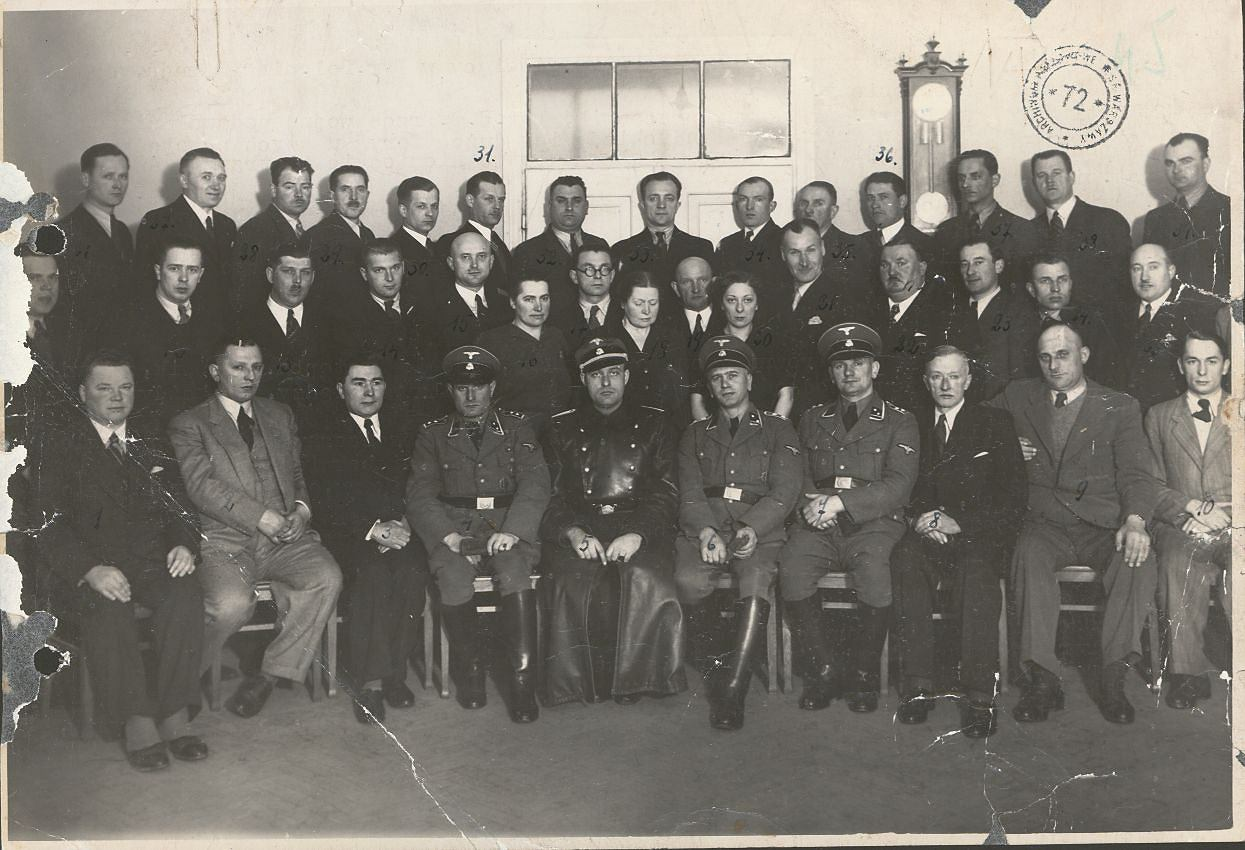
Polish Criminal Police

The Polish Criminal Police (Polish: Polska Policja Kryminalna) was a non-uniformed, armed and secret formation of auxiliary police, colloquially called “Polish Kripo”, active in the years 1940–1945 in the General Government during the German occupation of Poland.

In 1940, the investigative branch was excluded from the Blue Police and converted into the Polish Criminal Police (Polnische Kriminalpolizei) connected and directly supervised by the German criminal police Kripo. The commander of German Sipo and SD in the General Government, Eberhard Schöngarth, issued a decree ordering all pre-war Polish criminal police officers to report for duty or face execution. The Polish criminal police team was trained at the Security Police School (Sicherheitspolizei) and the Security Service of the Reichsführer SS (SD) in Rabka-Zdrój. It's estimated that there were between 1,790 and 2,800 ethnic Poles in the Polish Kripo units. The organization of the Polish Criminal Police was analogous to the organization of the German “Kriminalpolizei" and consisted of various police stations. Station 1 dealt with robberies, assaults, murders and sabotage; station 2 - with small thefts; station 3 - with burglary and house thieves; station 4 - moral crimes; station 5 - with internal service, search of Jews in hiding and other wanted persons; station 6 - with registration of wanted persons, station 7 - with forensic technique, and photographic laboratory.

== See also ==
- Blue Police
