= Blue Police =

Civilian law enforcement agency of Nazi-occupied Poland

The Blue Police
- Polnische Polizei im Generalgouvernement
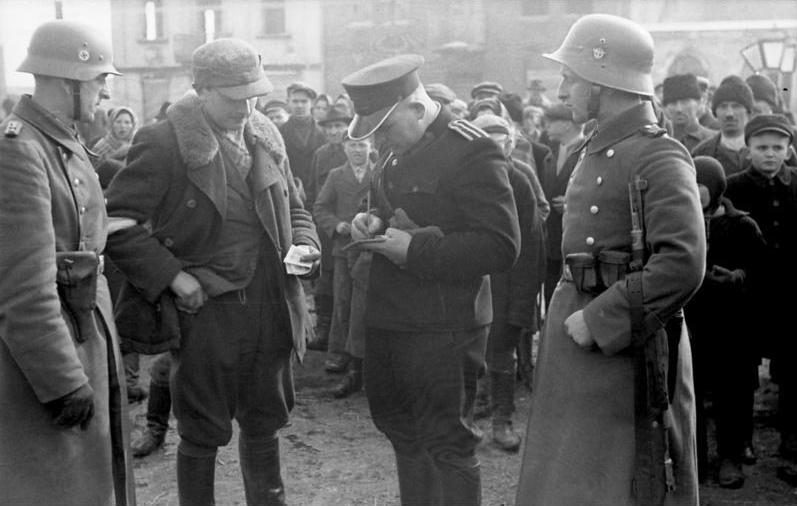
- Police street check in Kraków overseen by German Order Police
- Active: 17 December 1939 – 27 August 1944
- Country: Nazi Germany (General Government)
- Agency: Ordnungspolizei
- Type: Auxiliary police

Commanders
- Notable commanders: Friedrich-Wilhelm Krüger, HSSPF in General Government; Herbert Becker, BdO in General Government; Hans Köchlner, inspector (until 1942); Roman Sztaba, liaison officer

The Blue Police (Polish: Granatowa policja, lit. Navy-blue police), was the police during the Second World War in the General Government area of German-occupied Poland. Its official German name was Polnische Polizei im Generalgouvernement (Polish Police in the General Government; Polish: Policja Polska Generalnego Gubernatorstwa).

The Blue Police officially came into being on 30 October 1939 when Germany drafted Poland's prewar, State Police officers, organizing local units with German leadership. It was an auxiliary institution tasked with protecting public safety and order in the General Government. The Blue Police, initially employed purely to deal with ordinary criminality, was later also used to counter smuggling, which was an essential element of German-occupied Poland's underground economy.

The organization was officially dissolved and declared disbanded by the Polish Committee of National Liberation on 15 August 1944. After a review process, a number of its former members joined the new national policing structure, the Milicja Obywatelska (Citizens' Militia). Others were prosecuted after 1949 under Stalinism.

== Organization ==
Along with the German army, a large number of police entered Poland in September 1939: 21 battalions of German police, 8,000 policemen conscripted directly into the army to strengthen the military police, as well as Einsatzgruppen. On 4 October, Criminal Police (German: Kriminalpolizei; Kripo) forces from Berlin arrived in Warsaw with the task of taking control of the Polish police. In early November 1939, the Einsatzgruppen operating in Poland were transformed into the Security Police Command (German: Kommandeur der Sicherheitspolizei und des SD; KdS) and the Order Police Command (German: Kommandeur der Ordnungspolizei; KdO). After the establishment of the General Government, less than 5,000 Order Police (German: Ordnungspolizei; Orpo) were deployed on its territory. The Orpo was divided into the Protection Police (German: Schutzpolizei; Schupo) which stationed in cities, and the Gendarmerie (formed in summer 1940) stationing in villages and towns with a population of less than 5,000. In May 1940, the Special Service (German: Sonderdienst), a 2,500-member paramilitary organization made up of Volksdeutsche, many of whom spoke Polish, was established.

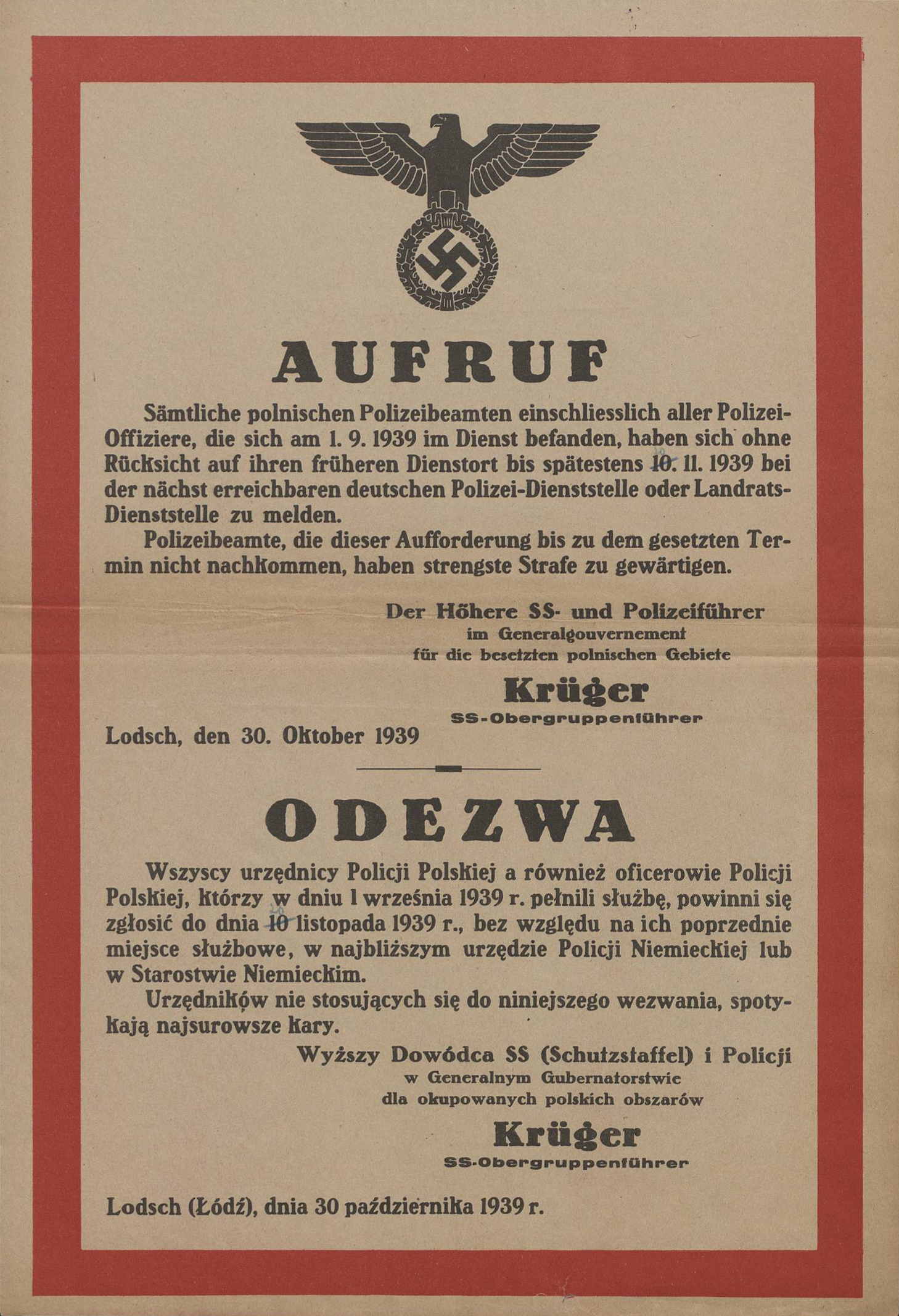
A German call poster requiring former Polish Police officers to report for duty to the occupant or face severe penalties.

On 30 October 1939, Higher SS and Police Leader in General Government Friedrich-Wilhelm Krüger ordered the mobilization of the pre-war Polish police into the service of the German authorities. The policemen were to report for duty or face severe punishment. The main reason for the restoration of the Polish police was the inability to maintain order under wartime conditions, the lack of knowledge of the Polish language by German policemen, as well as the undecided fate of the occupied Polish lands, the formation of the so-called residual state, Reststaat, was still under consideration.

The police was finally formed on 17 December 1939, by order of Governor General Hans Frank. In January 1940, the manpower of the Blue Police amounted to more than 10,000 men, including 1173 criminal policemen. After verification and the removal of most senior officers, the newly created police force was subordinated to the KdO. The Polish Criminal Police (German: Polnische Kriminalpolizei) became a separate service, excluded from the Blue Police and subordinated to the German Kripo, and thus part of the Security Police. The Blue Police did not have a separate commander this role was de facto performed by its organizer Major Hans Köchlner, who was a supervisory officer over Polish Police in the staff of the Commander of the Order Police. Köchlner had a reputation as an expert on the Polish police, as he had served an internship with them in 1937. He was assisted by a liaison officer, Lt. Col. Roman Sztaba, who before the war was the police commandant of the Wołyń voivodeship.

Blue Police was a communal institution, maintained by the local government. The highest level of command within its ranks was that of district or city commandant. The Blue Police was essentially the executive body of the local Gendarmerie and Schupo. The role of the district commandant was diminishing, and by the end of the occupation he had effectively become a figurehead. In the districts, individual stations were directly under the supervision of the local Gendarmerie. In urban areas, the role of commandants was somewhat greater, although they were also under the strict control of the local Schupo. In practice, this meant that an order to a blue policeman could be given by any uniformed German functionary.

Policemen wore the same uniforms, but without national insignia. After the German attack on the USSR the District of Galicia was incorporated into General Government, but the Blue Police was not established there, it was under the jurisdiction of the Ukrainian police. During the first year of occupation, about a thousand police stations were restored in the General Government. Their staffing reached the pre-war state. This was due to the fact that in the remaining areas of occupied Poland the Polish police was liquidated, and policemen were encouraged or forced to move to the General Government.

== Size and working conditions ==
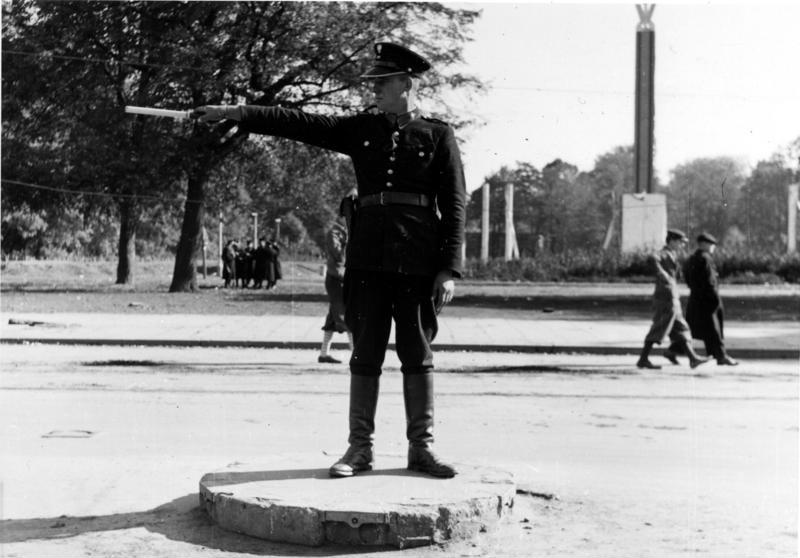
Blue Policeman directing traffic in Warsaw

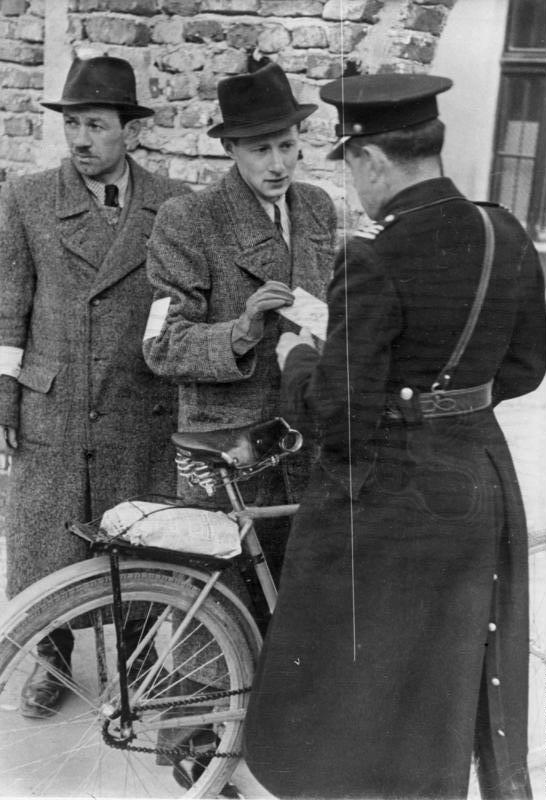
Blue Police check identity cards at the Kraków Ghetto gate

According to historian Andrzej Paczkowski (Spring Will Be Ours), the police force consisted of approximately 11,000–12,000 officers, but the actual number of its cadre was much lower initially. Emmanuel Ringelblum put the number as high as 14,300 by the end of 1942 including Warsaw, Lublin, Kielce and Eastern Galicia. The Encyclopedia of the Holocaust reports its manpower as 8,700 in February 1940 and states that it reached its peak in 1943 with 16,000 members. The statistics are explained by historian Marek Getter. The initial expansion of the force was the result of expulsion to Generalgouvernement of all Polish professional policemen, from the territories annexed by the Third Reich (Reichsgau Wartheland, Westpreußen, etc.). Another reason was a salary (250–350 zł) impossible to obtain elsewhere, augmented by bonuses (up to 500 zł each). Also, the Germans had intentionally eroded moral standards of the force by giving policemen the right to keep for themselves 10% of all confiscated goods. The Blue Police consisted primarily of Poles and Polish speaking Ukrainians from the eastern parts of the General Government.

== Duties of Blue Police ==
The Blue Police had little autonomy, and all of its high-ranking officers came from the ranks of the German police (Kriminalpolizei). It served in the capacity of an auxiliary force, along with the police forces guarding seats of administration (Schutzpolizei), Railway Police (Bahnschutzpolizei), Forest Protection Command (Forstschutzkommando) and Border Guard (Grenzschutz). The Blue Police was subordinate to the German Order Police with Polish prewar regulations. New volunteers (Anwärter) were trained at a police school in Nowy Sącz, with 3,000 graduates (receiving salary of 180 zł each), under the Schutzpolizei Major Vincenz Edler von Strohe (real name Wincenty Słoma, a Reichdeutscher formerly in the Austrian police).^{[p. 7]} There were additional though separate courses for Polish and Ukrainian enlisted ranks.

From the German perspective, the primary role of the Blue Police was to maintain law and order on the territories of occupied Poland, as to free the German Order Police for other duties. As Heinrich Himmler stated in his order from 5 May 1940: "providing general police service in the General Government is the role of the Polish police. German police will intervene only if it is required by the German interests and will monitor the Polish police."

As the force was primarily a continuation of the prewar Polish police force, it also relied largely on prewar Polish criminal laws, a situation that was accepted as a provisional necessity by the Germans.

== Historical assessment ==
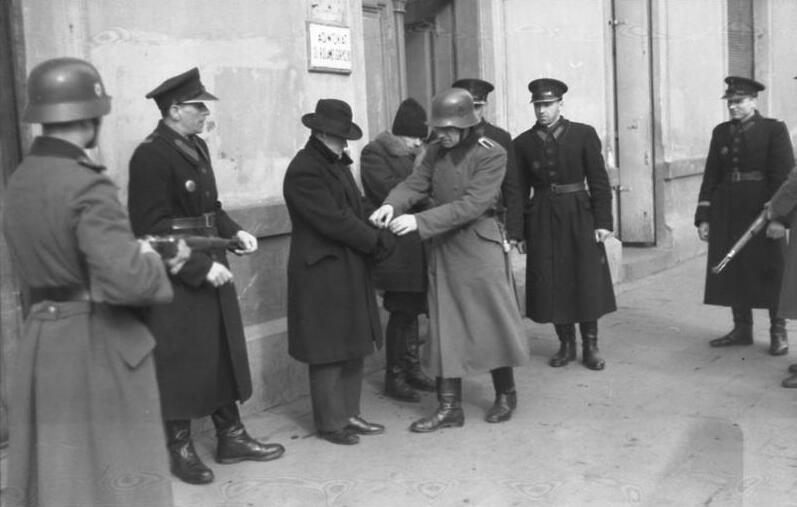
German and Polish police arresting a civilian.

The role of the Blue Police in its collaboration and resistance towards the Germans is difficult to assess as a whole and is often a matter of dispute. Historian Adam Hempel estimated based on data from resistance that circa 10% members of Blue Police and Criminal Police can be classified as collaborators.

Scholars disagree about the degree of involvement of the Blue Police in the rounding up of Jews. Although policing inside the Warsaw Ghetto was a responsibility of the Jewish Ghetto Police, a Polish-Jewish historian Emmanuel Ringelblum, chronicler of the Warsaw Ghetto, mentioned Polish policemen carrying out extortions and beatings. The police also took part in street roundups. On 3 June 1942, members of the Blue Police refused to execute 110 Jews in Gęsiówka prison in Warsaw, but they were forced to watch, some of them wept, while the Germans themselves executed the victims. According to Szymon Datner, "The Polish police were employed in a very marginal way, in what I would call keeping order. I must state with all decisiveness that more than 90% of that terrifying, murderous work was carried out by the Germans, with no Polish participation whatsoever." According to Raul Hilberg, "Of all the native police forces in occupied Eastern Europe, those of Poland were least involved in anti-Jewish actions.... They [the Polish Blue Police] could not join the Germans in major operations against Jews or Polish resistors, lest they be considered traitors by virtually every Polish onlooker. Their task in the destruction of the Jews was therefore limited."

Jan Grabowski, a Polish-born Jewish writer, has claimed that Blue Police played an important role in the Holocaust in Poland, often operating independently of German orders and killing Jews for financial gain. Citing the book: He states, "For a Jew, falling into the hands of the Polish police meant, in practically all known cases, certain death... The historical evidence—hard, irrefutable evidence coming from the Polish, German, and Israeli archives—points to a pattern of murderous involvement throughout occupied Poland."

According to Emanuel Ringelblum, who compared the role of the Polish police to the Jewish Ghetto Police (Jüdischer Ordnungsdienst, Jewish Order Service), "The uniformed police has had a deplorable role in the "resettlement actions". The blood of hundreds of thousands of Polish Jews, caught and driven to the "death vans" will be on their heads. The Germans' tactics were usually as follows: in the first "resettlement action" they utilized the Jewish Order Service, which behaved no better from the ethical point of view than their Polish opposite numbers. In the subsequent "actions," when the Jewish Order Service was liquidated as well, the Polish Police force was utilized."

A substantial part of the police belonged to the Polish underground resistance Home Army, mostly its counterintelligence and National Security Corps. Some estimates are as high of 50%. Some policemen refused German orders, "shouting in the streets and breaking[?] doors to give people time to escape or hide". Officers who disobeyed German orders did so at the risk of death. A few Blue Police members who acted against orders were eventually recognized as Righteous among the Nations.

Additionally, forcible draft among members of the Polish police was conducted to create the Polnisches Schutzmannschaftsbataillon 202 sent to the East, with 360 men most of whom deserted to the 27th Home Army Infantry Division in defence of ethnic Polish population against the UPA massacres.

== Notable members ==
Warsaw was the biggest city in the Generalgouvernement, so the position of commander of the Warsaw police was the most important post available to an ethnic Pole in German-occupied Poland. Its first chief, Marian Kozielewski (Jan Karski's brother), was imprisoned by the Germans and sent to Auschwitz concentration camp. Its next chief, Aleksander Reszczyński, was murdered in 1943 by the communist Gwardia Ludowa; 1977 research in the Polish Government-in-Exile archives revealed that Reszczyński was a member of the underground who gave the Polish Home Army invaluable intelligence. After the Revolutions of 1989 many Blue Police officers were rehabilitated, and earlier communist-propagated stereotypes were revised.

== Ranks ==
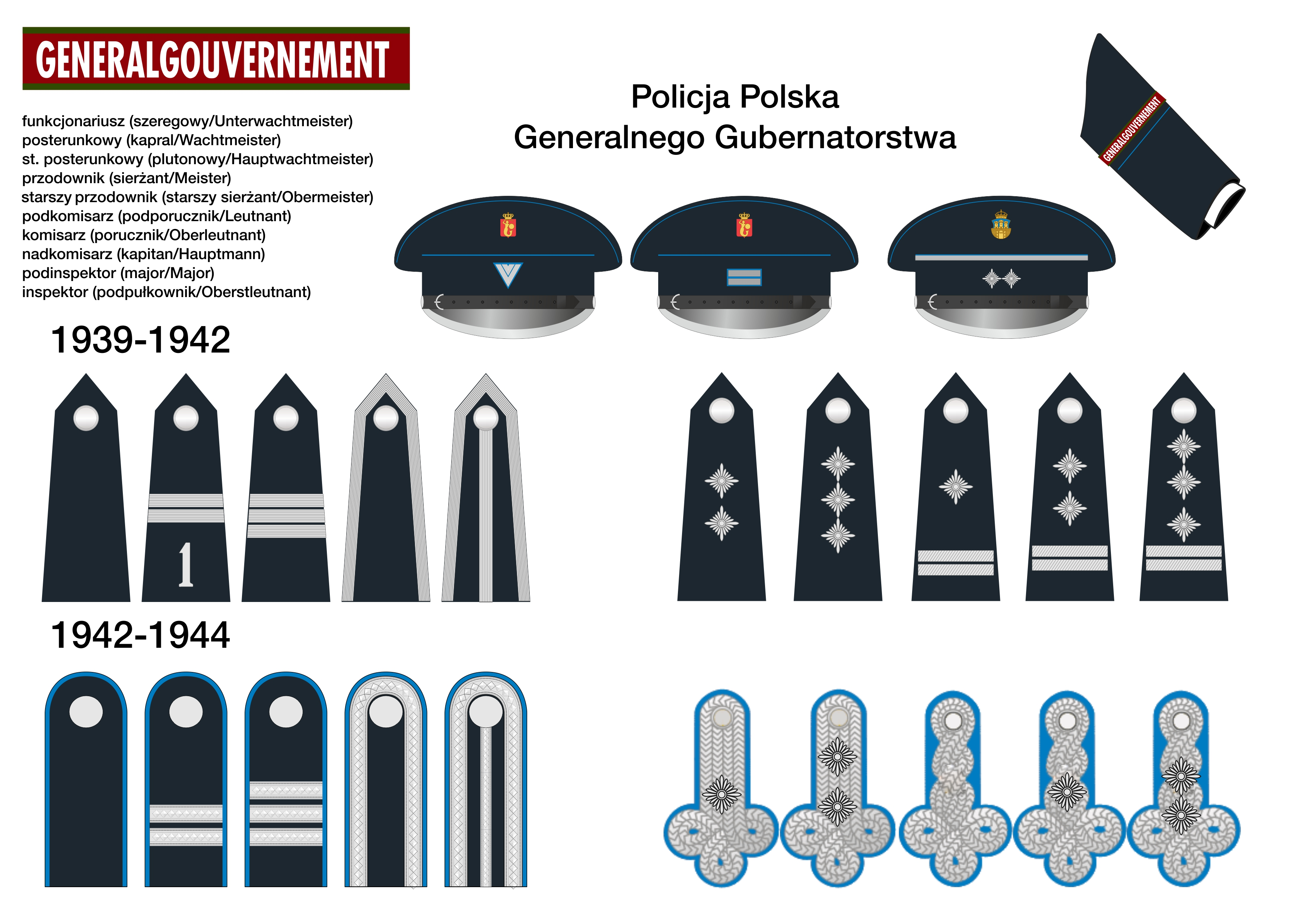
Rank insignia of the Blue Police.

The ranks of the Blue Police were as following:

Cap insignia	Shoulder insignia	Rank	German equivalent
		Inspektor	Oberstleutnant
		Podinspektor	Major
		Nadkomisarz	Hauptmann
		Komisarz	Oberleutnant
		Podkomisarz	Leutnant
		St. przodownik	Obermeister
		Przodownik	Meister
		St. posterunkowy	Hauptwachtmeister
		Posterunkowy	Wachtmeister
		Funkcjonariusz	Unterwachtmeister

== See also ==
- Schutzmannschaft Battalion 202
- Ukrainian Auxiliary Police
- Workers' Militia PPS-WRN
- Jewish Ghetto Police
- Polish Criminal Police

== Bibliography ==
- Frydel, Tomasz (2019). "Ordinary Men?: The Polish Police and the Holocaust in the Subcarpathian Region" (PDF). In Black, Peter; Rásky, Béla; Windsperger, Marianne (eds.). Collaboration in Eastern Europe during the Second World War and the Holocaust. new academic press / Vienna Wiesenthal Institute for Holocaust Studies. pp. 69–126. ISBN 978-3-7003-2073-9.
- Grabowski, Jan; Libionka, Dariusz (2014). "Meldunki Obwodu "Praga" Policji Polskiej o zatrzymaniach Żydów w Warszawie w okresie maj–lipiec 1943 r." Zagłada Żydów. Studia i Materiały (in Polish) (10): 592–621. ISSN 1895-247X.
- Grabowski, Jan (2020). Na posterunku. Udział polskiej policji granatowej i kryminalnej w zagładzie Żydów [On Duty: Participation of Blue and Criminal Police in the Destruction of the Jews]. Wołowiec: Wydawnictwo Czarne. ISBN 9788380499867.
- Grabowski, Jan (2024). On Duty: The Polish Blue and Criminal Police in the Holocaust. Yad Vashem Publications. ISBN 978-965-308-698-2.
- Hempel, Adam (1990). Pogrobowcy klęski. Rzecz o policji "granatowej" w Generalnym Gubernatorstwie 1939–1945. Warsaw: PWN. ISBN 9788301092917.
- Robert Litwiński. Komisja rehabilitacyjno-kwalifikacyjna dla byłych policjantów (1946-1952). "Dzieje Najnowsze", volume XXXVI, 2004. ISSN 0419-8824.
- Piotrowski, Tadeusz (1997). Poland's Holocaust: Ethnic Strife, Collaboration with Occupying Forces and Genocide... McFarland & Company. ISBN 0-7864-0371-3.
- Policja granatowa w Generalnym Gubernatorstwie w latach 1939–1945, edited by Tomasz Domański i Edyta Majcher-Ociesa, Kielce–Warszawa 2019, 2 ISBN 978-83-8098-838-5
- Szymanska-Smolkin, Sylwia (2017). Piotr Wróbel (ed.). Fateful Decisions: The Polish Policemen and the Jewish Population of Occupied Poland, 1939-1945 (PhD thesis). University of Toronto.
- Wiatr, Ewa (2014). ""Zdawanie Żydów" – udział policjantów granatowych w wysiedlaniu Żydów na przykładzie powiatu radomszczańskiego". Zagłada Żydów. Studia i Materiały (in Polish) (10): 495–512. doi:10.32927/ZZSiM.535. ISSN 1895-247X.
