= Emanuel Ringelblum =

Polish historian (1900–1944)

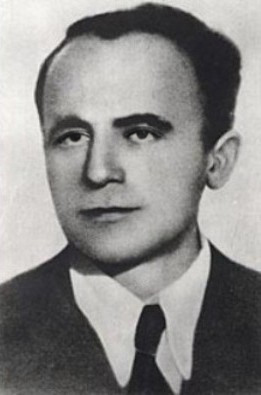
- Born: 21 November 1900; Buchach, Kingdom of Galicia and Lodomeria
- Died: 10 March 1944 (aged 43); Muranów, Warschau, General Government

Emanuel Ringelblum (21 November 21, 1900 – c. 10 March 1944) was a Polish-Jewish historian, politician and social worker, known for his Notes from the Warsaw Ghetto, Notes on the Refugees in Zbąszyn chronicling the deportation of Jews from the town of Zbąszyń, and the so-called Ringelblum Archive of the Warsaw Ghetto.

== Before the war ==
He was born in Buchach, an eastern Galician town, then in the Austro-Hungarian Empire, now in Ukraine. Due to the strong presence of Yiddish culture in his hometown, Ringelblum developed a strong devotion to the Yiddish language, as well as his political beliefs. In 1914, Ringelblum moved to Nowy Sącz and then proceeded to move to Warsaw in 1920. Ringelblum graduated from Warsaw University, where he completed his doctoral thesis in 1927 on the history of the Jews of Warsaw during the Middle Ages. Thereafter he taught history in Jewish schools and became a member of a political movement known as the “Left Po’alei Zion”. He was known as a historian and a specialist in the field of the history of Polish Jews from the late Middle Ages to the 18th century. Ringelblum worked for a variety of social organizations prior to the onset of World War II. Most notably, he helped Polish Jews expelled from Germany in 1938 and 1939.

== Pre-war activities ==
Prior to World War II, Ringelblum took part in many organizations that helped to shape his passion for Jewish history, as well as his activity during the war. Ringelblum was a member of Po'ale Tsiyon (Workers of Zion), which sparked his devotion to both the Yiddish language and the history of Judaism and its people. When the party split in 1920, he aligned with the left half of the organization (LPZ), in which he played a large role in cultural work. In 1923, Ringelblum became one of the founding fathers of the Young Historians Circle. With help from co-founder Raphael Mahler, Ringelblum was able to gather more than 40 Jewish history students, as well as a generation of Jewish historians that worked to serve their people. The group was widely recognized for its publication of two journals and its work to defend the right to live in Poland. He proceeded to join YIVO in 1925 as a result of his firm belief in "for the people by the people," and worked in the historical section of the organization. He worked as an editor for the group, and by 1939, Ringelblum had 126 scholarly articles published under his name. Ringelblum was also an active member of the Landkentenish movement, in which he stressed the need to preserve the Jewish link to Eastern Europe. In 1932, Ringelblum began working for the American Jewish Joint Distribution Committee (JDC), where he learned how self-help could provide both moral and economic assistance to Jews in Poland facing discrimination as a result of pogroms. Due to his success, the organization sent him to help Polish refugees in 1938. Following his work with JDC, Ringelblum served as the leader of Aleynhilf, which later became a key relief organization in the Warsaw Ghetto by working against the Warsaw Judenrat and the Jewish police. The group provided job opportunities for the Jewish elite, and this served as the basis for Oyneg Shabes. He also founded a Yiddish culture organization entitled Yidishe Kultur Organizatsiye.

== World War II ==
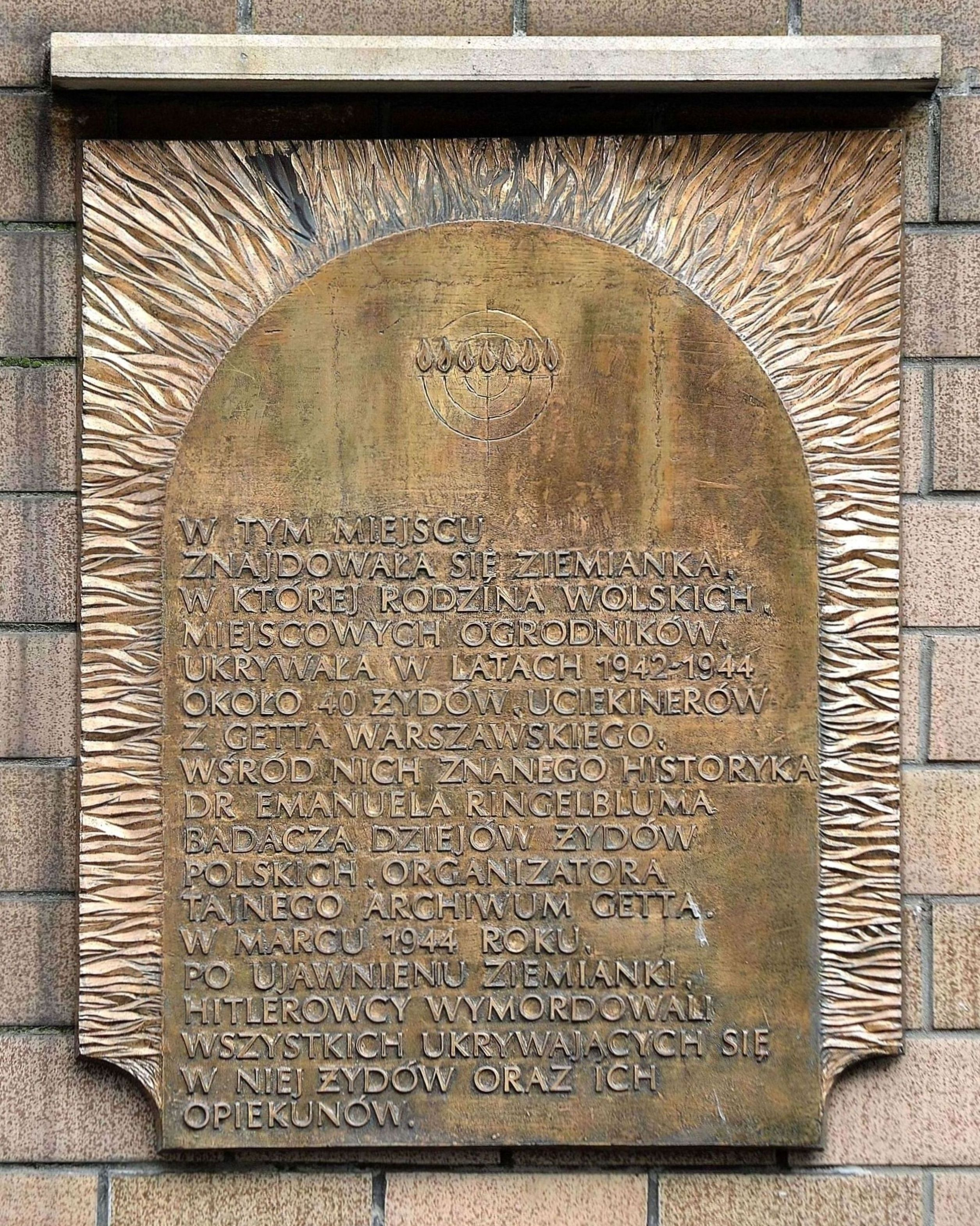
Plaque in memory of around 40 Jews − among them Emanuel Ringelblum − and the Wolski family, at 77 Grójecka Street in Warsaw

During the war, Ringelblum and his family were resettled to the Warsaw Ghetto. There he led a secret operation code-named Oyneg Shabbos (Yiddish for "Sabbath delight"). The activities of the group were kept so secretive that not even the inhabitants of the ghetto were aware of the operation. He spent his days collecting information, and wrote notes at night. Together with numerous other Jewish writers, scientists and ordinary people, Ringelblum collected diaries, documents, commissioned papers, and preserved the posters and decrees that comprised the memory of the doomed community. Among approximately 25,000 sheets preserved there are also detailed descriptions of destruction of ghettos in other parts of occupied Poland, the Treblinka extermination camp, Chełmno extermination camp and a number of reports made by scientists conducting research on the effects of famine in the ghettos. The operation used the Jewish Social Self-Help (ZSS), an organization tolerated by the Nazi Party, as a cover for its activities. The office of this social service is now the storage site of the archives.

He was also one of the most active members of Żydowska Samopomoc Społeczna (Polish for Jewish Social Aid), an organisation established to help the starving people of the Warsaw Ghetto. On the eve of the ghetto's destruction in the spring of 1943, when all seemed lost, the archive was placed in three milk cans and metal boxes. Parts were buried in the cellars of Warsaw buildings.

Shortly before the Warsaw Ghetto Uprising, Ringelblum and his family escaped from the Ghetto and found refuge on the Polish side of Warsaw. However, on 7 March 1944 their hiding place (prewar address 81 Grójecka Street) was discovered by the Gestapo after a Polish collaborator betrayed them. Soon after, Ringelblum and his family were executed, along with the Polish rescuers Mieczysław Wolski and Janusz Wysocki, in Pawiak Prison.

== Ringelblum archives ==
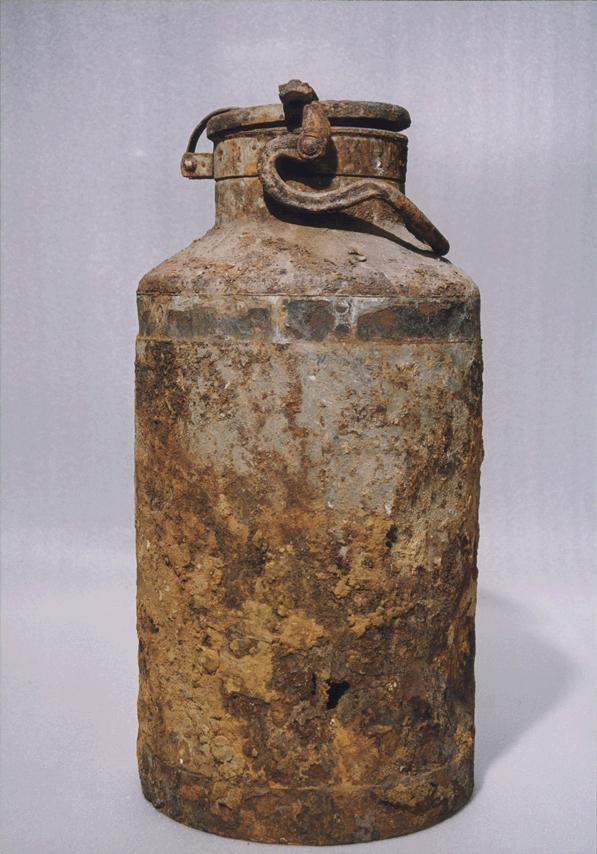
One of the milk cans used to hide documents. From the Ringelblum "Oyneg Shabbos" Archive

The fate of Ringelblum's archives is only partially known. In September 1946, ten clay-covered tin boxes were found in the ruins of Warsaw. Although they were damaged by water, the contents of the boxes were able to be salvaged by conservators. In December 1950, two additional milk cans were found in a cellar of a ruined house at 68 Nowolipki Street. The second archive was not only found in much better condition than the first, but also contained a larger variety of artifacts. Among them were copies of several underground newspapers, a narrative of deportations from the Warsaw Ghetto, and public notices by the Judenrat (the council of Jewish leaders), but also documents of ordinary life, concert invitations, milk coupons, and chocolate wrappers. The archival treasure provides insight on the daily lives, struggles, and sufferings of Polish Jews living in a pivotal area during the Holocaust.

Despite repeated searches, the rest of the archive, including the third milk can, has yet to be found. It is rumoured to be located beneath what is now the Chinese Embassy in Warsaw.

The Jewish Historical Institute in Warsaw is named for him.

== Published works ==
- Polish-Jewish Relations during the Second World War (1974)

== Bibliography ==
- "American Jewish Joint Distribution Committee." In Memoriam - Emanuel Ringelblum - JDC Archives.
- Mark Celinscak, A Procession of Shadows: Examining Warsaw Ghetto Testimony. New School Psychology Bulletin. Volume 6, Number 2 (2009): 38–50.
- Samuel D. Kassow, Who Will Write Our History? Emanuel Ringelblum, the Warsaw Ghetto, and the Oyneg Shabes Archive, Bloomington & Indianapolis 2007.
- Samuel D. Kassow, “Emanuel Ringelblum and Jewish Society”, Michael, Institute of Diaspora Studies, Tel Aviv University, 2004
- Sarah Traister Moskovitz, Poetry In Hell: The complete collection of poems from the Ringelblum Archives in the original Yiddish with English translations. Web. July 2010.
- Shapiro, Robert Moses, Tadeusz Epsztein, and Samuel D. Kassow. "The Warsaw Ghetto Oyneg Shabes–Ringelblum Archive." Indiana University Press.
