= Secret City (book) =

2002 book by Gunnar S. Paulsson

Secret City: The Hidden Jews of Warsaw 1940–1945
- Author: Gunnar S. Paulsson
- Language: English
- Subject: Holocaust in Poland
- Publisher: Yale University Press
- Publication date: 2002
- Publication place: United States
- Pages: 328
- ISBN: 9780300204773

Secret City: The Hidden Jews of Warsaw 1940–1945 is a 2002 book by Gunnar S. Paulsson. It was translated to Polish in 2008. Secret City is a social history of the Jews who escaped from the Warsaw Ghetto and tried to survive, living illegally "on the Aryan side". The book has received mostly favourable reviews, with several historians calling it "significant", "a milestone" and “riveting study".

== Contents ==
Paulsson used memoirs and statistics to analyze the circumstances and fate of the approximately 28,000 Jews who escaped the Warsaw Ghetto and found refuge on the outside. He estimates that out of the city's population of about one million, about 70,000 to 90,000 gentile Poles were involved in helping those Jewish escapees, while between 3,000 and 4,000 Polish criminals and profiteers, known as szmalcowniks, preyed on those Jews and their helpers, blackmailing them or betraying them to the German occupiers. Paulsson finds that about 11,500 or 40% of the Jewish escapees survived (in fact, 17,000 or about 60% were alive before the Warsaw Uprising of 1944 whose aftermath left the city in ruins), a number comparable to the Jewish survival rate in Western Europe. The Jews who survived where safeguard in the titular 'secret city', a loose network of Polish helpers, including the underground organization known as Żegota, or the Council to Aid Jews.

Paulsson argues that the Warsaw Ghetto Uprising of 1943, while heroic, failed to protect Jewish ghetto inhabitants, and speculates that if the Ghetto uprising did not occur, or was delayed, more Jews of Warsaw would have survived. He also discusses whether antisemitism in Poland might not have been too exaggerated, both in the past and present, and whether fears of antisemitism and resulting betrayal by Poles collaborating with the Nazis might have not negatively impacted the survival of the Jews of Warsaw, some of which might have chosen to stay in the doomed Ghetto. In his view, Jews' belief that escaping and seeking aids from the Poles was not likely to result in survival was incorrect and based on anti-Polish racism.

== Awards ==
In its original form as his doctoral thesis, it was awarded the Fraenkel Prize in Contemporary History (1998). The English edition was awarded the biennial Polish Studies Association Prize in 2004, and the Polish edition, Utajone Miasto: Żydzi po "aryjskiej" stronie Warszawy 1940–1945 (Znak, 2008) was awarded the inaugural Kazimierz Moczarski Historical Prize in 2009.

== Reception ==
According to Gabriel N. Finder's review in East European Politics and Societies, Paulsson's study covers a neglected dimension in Holocaust studies, the study of Jews in hiding, which has remained to date peripheral in Holocaust historiography. According to Finder, the book was bound to draw fire as estimates in the book exceed those in historical literature, Paulsson's positive views of the attitudes of Polish society towards Jews, and Paulsson's questioning of the wisdom of the Warsaw Ghetto Uprising. Finder sees Paulsson's book as diametrically opposed to Jan T. Gross's approach. Finder concludes by saying that there is much to commend in the book, as it covers a worthy topic, will stimulate scholars in the field to revisit the topic, and the narrative skillfully conveys he fortitude of thousands of Jews who survived – or perished – by hiding.

According to Samuel Kassow's 2005 review in The Journal of Modern History, the book was "a milestone in the study of Polish-Jewish relations", and both "controversial and seminal". According to Kassow, the book contradicts what most Jewish survivors and leaders have said and thought about the Holocaust. Kassow states, "One might disagree with Paulsson’s statistics, but so far no one has proposed anything better." While Kassow does question Paulsson's reliance on hindsight in his analysis of the decisions of Jewish leaders, he sees the book as a "masterful contribution to the history of the Holocaust".

Jack Fischel, writing in Shofar: An Interdisciplinary Journal of Jewish Studies, called the book a "riveting study", and wrote that Paulsson challenges a generalization of Polish antisemitism, which while certainly present, was not as widespread as many have thought, both back then and since.

Shimon Redlich writing in The American Historical Review wrote that "Paulsson's story of the hidden Jews of Warsaw is a most significant addition to the immense Holocaust literature [that may] Paulsson's prompt at least some Jews to reexamine their attitudes toward Poles."

Anita Shelton in History: Reviews of New Books concluded that "overall, Paulsson's Secret City impresses with its careful scholarship and restrained presentation of a controversial set of propositions".

Jeremy D. Popkin in Judaism praises the book for being original, a rare contribution in the field of Holocaust historical studies, although he notes that Paulsson might have underestimated the importance of familial and communal ties in his analysis of why Jews did not seek refuge on the Polish side.

John Radzilowski in an H-Net review, wrote that the book is well-written, important, path-breaking, and a welcome addition to the Holocaust literature, with its "basically solid research, its revision of received wisdom, and its condemnation of the spurious comparisons that are still too often made by some Holocaust scholars between supposedly "good" nations and "bad" ones", though he noted that the book has one major problem, which is Paulsson's willingness to engage in unnecessary polemics, in particular what he finds as unnecessary and unconvincing criticism of Jan T. Gross' book Neighbors.

Joanna Michlic, writing in Holocaust and Genocide Studies, was more critical, noting that while the book contains "skillful quantitative analysis and valuable observations about the phenomenon of survival itself", it "fails to address consistently certain major interpretive problems". She argues that he fails to address some issues, such as the experiences of Jews who survived without help of others by successfully "passing" for an ethnic Pole. She concludes that "for all its strengths Paulsson's work cannot be seen as the last word on this important and troubling subject"

Leo Cooper, writing in Slavic Review, wrote that Paulsson's book is filled with contradictions and faulty statistics. Following the review, Paulsson sued Leo Cooper and the Slavic Review for libel in Ontario. His action was dismissed following a jury trial in 2015 and an application to appeal was finally dismissed in 2018.

In 2014, Havi Dreifuss published a 30-page paper arguing that Paulsson uses sources selectively and that "Paulsson’s calculations, which he made on the basis of erroneous statistical and methodological assumptions, led him to questionable historical conclusions, which should be rejected".

Polish historian Andrzej Żbikowski states that Paulsson's figures for the rescue of Jews have been challenged by other historians as too high, because he assumes that the number of rescues was much higher than can be documented using historical sources.
