= Franceska Mann =

Polish dancer (1917–1943)

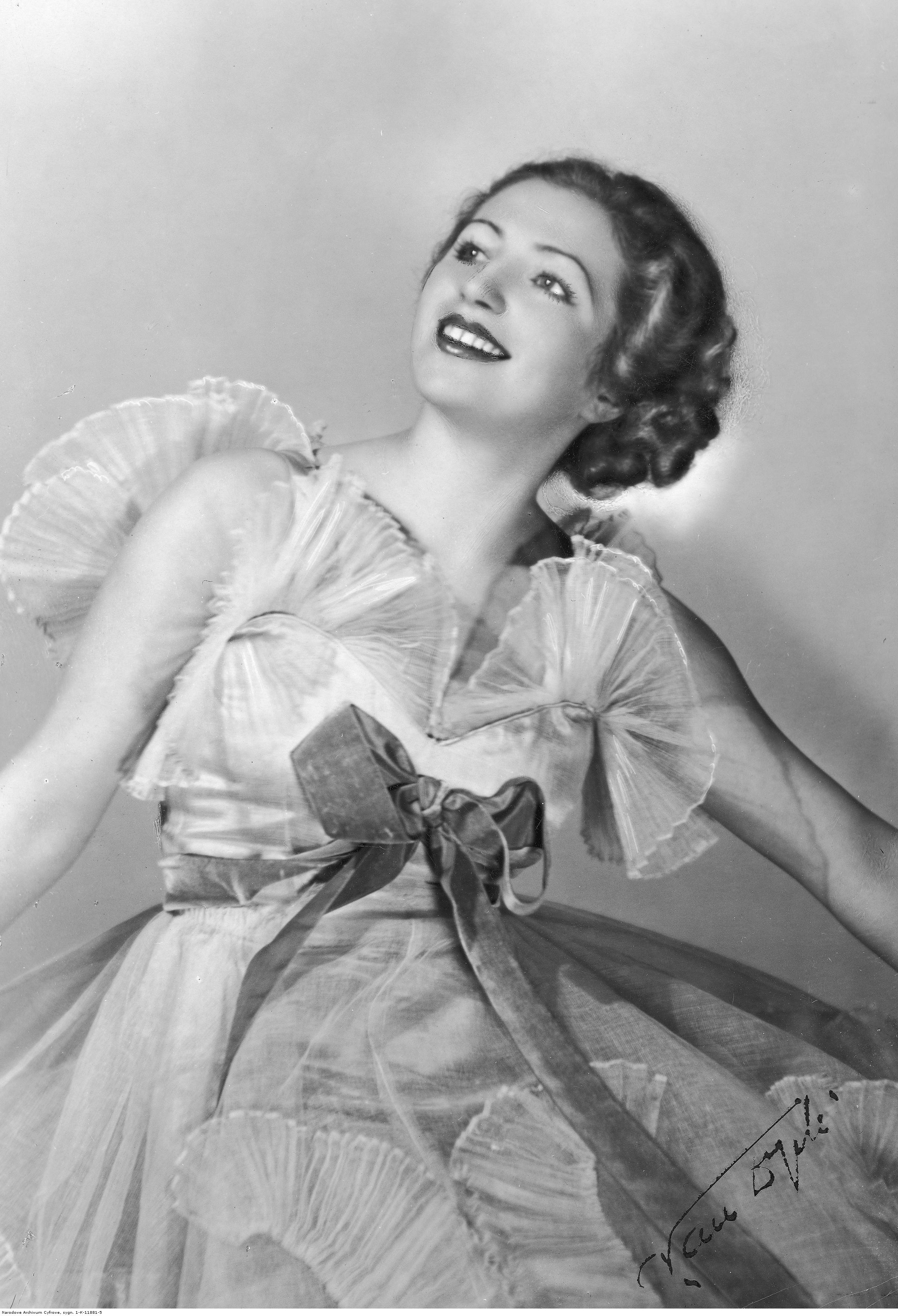
- Mann c. 1938
- Born: Franceska Manheimer; 4 February 1917; Warsaw, Kingdom of Poland
- Died: 23 October 1943 (aged 26); Auschwitz-Birkenau, German-occupied Poland
- Other names: Lola Horowitz surname also spelled as Man, Mannówna, or Rosenberg-Manheimer
- Occupations: Actress, dancer
- Spouse: Marek Rosenberg

Franceska Manheimer-Rosenberg (4 February 1917 – 23 October 1943), better known as Franceska Mann, was a Polish Jewish ballerina who, according to some accounts, killed a Nazi guard, Josef Schillinger, while a prisoner at the Auschwitz concentration camp and wounded at least one other, Wilhelm Emmerich. Her actions are said to have sparked an uprising among fellow female Jewish prisoners before she herself was killed.

In the most popular but unverified version of the event, Mann is said to have performed a striptease for Nazis at the camp and, once down to naught but high heels took one of her shoes and stabbed Walter Quakernack in the face with the heel, causing him to drop his firearm. She then used it to shoot Schillinger and Emmerich. Schillinger died from his wounds several hours later while Emmerich was left with a permanent limp.

== Life ==
Franceska Mann was a young dancer residing in Warsaw before the Second World War. She studied dance in the dance school of Irena Prusicka. Her friends at that time included Wiera Gran and Stefania Grodzieńska. In 1939 she was placed 4th during the international dance competition in Brussels among 125 other young ballet dancers. She was considered one of the most beautiful and promising dancers of her generation in Poland both in the classical and modern repertoire.

At the beginning of the Second World War she was a performer at the Melody Palace nightclub in Warsaw. She was a prisoner in the Warsaw Ghetto. In several publications she is mentioned as a German collaborator. Her name is associated with the "Hotel Polski affair".

Mann is mentioned in Filip Mueller's eyewitness account Eyewitness Auschwitz as well as in the account of Jerzey Tabau, a former Birkenau prisoner. Tabau's report was filed for the International Military Tribunal in Nuremberg as Document L-022.

On 23 October 1943, a transport of around 1,700 Polish Jews arrived on passenger trains at the death camp at Auschwitz-Birkenau, although they had been told that they were being taken to a transfer camp called Bergau near Dresden, from where they would continue on to Switzerland to be exchanged for German POWs. One of the passengers was Franceska Mann. She had probably obtained her foreign passport from the Hotel Polski on the Aryan side. In July 1943, the Germans arrested the 600 Jewish inhabitants of the hotel and some of them were sent to Bergen-Belsen as exchange Jews. Others were sent to Vittel in France to await transfer to South America.

According to some versions, the new arrivals were not registered but were told that they had to be disinfected before crossing the border into Switzerland. They were taken into the undressing room next to the gas chamber and ordered to undress. Other versions of the story mention the events that follow taking place at either the selection ramp or a labor area of the camp. Regardless of location, what is confirmed is that she fatally wounded the roll call officer Oberscharführer Josef Schillinger, using a pistol (many accounts say his own) and fired two shots, wounding him in the stomach. Then she fired a third shot which wounded another SS Sergeant named Emmerich.

According to Tabau, the shots served as a signal for the other women to attack the SS men; one SS man had his nose torn off, and another was scalped. However, accounts vary: in some Schillinger and Emmerich are the only casualties. Reinforcements were summoned and the camp commander, Rudolf Höss, came with other SS men carrying machine guns and grenades. According to Filip Mueller, all people not yet inside the gas chamber were mowed down by machine guns. Other mentioned outcomes are the Jewish women being herded into the gas chamber, taken outside and executed, or Franceska taking her own life with the stolen pistol. Due to various conflicting accounts, it is unclear what truly happened next; the only things that are certain are on that day Schillinger died, Emmerich was wounded, and all the Jewish women were killed.

According to Jan Grabowski, however, Mann was an infamous collaborator and szmalcownik, who turned in a Polish resistance member to the Germans and was shortly thereafter, in the autumn of 1942, executed by the Polish underground. The Auschwitz Museum confirms the account of a woman shooting the two SS guards on 23 October 1943. It's believed the woman was Franciszka Mann, but her identity is not 100% verified.

Mann is the subject of a 2024 documentary, titled Francesca, by Lena Chaplin.
