= Secret City =

Secret City may refer to:

- Secret City (book), a book by Gunnar S. Paulsson
- Secret City (TV series), a 2016 Australian television mini-series
- Secret City Records, a Canadian independent record label
- Long Tieng or Secret City, a Laotian military base
- Oak Ridge, Tennessee or the Secret City

== See also ==
- Closed city, a settlement with travel and residency restrictions in the Soviet Union
- Secret Cities, an American rock band
- The Secret City, a children's television program
- Secret City Saga, a collection of comic book titles
