= Kunicki =

Kunicki (feminine: Kunicka; plural: Kuniccy) is a Polish surname. Notable people with the surname include:

- Mikołaj Kunicki (1914–2001), Polish soldier
- Stanisław Kunicki (1861–1886), Polish revolutionary
- Stefan Kunicki (died 1684), Polish-Ukrainian Cossack
- Walter Kunicki (born 1958), American politician
