= Holocaust and Memory =

1996 book by Barbara Engelking

- First edition (Polish)
- Editor: Gunnar S. Paulsson
- Author: Barbara Engelking
- Language: Polish
- Subject: The Holocaust
- Genre: Memoir
- Publication date: 1996
- English publication date: 2001
- Media type: Print

Holocaust and Memory: The Experience of the Holocaust and its Consequences, an Investigation Based on Personal Narratives is a book written by Barbara Engelking and edited by Gunnar S. Paulsson, originally published in 1996 in Polish and translated into English in 2001. Engelking analyzes a series of Jewish survivors living in Poland to explore how their life under the Nazis impacted them. It was published in English by Leicester University Press.

== Reception ==
Aviel Roshwald reviewed the book in European History Quarterly. Reviews were also published in Holocaust and Genocide Studies, Shofar, and Ethnopolitics.
