= Schutzmannschaft Battalion 202 =

German police battalion

The Schutzmannschaft Battalion 202 was a collaborationist auxiliary police battalion in the General Government during World War II. It consisted of 360 to 580 Polish men where around 400 were volunteers and 180 forced conscripts under German leadership. The unit was created in Krakau on 27 March 1942, with silent recruitment beginning in May of that year. At first only two Polish men volunteered since the recruitment faced resistance and little to no publicity. Consequently, the Germans resorted to advertisement in the Goniec Krakowski newspaper, writing:

"Vacancies! Healthy men aged 20 to 30 may apply to the Polish Police at the following address: 8-10 Michałowskiego Street."

Upon changing the recruitment strategy and advertising in the press, there were immediate results. Around 400 Polish men volunteered for the unit after the notice was published. Most of these men were aged 18-24 years old, usually wanted by the Gestapo for crimes like robbery or usury. As reported by one of the battalion members there also were men that quit poorly paid jobs and were afraid of being sent to forced labor in Germany. The Germans filled the rest of the unit with conscripts from the polish Blue Police, also known as the Einheimische Polizei.

Initially stationed in Luzk in Volhynia, the battalion later operated around Kostopol. Training took place at the Waffen-SS training ground SS-Truppenübungsplatz Heidelager in Pustków). Tensions were high, marked by early desertions and brawls with Ukrainian Waffen-SS recruits training at the same facility. The first Polish commander was Major Antoni Ignacy Kowalski, later replaced by Major Kazimierz Mięsowicz, and then Major Walery Sauermann. In August 1943, the unit swore an oath to fight "destructive Bolshevism". By late 1942, Polish officers were stripped of command, and German officers took full control. In Volhynia, the battalion witnessed the ongoing massacres of Polish civilians by the Ukrainian Insurgent Army (UPA).

Some Polish patrols also engaged in unauthorized, retaliatory pacification attacks against local Ukrainian villages and committed war crimes. Most notably the unit carried out brutal, unauthorized pacification operations against Ukrainian villages in Podłużne and Złazne. Similar raids occurred in Stawki, Hołowin, and Japołoć. Operating independently of German command in mid-1943, members of the battalion launched savage reprisal raids in response to UPA massacres of ethnic Poles. According to testimonies and wartime diaries from the unit's own personnel, these operations involved the total liquidation of entire communities. An eyewitness account from a soldier within the battalion vividly describes the scorched-earth tactics utilized during these raids:

"The village of Piłdłużne was surrounded and burned, the population shot down. Złazne burned down to a single hut... We burst out of the forest unexpectedly onto the villages and commit massacres... We lead away horses, cows, and pigs on wagons."

Testimonies from Japłoć quote:

"The village of Japołoć, the site of a three time ambush, was burned. women and children were shot dead."

"We made havoc in the village. Every Ukrainian peasant was taken out and shot."

In January 1943, the battalion was sent to Barysaw, Belarus, to guard supply lines and fight Soviet partisans. In April, they were subordinated to the infamous Dirlewanger unit for the anti-partisan operation "Lenz-Süd". The unit lost about 40 men during these actions. Later on, in January 1944, the heavily depleted battalion was pulled back to Lviv and then moved near Stuttgart, Germany. To continue fighting for poles,about half of the battalion deserted into the 27th Home Army Infantry Division, which defended the ethnic Polish population against the UPA massacres.

Despite the massive desertion, SS leadership noted that the remaining men fought well, and some had even received German combat medals. The unit was praised by SS-Obergruppenführer Hans-Adolf Prützmann.

On May 8, 1944, the battalion was officially disbanded by order of Heinrich Himmler. The remaining 150 men were reassigned to Radom and Częstochowa in small operational groups. As Soviet forces advanced, mass desertions continued, and the remaining remnants of the unit ceased to exist by August 1944.

== Background ==
During its formation, the battalion was stationed in Kraków on Michałowskiego Street (renamed Luxemburgstrasse under German occupation). Basic training took place in Dębica, and its first commandant was Captain Tschnadel. The members were equipped with green uniforms of the Ordnungspolizei (Orpo) and issued Mauser 98 rifles before being transferred to occupied Eastern Poland. Their primary role was to combat Soviet partisans behind the frontlines of Operation Barbarossa.

All Schutzmannschaften auxiliary police battalions were formed by the Germans from the inhabitants of occupied territories, such as the General Government, to support the German Sicherheitspolizei (security police), which was critically understaffed. At one point, the conscripted auxiliary police in occupied Eastern Poland included 5,000–12,000 Ukrainians and 2,000–2,200 Poles, who were often forced into opposition against each other.

Identified by Grzegorz Motyka as the Polnisches Schutzmannschaftsbataillon 202, the unit, upon transfer to Volhynia and Podolia, became subordinate to the German Schutzpolizei. The volunteer recruitment in Kraków yielded only two men. As a result, the Germans resorted to forcibly drafting professional members of the Blue Police from the city, which severely depleted the force crucial for combating property crimes and common banditry that had escalated following the 1939 invasion of Poland. Some individuals evaded the draft, prompting the Germans to use false advertisements offering paid work in the "Polish [not German] Police" as another method of recruitment.

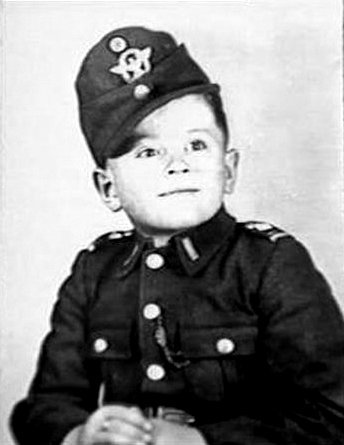
Henryk Slotwinski—"Child Mascot" of the Schutzmannschaft Battalion 202

German Major Walery Sauermann was appointed as the commander of the unit in the field, with all officers being German. In November 1943, more than half of the battalion deserted. Including all Volhynian Schutzmannschaften (not just Battalion 202), at least 700 Poles trained by the Germans joined the 27th Volhynian Division of the Armia Krajowa. One of the most widely quoted reasons among the Poles for joining the unit was the desire to protect civilians from the wave of massacres of Poles in Volhynia. In fact, this particular unit was the only German-trained Polish group involved in operations against the OUN-UPA.

The battalion was practically destroyed in combat with the Red Army in early 1944. The remaining members were transferred to Lwów (Lviv). Officially, the battalion was disbanded on 8 May 1944. The battalion was armed with Mauser Mk 98k rifles, as well as MP38 and MP41 submachine guns. It is believed that some of its former members later joined the Blue Police in the General Government.

== See also ==
- Schutzmannschaft Battalion 107

== Bibliography ==
- (in Polish) G. Motyka, M. Wierzbicki; "Polski policjant na Wołyniu" in Kwartalnik Historyczny KARTA 24, 1998, pp. 126–140, ISSN 0867-3764
- (in Ukrainian) Іван Дерейко. Місцеві формування німецької армії та поліції у Райхскомісаріаті «Україна». (1941–1944 роки).
