= Itzhak Katzenelson =

Poet

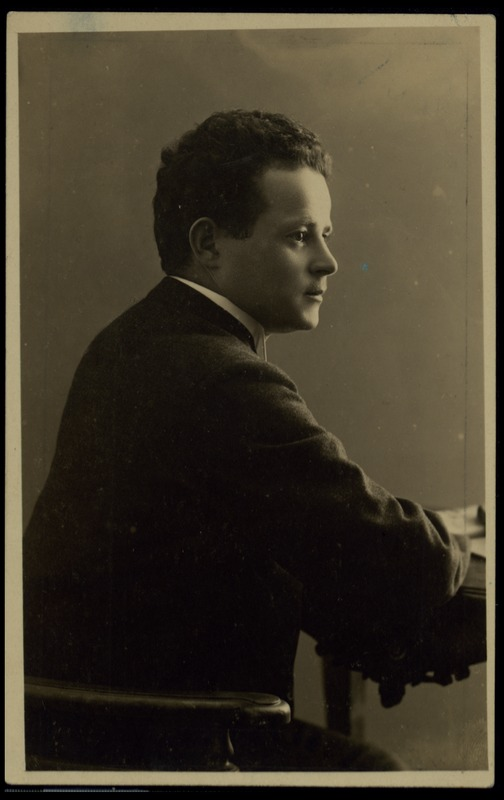
- Born: 1 July 1886; Karelichy, Minsk Governorate, Russian Empire
- Died: 1 May 1944 (aged 57); Auschwitz-Birkenau, German-occupied Poland

Itzhak Katzenelson (Yiddish: (יצחק קאַצ(ע)נעלסאָן(זון; also transcribed as Icchak-Lejb Kacenelson, Jizchak Katzenelson; Yitzhok Katznelson) (1 July 1886 – 1 May 1944) was a Polish Jewish teacher, poet and dramatist. He was born in 1886 in Karelichy near Minsk, and was murdered on 1 May 1944 in Auschwitz.

== Biography ==
Soon after his birth Katzenelson's family moved to Łódź, Poland, where he grew up. He worked as a teacher, founding a school, and as a dramatist in both Yiddish and Hebrew, starting a theatre group which toured Poland and Lithuania. Following the Invasion of Poland by Nazi Germany in 1939, he and his family fled to Warsaw, where they were trapped in the Warsaw Ghetto. There he ran an underground school for Jewish children. His wife and two of his sons were deported to the Treblinka extermination camp and murdered there.

Katzenelson participated in the Warsaw Ghetto Uprising, starting on 19 April 1943. To save his life, friends supplied him and his surviving son with forged Honduran passports. They managed to leave the ghetto but later ended up in Germans hands as part of the Hotel Polski affair. He was deported to a detention camp in Vittel, France, where the Nazis held American and British citizens and nationals of other Allied and neutral countries, for possible later prisoner exchange.

In Vittel, Katzenelson wrote "Song of the Murdered Jewish People" (Yiddish: דאָס ליד פון אױסגעהרגעטן יידישן פאָלק). He put the manuscript in bottles and buried them under a tree, where it was recovered after the war. A copy was sewn into a suitcase handle and later taken to Israel.

In late April 1944, Itzhak Katzenelson and his son Zvi were sent on a transport to the Auschwitz concentration camp, where they were murdered on 1 May 1944.

== Legacy ==
The Ghetto Fighters' House Holocaust and Jewish Resistance Heritage Museum in Israel, is named in his memory. "The Song of the Murdered Jewish People" has been translated into numerous languages and published as an individual volume.

== Published works ==
- Vittel Diary (22.v.43 – 16.9.43), Israel: Ghetto Fighters' House, 1964. Translated from the Hebrew by Dr. Myer Cohen; includes biographical notes and appendix of terms and place names.
- Le Chant du peuple juif assassiné, France: Bibliothèque Medem, 2005. Yiddish-French edition, French translation by Batia Baum, introduction by Rachel Ertel.
