= Hotel Polski =

Hotel in Śródmieście, Warsaw, Poland

Coordinates: 52°14′48″N 21°0′17″E

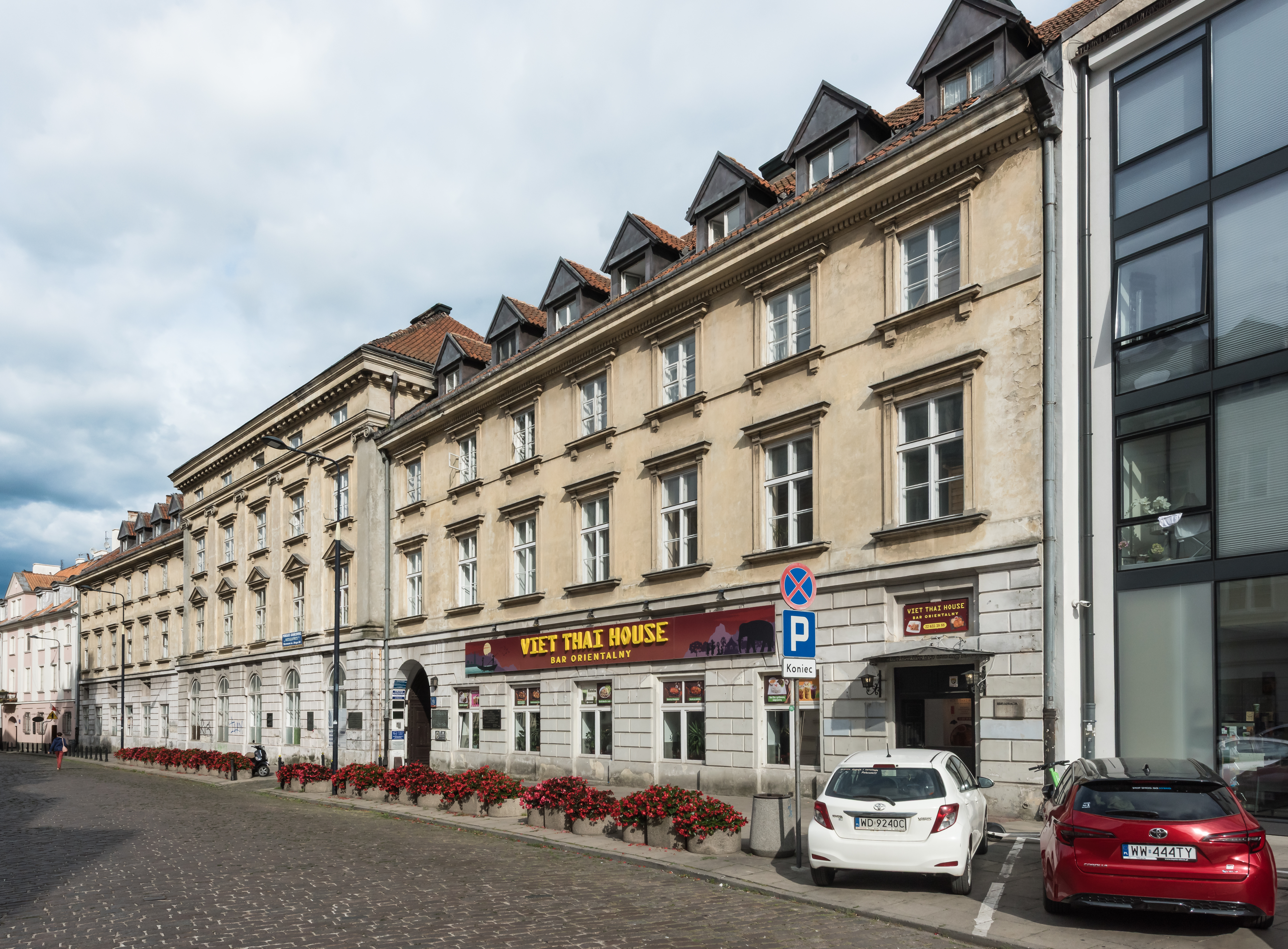
Facade of the former Hotel Polski in Warsaw.

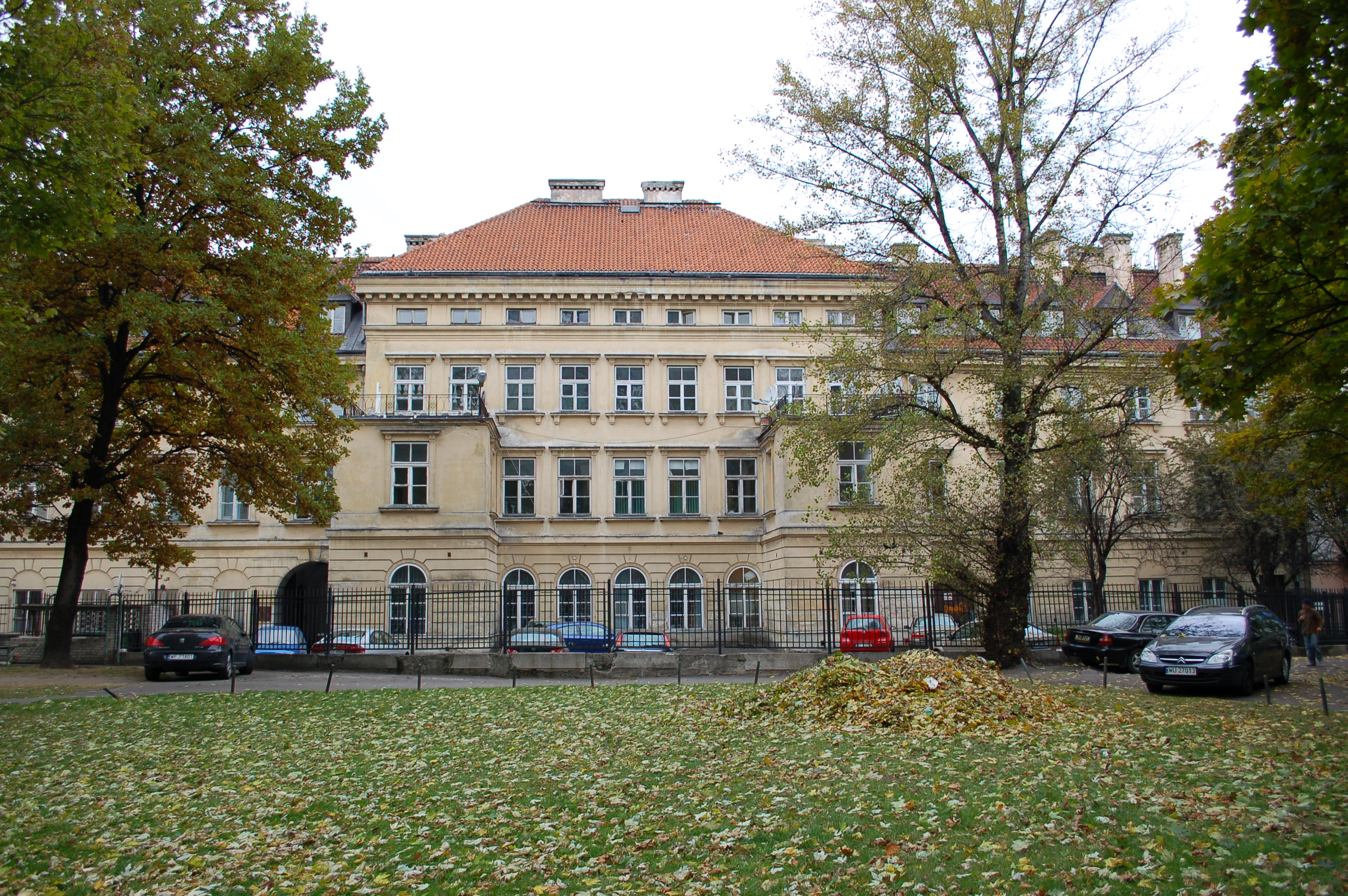
Rear facade of the former Hotel Polski in Warsaw.

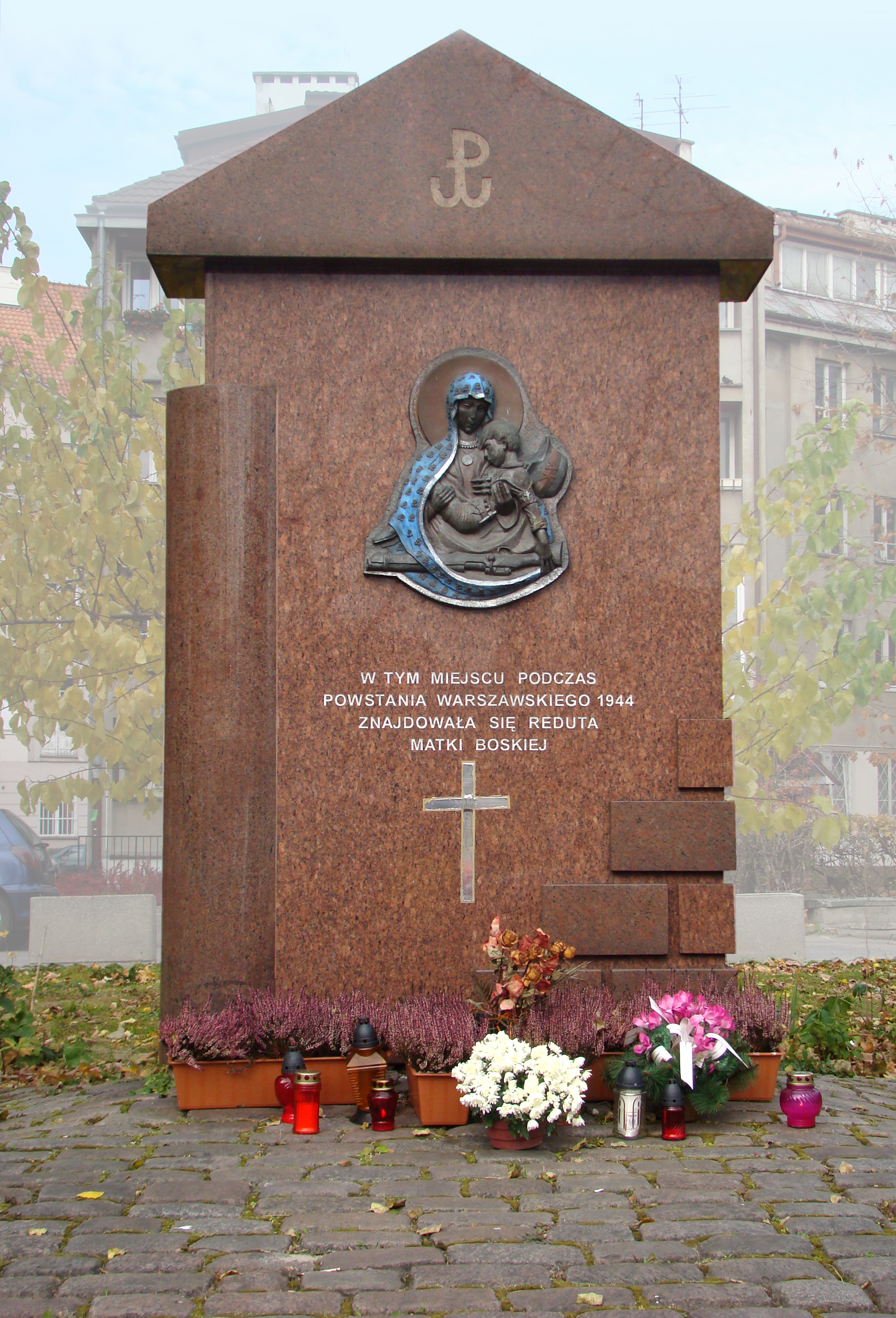
A monument commemorating the fighting in Hotel Polski location during the Warsaw Uprising

Hotel Polski (lit. Polish Hotel), opened in 1808, was a hotel in Śródmieście, Warsaw, Poland, at 29 Długa street.

In 1943, in the mop up operation following the liquidation of Warsaw Ghetto, the hotel was used by Germans as bait for Jews hiding in Warsaw. There the German agents and their Jewish collaborators pretended Jews could buy foreign passports and other documents, and then as foreign citizens, leave territories occupied by Nazi Germany. Approximately 2,500 Jews fell for this trap, with most subsequently arrested, moved to Nazi concentration camps, and perishing in The Holocaust. This case is known as "Hotel Polski Affair".

In 1944 during the Warsaw Uprising the building housed a Polish insurgent stronghold called the "Holy Mother Redoubt", named after a painting located there. The building was heavily damaged during the fighting and re-purposed following the war.

In 1965 the building was declared an object of cultural heritage and inscribed in the Polish heritage object registry. A commemoration plaque was unveiled at the building in 2013.

== Hotel Polski affair ==
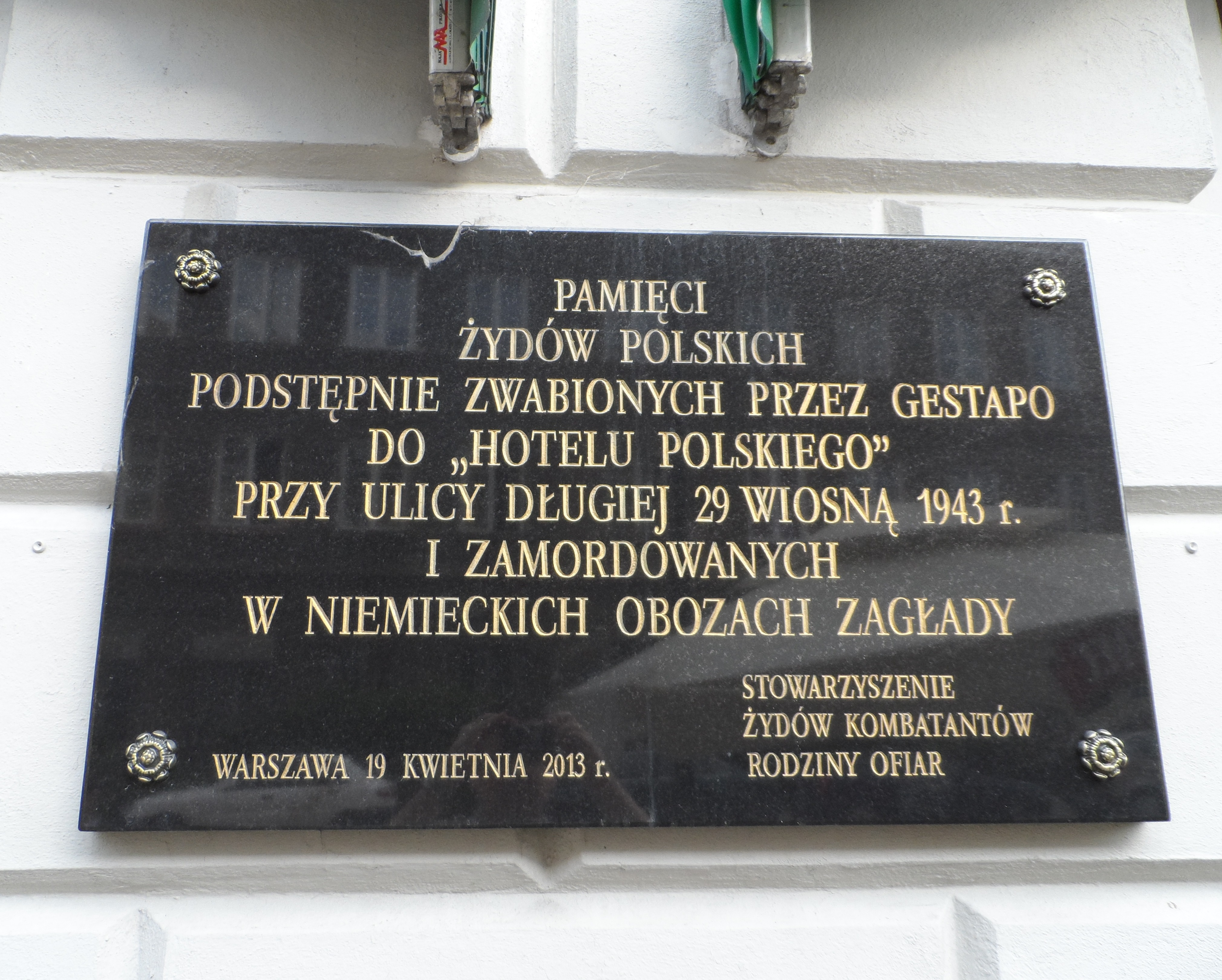
Plaque commemorating Polish Jews lured in and interned in this building by Gestapo through the spring of 1943, and subsequently murdered in the Holocaust.

Around late 1941, two Jewish organizations from Switzerland and Polish diplomats, working with honorary consuls from certain South American countries, started sending documents to the Warsaw Ghetto, hoping to allow Jews in the ghettos to emigrate (as Germans were more lenient towards individuals who could prove they were nationals of neutral countries). However, in many cases the holders of these affidavits and passports were already dead by the time those documents arrived in occupied Poland. Many if not all of those documents were intercepted by the Gestapo, or otherwise ended up in the hands of Jewish Gestapo collaborators from Gestapo-operated Żagiew network (most prominently, Leon Skosowski and Adam Żurawin).

The Warsaw Ghetto was liquidated by May 1943 but thousands of Jews survived in Warsaw, hiding outside the ghetto. The Germans and their Jewish collaborators came up with a plan to lure them out. (Skosowski's involvement in the plan was very significant, and he has been referred to as a co-organizer of the Hotel Polski plan). Another Jewish Gestapo collaborator involved in the Hotel Polski affair was the singer Wiera Gran. Collaborators spread the rumor that Jews holding foreign passports of neutral countries were allowed to leave the General Government, and that documents from countries such as Paraguay, Honduras, El Salvador, Peru and Chile, in the names of Jews who were no longer alive, were sold (at high prices, estimated in extreme cases to equal over a million US dollars) in Hotel Royal at 31 Chmielna street, and later at Hotel Polski. Unknown to the buyers, many such documents were improperly prepared or forged.

Hotel Polski became a gathering place for Jews who hoped they would soon be allowed to leave Nazi-occupied Europe, as rumors also suggested it would be safe ground. Around 2,500 Jews (estimates range as high as 3,500) came out of their hiding places and moved to Hotel Polski. The Polish Underground warned Jews that this was probably a trap, but many ignored the warnings. Starting May 21, 1943, Jews from Hotel Polski were transferred in small groups by Nazi German authorities to Vittel, a spa resort town in German-occupied France, which was supposed to be their transit point; later transports only made it to Bergen-Belsen concentration camp in Germany. On 15 July 1943, the 420 Jews remaining in the Hotel without foreign passports were executed by the Germans at Pawiak prison. By September 1943, the Germans revealed that most of the documents of the individuals in the transit camps were forged, and the South American governments refused to recognize most of the passports. Therefore, instead of being transferred to South America, the Jews were sent to Auschwitz concentration camp in May 1943 and October 1943. A few hundred Jews who held Palestinian documents survived, having been exchanged for Germans imprisoned in Palestine. (Jewish Historical Institute cited the number of survivors at 260; Haska estimates the number of survivors at about 300, noting that due to incomplete documentation it is not possible to precisely estimate the number of victims or survivors.) The Palestinian survivors were helped by Daniel Guzik, formerly associated with the American Jewish Joint Distribution Committee.

The Hotel Polski victims included poet Itzhak Katzenelson, Yiddish novelist Yehoshua Perle, and Jewish resistance leader Menachem Kirszenbaum as well as, probably, Polish dancer Franceska Mann.
