= Schutzmannschaft Battalion 107 =

Failed Nazi police unit

Schutzmannschaft Battalion 107 (German: Schutzmannschaftsbataillon 107) was a failed unit of Nazi German auxiliary police in semi-colonial General Government during World War II. Created in late 1943 in Volodymyr-Volynskyi (Włodzimierz Wołyński), the battalion did not take part in combat. It was made up of 450 local Poles from Volhynia under the German command, purposed to guard railway lines. In January 1944 the entire battalion deserted, and joined Armia Krajowa in defence of civilians against the wave of massacres of Poles in Volhynia.

Notably, there were no trained policemen there, in contrast to Polnisches Schutzmannschaftsbataillon 202 formed in Kraków from the regular Polish city-police called Einheimische Polizei (conscripted under the penalty of concentration camp); whose members also deserted to Polish 27th Home Army Infantry Division nevertheless.
