= Szmalcownik =

Polish collaborationist blackmailer

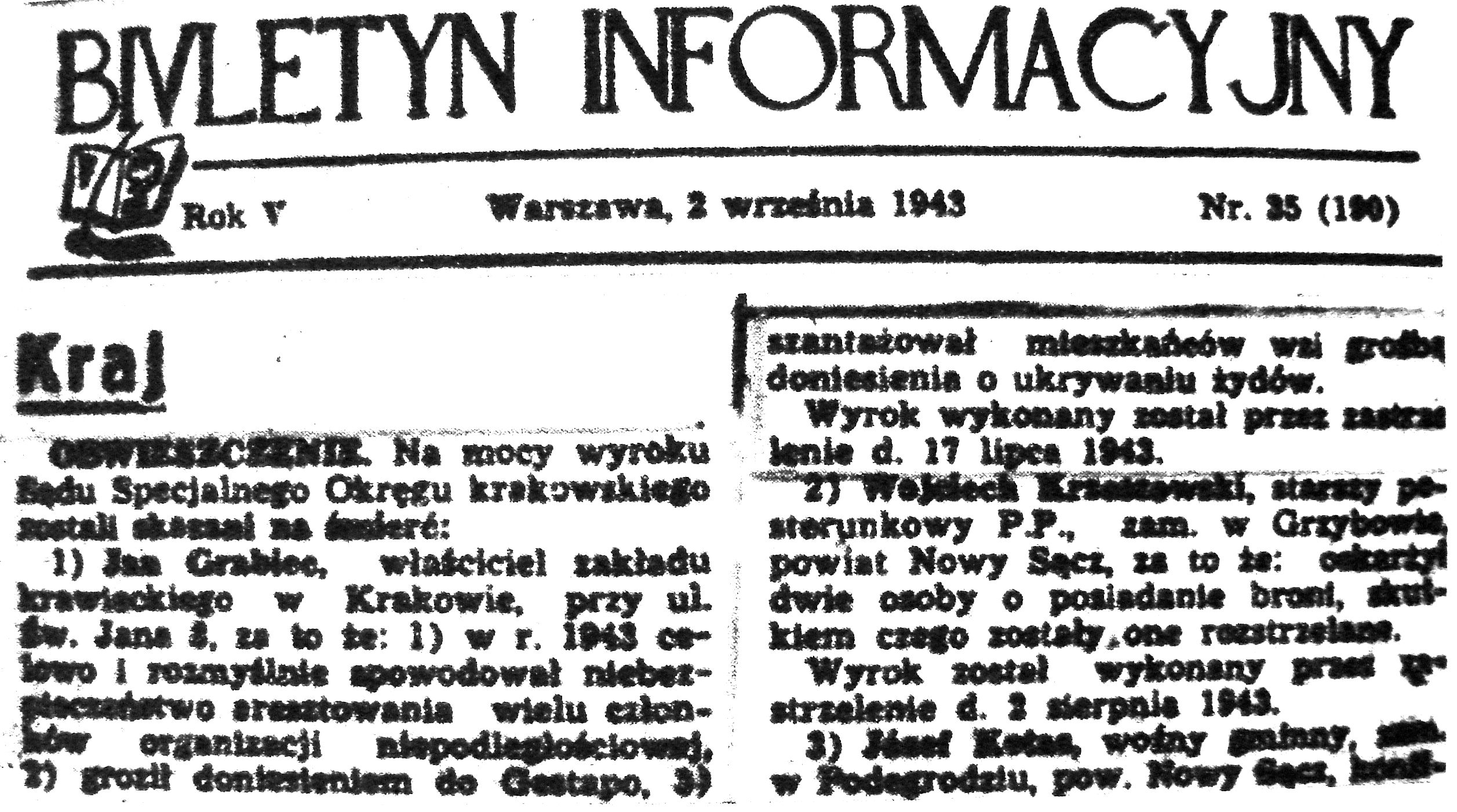
Polish underground Biuletyn Informacyjny (Information Bulletin), 2 September 1943, announcing death sentences carried out on collaborators, including a szmalcownik named Jan Grabiec

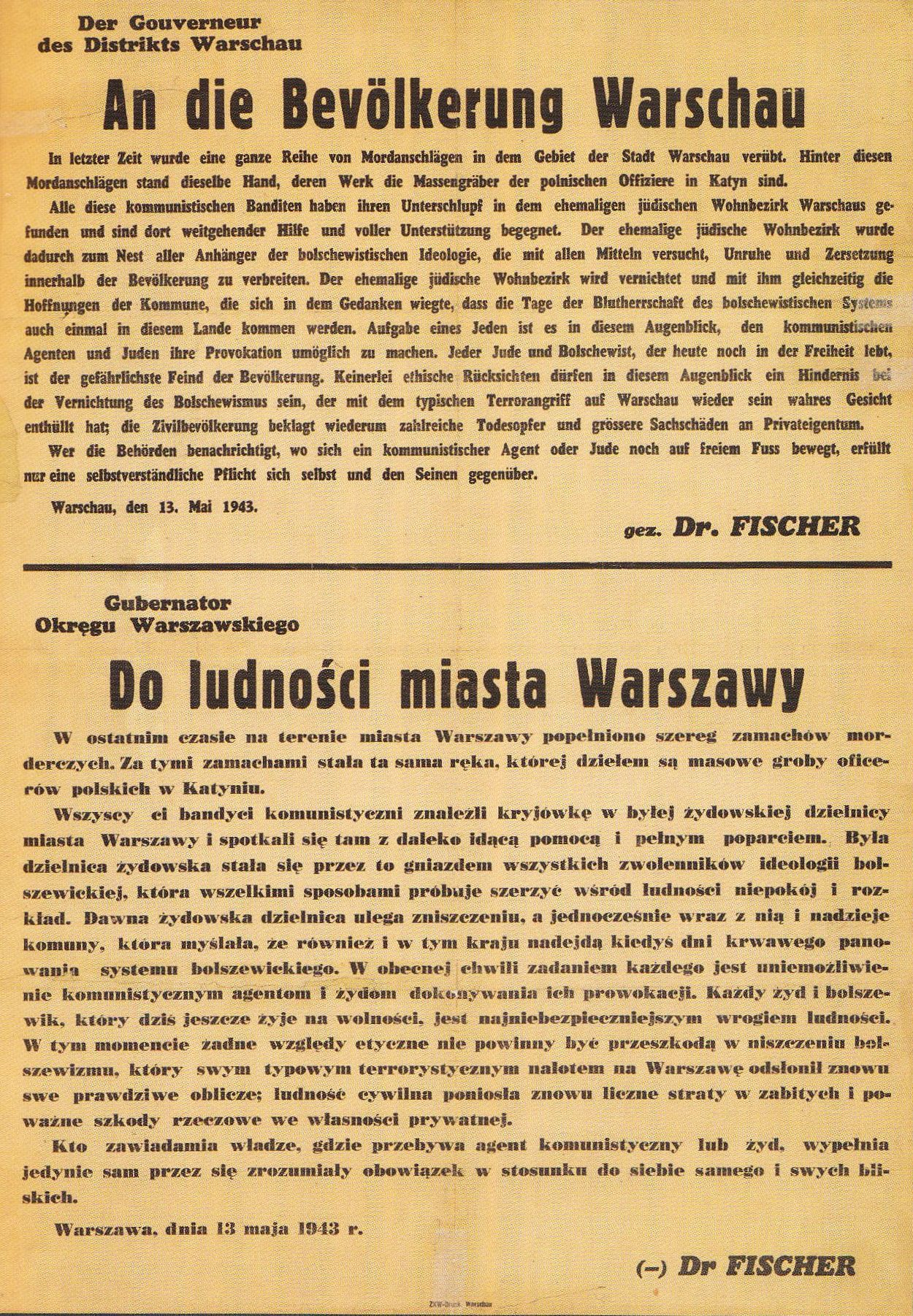
Announcement by the governor of the Warsaw District, Ludwig Fischer, of 13 May 1943, encouraging the inhabitants of Warsaw to hand over communist agents and Jews to the German authorities

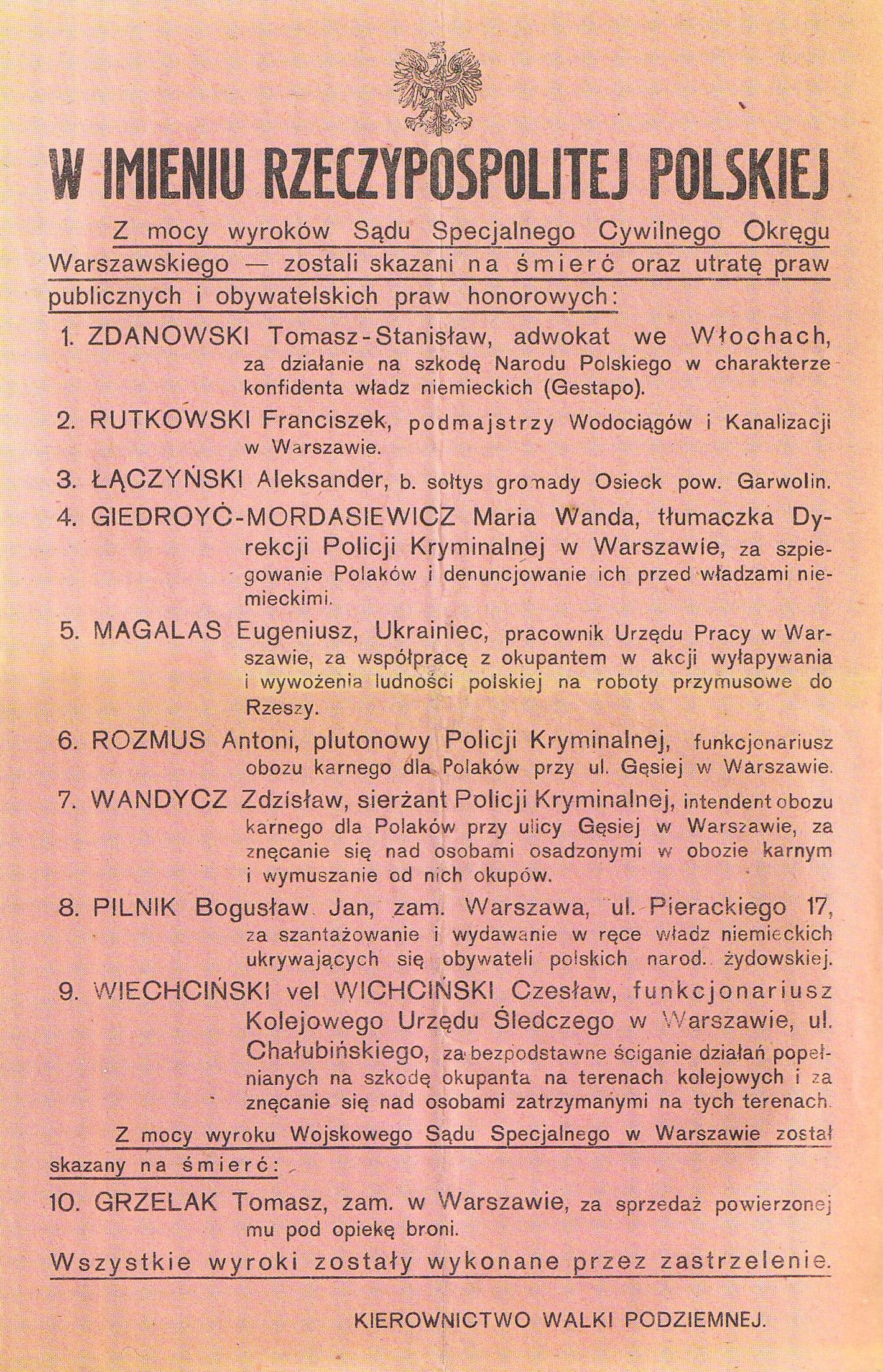
Directorate of Underground Resistance poster, September 1943, announcing death sentences carried out on collaborators, including Bogusław Jan Pilnik, sentenced for 'blackmailing, and delivering to German authorities, hiding Polish citizens of Jewish ethnicity"

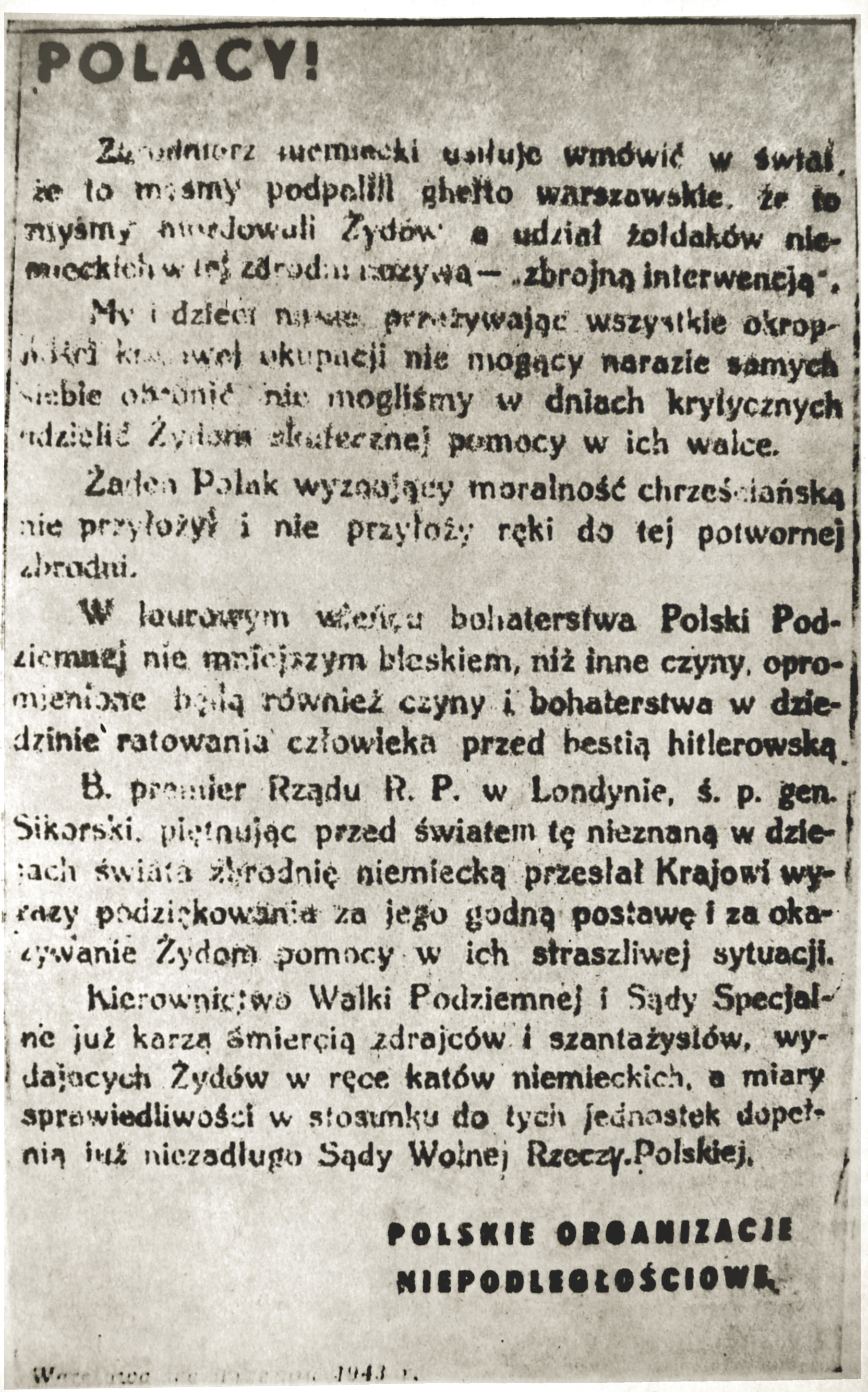
Żegota communiqué published in September 1943 warning that denunciation of Jews to the Nazis was a capital offence

Szmalcownik (Polish pronunciation: [ʂmalˈtsɔvɲik]); in English, also sometimes spelled shmaltsovnik) is a pejorative Polish slang expression that originated during the Holocaust in Poland in World War II and refers to a person who blackmailed Jews who were in hiding, or who blackmailed Poles who aided Jews, during the German occupation. By stripping Jews of their financial resources, blackmailers added substantially to the danger that Jews and their rescuers faced and increased their chances of being caught and killed.

In the capital of Poland, Warsaw, some 3,000–4,000 people acted as blackmailers and informants. In the summer of 1942, Żegota, a Polish underground organization dedicated to aiding the Jews, requested that the Polish Underground State intensify its efforts to stop the "blackmailer plague". In the summer of 1943, the Home Army began carrying out death sentences for szmalcowniks in occupied Poland, executing more than a dozen by the end of the war. The number and effect of these executions is disputed. A number of szmalcowniks were also tried in Poland after the war.

The phenomenon of blackmailing Jews during the Holocaust was not unique to Poland, and occurred throughout occupied Europe.

== Etymology ==
The term comes from the German word Schmalz (Polish phonetic spelling: szmalc, literally meaning "lard") and indicated the blackmailer's financial motive, i.e. the bribe to be paid by the victim. It originated in criminal jargon. Literally, therefore, szmalcownik can be translated as a greasy-palmer. In English, the term is often used as a synonym of blackmailer, but in Polish works, based on the wartime parlance, a distinction is sometimes made between szmalcowniks, who acted more like one-time muggers, accosting their victims on the street and demanding a bribe, and the more dangerous blackmailers, who tracked their victims to their hiding places and demanded everything they had. The term is also sometimes described in English as a bounty hunter, as the Germans offered financial rewards, described as bounties, for turning in the Jews.

== Demographics ==
Szmalcowniks came from diverse backgrounds. About three-quarters were ethnic Poles, but members of the German, Ukrainian and Lithuanian minorities – and in some cases even Jews – were also engaged in blackmailing. Most known szmalcowniks were men aged 25–40. Some were collaborating with the Gestapo or other German officials, or with the Polish Blue Police, in addition to blackmailing. Recent research suggests that contrary to popular belief, szmalcowniks were not necessarily habitual criminals before the war; out of 200 individuals tried by German courts in Warsaw between 1940 and 1943, only 11 involved pre-war criminals.

According to Jan Grabowski, "there are mentions of szmalcowniki in all of the accounts by Jews hiding on the 'Aryan side' of Warsaw. The sheer number of mentions is a direct (though difficult to quantify) evidence of the prevalence of this practice." Gunnar S. Paulsson estimates the total number of szmalcowniks in Warsaw at "as high as 3–4 thousand", targeting the Jewish community (in hiding on the "Aryan" side, outside the Warsaw Ghetto) of about 28,000 and their gentile helpers, who numbered about 70,000–90,000, with the remaining few hundred thousand of the city's inhabitants remaining passive in this struggle.

== Effects ==
From 1941 onwards, Jews who were found without a valid pass outside ghettos and camps were subject to the death penalty, as were any individuals aiding them. The Germans issued monetary rewards (sometimes described as bounties) for turning in the hiding Jews. Szmalcowniks would extort Jews for money and valuables, and after the victims were robbed of everything of value, they would often be turned in for the bounty. Many hiding Jews were easy to recognize by distinctive physical features, accents and vocabulary, culinary preferences, lack of knowledge about Polish Christian customs, and even excessive purchase of food supplies. At the beginning of the German occupation, szmalcowniks were satisfied with a few hundred zlotys, but after the death penalty for hiding Jews was introduced, the sums rose to several hundred thousand zlotys. The activities of szmalcowniks intensified during the era of the liquidation of the ghettos (1942–1944).

The damage that szmalcowniks did to the Jewish community was substantial. By stripping Jews of assets they needed to survive, harassing rescuers, raising the overall level of insecurity and forcing hidden Jews to seek safer accommodations, blackmailers added substantially to the danger that Jews and their Polish rescuers faced, and increased their risk of capture and death.

In some cases, szmalcownik gangs blackmailed each other, or even people working with Gestapo agents, which would lead to the arrest of one group. Approximately 200 such szmalcowniks were prosecuted by the German Special Court in Warsaw (Sondergericht Warschau) for bribing German soldiers, pretending to be Gestapo agents and forging identity papers. The penalties imposed usually ranged from a few months to a few years of imprisonment, although in some cases the Gestapo were known to carry out summary executions; for example, two szmalcowniks were executed for falsely accusing a German lawyer of being a Jew. In general, however, German authorities were not concerned with the activities of szmalcowniks, instead encouraging them.

== Countermeasures ==
The Polish Underground State considered collaboration a treasonous act punishable by death, and attempted to counteract the activities of szmalcowniks and informers from the beginning of the German occupation. One way in which it tried to hinder such activities was by publishing public condemnations in posters, leaflets and the underground press, though these rarely addressed crimes against Jews specifically. The first announcement by the Directorate of Underground Resistance that crimes against Jews and Poles would be punishable by death was made on 17 September 1942. After the founding of Żegota (Council to Aid Jews with the Government Delegation for Poland) later that month, its representatives repeatedly appealed to the Underground State to act against blackmailers, but for the most part were told that "nothing could be done" because such acts would require a judicial process, which was said to be impossible to conduct during the occupation. Żegota's request for an explicit condemnation of anti-Jewish activities was answered seven months later, on 18 March 1943. The communist Polski Komitet Wyzwolenia Narodowego (Polish Committee of National Liberation) issued a similar decree more than a year later, on 31 August 1944.

Executions carried out by the Polish underground were approved by an underground court, which was meant to ensure that no innocents would be killed by accident. Except for gang leaders, identifying individual blackmailers was difficult, as they were often anonymous; however, they were identified and punished much more often than street muggers, who were even more difficult to identify. Some executions required considerable planning, since carrying arms carried significant risks. The first execution of a szmalcownik by the Home Army took place on 4 March 1943, and the next day the Jewish Fighting Organization (primarily active in the Warsaw Ghetto) announced that it had executed five Jewish collaborators. There is at least one documented incident in which communist resistance fighters of Gwardia Ludowa in Warsaw executed one or more szmalcowniks in 1943. In early 1944, after Żegota lobbied to speed up the process, the Directorate authorized executions at the discretion of local resistance authorities, and in 1943–1944 executions of szmalcowniks became more frequent.

The extent and effectiveness of the countermeasures is subject to debate. Approximately 30% of the Underground courts' executions in Warsaw were of szmalcowniks, but the exact number is unknown; Dariusz Libionka estimated the number of szmalcowniks executed in Warsaw at under twenty.

According to Samuel Kassow, who analysed the Emanuel Ringelblum Archives, "even in the relatively simple matter of suppressing the blackmailers and informants who plagued Jews on the Aryan side, the underground state could not be bothered." Overall, Jan Grabowski concludes, "engaging in blackmailing did not entail a significant risk... [it] was not a priority [to the underground], and the few sentences handed down by the underground courts usually involved not only Jews, but also Poles." According to Joseph Kermish, the underground's proclamations were left mostly "on paper", and the number of executions remained low; Joanna Drzewieniecki notes that "new research seems to indicate that Underground trials and executions did not take place as often and nor were they as much of a deterrent as historians once thought". Michael Marrus notes, however, that some 150 executions of informers that took place by April 1943, although not in response to blackmailing, had a positive effect on the phenomenon. According to him, "more death sentences than reported were being carried out". Marrus argues that while the executions did not eliminate the problem of blackmailers, they "reduced it so much" that it was no longer an issue of "primary importance" to Żegota.

== Aftermath ==
Some szmalcowniks were tried in Poland after the war. In 1956 the crime of szmalcownictwo was subject to an amnesty, which however excluded individuals who were proven to have taken part in a murder.

== See also ==
- Żagiew
