= Mikołaj Kunicki =

Polish military officer (1914–2001)

Mikołaj Kunicki (1914 – 2001) was a Polish soldier, who also served in the German auxiliary units (Kompanieführer in Schutzmannschaft 104), and later became commander of the Polish-Soviet Rally Brigade Partisan (in the rank of captain).

== Biography ==
In 1939, he participated in the September campaign. He fought to defend Warsaw. In 1939, he escaped from German captivity and returned to his family home. In 1942, he was called to serve in Schutzmannschaft, in Kobryn. From March to November 1942, he was in training at the German military school in Kobrin (sabotage-diversion). He graduated from the field of Feldwebel. From January 1943, the company commander in the 104 Batalion Schutzmannschaft, which liquidated, among others UPA branches near Wysocka. After the attack of Ukrainian militias on Polish villages and then the refusal of the German command to retaliate against the Ukrainians, he and his company (150 soldiers) deserted.

In March 1943, he made contact with the Soviet partisans, and then joined them, killing the German commanders. He merged with the group of General Vasily Begma. On August 3, 1943, he took command of the United Polish Partisans unit. Tadeusz Kościuszko in Volhynia, subordinated to the General Staff in Moscow and to General Begma.

In July 1944, Kunicki merged his branch near Otryt in the Bieszczady Mountains with the branch of the Polish self-defense of Józef Pawłusiewicz. He also cooperated with the Soviet partisan unit under the command of Leonid Berenstein. Kunicki's unit fought numerous fights with smaller German units, the Ukrainian police, and then with the UPA.

Mikołaj Kunicki as a retired colonel lived in Zamość during the Polish People's Republic. After World War II, Kunicki published his memoirs.
