= Jan Emil Skiwski =

Jan Emil Skiwski - (13 February 1894, Warsaw - 2 March 1956, Caracas) was a Polish writer, journalist, and literary critic.

An extremist adherent of National Democracy and fascism, he became a supporter of political and military cooperation with Nazi Germany after 1939. He published pro-Nazi articles in General Government (''Przełom'' and Ster'').

In April 1943, like other writers: Ferdynand Goetel and Józef Mackiewicz, he stayed in Katyn, where he witnessed the exhumation of Polish officers murdered by the Soviets. After returning, he gave several interviews to the German-language press. He talked about the shock he suffered at the sight of the Katyn graves. In them, he blamed the Soviets, saying that Polish officers "had to die because they represented European culture," he says. He also blamed the Jews: "Cheka's murderers were usually Jews headed by Jagoda. Jews are more likely to murder Poles on their own, taking revenge for pre-war symptoms of anti-Semitism in Poland."

In February 1945, Skiwski and his family, fleeing the Red Army entering Kraków, went to Breslau (now Wrocław in Poland), and from there to the seat of Hans Frank in Neuhas near Munich. Later Skiwski arrived in the Austrian town of Kufstein, where he waited for the American troops to enter.

On June 13, 1949, Jan Emil Skiwski was convicted in absentia by the District Court in Kraków, pursuant to the Decree of the Polish National Liberation Committee of July 31, 1944, on life imprisonment.

From 1947, he lived and died in Caracas, Venezuela.
