= Gabriel N. Finder =

Historian of Central and East European Jews and professor at University of Virginia

Gabriel N. Finder is a historian of Central and East European Jews and professor at University of Virginia.

== Works ==
- Finder, Gabriel N.; Aleksiun, Natalia; Polonsky, Antony, eds. (2008). Making Holocaust Memory. Littman Library of Jewish Civilization. ISBN 978-1-904113-05-8.
- Laura, Jockusch; Finder, Gabriel N., eds. (2015). Jewish Honor Courts: Revenge, Retribution, and Reconciliation in Europe and Israel after the Holocaust. Wayne State University Press. ISBN 978-0-8143-3878-0.
- Finder, Gabriel N.; Prusin, Alexander V. (2018). Justice behind the Iron Curtain: Nazis on Trial in Communist Poland. University of Toronto Press. ISBN 978-1-4426-2538-9.
