= Stawki =

Stawki may refer to the following places in Poland:

- Stawki Landscape Park, a protected area in Silesian Voivodeship (southern Poland)
- Stawki, Kuyavian-Pomeranian Voivodeship (north-central Poland)
- Stawki, Janów County in Lublin Voivodeship (east Poland)
- Stawki, Włodawa County in Lublin Voivodeship (east Poland)
- Stawki, Kozienice County in Masovian Voivodeship (east-central Poland)
- Stawki, Gmina Dobra in Greater Poland Voivodeship (west-central Poland)
- Stawki, Gmina Władysławów in Greater Poland Voivodeship (west-central Poland)
- Stawki, Warmian-Masurian Voivodeship (north Poland)
