= Gunnar S. Paulsson =

- Born: 24 October 1946 (age 79); Uppsala, Sweden
- Occupations: Historian; Author

Academic background
- Education: Carleton University; University of Toronto; Oxford University

Academic work
- Era: 20th century
- Main interests: The Holocaust
- Notable works: Secret City: The Hidden Jews of Warsaw 1940-1945

Gunnar Svante Paulsson (also known as Steve Paulsson) is a Swedish-born Canadian historian, university lecturer, and author who has taught in Britain, Canada, Germany, and Italy. He specializes in history of The Holocaust and has been described as "an expert on that period". He is best known for his 2002 book, Secret City: The Hidden Jews of Warsaw 1940-1945.

== Education and career ==
Paulsson graduated from Carleton University in 1968 with a degree in psychology and worked in an unrelated career until 1989 when he began graduate study in history at the University of Toronto. He completed a D.Phil. (Ph.D.) in Modern History in 1998 at Oxford University, while simultaneously holding the position of Lecturer and Director of the Stanley Burton Centre for Holocaust Studies at the University of Leicester in 1994–98. He then served as the Senior Historian in the Holocaust Exhibition Project Office at the Imperial War Museum in London in 1998–2000. He was the Koerner visiting fellow and lecturer at the Oxford Centre for Hebrew and Jewish Studies, and Pearl Resnick fellow at the Center for Advanced Holocaust Studies at the US Holocaust Memorial Museum. He has also taught at the University of Toronto, Viadrina University and the University of Siena.

Paulsson is best known for his book, Secret City: The Hidden Jews of Warsaw 1940-1945 (Yale University Press, 2002), and his article, "The Bridge over the Øresund: the Historiography on the Expulsion of the Jews from Denmark, 1943."

== Secret City ==
Paulsson's book, Secret City, is a social history of the Jews who escaped from the Warsaw ghetto and tried to survive, living illegally "on the Aryan side". In its original form as his doctoral thesis, it was awarded the Franklin Prize in Contemporary History (1998). The English edition was awarded the biennial PSA/Orbis (now Kulczycki Prize) in 2004, and the Polish edition, Utajone Miasto: Żydzi po "aryjskiej" stronie Warszawy 1940-1945 (Znak, 2007) was awarded the inaugural Moczarski Prize (pl) for the 2009 best book in history.

== Works ==
Books

- Gunnar S. Paulsson (2002), Secret City: The Hidden Jews of Warsaw, 1940-1945. New Haven: Yale University Press, ISBN 978-0-300-09546-3. Sample Review.
- Published in Poland as Utajone miasto: Żydzi po aryjskiej stronie Warszawy 1940-1945 (Znak, 2008) Translator Elzbieta Olender-Dmowska; Editors, Barbara Engelking & Jacek Leociak
- Gunnar S. Paulsson (2000), The Holocaust Exhibition at the Imperial War Museum (Imperial War Museum, 2000)
- Editor of Barbara Engelking, Holocaust and Memory (Leicester University Press, 2000)

Articles and book chapters

- Gunnar S. Paulsson (2011), "Lies, Damned Lies and Statistics: A reply to Havi Dreifuss", Gal-ed: On the History and Culture of the Polish Jews, vol. 23(2011)
- Gunnar S. Paulsson (2004). "The Demography of Jews in Hiding in Warsaw". The Holocaust: Critical Concepts in Historical Studies. London: Routledge. ISBN 0-415-27509-1. (Originally in Polin 13(2000) 78–103)
- Gunnar S. Paulsson (2004). "The Bridge over the Øresund: The Historiography on the Expulsion of the Jews from Denmark, 1943". The Holocaust: Critical Concepts in Historical Studies. London: Routledge. ISBN 0-415-27509-1. (originally in the Journal of Contemporary History, 30(1995) pp. 431–464)
- Gunnar S. Paulsson (2003), "Ringelblum Revisited: Polish-Jewish Relations in Occupied Warsaw, 1940–1945," in Joshua D. Zimmerman, ed., Contested Memories: Poles and Jews during the Holocaust and Its Aftermath (New Brunswick, New Jersey and London: Rutgers University Press, 2003).
- Gunnar S. Paulsson (2001), "Evading the Holocaust: The Unexplored Continent of Holocaust Historiography," in John K. Roth and Elisabeth Maxwell, eds., Remembering for the Future: The Holocaust, in an Age of Genocide (Houndmills, Basingstoke, Hampshire and New York: Palgrave), volume 1/2001.
- Gunnar S. Paulsson (2000), "The Demography of Jews in Hiding in Warsaw, 1943–1945," Polin: Studies in Polish Jewry, volume 13(2000).

== Awards ==
- 1998 Fraenkel Prize in Contemporary History, awarded by the Institute of Contemporary History for "the best unpublished manuscript in one of the Institute's areas of interest (the two World Wars, extremist political movements of the left and right, East European and Jewish history)"
- 2004 Biennial Polish Studies Association/Orbis Prize for "the best first book in English on any aspect of Polish affairs published in the past two years"
- 2009 Inaugural Kazimierz Moczarski Prize for "the best historical book published in Poland in the past year" (for the Polish edition, Utajone miasto)

== Notes and references ==
- Secret City book page (with note about the author)
