= History of Poles in the United States =

The history of Poles in the United States dates to the American Colonial era. Poles have lived in present-day United States territories for over 400 years—since 1608. There are 10 million Americans of Polish descent in the U.S. today. Polish Americans have always been the largest group of Slavic origin in the United States.

Historians divide Polish American immigration into three big waves, the largest lasting from 1870 to 1914, a second after World War II, and a third after Poland's regime change in 1989. Before those major waves, there was a small but steady trickle of migrants from Poland to the Thirteen Colonies and early United States, mainly comprising religious dissenters, skilled tradesmen, and adventurous nobles. Most Polish Americans are descended from the first major wave immigrants, which consisted of millions of Poles who departed parts of Poland annexed by Germany, Russia, and Austria. This migration is often called in Polish za chlebem (for the bread), because most of the migrants were impoverished peasants, who owned little or no land, and often lacked basic subsistence. Large part of those lower class migrants came from the Austro-Hungarian province of Galicia, arguably the most destitute region in Europe at the time. Up to a third of Poles living in the United States returned to Poland after a few years, but the majority stayed. Substantial research and sociological works such as The Polish Peasant in Europe and America found that many Polish immigrants shared a common objective of acquiring farming land in the U.S. or making enough money to do the same back in Poland. Anti-migrant legislation substantially lowered Polish immigration in the period from 1921 to 1945, but it rose again after World War II to include many displaced persons from the Holocaust. 1945–1989, coinciding with the Communist rule in Poland, is the period of the second wave of Polish immigration to the U.S. A third, much smaller wave, came in 1989 after Poland transitioned to a multiparty market democracy.

Immigrants in all three waves were attracted by the high wages and ample job opportunities for unskilled manual labor in the United States, and were driven to jobs in American mining, meatpacking, construction, steelwork, and heavy industry—in many cases dominating these fields until the mid-20th century. Over 90% of Poles arrived and settled in communities with other Polish immigrants. These communities are called Polonia and the largest such community historically was in Chicago, Illinois. A key feature of Polish life in the Old World had been religion, and in the United States, Catholicism often became an integral part of Polish identity. In the United States, Polish immigrants created communities centered on Catholic religious services, and built hundreds of churches and parish schools in the 20th century.

The Polish today are well assimilated into American society. Average incomes have increased from well below average to above average today, and Poles continue to expand into white-collar professional and managerial roles. Poles are still well represented in blue collar construction and industrial trades, and many live in or near urban cities. They are well dispersed throughout the United States, intermarry at high levels, and have a very low rate of fluency in their ethnic language (less than 5% can speak Polish).

== 17th century ==
=== Virginia Colony ===
The first Polish immigrants came to the Jamestown colony in 1608, twelve years before the Pilgrims arrived in Massachusetts. These early settlers were brought as skilled artisans by the English soldier–adventurer Captain John Smith, and included a glass blower, a pitch and tar maker, a soap maker and a timberman. Historian John Radzilowski stated that these Poles were experts in pitch and tar making at the time and recruited to develop a key naval stores industry. He estimated that "two dozen Poles" at most were in the colony by 1620. In 1947, a purported historical diary, Pamiętnik handlowca (A Memoir of a Merchant) was rumored to have surfaced in the United States which was to have been written by one of the original Polish settlers. (Note: No copy of the original text is known to exist.) Nonetheless, the Polish colonists led a strike in 1619 to protest their disenfranchisement in the New World; they had been excluded from voting rights by the first-ever legislative body. Their strike was the first labor protest in the New World.

The date of their arrival, October 1, 1608, is a commemorative holiday for Polish-Americans. Polish American Heritage Month is based on this month, and October 1 is commemorated annually in Polonia organizations. 2008 was considered the 400-year anniversary of Polish settlement in the United States, and 2019 is looked upon as the 400th celebration of the Jamestown strike, considered a fight for civil liberties, more specifically, their voting rights, and equal recognition regardless of ethnicity.

=== Religious exodus of Polish Protestants ===
Protestant Poles left Poland for America seeking greater religious freedom. This was not due to the Counter-Reformation in Poland; in Poland, the Jesuits spread Catholicism chiefly by promoting religious education among the youth. After the Swedish Deluge, Polish Brethren, who were seen as Swedish sympathizers, were told to convert or leave the country. The Polish Brethren were banished by law from Poland in 1658, and faced physical fights, seizure of property, and court fines for preaching their religion. Polish exiles originally sought refuge in England, but lacking support, sought peace in America. The majority of exiled Poles arrived in New Sweden, although some had gone to New Amsterdam and the English Virginia colony. There is no evidence of Polish immigration to Catholic Spanish or French territories in North America in the 17th century, which historian Frank Mocha suggests is a signal that early Poles were Protestants and wanted to live with Protestants in America. These Poles were generally well educated and aristocratic. One known immigrant, pioneer Anthony Sadowski, had come from an area populated by Moravian Brethren and Arians in the Sandomierz Voivodeship of the Polish–Lithuanian Commonwealth, consistent with a religious exodus. Research has confirmed that one of his first actions upon arrival was visiting a Polish Protestant colony in New Jersey. He and his uncle, Stanisław Sadowski, converted to Calvinism before fleeing Poland. Abrycht Zaborowski (Zabriskie), a Polish Lutheran nobleman, arrived in the colonies in 1662. His grandson, Peter Zabriskie, was a friend and officer of George Washington. Protestants (and other non-Catholics) regained their rights and religious freedoms in Poland in 1768, ending pressure to leave Poland on religious grounds.

== 18th century ==
=== American Revolution ===
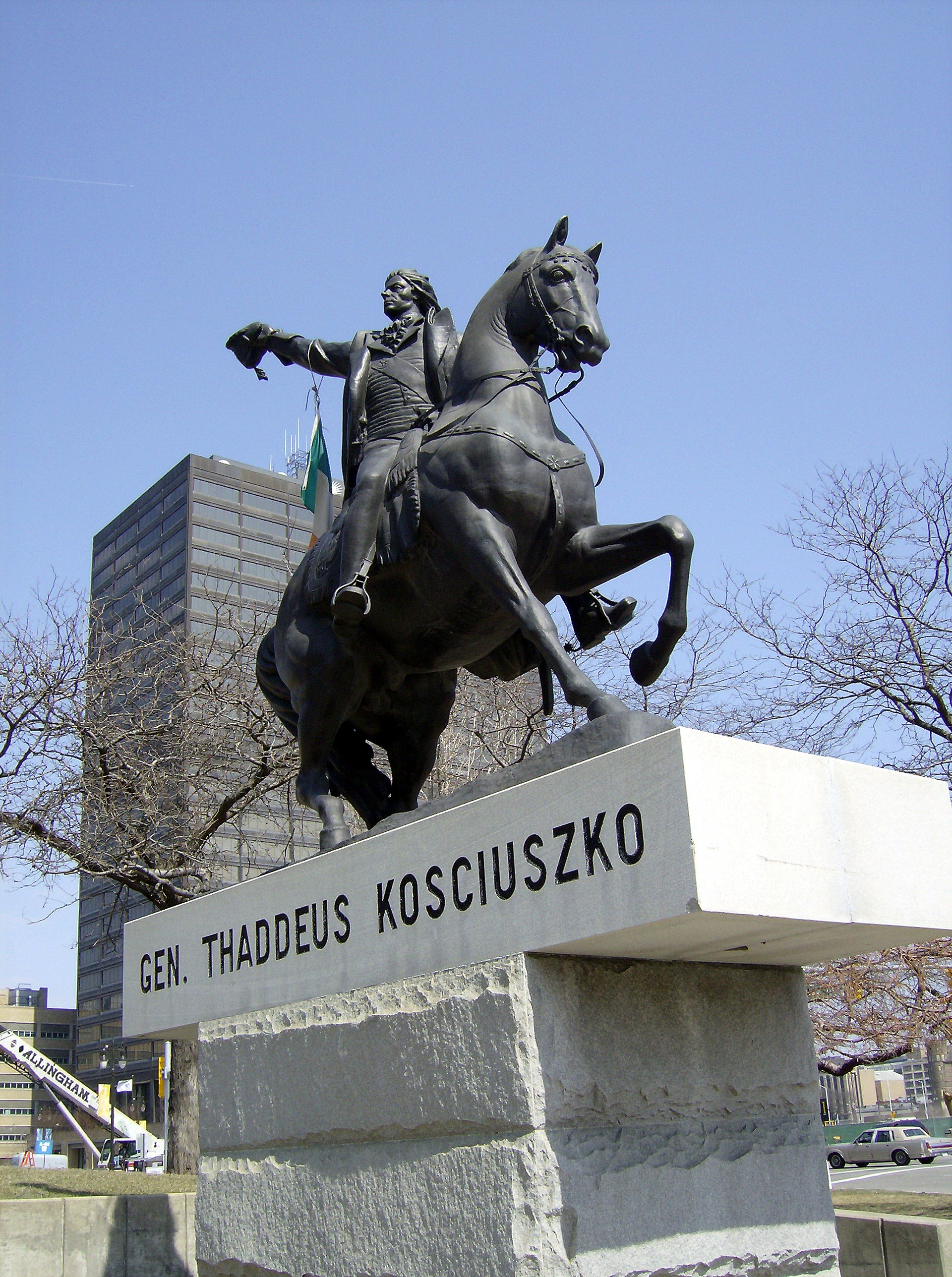
Kościuszko statue, Detroit

Later Polish immigrants included Jakub Sadowski, who in 1770, settled in New York with his sons—the first Europeans to penetrate as far as Kentucky. It is said that Sandusky, Ohio, was named after him, although the name is more likely derived from the Wyandot language in which "sa-un-dus-tee" means "water within pools" or "cold water". At the time, Polish–Lithuanian Commonwealth was failing and being gradually stripped of its independence due to military partitions by foreign powers, a number of Polish patriots, among them Casimir Pulaski and Tadeusz Kościuszko, left for America to fight in the American Revolutionary War.

Pulaski, having led the losing side of a civil war, escaped a death sentence by leaving for America. There, he served as Brigadier-general in the Continental Army and commanded its cavalry. He saved General George Washington's army at the Battle of Brandywine and died leading a cavalry charge at the Siege of Savannah, aged 31. Pułaski later become known as the "father of American cavalry". He is also commemorated in Casimir Pulaski Day and the Pulaski Day Parade.

Kościuszko was a professional military officer who served in the Continental Army in 1776 and was instrumental in the victories at the Battle of Saratoga and West Point. After returning to Poland, he led the failed Polish insurrection against Russia which ended with the Partition of Poland in 1795. Pułaski and Kościuszko both have statues in Washington, D.C.

One of other notable Polish Americans of the Revolutionary Era was Peter Zabriskie, a patriot and colonel in the Revolutionary Army, who opened his home in Hackensack to General Washington during the retreat from New York. General Washington came there after attempting to survey Mount Washington and learning of the attack on the troops stationed there. Writing to Congress from Hackensack concerning the surrender of troops at Mount Washington and the loss of material and cannon. Also to advise Congress of the British advance of troops in New Jersey to attack the Army, and General Washington's lack of forces to oppose them. His plan to Congress was retreat of forces and material across the Passaic River. Which was accomplished and further to Newark, New Brunswick, and Trenton. Peter Zabriskie became a judge in Bergen County and one of three Ratifying Signers to the Constitution for Bergen County, New Jersey.

After the Revolution, Americans who commented generally held positive views of the Polish people. Polish music such as mazurkas and krakowiaks were popular in the U.S. during the antebellum period. However, after the Civil War (1861–65) the image turned negative and Poles were stereotyped as crude and uneducated people who were not good fits for America socially or culturally.

== 19th century ==
=== Early settlements ===
==== Panna Maria, Texas ====
The first immigrants from Poland were Silesians from the Prussian partition of Poland. They settled in Texas in 1854, creating an agricultural community that carried their native traditions, customs, and language. The land they chose was bare, unpopulated countryside, and they erected the homes, churches, and municipal accommodations as a private community. The first home built by a Pole is the John Gawlik House, constructed 1858. The building still stands, and displays a high-pitched roof common in Eastern European architecture. The Poles in Texas built brick houses with thatched roofs until the 1900s. That region in Texas is subject to less than 1 inch of snow per year, and meteorological studies show that level of insulation is unwarranted. The Polish Texans modified their homes from their European models, building shaded verandas to escape the subtropical temperatures. They often added porches to their verandas, particularly on the southward windy side. According to oral histories recorded from descendants, the verandas were used for "almost all daily activities from preparing meals to dressing animal hides." Panna Maria, Texas, was often called a Polish colony because of its ethnic and cultural isolation from Texas, and remains an unincorporated community in Texas. The geographically isolated area continues to maintain its heritage but the population mostly moved to nearby Karnes City and Falls City.

Leopold Moczygemba, a Polish priest, founded Panna Maria by writing letters back to Poland encouraging them to emigrate to Texas, a place with free land, fertile soils, and golden mountains. About 200-300 Poles took the trip and nearly mutinied when they encountered the desolate fields and rattlesnakes of Texas. Moczygemba and his brothers served as leaders during the town's development. The settlers and their children all spoke Silesian. Resurrectionist priests led church services and religious education for children. Letters sent back to Poland demonstrate a feeling of profound new experience in America. Hunting and fishing were favorite pastimes among the settlers, who were thrilled by the freedoms of shooting wild game in the countryside. The farmers used labor-intensive agricultural techniques that maximized crop yields of corn and cotton; they sold excess cotton to nearby communities and created profitable businesses selling crops and livestock. Polish leaders and Polish historical figures settled in the community, including Matthew Pilarcyk, a Polish soldier sent to Mexico in the 1860s to fight for the Austrian Emperor Maximilian. Some records recall that he fled the Army in 1867 during the fall of the empire, escaped a firing squad and traversed the Rio Grande to enter Panna Maria, where he had heard Poles were living. When he arrived, he married a local woman and joined the community as a political leader. The community was nearly massacred following the Civil War, where the government of Texas was dismantled and gangs of cowboys and former Confederate nativists harassed and shot at Poles in Panna Maria. The Poles in Panna Maria had Union sympathies and were the subject of discrimination by the local Southerners. In 1867, a showdown between a troupe of armed cowboys and the Polish community neared a deadly confrontation; Polish priests requested the Union Army to protect them, and a stationed Army helped keep them safe, registered to vote in elections, and free from religious intolerance. The language used by these settlers was carried down to their descendants over 150 years, and the Texas Silesian dialect still exists. Cemeteries contain inscriptions written in Polish or Polish-and-English. The Silesians held a millennial celebration for the Christianization of Poland in 966, and were presented a mosaic of the Black Madonna of Częstochowa by President Lyndon B. Johnson.

==== Parisville, Michigan ====
Poles settled a farming community in Parisville, Michigan, in 1857. Historians debate whether the community was established earlier, and claims that the community originated in 1848 still exist. The community was started by five or six Polish families who came from Poland by ship in the 1850s, and lived in Detroit, Michigan in 1855 before deciding to initiate a farming community in Parisville, where they created prosperous farms, and raised cattle and horses. The lands were originally dark black swamps, and the settlers succeeded in draining the land for use as fruit orchards. As per the Swamplands Act of 1850, the lands were legally conferred to pioneering settlers who could make use of these territories. Individual Polish farmers and their families took advantage of this new law, and other immigrants settled disparate areas in interior Michigan independently. The Parisville community was surrounded by Native American Indians who continued to live in tepees during this time. The Poles and the Indians enjoyed good relations and historical anecdotes of gift-giving and resource sharing are documented. Polish farmers were dispersed throughout Michigan, and by 1903 roughly 50,000 Poles were said to live in Detroit.

Portage County, Wisconsin

The Kashubian settlement in Portage County, Wisconsin (not to be confused with the city of Portage, Wisconsin) is the United States's oldest. The first Kashubian to settle there was Michael Koziczkowski, formerly of Gdansk, who arrived in Stevens Point late in 1857. A son, Michael Junior, was born to Koziczkowski and his wife Franciszka on September 6, 1858 in Portage County. One of the first Kashubian settlements was the aptly named Polonia, Wisconsin. Within five years, more than two dozen Kashubian families joined the Koziczkowskis. Since the Portage County Kashubian community was largely agricultural, it was spread out over Sharon, Stockton, and Hull townships. After the end of the Civil War, many more immigrants from throughout occupied Poland settled in Portage County, this time including the city of Stevens Point.

==== Winona, Minnesota and Pine Creek, Wisconsin ====
Winona's first known Kashubian immigrants, the family of Jozef and Franciszka von Bronk, reached Winona in 1859. Starting in 1862, some Winona Kashubians began to settle in the farming hamlet of Pine Creek, across the Mississippi River in Trempealeau County, Wisconsin. To this day, Winona and Pine Creek (Dodge Township) remain two parts of the same community. Winona has never been a purely Kashubian settlement, as were the settlements in Wilno, Renfrew County, Ontario and the various hamlets of Portage County, Wisconsin; even so, it was known as early as 1899 as the Kashubian Capital of America, largely because of the Winona Kashubians' rapid acquisition of a social, economical and political cohesion unequaled in other Kashubian settlements. Engineer Dan Przybylski started manufacturing trenchers in the city and invented a single cylinder hydraulic extension crane. A Polish Museum of Winona was established in 1977, residing in the building of a late-19th century lumber company.

=== Immigration of Political Exiles ===
Polish political exiles, 19th Century

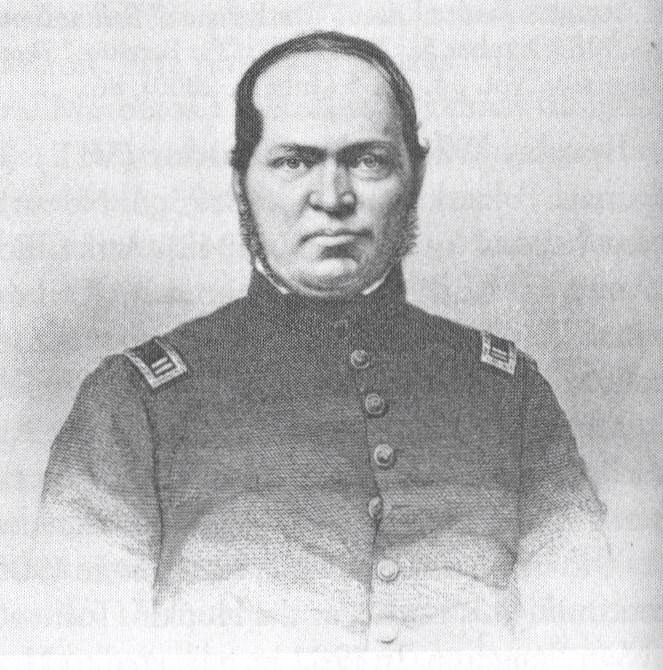
Alexander Bielaski, exiled after the 1831 uprising, he served as a military engineer and captain in the Union Army

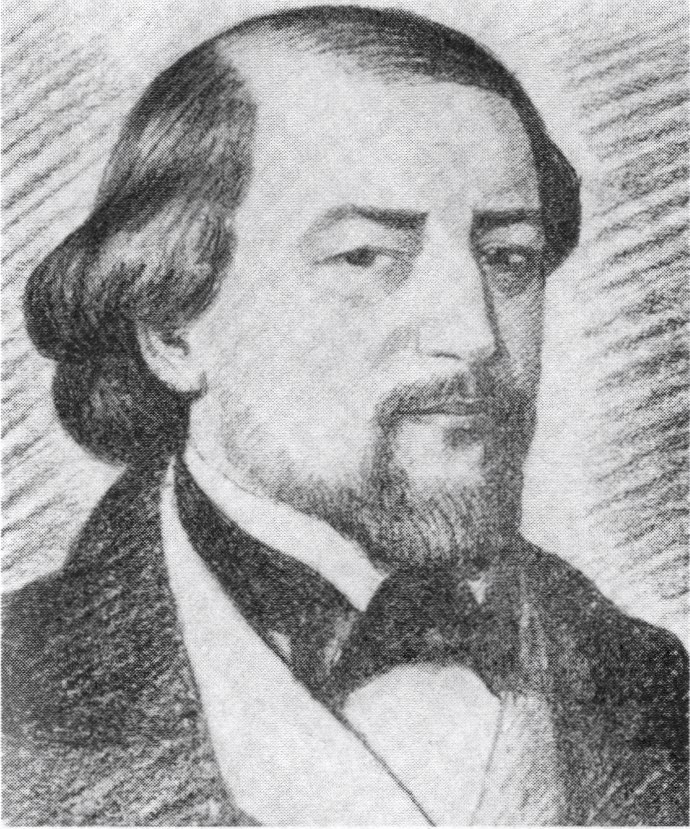
Jan Tyssowski, the Dictator of Poland during the 1846 uprising, became a Polonia activist in New York City

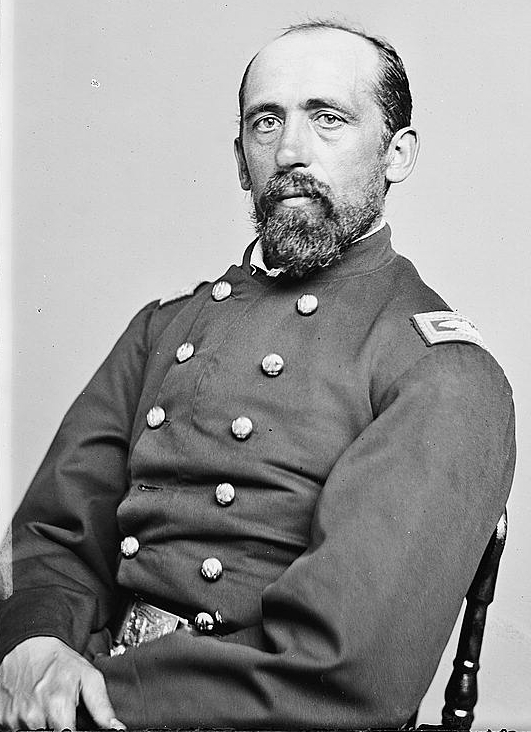
Joseph Kargé, exiled after the 1848 uprising, he once led a cavalry battle that defeated Nathan Bedford Forrest

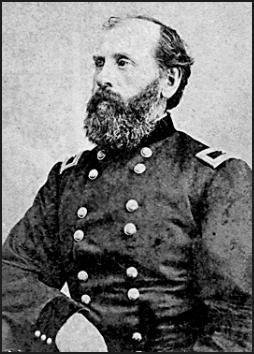
Albin Schoepf, a Pole exiled from Austria in 1848, he became a general in the Union Army.

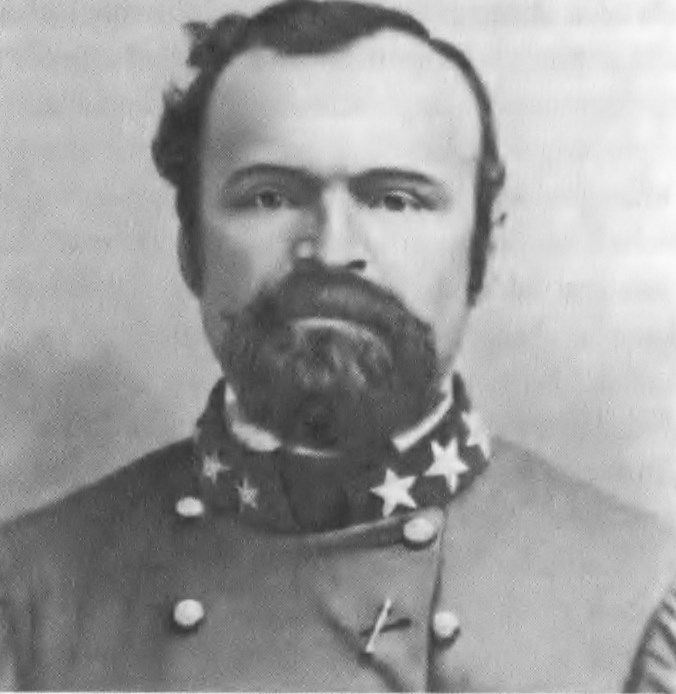
Walerian Sulakowski, exiled after the 1848 uprising, he was an organizer and officer of the Polish Brigade in New Orleans.

Many of Poland's political elites were in hiding from the Russians following an unsuccessful uprising in 1830 to 1831. Hundreds of military officers, nobles, and aristocrats were hiding as refugees in Austria, but the Emperor of Austria was under pressure to surrender them to Russia for execution. He had previously made a commitment to keep them safe from the Russians, but wanted to avoid war. The U.S. Congress and President Andrew Jackson agreed to take several hundred Polish refugees. They arrived on several small ships, the largest single arrival being 235 refugees, including August Antoni Jakubowski. Jakubowski later wrote his memoirs in English, documenting his time as a Polish exile in America. He recalled that the refugees originally wanted to go to France, but the government refused to receive them, and under obligation by the Austrian authorities, they came to America.

Jackson wrote to the Secretary of the Treasury to secure 36 sections of land within Illinois or Michigan for a Polish settlement. In 1834, a rural territory near the Rock River in Illinois was surveyed by the U.S. government. The Polish emigres formed a group, the Polish committee, to plead for aid settling in the U.S. Despite three applications to Congress by the Polish committee, no Acts were passed and no lands were ever officially appropriated for settlement. Polish immigrant Charles Kraitsir blamed Secretary of Treasury Albert Gallatin, who he said was intercepting letters addressed to the Polish Committee and took them himself, and was making statements on their behalf, without their input. Kraitsir alleged that American citizens who donated funds to their cause had their funds diverted by Gallatin. The plans were abandoned when American pioneers took the settlement lands and squatted them, leaving the Polish settlement effort politically unfeasible. No land was ever officially handed to the Polish emigres.

The Polish exiles settled in the United States. One of them was a doctor of medicine and a soldier, Felix Wierzbicki, a veteran of the November Uprising, who, in 1849, published the first English-language book printed in California, California as it is, and as it may be. The book is a description of the culture, peoples, and climate of the area at that time. According to the Library of Congress, the book was a valuable guide to California for prospective settlers that includes a survey of agriculture, hints on gold mining, a guide to San Francisco, and a chapter on California's Hispanic residents and Native American tribes.

==== Nationalist activity ====
Polish political exiles founded organizations in America, and the first association of Poles in America, Towarzystwo Polakow w Ameryce (Association of Poles in America) was founded March 20, 1842. The association's catchphrase was "To die for Poland". Some Polish intellectuals identified so strongly with Polish nationalism, that they warned repeatedly against assimilation into American culture. It was the duty of Poles to someday return to liberate the homeland, they argued to newly arrived Poles in America. The Polish National Alliance (PNA) newspaper, Zgoda, warned in 1900, "The Pole is not free to Americanize" because Poland's religion, language and nationality had been "partially torn away by the enemies". In other words, "The Pole is not free to Americanize because wherever he is – he has a mission to fulfill." The poet Teofila Samolinska, known as the "mother of the Polish National Alliance," tried to bridge the gap between the political exiles of the 1860s and the waves of peasants arriving late in the century. She wrote:

Here one is free to fight for the Fatherland;
Here the cruelty of tyrants will not reach us,
Here the scars inflicted on us will fade.

— translation of "Do rodaków" published in Orzeł Polski (1870).

Many of the exiles in America were actively political and saw their mission in the United States as one to create a new Poland in the United States. Some rejected the term "exile" and considered themselves "pilgrims", following the Polish messianism message of Adam Mickiewicz. The political exiles created nationalist clubs and spread news about the oppression in partitioned Poland. A Polish Central Committee founded in New York in 1863 attempted to rally American public opinion for Polish independence and fund-raised to support the revolutionaries. The American public opinion was not swayed by the small group, in large part because the Civil War was ongoing at the time and little care was taken for a foreign war. Russia, being strongly pro-Union, was also considered an ally to many Northerners, and Poland's uprising was mistaken by some Americans as just another secessionist movement.

Future Polish immigrants referred to this group, who arrived in the United States before 1870 as the stara emigracja (old emigration), and differentiated them from the nowa emigracja (new emigration) who came from 1870 to 1920.

=== American Civil War ===
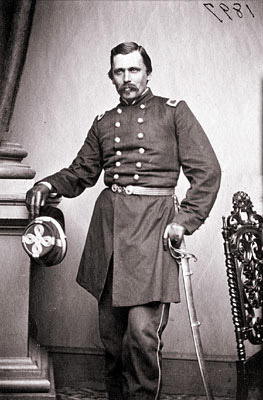
Colonel Krzyzanowski, who fought in the 1848 uprising, served as a Union general in the American Civil War

Polish Americans fought in the American Civil War on both sides. The majority were Union soldiers, owing to geography and ideological sympathies with the abolitionists. An estimated 5,000 Polish Americans served in the Union, and 1,000 for the Confederacy. By coincidence, the first soldiers killed in the American Civil War were both Polish: Captain Constantin Blandowski, a Union battalion commander in Missouri who died in the Camp Jackson Affair, and Thaddeus Strawinski, an 18-year-old Confederate who was accidentally shot at Fort Moultrie on Sullivan's Island. Two Polish immigrants achieved leadership positions in the Union Army, Colonels Joseph Kargé and Włodzimierz Krzyżanowski. (Note: Kargé and Krzyżanowski were brevetted brigadier generals in the United States Volunteers. According to Ingram & Asher (2009, p. 23), Krzyżanowski "was said to have been denied a promotion because members of Congress could not pronounce or spell his name.") Kargé commanded the 2nd New Jersey Volunteer Cavalry Regiment that defeated Confederate Nathan Bedford Forrest in a battle. Krzyżanowski first commanded the mostly immigrant 58th New York Volunteer Infantry Regiment, nicknamed the Polish Legion, in which Poles and other immigrants fought battles in the Eastern Theater and Western Theater of the American Civil War. Krzyżanowski later commanded an infantry brigade, from 1862 to 1864, with the 58th in that formation.

In 1863–1864, the Imperial Russian Army suppressed the January Uprising, a large scale insurrection in the Russian partition of the former territories of the Polish–Lithuanian Commonwealth. Many Polish resistance fighters fled the country, and Confederate agents tried and failed to encourage them to immigrate and join the military of the Confederate States of America.

=== Post-Civil War ===
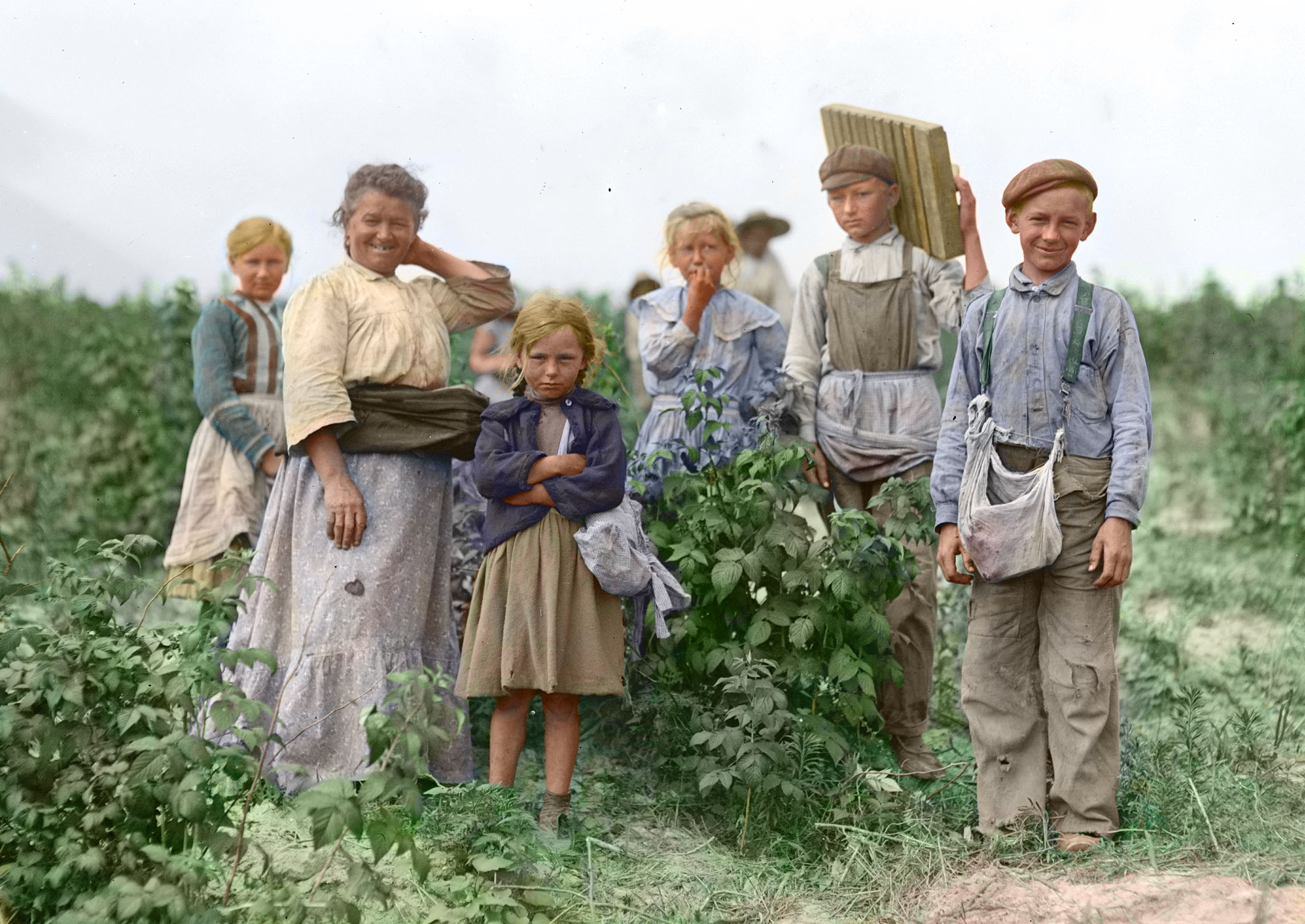
Polish immigrants working on the farm in Maryland, 1909.

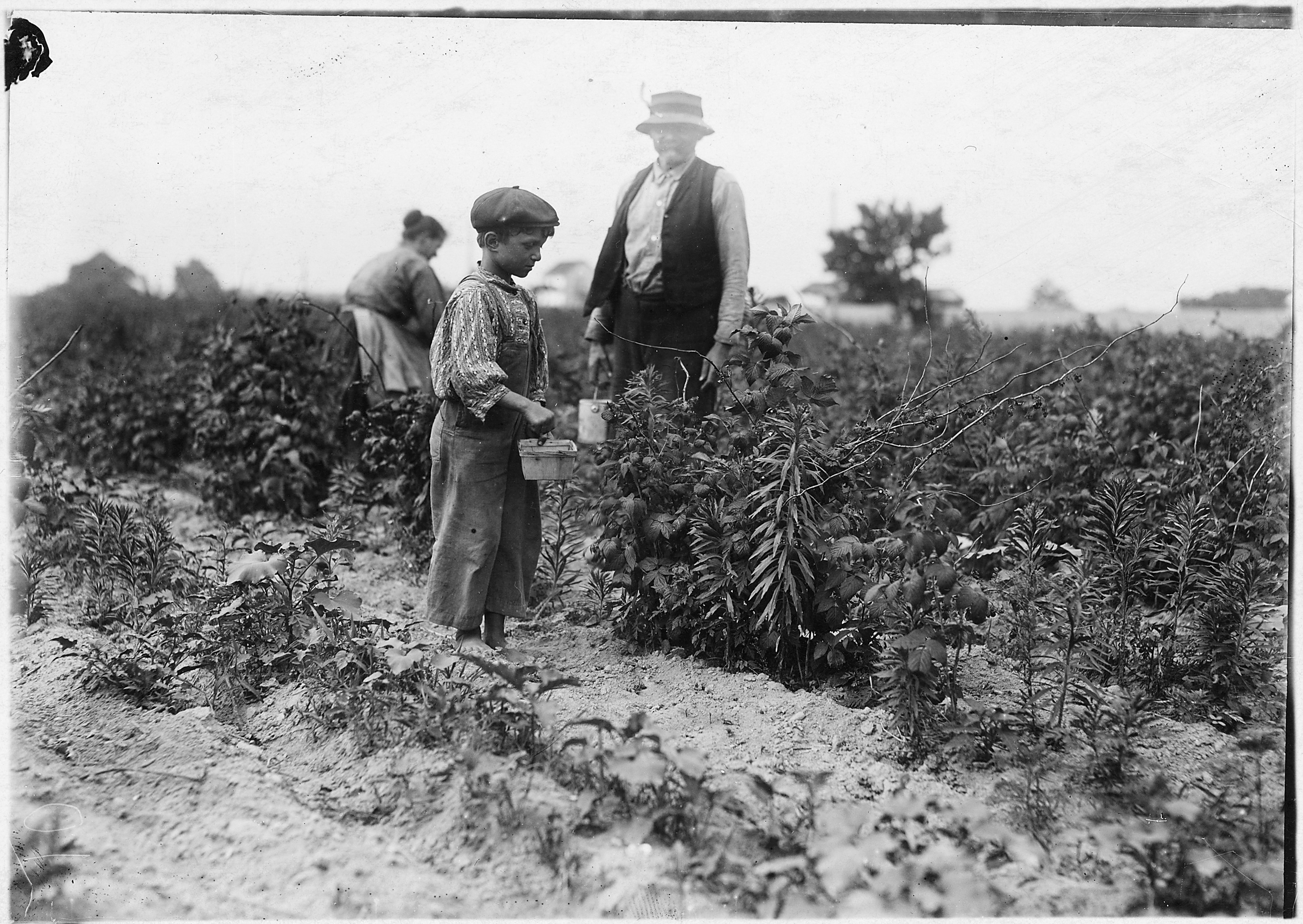
Young Polish boy Johnnie Yellow, picking berries in Maryland. He is in a family of agricultural migrants who work in oyster farming on the Gulf of Mexico during the winter. His growth is stunted and he measures only 39 in (99 cm) tall at 10 years old.

After the collapse of the Confederacy, Polish foreign labor was desired to work on Southern farms as replacements for black slaves. Several such societies were founded in Texas, largely by private planters, but in 1871, Texas funded immigration of Europeans through direct state aid (Texas Bureau of Immigration). The Waverly Emigration Society, formed in 1867 in Walker County, Texas, by several planters, dispatched Meyer Levy, a Polish Jew, to Poland to acquire roughly 150 Poles to pick cotton. He sailed to Poland and brought back farm laborers, who arrived in New Waverly, Texas, in May 1867. The agreement that Poles had with the plantation owners was that the farmers would be paid $90 (equivalent to $2,073 in 2025), $100 ($2304), and $110 ($2534) per year for three years of their labor, while the owners provided them with a "comfortable cabin" and food. Poles paid back their owners for the ship tickets to America, often in installments. By 1900, after years working on Southerners' farms, Poles had "bought almost all the farmland" in New Waverly, and were expanding their land ownership to the surrounding areas. New Waverly served as a mother colony for future Polish immigrants to the United States, as many arriving Poles lived and worked there before moving on to other Polonias in the U.S. Polish farmers commonly worked directly with southern blacks in east Texas, and they were commonly in direct competition for agricultural jobs. Blacks frequently picked up a few words of Polish and Poles picked up some of the black English dialect in these areas during the late 19th century. R. L. Daniels in Lippincott's Monthly Magazine wrote a piece on "Polanders" in Texas in 1888, praising their industriousness and hard work ethic. He cited instances where Polish farmers called their landlords massa, denoting a subordinate position on level with slavery, and, when asking a woman why she left Poland, she replied 'Mudder haf much childs and 'Nough not to eat all". Daniels found that Poles were efficient farmers, and planted corn and cotton so close to their homes as not to leave even elbow room to the nearby buildings. Texas blacks, referred to Silesians as "'dem white niggahs' whom they hold in undisguised contempt" were apparently stunned by their high literacy rates, according to Daniels.

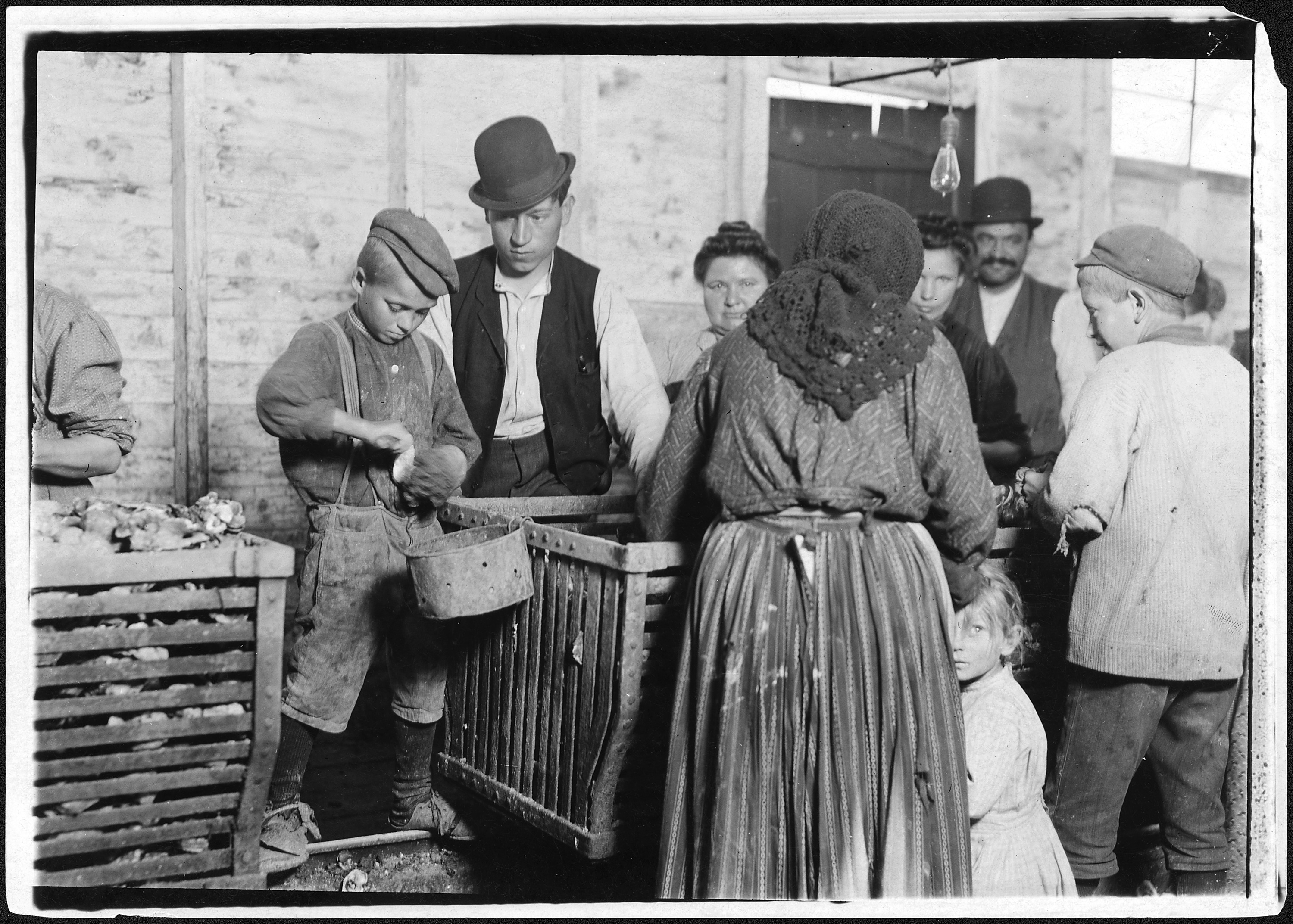
9 year old worker Johnnie shucking oysters. Behind him is the foreman, who recruited the workers from Baltimore, Maryland.

Polish immigrants came in high numbers to Baltimore, Maryland, following the Civil War and created an ethnic community in Fells Point. They worked on farms in Maryland and many became migrant farming families. Oyster companies from the Gulf of Mexico hired recruiters to hire Polish farmers for work in the oyster farming industry. Jobs were advertised with illustrations of a green, tropical environment and wages in 1909 were promised at 15 cents per hour (equivalent to $5.37 in 2025) for men and 12.5 cents per hour ($4.48) for women. Polish farmers in Baltimore, Maryland and in the southern United States commonly came to Louisiana and Mississippi during the winter months. Those that came were provided very small, cramped living quarters and only one worker per family was given a permanent job canning oysters. These were paid 12 cents per hour ($4.3) for men and 8 cents per hour ($2.87) for women. Companies paid the rest to shell oysters and paid them 5 cents ($1.79) per measure; according to a worker, a measure should weigh about 4.5 lb (2.0 kg) but usually weighed more than 7–8 lb (3.2–3.6 kg). Jobs were segregated by gender; women and children worked in the oyster house while men and boys fished on the boats.

"Men depart by boat to the water where they stay one to two weeks. Because oysters are scarce, the net yields at best fifteen percent of the expected catch when pulled up to the deck. The rest are shells and slime. This work is hard beyond words. A person not used to cranking up the net gives up from exhaustion.

If fog appears during the catch, the oysters open up and most of them die when the sun starts shining. In such cases it becomes the worker's loss.

You also have the oyster workers who return with a cargo of a few hundred barrels. Then the calculation starts, forty cents for a barrel of oysters. From the price the company takes a share to cover the costs of the boat, tools, and captain's pay. One-third is divided among those who caught the oysters. In exceptional cases one gets ten to twelve dollars for a hard week's work, most often though it is five to seven dollars."

— Stefan Nesterowicz, Travel Notes (Notatki z podrozy), Travel Notes, 1910.

Polish foremen were used to manage and supervise the workers. many immigrants did not speak English and were wholly dependent on their foreman to communicate to the company. Photographer Lewis Hine spoke with one foreman, who recruited Poles from Baltimore, who said, "I tell you, I have to lie to employees. They're never satisfied. Hard work to get them." The foremen were allowed to beat their workers and functioned as pimps in some cases. Nesterowicz found some foremen convinced attractive women to sleep with their American bosses in exchange for higher-paying positions. The moral degradation and exploitation in the oyster farms led a local Polish priest, Father Helinski, to ask Polish organizations to dissuade any more Poles from entering the business.

== 1870–1914 ==
=== Wave of Polish immigration ===
The largest wave of Polish immigration to America occurred in the years after the American Civil War until World War I. Polish immigration began en masse from Prussia in 1870 following the Franco-Prussian War. Prussia retaliated against Polish support for France with increasing Germanization following the war. This wave of immigrants are referred to as za chlebem (for bread) immigrants because they were primarily peasants facing starvation and poverty in occupied Poland. A study by the U.S. Immigration Commission found that in 1911, 98.8% of Polish immigrants to the United States said that they would be joining relatives or friends, leading to conclusions that letters sent back home played a major role in promoting immigration. They arrived first from the German Polish partition, and then from the Russian partition and Austrian partition. U.S. restrictions on European immigration during the 1920s and the general chaos of World War I cut off immigration significantly until World War II. Estimates for the large wave of Polish immigrants from about 1870s to 1920s are given at about 1.5 million. In addition, many Polish immigrants arrived at the port of Baltimore. The actual numbers of ethnically Polish arrivals at that time is difficult to estimate due to prolonged occupation of Poland by neighboring states, with total loss of its international status. Similar circumstances developed in the following decades: during the Nazi German occupation of Poland in World War II; and further, in the communist period, under the Soviet military and political dominance with re-drawn national borders. During the Partitions of Polish–Lithuanian Commonwealth (1795–1918), the Polish nation was forced to define itself as a disjointed and oppressed minority, within three neighboring empires, in the Austrian Partition, Prussian Partition, and Russian Partition. The Polish diaspora in the United States, however, was founded on a unified national culture and society. Consequently, it assumed the place and moral role of the fourth province.

==== Background ====
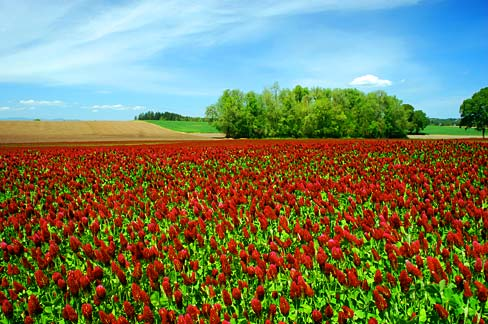
A field planted with crimson clover to enrich farm soil. The use of clover tripled Polish farm output and increased productivity of cattle in the late 19th century.

Poland was largely an agrarian society throughout the Middle Ages and into the 19th century. Polish farmers were mostly peasants, ruled by Polish nobility that owned their land and restricted their political and economic freedoms. Peasants were disallowed from trading, and typically would have to sell their livestock to the nobility, who in turn would function as middlemen in economic life. Commercial farming did not exist, and frequent uprisings by the peasants were suppressed harshly, both by the nobility and the foreign powers occupying Poland. A number of agricultural reforms were introduced in the mid-19th century to Poland, first in German Poland, and later eastern parts of the country. The agricultural technologies originated in Britain and were carried eastward by conversing traders and merchants; Poland gained these secrets in the most developed regions first, and through successful implementation, areas that adopted them boomed. The introduction of a four-crop rotation system tripled the output of Poland's farmlands and created a surplus of agricultural labor in Poland. Prior to this, Polish peasants continued Medieval Era practice of three field rotation, losing one year of productive growing time to replenish soil nutrients. Instead of leaving a field fallow, or without any plants for a season, the introduction of turnips and especially red clover allowed Polish fields to maximize nutrients by green manure. Red clover was especially popular because it fed cattle as grazing land, giving the extra benefit of more robust livestock raising in Poland.

Between 1870 and 1914, more than 3.6 million people departed from Polish territories (of whom 2.6 million arrived in the U.S.) Serfdom was abolished in Prussia in 1808, in the Austria-Hungary in 1848 and in the Russian Empire, in 1861. In the late 19th century, the beginnings of industrialization, commercial agriculture and a population boom, that exhausted available land, transformed Polish peasant-farmers into migrant-laborers. Racial discrimination and unemployment drove them to emigrate.

===== Partitions =====
====== German ======
The first group of Poles to emigrate to the United States were those in German-occupied Poland. The German territories advanced their agricultural technologies in 1849, creating a surplus of agricultural labor, first in Silesia, then in eastern Prussian territories. The rise in agricultural yields created the unintended effect of boosting the Polish population, as infant mortality and starvation decreased, increasing the Polish birth rate. In 1886, Otto von Bismarck gave a speech to the Lower House of the Prussian Parliament defending his policies of anti-polonism, and warning of the ominous position Silesia was in with over 1 million Poles who could fight Germany "within twenty four hour notice". Citing the November Uprising of 1830–31, Bismarck introduced measures to limit freedoms of press and political representation that Poles enjoyed within the Empire. Bismarck forced the deportation of an estimated 30,000–40,000 Poles out of German territory in 1885, with a five-year ban on any Polish immigration back into Germany. Many Poles did return in 1890, when the ban was lifted, but others left for the United States during this time. Bismarck's anti-Catholic Kulturkampf policies aimed at Polish Catholics increased political unrest and interrupted Polish life, also causing emigration. Around 152,000 Poles left for United States during the Kulturkampf.

====== Russian ======
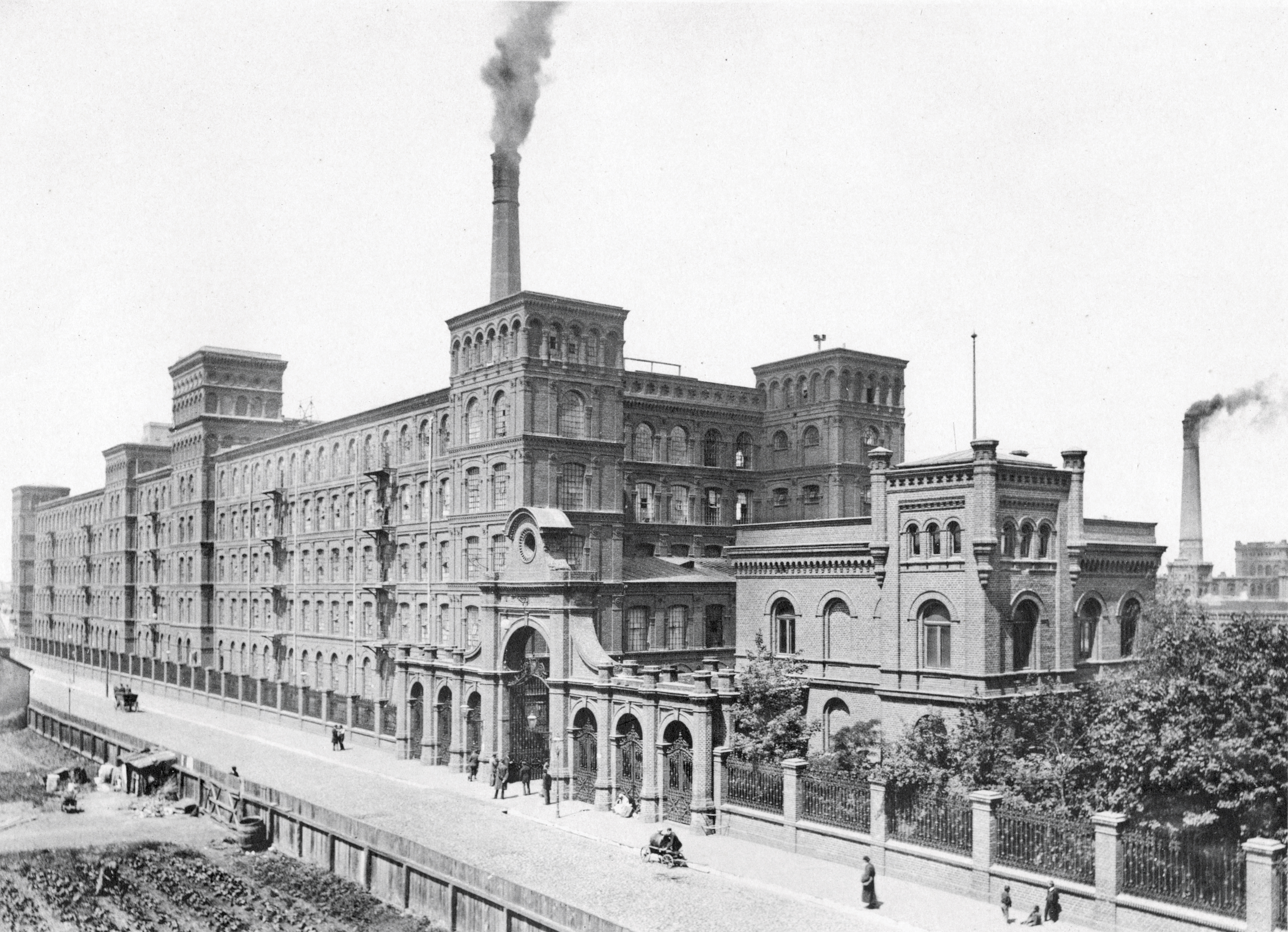
The Poznanski Factory, Łódź (1895), was a spinning factory key to the Polish textile industry. Thousands of Poles worked and resided in living quarters at the location.

The Russian partition of Poland experienced considerable industrialization, particularly the textile capital of Łódź, then the Manchester of Imperial Russia. Russia's policies were pro-foreign immigration, whereas German Poland was unambiguously anti-immigrant. Polish laborers were encouraged to migrate for work in the iron-foundries of Piotrków Trybunalski and migrants were highly desired in Siberian towns. Russia also established a Peasant Bank to promote land ownership for its peasant population, and many Poles were given employment opportunities pulling them from rural areas into industrial Russian cities. Of the three partitions, the Russian one contained the most middle-class Polish workers, and the number of industrial workers overall between 1864 and 1890 increased from 80,000 to 150,000. Łódź experienced a booming economy, as the Russian Empire consumed about 70% of its textile production.

Russian-occupied Poles experienced increasingly abusive Russification in the mid-19th century. From 1864 onward, all education was mandated to be in Russian, and private education in Polish was illegal. Polish newspapers, periodicals, books, and theater plays were permitted, but were frequently censored by the authorities. All high school students were required to pass national exams in Russian; young men who failed these exams were forced into the Russian Army. In 1890, Russia introduced tariffs to protect the Russian textile industry, which began a period of economic decline and neglect towards Poland. The decline of Russia's economy after the Russo-Japanese War and the 1905 Russian Revolution further pushed Polish emigration. Polish nationalists at first discouraged emigration. In many respects, the nationalists were succeeding, creating secret Polish language schools so children could learn Polish, and leading insurrectionist activity against the Russian occupiers. However, when emigrants in the United States began sending back money to their poor relatives in Russia and Galicia, attitudes against emigration subsided. Polish National Party leader Roman Dmowski saw emigration in a positive light, as an "improvement of the fortunes of the masses who are leaving Europe." At its peak, in 1912–1913, annual emigration to the U.S., from the Polish provinces of the Russian Empire, exceeded 112,345 (including large numbers of Jews, Lithuanians and Belarusians).

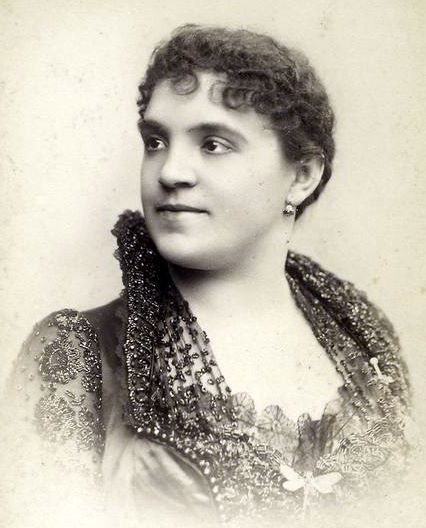
Photograph of Sembrich, who sang at the Metropolitan Opera. She wore traditional Polish dresses at her concerts.

Among the most famous immigrants from partitioned Poland at this time was Marcella Sembrich. She had performed in Poland as an opera singer and moved to the United States. When sharing her experience with the Kansas City Journal, she described the social discrimination affecting her in what was then The Kingdom of Poland, a puppet state of Russia:

"...children who speak Polish on the streets of Vilna are punished and performances of any kind in the Polish language are forbidden. Polish is not allowed anywhere, and the police are still as strict as ever in trying to prevent its use. The first night I sang at Vilna I was wild to sing in Polish. I spoke to the manager about it and he implored me on his knees not to think of such a thing. But I was determined to do it if I could, so at the end of the performance, when the audience kept demanding encores, I prepared for it by singing a song in Russian. Then I sang one of Chopin's songs in Polish.

When I finished there was a moment of absolute stillness. Then came such an outburst as I have never seen in my life. I seized my husband's arm and stood waiting to see...

...I had to sign a paper saying that I would never sing in Polish again in Vilna, and at my second concert I left out the Chopin songs. Every year I have come to Vilna and every time the chief of police comes to me with the same paper to sign, and every time I have to sign the promise that I will not sing in Polish."

— Marcella Sembrich, On Learning to Sing, On Learning to Sing, Kansas City Journal, Oct. 22, 1899.

====== Austrian ======
Polish children in Austrian Galicia were largely uneducated; by 1900, 52 percent of all male and 59 percent of all female Galicians over six years of age were illiterates. Austrian Poles started immigrating from the United States beginning in 1880. The Austrian government tightened emigration in the late 1800s, as many young Polish males were eager to leave the mandatory conscription of the Austrian government, and peasants were displeased with the lack of upward opportunities and stability from heavy, labor-intensive agricultural work. The Galician government wanted to tie peasants to contracts and legal obligations to the land they worked on, and tried to enforce legislation to keep them on the lands. Polish peasant revolts in 1902 and 1903 changed the Austrian government's policies, and emigration from Galicia increased tremendously in the early 1900–1910 period.

Galician Poles experienced among the most difficult situations in their homeland. When serfdom was outlawed in 1848, the Austrian government continued to drive a wedge between Polish peasants and their Polish landlords to detract them from a more ambitious Polish uprising. Galicia was isolated from the west geographically by the Vistula river and politically by the foreign powers, leaving Galician Poles restricted from commercial agriculture in the west of Poland. Galician Poles continued to use outdated agricultural techniques such as burning manure for fuel instead of using it for fertilizer, and the antiquated Medieval-era three-year crop rotation system, which had been long-replaced in western Poland by the use of clover as a fodder crop. Galician Poles resented the government for its apathy in handling disease; a typhus epidemic claimed 400,000 lives between 1847 and 1849, and cholera killed over 100,000 in the 1850s. Galicia suffered a potato blight between 1847 and 1849, similar to Ireland's famine at the same time, but relief was never reached because of political and geographical isolation. A railroad system connecting Poland began reaching West Galicia from 1860 to 1900, and railroad tickets cost roughly half a farmhand's salary at the time. Polish peasants were no longer the property of their landlords, but remained tied to their plots of land for subsistence and were financially indebted to the landlords and government taxmen. The plight of the Galician Poles was termed the "Galician misery", as many were deeply frustrated and depressed by their situations.

Austrian Poles experienced an enormous rise in religiosity during the late 19th century. From 1875 to 1914, the number of Polish nuns increased sixfold in Galicia; at the same time, German Poland had a less marked increase and in Russian Poland it decreased. Historian William Galush noted that many nuns were from the peasant class, and young women choosing marriage were faced with the prospect of hard farm work. Polish peasants in Galicia were forced to work harder on smaller size farms than those they had grown up on as a result of Poland's rapid population growth.

==== Fields of work ====
A 'Want Ad' dated July 15, 1909 for positions in the U.S. Steel Corporation. It reads To Work in Open Shops. Syrians, Poles, and Romanians Preferred.

Polish immigrants were highly desired by American employers for low-level positions. In steel mills and tin mills, it was observed that foremen, even when given the choice to directly employ workers of their own ethnic background, still desired to choose Poles. Steel work was undesirable to other immigrant groups, as it lasted 12 hours a day and 7 days a week, self-selecting for the most industrious and hardworking people. Polish immigrants chose to chain-market the job positions to their friends and relatives, and it was very common for a Polish friend with good English to negotiate wage rates for newer immigrants. Polish Americans favored steel areas and mining camps, which had a high demand for manual labor; favorite destinations included Chicago, Detroit, Milwaukee, Cleveland, Buffalo, New York, and Pittsburgh, as well as smaller industrial cities and mining towns. Relatively few went to New England or to farming areas; almost none went to the South. Poles came to dominate certain fields of work: in 1920, 33.1% of all U.S. coal-mine operatives and 25.2% of all blast furnace laborers were Polish. Polish immigrants were categorized for low-status positions within U.S. companies, as the same steel companies that recruited Polish immigrants for work in blast furnaces recruited Irish immigrants for work with finished metal.

===== Blast Furnaces =====
Polish immigrants took low-paying jobs at blast furnaces in high numbers. As in many jobs Poles took in America, the demand fluctuated, hours were long, and the supply of expendable labor was high. Industrialist Amasa Stone actively sought out Polish immigrants to work in his steel mill in Ohio, and personally traveled to Poland in the 1870s to advertise laborer opportunities. He advertised jobs in Gdansk, promising jobs for laborers at a salary of $7.25 a week (the average wage at his mill was $11.75 for Americans), and a free ship ride to the United States. Hundreds of Poles took those jobs and the Polish population of Cleveland grew from 2,848 to 8,592 between 1880 and 1890 as a result of his recruiting. In 1910, 88% of workers labored for an 84-hour weekly shift (7 days, 12 hours per day). Day and night shifts rotated every two weeks, requiring men to perform 18- or 24-hour straight shifts. Movements to end the 7 day week were pushed by management, but many workers did not oppose the practice and saw it as a necessary evil. The United States Steel Corporation slowly eliminated its 7-day work weeks, down from 30% in 1910 to 15% in 1912. Polish American families grew up fatherless in Chicago, and the long hours spent at the blast furnaces only averaged 17.16 cents per hour (equivalent to $5.72 in 2025), below the poverty limit at the time in Chicago. Workers at the blast furnaces had little time for self-improvement, leisure, or many social activities. When the 7-day week was done away with, some workers saw it as a waste of time because their children were in school and their friends were at work, so they spent time at saloons and drank. Many plants found that a large number of workers quit their jobs when Sunday was taken off their schedules, citing the day off as a reason.

===== Mining =====
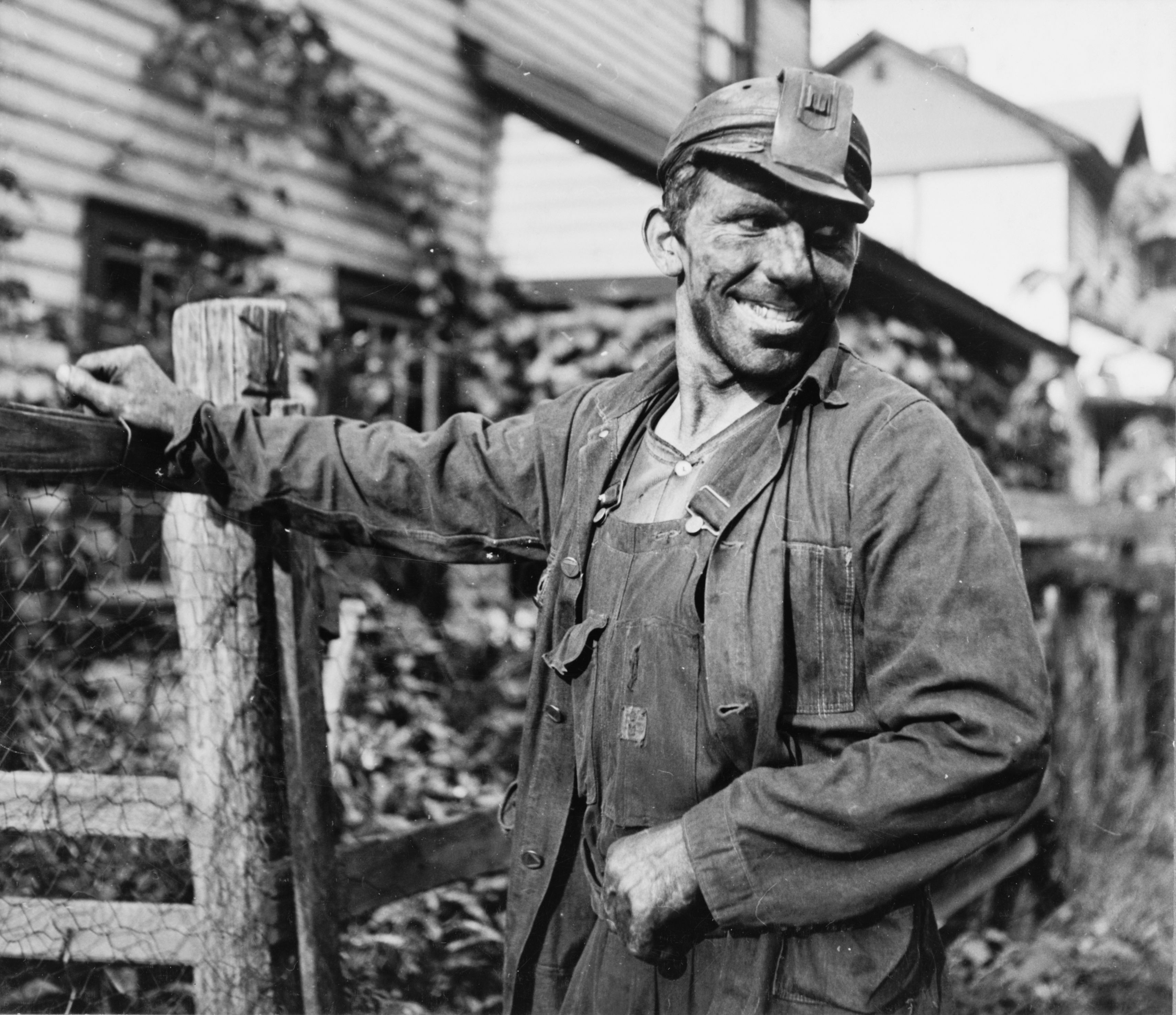
A Polish American coal miner in Capels, West Virginia, 1938.

West Virginia experienced an influx of immigrant coal miners during the early 20th century, increasing the number of Poles in West Virginia to almost 15,000 by 1930. Poles were the third-largest immigrant group in West Virginia, following the Italians and the Hungarians, who also joined the mining industry in large numbers. Poles also came to Colorado for coal mining in small but significant numbers.

Poles often worked alongside other Slavic immigrants, and recorded work safety signs from the mines in the 1930s were commonly posted in Polish, Lithuanian, Czech, and Hungarian languages.

Poles predominated certain communities, comprising the largest ethnic group in 5 towns by 1908: Raleigh in Raleigh County, Scotts Run in Monongalia County, and Whipple and Carlisle in Fayette County. Pennsylvania attracted the greatest number of Polish miners. Polish immigration to Luzerne County was popular from the end of the Civil War. Employment in the mining industry increased from 35,000 in 1870 to over 180,000 in 1914. According to historian Brian McCook, over 80% of Poles in northern Pennsylvania were laborers in the coal mines prior to World War I. Northern Pennsylvania contains over 99% of America's anthracite coal, which was favored for home heating during the colder months. Demand for the coal was seasonal and left many workers unemployed for 3 to 4 months each summer. Poles joined ethnic and Catholic insurance programs with fellow workers, pooling funds together for medical and disability insurance.

In 1903 a Polish-language newspaper, Gornik, later Gornik Pensylwanski (Pennsylvanian Miner), was started in Wilkes-Barre to share local industry news.

A Pennsylvania State Investigating Committee in 1897 found the workers' salaries to be severely low, stating it was "utterly impossible for any moderate sized family to more than exist, let alone enjoy the comforts which every American workingman desires and deserves." In Pennsylvania, miners averaged $521.41 ($18684) per year, and historians have calculated that $460 ($16483) would allow basic survival in northern Pennsylvania. In 1904 Frank Julian Warne claimed that a Slavic miner could have a monthly salary of $30 ($1075) and still send a $20 ($717) remittance monthly to Poland. He found Slavic miners lived together, 14 unmarried men in an apartment, buying food collectively, required only $4 ($143.33) a month for living expenses and $5 to $12 ($179.17–430) each on rent. In 1915, Coal Age magazine estimated that $10 million ($358 million) was sent back to Poland annually from Polish miners. Warne accused the Slavs of depressing wages and effectively "attacking and retarding communal advancement" by the United Mine Workers. Miners had to purchase their own working supplies, and company management enforced requirements that the equipment and blasting powder be purchased from the company store, at prices exceeding 30% over retail. Warne argued that Slavs did not feel the financial burden of increasing material supplies because of their lower standard-of-living, weakening their support for the United Mine Worker strikes. Laws were pushed by the United Mine Workers to limit Polish competition; the Pennsylvania Legislature passed a law in 1897 mandating that a worker perform as a laborer for at least two years and pass an examination in English to receive a promotion. Polish miners joined the United Mine Workers and joined in strikes during the turn of the twentieth century, bridging past nativist concerns. Descendants of the Polish miners still exist in the northern industrial areas of West Virginia, and many have dispersed across the U.S. Polish immigrants were favored for mining, where hundreds died each year, because they "played their part with a devotion, amenability, and steadiness not excelled by men of the old immigration." A novel set in 1901 written from the perspective of a young Polish American in a coal mining family, Theodore Roosevelt by Jennifer Armstrong, reflects the poor conditions and labor struggles affecting the miners. A Coal Miner's Bride: the Diary of Anetka Kaminska by Susan Campbell Bartoletti is written from the perspective of a 13-year-old Polish girl who is transported to the U.S. to marry a coal miner in Pennsylvania. In a 1909 novel by Stanisław Osada, Z pennsylwańskiego piekła (From a Pennsylvania Hell), a Polish miner is seduced and subverted by an Irish-American girl who tears him from his immigrant community and possesses him in a lustful relationship. Historian Karen Majewski identifies this novel as one which depicts an Americanized Pole, "seduced and demoralized by this country's materialism and lack of regulation."

===== Meatpacking =====
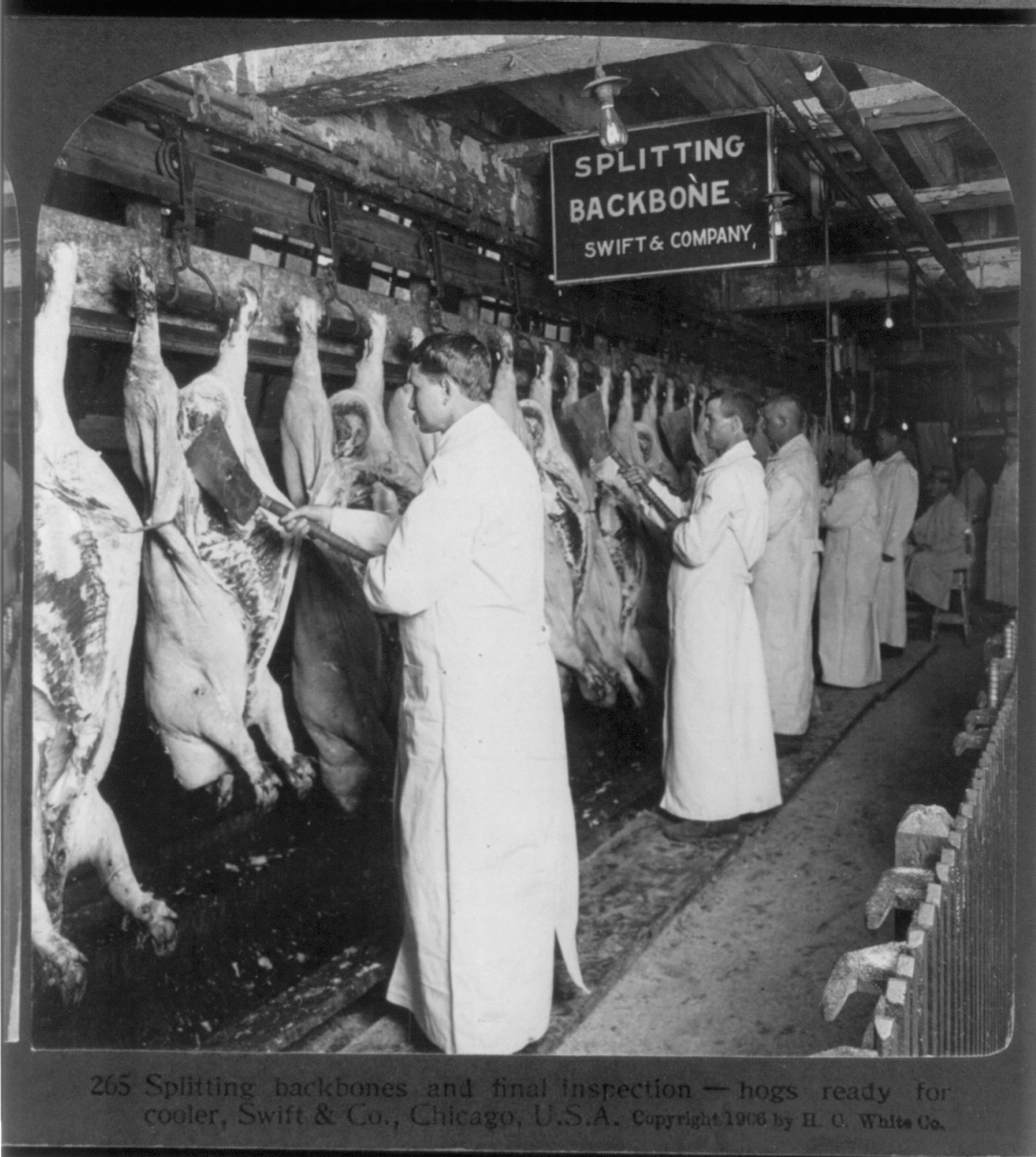
Meatpackers inspecting pork, 1908. Poles were the most numerous ethnic group in Chicago's Union Stockyards during the early 20th century.

Meatpacking was dominated by Polish immigrants in the Midwestern United States during the late 19th century until World War II.

The meatpacking industry was a large industry in Chicago in the 1880s. Although some had joined earlier, a large number of Poles joined Chicago's packing plants in 1886, and through networking and successive generations, Poles predominated the profession. Historian Dominic Pacyga identifies the Polish influx of workers in 1886 as a result of the failed strike by the mainly German and Irish workers that year. The union was further weakened by yellow dog contracts forced on returning workers, and by the supply of cheap Polish labor.

Workers, including the new Polish arrivals, were introduced to the industry usually at the crack of dawn outside one of the packing plants. Crowds of hundreds and sometimes thousands of laborers, mostly unskilled, gathered near the various employment offices. They appeared every morning at around six o'clock and waited for about an hour. The employment agent walked among the crowd and picked those who seemed the strongest and best able to do unskilled work at the plant. The agent did not allow any bargaining over wages or hours; he simply tapped the men he had chosen on the back and said: "Come along!" Generally, the agent only picked a few. The rest of the group would be back the next day.

Job security in the Chicago plants was highly uncommon. Since the livestock supplies were seasonal, particularly cattle, management laid off its unskilled workers in the killing department each year. Workers, including Poles, sometimes paid management kickbacks to secure employment at the company. The meatpacking industry increased its production process tremendously in the late 19th century, but its wages fell. "In 1884 five cattle splitters in a gang would process 800 head of cattle in ten hours, or 16 cattle per man per hour at an hourly wage of 45 cents. By 1894, four splitters were getting out 1,200 cattle in ten hours, or 30 cattle per man per hour. This was an increase of nearly 100 percent in 10 years, yet the wage rate fell to 40 cents per hour."

===== Child labor =====
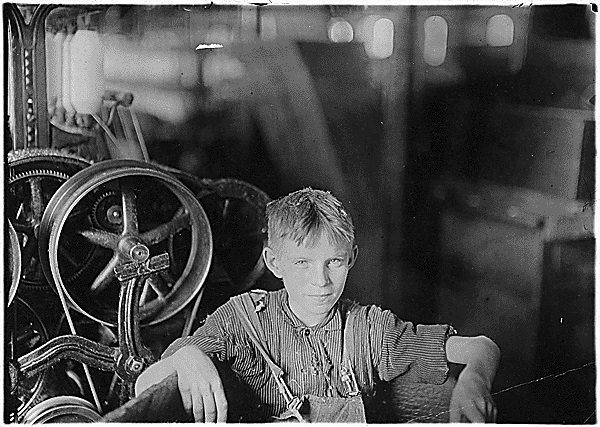
Polish boy sitting at his workstation in Anthony, Rhode Island, 1909. He was a spinner at a textile mill.

In 1895 government inspectors found a child working at a dangerous machine. The child told inspectors that his father was injured at the machine and would lose his job if his son did not work. Illinois labor inspectors needed Polish translators to collect evidence because some child workers, in 1896, were unable to answer questions, like "What is your name?" and "Where do you live?", in English. Reports also found that parents falsified child birth records to bypass laws prohibiting work for children under 14 years old. Under investigations with the children themselves, it was found that work commonly started at age 10 or 11. School records certifying that children could read and write by age 16 were easily obtained by Catholic parish schools after confirmation. Because of vigorous State prosecution against factories, from 1900 to 1914 the number of children under 16 working in urban Illinois fell from 8,543 to 4,264.

===== Farming =====
When a Polish immigrant, usually a farmer, goes to a factory, he does not speak the local language and is like a dumb person. Unacquainted with a job he is attempting to do, he is treated as unskilled and paid very little. He does not have much means and lives very modestly any way he can. Well-established Americans consider him a lowlife.
How different is the treatment of the same newcomer who wants to work on a farm. The native, indigenous person is more modest in his own life. He desires and knows well from his personal experience that beginnings are difficult. When a newcomer lives at first in a quickly-built shack and sleeps on a few boards put together, it is taken as a natural stage, nothing by which to be disgusted. When the same American sees how our peasant takes a plow into his hands, how he gets horses to move, how row after row of soil is beautifully plowed, instead of contempt, he feels respect toward our men.

— Stefan Nesterowicz, Travel Notes p. 134

Poles arriving in America frequently had years of experience working in agriculture and gained a reputation as skilled farmers in the United States. Polish immigrants traveled to the Northern United States intentionally with hopes of working in industrial trades. Stereotypes casting them as "farm people" and economic necessities in many cases predetermined their careers, which continued them in agricultural roles. Polish immigrants to Massachusetts and Connecticut came seeking jobs in New England's mills, but the local American population in Connecticut River Valley was actively seeking those jobs and effectively opened agricultural opportunities for them. In New England, Poles came and used land that had been abandoned by Yankee farmers. Poles had even higher crop yields than the local Americans because of their labor-intensive efforts and willingness to try lands previously disregarded as worthless. Poles succeeded rapidly; in Northampton in 1905, Poles were 4.9% of the population and owned 5.2% of the farmland. By 1930, they made up 7.1% of the town and owned 89.2% of the farmland. The Polish farmers' success is due to their large families, where children helped in agriculture, and their long hours of work, as many spent hours clearing abandoned land after a full day's work. Louis Adamic in A Nation of Nations wrote that Poles "restored hundreds of thousands of apparently hopeless acres to productivity". Lenders viewed Polish immigrants as low credit risks because of their thrift, work ethic, and honesty. Polish immigrants were said to embody "immigrant Puritanism", demonstrating economic puritanism better than the original New Englanders. Author Elizabeth Stearns Tyler in 1909 found that Polish children attending American schools did on par or better than the American-born, yet most went back to farming after high school, continuing a self-fulfilling prophecy:

"Since the economic value of the Pole for us is through the tilling of our farms, it is fortunate that the Pole himself likes the farm and shows himself ready to fall in with the plans already made for him. We do not want him to go to the city, nor to enter a profession, but we want him to buy up the deserted farms." Elizabeth Stearns Tyler, 1909.

Poles were seen as industrious, hardworking, and productive, while paradoxically lacking in ambition. They had created ethnic communities in farming that were stable and successful, and did not venture out into larger professions. Polish Americans eschewed intellectualism and pursued money through hard work and thrift. They gained a reputation for "chasing the dollar", but were honest and reliable in their pursuits.

Several novels based on early 20th century New England contain an overplayed dynamic between the dying and shrinking Yankee population and the young Polish immigrants. Polish characters typically came from large families, embodied hard work, and commonly learned English and engaged in relationships with the women in the New England towns. A 1913 novel, The Invaders, which referred to Poles as "beasts" and animal-like, contains a love story between a native New Englander and a Polish immigrant man. The story of amalgamation between a first-generation Polish immigrant and a white native woman is seen as a form of limited acceptance. A 1916 story, Our Naputski Neighbors, similarly depicts a lowly Polish immigrant family in New England which succeeds over its American neighbors. In the story, the younger generation changes their names and marries into a native Yankee family. The story demonstrates a cliché attitude of social and cultural inferiority that Poles carry with them, but that can be easily solved through hygiene, education, learning English, and romantic attachments. In the 1931 story Heirs by Cornelia James Cannon, Poles are recognized as occupying a higher economic space than the protagonist Marilla. In the story, Poles who are Americanized through learning English are given higher status jobs, but she and her husband occupy a space of importance in teaching them English, as she said in one scene, "You can't Americanize without Americans!". In one scene, Marilla sees two young Polish children cutting firewood and teaches them to appreciate the trees as naturalists, rather than for their purpose as fuel. The protagonist's view is somewhat condescending and elitist, although historian Stanislaus Blejwas found the tone of superiority is moderated in later novels written with Polish American characters.

===== Entrepreneurial =====
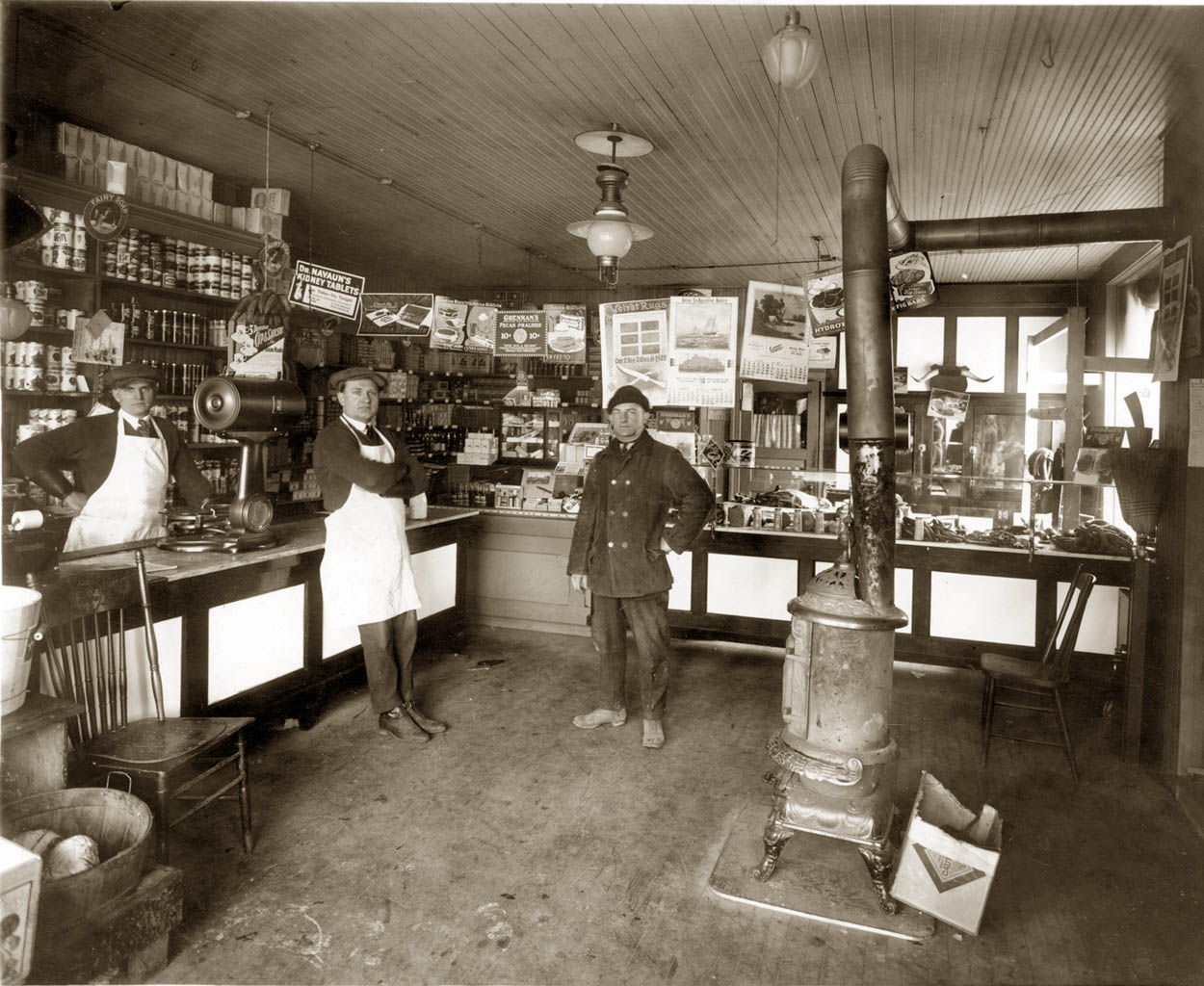
Polish-American grocery, 1922, Detroit, Michigan.

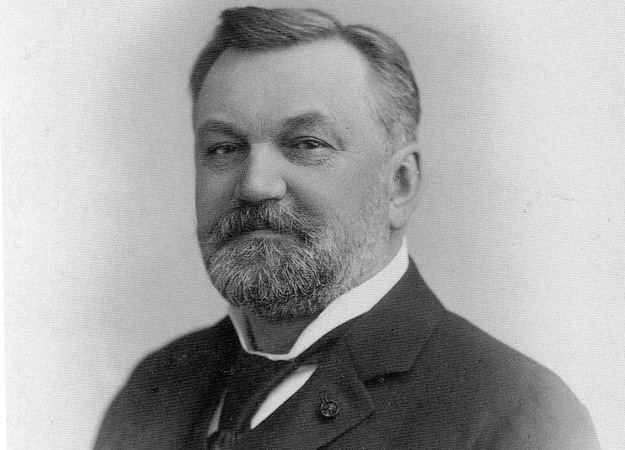
Erazm Jerzmanowski, a Polish-born industrialist who founded lighting-gas companies in Chicago, Baltimore and Indianapolis. He was the richest Pole in the United States in the 19th Century

Very few Poles opened shops, restaurants, stores, or other entrepreneurial ventures. Galician and Russian Poles entered the United States with the least resources and education and performed hard labor throughout their entire careers. Historian John J. Bukowczyk found that German Poles, who entered with "significant resources and advantages" still were tepid in their entrepreneurial risk-taking. For first- and second-generation Poles who entered business, supermarkets and saloons were most popular.

Bukowczyk points to Poles' contentment with steady paychecks as a detriment to their families and future generations. As other immigrant groups, including the Jews, Italians, Greeks, etc. were slowly rising the "ladders of success" through small businesses, Poles were locked in economically by less aggressive, less challenging careers.

==== Early perceptions ====
The immigrants of the late 19th-early 20th century wave were very different from those who arrived in the United States earlier. By and large, those who arrived in the early 19th century were nobility and political exiles; those in the wave of immigration were largely poor, uneducated, and willing to settle for manual labor positions. Pseudoscientific studies were conducted on Polish immigrants in the early 20th century, most notably by Carl Brigham. In A Study of Human Intelligence, which relied heavily on English aptitude tests from the U.S. military, Brigham concluded that Poles have inferior intelligence and their population would dilute the superior "Nordic" American stock. His data was highly damning towards blacks, Italians, Jews, and other Slavs. A United States Congress Joint Immigration Commission study prepared on Polish Americans cited similar studies and said Poles were undesirable immigrants because of their "inherently unstable personalities". In a historical text examining Poland, Nevin Winter described in 1913 that "an extremeness in temperament is a characteristic of the Slav" and asserting this view as an inborn and unchangeable personality trait in Poles as well as Russians. Future U.S. President Woodrow Wilson called Poles, Hungarians, and Italians, in his 1902 History of the American People, "men of the meaner sort" who possessed "neither skill nor energy nor any initiative of quick intelligence." He later called these groups less preferable than the Chinese immigrants. (Note: Wilson 1906, v. 5 p. 212, quoted in The Day (1912, p. 11).) Wilson later apologized, and met publicly with Polish-American leaders. The 1916 book The Passing of the Great Race similarly drew on intelligence studies of immigrants such as Poles to argue that American civilization was in decline and society as a whole would suffer from a steady increase in inferior intelligence.

Polish (and Italian) immigrants demonstrated high fecundity in the United States, and in a U.S. Congress report in 1911, Poles were noted as having the single highest birth rate. The 1911 Dillingham Commission had a section devoted to the Fecundity of Immigrant Women, using data from the 1900 Census. As per Dillingham's findings, there were 40 births per 1,000 Polish people, whereas the non-Polish birth rate was closer to 14 per 1,000. Historians debate the accuracy and sample group of this data, as many Polish immigrants arrived young and of child-bearing age, whereas other ethnics had a lengthy and sustained immigration policy with the United States, meaning multiple generations existed. In reports, the birth rate was very high for Poles and by 1910, the number of children born to Polish immigrants was larger than the number of arriving Polish immigrants. In Polish communities such as rural Minnesota, nearly three-fourths of all Polish women had at least 5 children. The Polish American baby boom lasted from 1906 to 1915 and then fell dramatically, as many of the immigrant mothers had passed out of their prime childbearing age. This was the highest birth rate for American Poles documented in the United States. During the 1920s and 1930s, Polish Americans were coming of age, developing ethnic fraternal organizations, baseball leagues, summer camps, scouting groups, and other youth activities. In large parts of Minnesota and Michigan, over half the population was under sixteen years old. Polish youths created nearly 150 street gangs in Chicago in the 1920s, and in Detroit and Chicago, created the single largest group of inmates in juvenile prisons.

Polish men in particular were romanticized as objects of raw sexual energy in the early 20th century. Many first wave Polish immigrants were single males or married men who left their wives to strike fortune in the United States. Some were "birds of passage" who sought to return to Poland and their families with strong financial savings. They built a reputation in the United States for hard work, physical strength, and vigorous energy. The 1896 novel Yekl: A Tale of the New York Ghetto describes the life of Jake who left his wife and children in Poland behind and began an affair in the United States, when soon his wife meets him in New York. Central to the 1931 romance novel American Beauty is a theme of attractive Polish men. In one instance, main character Temmie Oakes says, "...You saw the sinews rippling beneath the cheap stuff of their sweaty shirts. Far, far too heady a draught for the indigestion of this timorous New England remnant of a dying people. For the remaining native men were stringly of withers, lean shanked, of vinegar blood, and hard wrung." (Note: American Beauty, p. 69, quoted in Blejwas (1985, p. 74).) Historian John Radzilowski notes that the theme of vivacious young immigrants replacing dying old white ethnic populations was common in America until the 1960s and 70s.

==== Immigration agents and Ellis Island ====
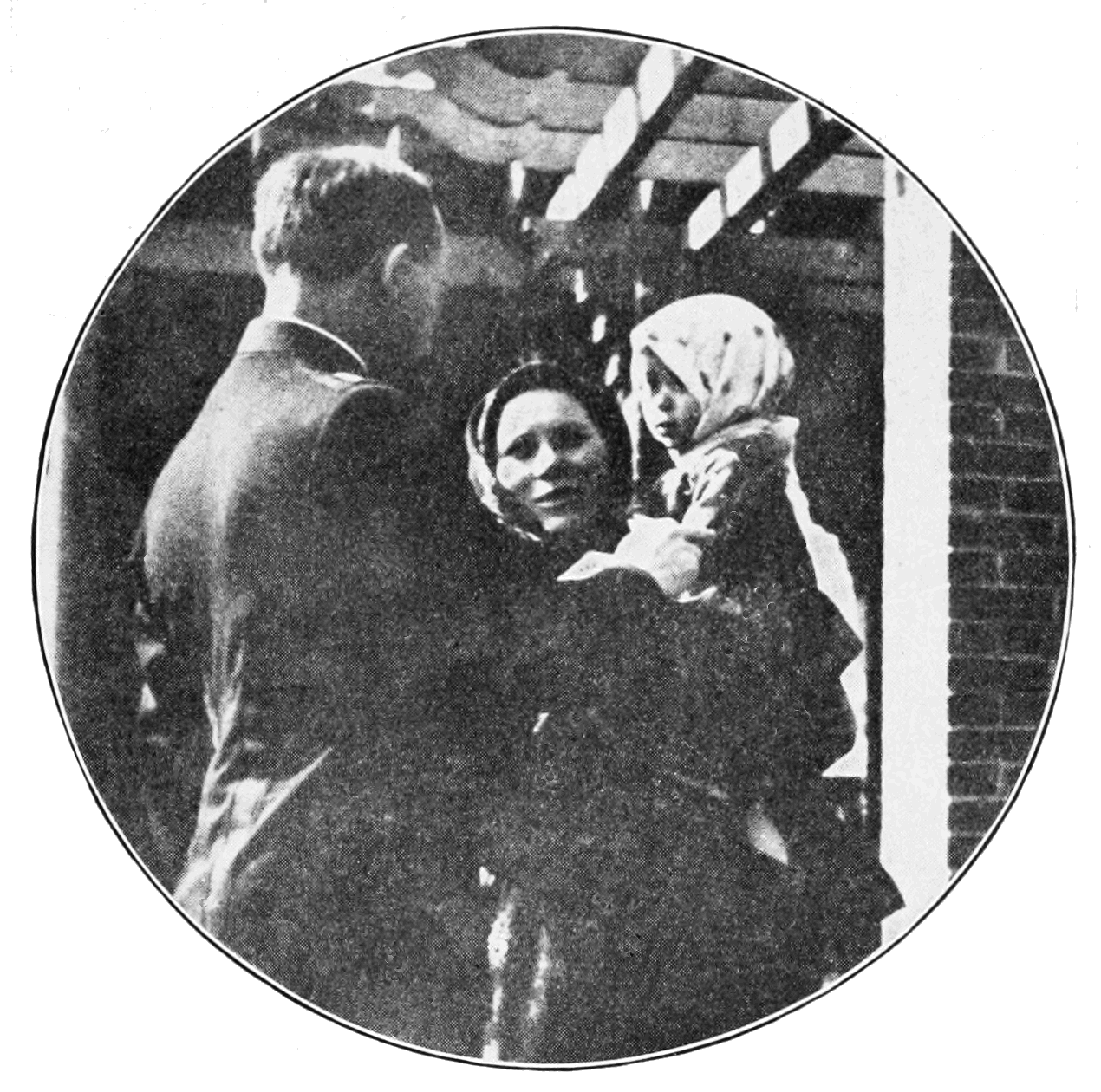
Polish mother holding up her baby for the doctor, Ellis Island. 1913

Immigration from Poland was primarily conducted at Ellis Island, New York, although some people entered via Castle Garden and to a lesser extent, in Baltimore. Ellis Island developed an infamous reputation among Polish immigrants and their children. An American reporter in the 1920s found that Polish immigrants were treated as "third class", and were subject to humiliation, profanity, and brutality at Ellis Island. The Cleveland Polish language daily Wiadomości Codzienne (Polish Daily News) reported that officers at Ellis Island demanded women to strip from the waist up in public view. The immigration of paupers was forbidden by the U.S. Congress beginning with the Immigration Act of 1882. A newsman at Castle Garden found in a single ship of arriving passengers, 265 were "Poles and Slavonians", and 60 were detained as "destitute and likely to become public charges." Polish Americans were disgusted by the Immigration Act of 1924 which restricted Polish immigration to 1890 levels, when there was no Polish nation. A Polish American newspaper stated, "...If the Americans wish to have more Germans and fewer Slavs, why don't they admit that publicly!?" It further went to examine the recent World War with Germany, which was America's enemy, whereas the Polish had been patriotic and loyal to the U.S. Armed Services. Polish Americans were unconvinced that the immigration decreases of the 1920s were for the "protection" of American workers, and Polish language newspapers reflected their distrust and suspicion of racial undertones behind immigration legislation.

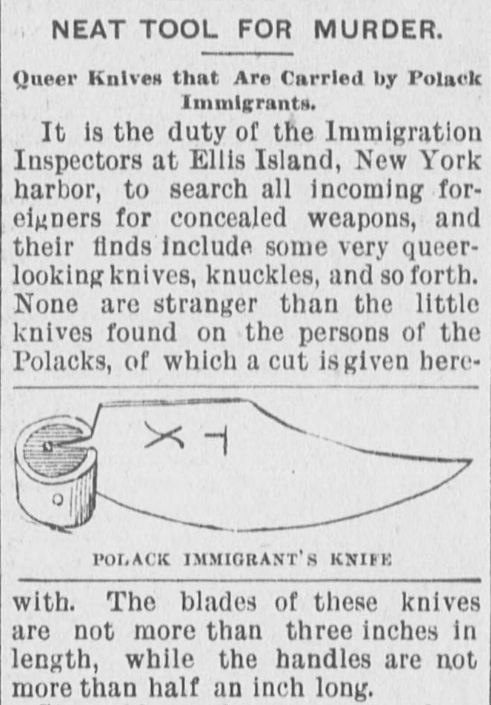
1894 news article describing daggers carried by immigrants from Poland.

Official records of the number of Polish immigrants to the United States are highly inconsistent. A general estimate of over 2 million Polish immigrants is generally stated. Reports as high as 4 million Polish immigrants to the United States has been written, which could be possible if non-Polish immigrants is considered in the total. Polish immigrants were categorized by U.S. immigration agents by nation of origin, usually Austria, Prussia, or Russia (between 1898 and 1919, there was no Polish state). Immigrants during this time were allowed to write or say their "race or people" to an agent. Documents report 1.6 million immigrants arriving between 1821 and 1924 self-reported as being of "Polish race". This is considered an undercount, caused by misinterpretation of the question. Ellis Island officials checked immigrants for weapons and criminal inclinations. In an 1894 news article, Ellis Island inspectors identify daggers found on several Polish immigrants as a reason for increased inspection techniques. Immigration officials at Ellis Island questioned immigrants for their settlement plans, and found that the majority entered the United States with deliberate plans for working on farms and factories, generally in communities with other Poles. A Polish settlement was stated as Mille Lacs County, Minnesota, where Polish immigrants settled to perform agricultural work.

The clothing industry in New York City was staffed by many immigrants from Eastern and Southern Europe. Historian Witold Kula found that many Jewish immigrants, and to a much lesser extent, Italians, were identified upon their arrival to the United States as having work background as tailors even if they did not. Kula identified several letters written by Jewish immigrants back to their families in Poland indicating that they were just learning the trade, when in fact, they had papers stating that it was their native profession. The new immigrants generally did not speak English nor did the immigration agents speak any Polish, Yiddish, or Italian. Kula suggests that the Immigration agents were influenced by the demands of the workforce and essentially staffed the industries based on their expectations of each ethnic group. By 1912, the needle trades were the largest employer of Polish Jews in the United States, and 85% of the needle trade employees were Eastern European Jews.

===== White slavery scare =====
Immigration restrictions were increased considerably in 1903, 1907 and 1910 on white immigrant women, including Poles. Public fears of prostitution and sex trafficking from eastern Europe led to the Mann Act, also referred to as the White Slavery Act of 1910. Eastern European women were rigorously screened for sexually immoral behavior. Few European immigrants were deported, and at its height in 1911, only 253 of over 300,000 European women were deported for "prostitution." In The Qualities of a Citizen, Martha Gardner found there was a "sweeping intent of immigration laws and policies directed at eradicating prostitution by European immigrant women" in the early 20th century, which was absent from the "incriminating and even dismissive treatment of Asian and Mexican prostitutes." This view was expressed in contemporary governmental reports, including the Dillingham Commission which discussed a theme of "white sexual slavery" among eastern European women:

Her earnings may be large—ten times as much in this country as in eastern Europe. She may at times earn in one day from two to four times as much as her washerwoman can earn in a week, but of these earnings she generally gets practically nothing; if she is docile and beautiful and makes herself a favorite with the madam, she may occasionally be allowed to ride in the parks handsomely dressed; she may wear jewelry to attract a customer; but of her earnings the madam will take one-half; she must pay twice as much for board as she would pay elsewhere; she pays three or four times the regular price for clothes that are furnished her; and when these tolls have been taken by the madam, little or nothing is left. She is usually kept heavily in debt in order that she may not escape; and besides that, her exploiters keep the books and often cheat her out of her rightful dues, even under the system of extortion which she recognizes. Frequently she is not allowed to leave the house except in company with those who will watch her; she is deprived of all street clothing; she is forced to receive any visitor who chooses her to gratify his desires, however vile or unnatural; she often contracts loathsome and dangerous diseases and lives hopelessly on, looking forward to an early death.

— U.S. Senate, Importing Women for Immoral Purposes., Presented by Mr. Dillingham. Dec. 10, 1909 to U.S. Senate 61 Congress, 2nd session, Doc. 196. p. 11

The American public felt a deep connection to the issue of white slavery and placed a high moral responsibility on immigration inspectors for their inability to weed out European prostitutes. In a report by the Commissioner General of Immigration in 1914, the Commissioner gave a case-in-point where a young girl from Poland nearly landed an American man a Federal sentence for criminal trafficking after telling immigration officials an "appalling revelation of importation for immoral purposes". She later repudiated her earlier story. According to Gardner, the level of protection and moral standard afforded to European women was very different from the governmental view in the 1870s on Chinese and Japanese immigrants, where virtually all were viewed as "sexual degenerates".

===== Immigration Quotas (1920-1940) =====
Polish immigration was increasing rapidly in the early 20th century until 1911 when it was drastically cut by new legislation. Immigration from Europe was cut severely in 1911, and the quota for Polish immigrants was shrunk drastically. Poles were restricted from coming to the United States for decades, and only after World War II were the immigration laws reversed.

The Poles were the last to come in large numbers before World War I and the Quota Act which choked off immigration. Consequently they were subjected to far more than their share of prejudice and discrimination bred usually not by malice, but by fear—chiefly economic insecurity of the minorities already settled in the areas to which they came. Since other groups did not succeed them in large numbers, they remained for longer than the usual period at the lowest level occupationally and residentially, since others did not "push them up."

— Theresita Polzin, The Polish Americans.

According to James S. Pula, "the drastic reduction in Polish immigration served not only to cut off the external source of immigrants used to perpetuate the urban ethnic communities, but also cut off direct access to cultural renewal from Poland." He said, "increasingly, Polonia's image of Poland became fixed, delimited by the indistinct images of the nineteenth century agricultural villages their ancestors left rather than the developing modern nation that Poland was moving toward during the interwar period." Family members who traveled to Poland to see their families risked not being allowed back if they were not citizens. Polonia leader Lucyan Bójnowski wrote in the 1920s, "In a few decades, unless immigration from Poland is upheld, Polish American life will disappear, and we shall be like a branch cut off from its trunk."

== 20th century ==
=== Growth of a Polish national consciousness ===
National consciousness on foreign soil springs in him (the Polish peasant) spontaneously by realizing the patent difference in his speech, his customs and ideas which set him off from the people who surround him. Everything here is different, so much at variance with what he has known In the country of his origin. He regards himself as a stranger and not understood by others he will seek out people, who could understand him and finds Poles that have come from other districts in Poland than his own. They understand him. They give him advice and extend a helping hand. In their midst he does not feel as though he were an orphan forsaken by all. This heartfelt satisfaction which was evoked in him by one common language and community of ideas with other Poles, that social well-being and homelike atmosphere which he experiences in their company, gives birth to national consciousness and to a feeling that he is a parcel of the Polish nation.

— Stanisław Osada

Polish immigrants to the United States were typically poor peasants who did not have significant involvement in Polish civic life, politics, or education. Poland had not been independent since 1795, and peasants historically had little trust or concern for the State as it was dominated by the Polish nobility. Most 18th- and 19th-century Polish peasants had a great apathy towards nationalist movements and did not find importance or great promise in joining them. Peasants had great reservations identifying with any szlachta, and were reluctant to support any national figures. When Kosciuszko came to liberate Poland–after the success and admiration he gained in the American Revolution–he only succeeded in bringing a handful of supporters, "not even his appearance in peasant attire and his proclamation of individual liberty of the peasants, provided they pay their former landlord their debt and taxes, was able to marshal the masses of burgesses and peasants in the struggle for Polish independence. Joseph Swastek speculated that "an attitude of apprehensive distrust of civil authority" was conditioned by the "political and cultural bondage" of peasants within the 18th- and 19th-century partitioned territories.

Helena Lopata argued that a Polish nationalism grew in Polish Americans during World War I, but fell sharply afterward. Polish immigrants to the United States did not know much about Poland aside from their local villages. In preparation for World War I, the Polish government asked for donations using appeals on behalf of the safety of their loved ones back home, as well as promises of a good high status back in Poland when they returned home. Lopata found that after World War I, many Polish Americans continued to receive requests for aid in Poland, and feelings of anger for all the years they had delayed bettering their own situation were common. Return immigrants who had dreamed of using their American savings to buy status symbols in Poland (farmlands, houses, etc.) were still treated as peasants in Poland, creating resentment towards the motherland.

==== Polish Catholic parish schools ====
Catholic nun teaching Polish Americans in the Polish language, Detroit, Michigan. The phrase "dzieci idą" (children go).

Polish-speakers in the US
Year	Speakers
1910	943,781
1920	1,077,392
1930	965,899
1940	801,680
1960	581,591
1970	419,006
1980	820,647
1990	723,483
2000	667,414
2010	604,371
2014	573,975
1910–1970 figures are of foreign born only.

Polish Americans generally joined local Catholic parishes, where they were encouraged to send their children to parochial schools. Polish-born nuns were often used. In 1932 about 300,000 Polish Americans were enrolled in over 600 Polish grade schools in the United States. Very few of the Polish Americans who graduated from grade school pursued high school or college at that time. High School was not required and enrollment across the United States was far lower at the time. In 1911, only 38 men and 6 women of Polish descent studied at institutions of higher learning.

Polish Americans took to the Catholic schools in great numbers. In Chicago, 36,000 students (60 percent of the Polish population) attended Polish parochial schools in 1920. Nearly every Polish parish in the American Catholic Church had a school, whereas in Italian parishes, it was typically one in ten parishes. Even as late as 1960, about 60% of the Polish American students attended Catholic schools.

It is notable that many of the Polish American priests in the early 20th century were members of the Resurrectionist Congregation, and diverged somewhat from the mainstream American Catholic Church on theology in addition to their language differences. Polish American priests created several of their own seminaries and universities, and founded St. Stanislaus College in 1890.

Milwaukee was one of the most important Polish centers, with 58,000 immigrants by 1902 and 90,000 by 1920. Most came from Germany, and became blue-collar workers in the industrial districts in Milwaukee's south side. They supported numerous civic and cultural organization and 14 newspapers and magazines. The first Polish Catholic parochial school opened in 1868 at the parish of St. Stanislaus. The children would no longer have to attend Protestant-oriented public schools, or German language Catholic schools. The Germans controlled the Catholic Church in Milwaukee, and encouraged Polish-speaking priests and Polish-oriented schools. Starting in 1896, Michał Kruszka began a campaign to introduce Polish language curricula into Milwaukee public schools. His efforts were panned as anti-religious, and thwarted by Catholic and Polish leaders. By the early 20th century, 19 parishes were operating schools, with the School Sisters of Notre Dame, and to a lesser extent the Sisters of Saint Joseph, providing the teaching force. The Polish community rejected proposals to teach Polish in the city's public schools, fearing it would undermine their parochial schools. The Americanization movement in World War I made English the dominant language. In the 1920s, morning lessons were taught in Polish, covering the Bible, Catechism, Church history, Polish language and the history of Poland; all the other courses were taught in English in the afternoon. Efforts to create a Polish high school were unsuccessful until a small one opened in 1934. Those students who went on attended heavily Polish public high school. By 1940, the teachers students and parents preferred English. Elderly priests still taught religion classes in Polish as late as the 1940s. The last traces of Polish culture came in traditional Christmas carols, which are still sung. Enrollments fell during the Great Depression, as parents and teachers were less interested in the Polish language, and were hard-pressed to pay tuition. With the return of prosperity in World War II, enrollments increased again, peaking about 1960. After 1960, the nuns mostly left the sisterhood and were replaced by lay teachers. Increasingly, the original families have moved to the suburbs, and the schools now served black and Hispanic children. Some schools have been closed, or consolidated with historically German language parochial schools.

The 1920s were the peak decade for the Polish language in the United States. A record number of respondents to the U.S. Census reported Polish as their native language in 1920, which has since been dropping as a result of assimilation. According to the 2000 United States Census, 667,000 Americans of age 5 years and older, reported Polish as the language spoken at home, which is about 1.4% of people who speak languages other than English or 0.25% of the U.S. population.

==== Poles and the American Catholic Church ====
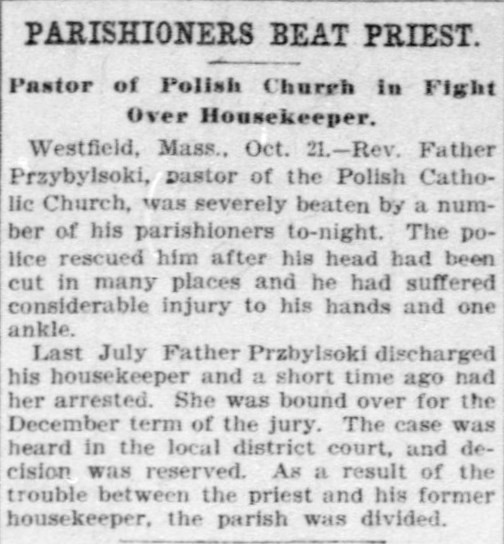
1906 news article in the Washington Herald, detailing a fistfight in a Polish Catholic parish

Polish Americans established their own Catholic churches and parishes in the United States. A general pattern emerged whereby laymen joined a city and united with other Poles to collect funds and develop representative leaders. When the community's size became substantial, they would take the initiative of petitioning a local bishop for permission to build a church with his commitment to supply a priest. Polish immigrants in many instances erected their own churches and then asked for a priest. Roman Catholic churches built in the Polish cathedral style follow a design that includes high ornamentation, decorative columns and buttresses, and many visual depictions of the Virgin Mary and Jesus. When a church was to be built, devout Poles funded their construction with absolute devotion. Some members mortgaged their homes to fund parishes, others loaned monies that their church was never able to repay, and in St. Stanislaus Kostka parish in Chicago, Poles who lived in abject poverty with large families still donated large portions of their paychecks. Polish parishioners attached great meaning to the successful completion of their churches. Father Wacław Kruszka of Wisconsin told his parishioners, "The house of God must be beautiful if it is to be for the praise of God", infusing spiritual motivation into his sermons. Perceived mishandling of church funds was not well tolerated; stories of fistfights and physical assaults on priests suspected of cheating their parishes were well-documented in American newspapers.

Poles (and Italians) were angry with the Americanization and especially "Irishization" of the Catholic Church in America.

Parishes in Poland were generally out of the parishioners' hands. Catholicism had existed for a millennium in Poland, and local nobles (and taxes) were the main financiers of churches. This contrasted with the United States, where the creation of churches relied on immigrants from largely peasant backgrounds. Polish parishes in the United States were generally funded by members of Polish fraternal organizations, the PNA and Polish Roman Catholic Union of America (PRCNU) being the two largest. Members paid dues to belong to these groups. The groups were mutual aid organizations which provided members with financial assistance during times of need, but also gave money to churches. Church committeemen were often leaders in the Polish fraternal societies also. Parishioners who did not pay membership fees were still able to attend mass at the churches, but were viewed as freeloaders for not paying pew rent. The committeemen who ran and handled funds for the fraternal organizations agreed to have Catholic bishops appoint priests and claim property rights to their churches, but wanted to keep their power over church decisions. Galush noted that through the election of church committeemen and direct payment of church expenses, parishioners had grown accustomed to a democratic leadership style, and suggests that this created the ongoing struggle with clergy expecting more authority. In one example, Bishop Ignatius Frederick Horstmann, of the Roman Catholic Diocese of Cleveland, ordered a Polish American priest, Hipolyte Orlowski, to appoint church committeemen instead of holding elections. Orlowski ignored Hortmann's order. Hortmann criticized Orlowski, and wrote "an irate letter" asking "Why do the Poles always cause trouble in this regard?" (Note: For example, Father Anton Francis Kolaszewski resigned as the first resident pastor of St. Stanislaus' church in 1892 after frequent charges were made against him to the diocese. Kolaszewski then formed an independent confederation of churches, in schism from the Catholic Church, known as the American Catholic Church in 1894 at Immaculate Heart of Mary Church in Cleveland, Ohio.) Polish Catholics generally did not differ on Catholic theology. Polish customs taken into American churches include the Pasterka (a midnight mass celebrated between December 24 and 25), the gorzkie żale (bitter lamentations devotion), and święconka (blessing of easter eggs).

==== Founding of the Polish National Church ====
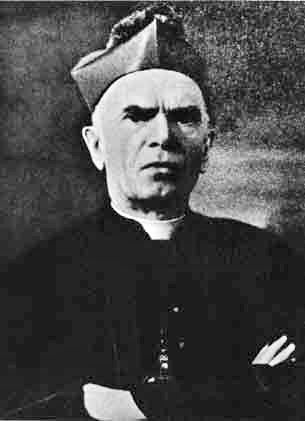
Francis Hodur, founder and Prime Bishop of the Polish National Catholic Church in America

Many Polish Americans were devout Catholics and placed pressure on the Church to have services in Polish and include them in the priesthood and bishopric. Polish Americans grew deeply frustrated by their lack of representation in the church leadership; many loyal parishioners were offended that they could not participate in church decision-making or finances. Polish parishioners who collectively donated millions of dollars to construct and maintain churches and parishes in the United States were concerned that these church properties were now legally owned by German and Irish clergy. The Polish-German relations in church parishes was tense during the 19th century. At the St. Boniface parish of Chicago, James Marshall spoke English and German for years, but when he started conducting mass in Polish, German parishioners started a confrontation with him and forced him into resignation. The greatest confrontation occurred in Scranton, Pennsylvania, where a large Polish population settled to work in coal mines and factories in the 1890s. They saved money from small paychecks to build a new church in the Roman Catholic parish, and were offended when the church sent an Irish bishop, William O'Hara, to lead services. Polish parishioners requested repeatedly to partake in church affairs; they were turned down and the bishop repudiated their "disobedience". Parishioners had fights in front of the church and several were arrested by the local police for civil disobedience and criminal charges. The mayor of the city was also Irish, and Poles strongly disagreed with his decisions in determining the severity of the arrests. Reportedly, Francis Hodur, a Catholic priest serving a few miles away heard the stories from Polish parishioners and said, "Let all those who are dissatisfied and feel wronged in this affair set about organizing and building a new church, which shall remain in possession of the people themselves. After that, we shall decide what further steps are necessary." Parishioners followed his advice and purchased land and began building a new church; when they asked Bishop O'Hara to bless the building and appoint a pastor, he refused, asking for a title of the property to be written out in his name. O'Hara invoked the Council of Baltimore saying that laypeople had no right to create and own their own church without ceding to the Roman Catholic diocese. Hodur disagreed and led church services beginning March 14, 1897. Hodur was excommunicated from the Roman Catholic Church on October 22, 1898 for refusing to cede ownership of the church property and insubordination.

Membership of the PNCC
Year	Members	Ref.
1904	15,473	
1923	28,000	
1926	61,874	
1936	186,000	
1950	250,000	
1992	350,000	

Francis Hodur's Polish church grew as neighboring Polish families defected from the Roman Catholic Church. Polish parishioners were hesitant to leave at first, but the organization of the Polish National Union in America in 1908 created mutual insurance benefits and aided in securing burial space for the deceased. The Polish National Catholic Church expanded from a regional church in Pennsylvania when Poles in Buffalo defected in 1914, expanding the church. Lithuanians in Pennsylvania united to form their own Lithuanian National Catholic Church, and in 1914, joined with the Polish National Church. The Lithuanian and Slovak National churches (1925) have since joined in affiliation with the larger Polish National Catholic Church. The PNCC took no initiative in seeking out other ethnic breakaway Catholic Churches during its history; these churches often sought out the PNCC as a model and asked to be affiliated. In 1922, four Italian parishes in New Jersey defected from the Roman Catholic Church and asked Hodur to support them in fellowship. Hodur blessed one of their buildings, and another Italian congregation in the Bronx, New York united with the PNCC before its closure. The PNCC has been sympathetic of the property rights and self-determination of laypeople in the church; in the PNCC's St. Stanislaus church, a stained glass window of Abraham Lincoln exists and Lincoln's birthday is a church holiday. Lincoln is honored by the PNCC for his role as a lawyer defending Irish Catholics who refused to surrender their church property to the Catholic church. The PNCC grew to a national entity and spread to Polish communities across the United States during the 20th century, mainly around Chicago and the Northeast. The PNCC developed an active mission in Poland following World War I.

==== Profiling after McKinley assassination ====
Leon Czolgosz, a Polish American born in Alpena, Michigan, changed American history in 1901 by assassinating U.S. President William McKinley. Though Czolgosz was a native-born citizen, the American public displayed high anti-Polish and anti-immigrant sentiment after the attack. McKinley, who survived the shooting for several days, called Czolgosz a "common murderer", and did not make mention of his background. Different Slavic groups debated his ethnic origins in the days and weeks that followed the attack, and Hungarian Americans took effort to also distance themselves from him. Police who arrested him reported that Czolgosz himself identified as a Pole. The Polish American community in Buffalo was deeply ashamed and angry with the negative publicity that Czolgosz created, both for their community and the Pan-American Exposition, and canceled a Polish American parade following the attack. Polish Americans burned effigies of Czolgosz in Chicago and Polish American leaders publicly repudiated him.

The Milwaukee Sentinel posted on September 11, 1901 an editorial noting that Czolgosz was an anarchist acting alone, without any ties to the Polish people:

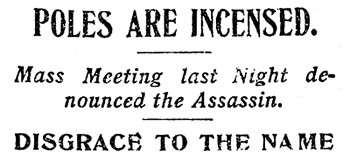
Polish Americans were outraged at President McKinley's assassin, feeling disgraced and angry

Czolgosz is not a Pole. He is an American citizen, born, bred and educated in this country. His Polish name and extraction have nothing whatever to do with his crime, or with the motives which impelled him to it. The apparent notion, therefore, of Polish-Americans that it is incumbent on them to show in some special and distinctive way their abhorrence of Czolgosz and his deed, while creditable to them as a sentiment, is not founded in reason. Responsibility for Czolgosz' crime is a question not of race but of doctrine. Anarchism knows no country, no fatherland. It is a cancer eating into the breast of society at large.

— Not a Race Question, Not a Race Question, Milwaukee Sentinel, 11 Sept. 1901

As a result of the assassination, Polish Americans were "racially profiled" and American nativism against Poles grew. Several Polish immigrants were arrested for questioning in the police investigation, but police found that he acted independently. A later anonymous copycat threat sent to the police in Boston was investigated, and neighbors claimed a Polish radical who was a "native of the same town as the assassin" (Żnin) to be the culprit. No actual crime occurred in coincidence with the threatening letter. Theodore Roosevelt took the office of President of the United States in McKinley's place. Radical groups and anarchists were quelled nationally, and federal legislation was taken to stop future assassinations. Federal legislation made an attempted assassination of the President a capital offense and despite the fact that Czolgosz was born in the United States, the Immigration Act of 1903 was passed to stop immigrants with subversive tendencies from entering the country.

==== Ethnic isolation and low status ====
Polish immigrants were the lowest paid white ethnic group in the United States. A study of immigrants before World War I found that in Brooklyn, New York, the average annual income was $721. The average for Norwegians residing there was $1142; for the English, $1015, for Czechs, $773; but for Poles, only $595. A study by Richard J. Jensen at the University of Illinois found that despite the pervasive narrative of anti-Irish discrimination in the U.S., in reality, NINA signage was very rare and first-generation Irish immigrants were about average in job pay rates during the 1880s and certainly above average by the turn of the century. Despite the absence of explicit ethnic discrimination in job advertisements, immigrant Poles were higher on the index of job segregation measures than the Irish in both the 1880s and the 1930s.

However, by the 1960s, Polish Americans had an above average annual income, even though relatively few were executives or professionals. Kantowicz argues that:

Polish workers appear to have opted for monetary success in unionized jobs and for economic and psychological security in home-owning rather than for more prestigious occupations in business and the professions.

Anti-Polish sentiment in the early 20th century relegated Polish immigrants to a below average social status in American society. Other white ethnic groups such as the Irish and Germans had assimilated to the American language and gained powerful positions in the Catholic Church and in various government positions by this time, and Poles were far behind. Poles did not share in any political or religious say in the United States until 1908, when the first American bishop of Polish descent was appointed in Chicago, Illinois - Paul Peter Rhode. His appointment was the result of growing pressure placed on the Illinois Archdiochese by Polish Americans eager to have a bishop of their own background. The Pope himself finally acquiesced when Chicago Archbishop James Edward Quigley finally lobbied on behalf of his Polish parishioners in Rome. Poles were viewed as powerful workers, suited for their uncommonly good physical health, endurance, and stubborn character, capable of heavy work from dawn to dusk. The majority of Polish immigrants were young men of in superior physical health, feeding well into the stereotype, and the lack of a significant immigration of intelligentsia perpetuated this perception in the United States. Historian Adam Urbanski drew an observation through The Immigrant Press and its Control, which stated, "Loneliness in an unfamiliar environment turns the wanderers' thoughts and affections back upon his native land. The strangeness of his new surroundings emphasizes his kinship with those he has lost." Polish immigrants viewed themselves as common workers and carried an inferiority complex where they saw themselves as outsiders and only wanted peace and security within their own Polish communities; many found comfort in the economic opportunities and religious freedoms that made living in the United States a less strange experience.

=== World War I (1914–18) ===
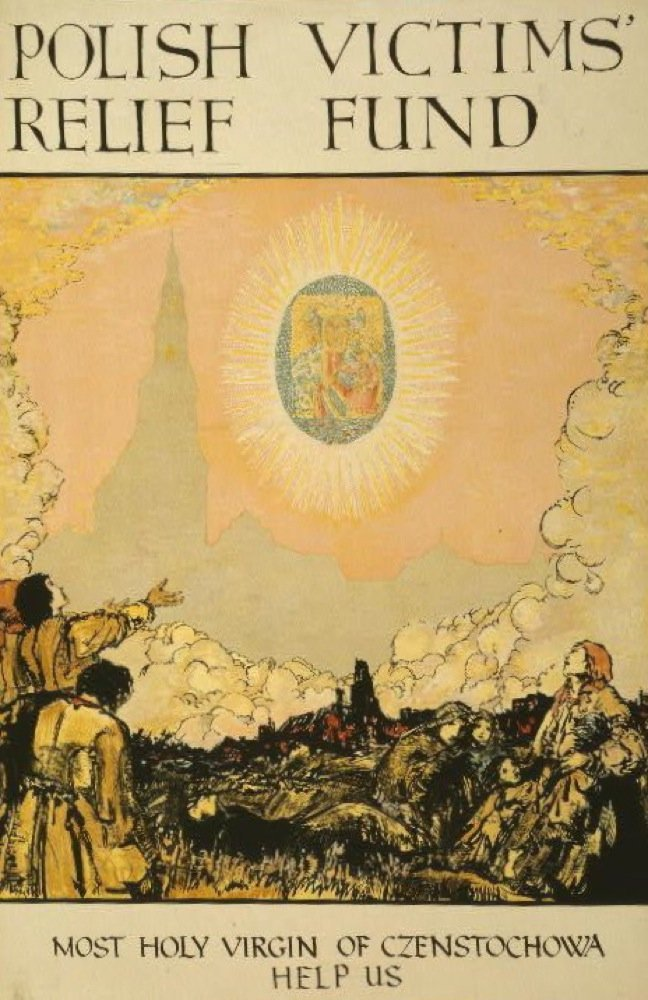
Polish Victims War Relief Fund posters with appeals for help from the American public, 1915

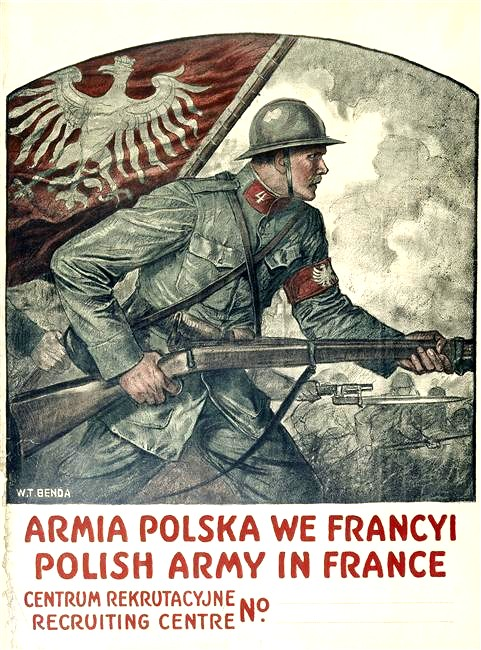
Recruitment poster calling for volunteers for the Polish Army to fight against Germany in 1918

Polish-Americans who fought in the Blue Army. Image taken in Detroit, Michigan (1955) and featured in Life Magazine

World War I motivated Polish-Americans to contribute to the cause of defeating the Germans, freeing their homeland, and fighting for their new home. Polish Americans vigorously supported the war effort during World War I, with large numbers volunteering for or drafted into the United States Army, working in war-related industries, and buying war bonds. A common theme was to fight for America and for the restoration of Poland as a unified, independent nation. Polish Americans were personally affected by the War because they heard reports of Poles being used as soldiers for both the Allied and Central Powers, and Polish newspapers confirmed fatalities for many families. Communication was very difficult to their families in Poland and immigration was halted. After the war The Literary Digest estimated that the U.S. army had 220,000 Poles in its ranks and reported that Polish names made up 10 percent of the casualty lists, while the proportion of Poles in the country amounted to 4 percent. Of the first 100,000 volunteers to enlist in the U.S. Armed Services during World War I, over 40% were Polish American.

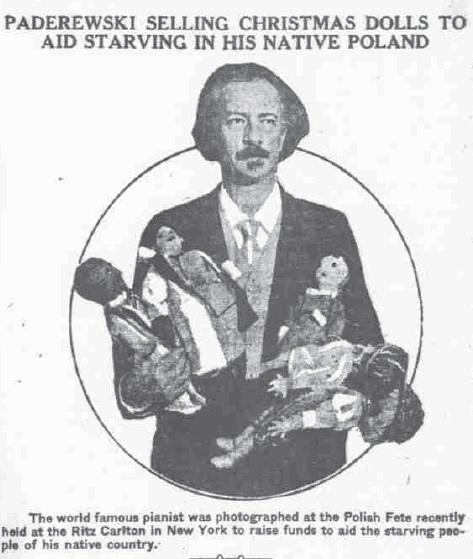
Ignacy Paderewski mobilizing support for Poland by selling Christmas dolls at the Ritz Carlton in New York

France in 1917 decided to set up a Polish Army, to fight on the Western Front under French command. Canada was given responsibility for recruiting and training. It was known as the Blue Army because of its uniform. France lobbied for the Polish Army idea, pressuring Washington to allow recruiting in Polonia. The U.S. in 1917 finally agreed by sanctioning recruiting of men who were ineligible for the draft. This included recent Polish immigrants who did not pass the five-year residency requirements for citizenship. Also there were Poles born in Germany or Austria who were thus considered enemy aliens ineligible for drafting into the United States Army. The so-called "blue army" reached nearly 22,000 men from the U.S. and over 45,000 from Europe (mostly POWs) out of a planned 100,000. It entered battle in summer 1918. When the war ended the Blue Army under General Józef Haller de Hallenburg was moved to Poland where it helped establish the new state. Most veterans who originated in the U.S. returned to the U.S. in the 1920s, but they never received recognition as veterans by either the U.S. or the Polish government.

Polish pianist Ignacy Paderewski came to the U.S. and asked immigrants for help. He raised awareness of the plight and suffering in Poland before and after World War I. Paderewski used his name recognition to promote the sale of dolls to benefit Poland. The dolls, dressed in traditional Polish garb, had "Halka and Jan" as main characters. Sales provided enough money for the Polish refugees in Paris who designed the dolls to survive, and extra profits were used to purchase and distribute food to the poor in Poland.

Wilson designated January 1, 1916 as Polish Relief Day. Contributions to the Red Cross given that day were used to give relief to Poland. Polish Americans frequently pledged a working day's pay to the cause. American Poles purchased over $67 million in Liberty Loans during World War I to help finance the war.

=== Interwar period (1920s and 1930s) ===
By 1917 there were over 7000 Polish organizations in the United States, with a membership - often overlapping - of about 800,000 people. The most prominent were the Polish Roman Catholic Union founded in 1873, the PNA (1880) and the gymnastic Polish Falcons (1887). Women also established separate organizations.

The PNA was formed in 1880 to mobilize support among Polish Americans for the liberation of Poland; it discouraged Americanization before World War I. Down until 1945 it was locked in battle with the rival organization Polish Roman Catholic Union. It then focused more on its fraternal roles such as social activities for its membership. By the 1980s it focused on its insurance program, with 300,000 members and assets of over $176 million.

The first Polish politicians were now seeking major offices. In 1918 a Republican was elected to Congress from Milwaukee, the next one was elected to Congress in 1924 as a Republican from Detroit. In the 1930s, the Polish vote became a significant factor in larger industrial cities, and switched heavily into the Democratic Party. Charles Rozmerek, the PNA president from 1939 to 1969, built a political machine from the Chicago membership, and played a role in Chicago Democratic politics.

Following World War I, the reborn Polish state began the process of economic recovery and some Poles tried to return. Since all the ills of life in Poland could be blamed on foreign occupation, the migrants did not resent the Polish upper classes. Their relation with the mother country was generally more positive than among migrants of other European countries. It is estimated that 30% of the Polish emigrants from lands occupied by the Russian Empire returned home. The return rate for non-Jews was closer to 50–60%. More than two-thirds of emigrants from Polish Galicia (freed from under the Austrian occupation) also returned.

==== Anti-Immigrant nativism (1920s) ====
American nativism countered the immigration and assimilation of Poles into the United States. In 1923, Carl Brigham dismissed the Poles as inferior in intelligence. He even defended his assertions against popular support for Kościuszko and Pulaski, well-known Polish heroes from the American Revolution, stating, "careless thinkers [...] select one or two striking examples of ability from a particular group, and [believe] that they have overthrown an argument based on the total distribution of ability." Orators "can not alter the distribution of the intelligence of the Polish immigrant. All countries send men of exceptional ability to America, but the point is that some send fewer than others."

Polish communities in the United States were targeted by Nativist groups and sympathizers during the 1920s. In White Deer, Texas, where Poles were virtually the only ethnic minority, Polish children had near-daily fights with other schoolchildren, and southerners imitated their parents in calling them "Polocks and damn Catholics". The Ku Klux Klan in particular rose in numbers and political activity during the 1920s, leading parades, protests, and violence in Polish American neighborhoods. On May 18, 1921, about 500 white-robed, torch-bearing members from Houston took a train to Brenham, Texas and marched carrying signs such as "Speak English or quit talking on Brenham's streets". Physical attacks on German Americans were more common than for Poles, who were not as politically active in Brenham. Following the parade, residents would not come to the town or leave their homes to go to church, afraid of violence. To defuse the situation, a meeting at a local courthouse between Anglo, German, and Slavic leaders created laws requiring funeral services, church sermons, and business transactions to be conducted in English only for the next few months. During the time, Brenham was popularly known as the "Capital of Texas Polonia" because of its large Polish population. The KKK led a similar anti foreigner event in Lilly, Pennsylvania in 1924, which had a significant number of Poles. A novel based on the historical experience of Polish Americans in Lilly, Pennsylvania during this affair is The Masked Family by Robert Jeschonek. The Klan infiltrated the local police of southern Illinois during the 1920s, and search warrants were freely given to Klan groups who were deputized as prohibition officers. In one instance in 1924, S. Glenn Young and 15 Klansmen raided a Polish wedding in Pittsburg, Illinois, violently pushing everyone against the walls, drank their wine, stole their silver dollars, and stomped on the wedding cake. The Polish couple had informed Mayor Arlie Sinks and Police chief Mun Owens beforehand that they were throwing a wedding and wanted to ensure protection; they did not know that Sinks and Owens themselves were Klansmen.

==== Prohibition Era ====
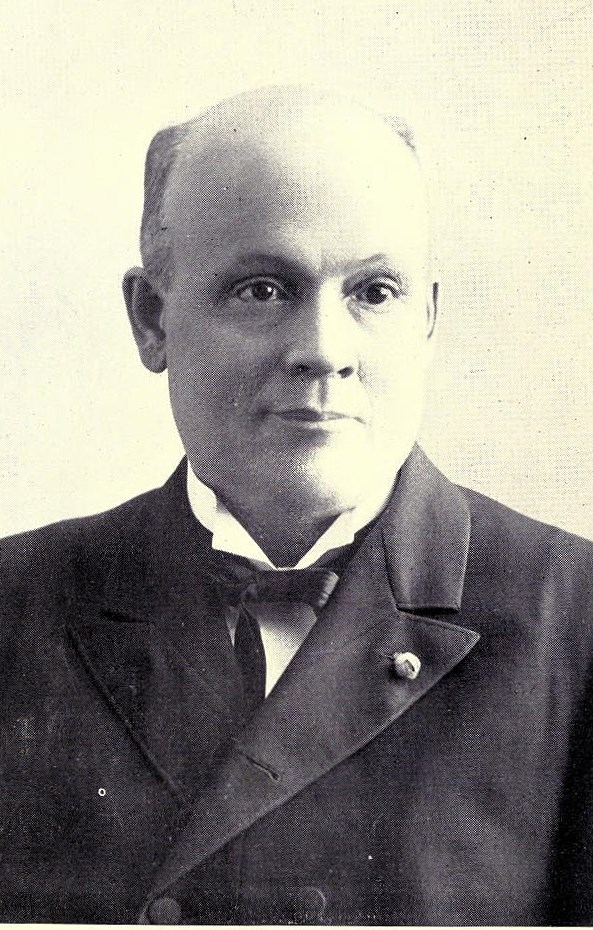
John Sobieski, a lineal descendant of John III Sobieski, served in the U.S. Civil War and later made hundreds of speeches to prohibition-camps in the Midwest

Polish Americans were represented in the American temperance movement, and the first wave of immigrants was affected by prohibition. A leading Pole in the Temperance movement in the United States was Colonel John Sobieski, a lineal descendant of Polish King John III Sobieski, who served as a Union general in the American Civil War. In 1879, he married a prominent abolitionist and prohibitionist Lydia Gertrude Lemen, an American from Salem, Illinois. Through his wife's affiliation, he became a leading member of the Polish branch of the Women's Christian Temperance Union, and preached against alcohol in Ohio, Wisconsin, and Illinois to prohibition-camps. Sobieski and the predominantly Protestant Christian Temperance groups never made great in-roads into the Polish community. Polish Catholics immigrants frequently heard lectures and received literature from the Catholic Church against alcohol. Polish immigrants were distrustful of the Irish-dominated American Catholic Church, and did not resonate with the temperance movement in great numbers. A visit by Archbishop John Ireland to the PNA in St. Paul in 1887 was ineffective in drawing them to the Catholic Total Abstinence Union of America. The Polish language press covered the topic of abstinence occasionally in the U.S. It was not until 1900 that the PNA introduced sanctions for alcoholics among its membership, and abstinence generally was unpopular among American Poles. In New Britain, Connecticut, Father Lucian Bojnowski started an abstinence association which offended a local Polish club, he received a death threat in response. In 1911, Father Walter Kwiatkowski founded a newspaper called Abystynent (The Abstainer) promoting local abstinence societies. The newspaper did not last long, and the Polish abstinence groups never united. The Polish National Catholic Church never created official policies towards abstinence from alcohol, nor took it as a priority that differed from the Catholic Church.

Polish immigrants were attracted to saloons – drinking was a popular social activity. Saloons allowed Poles to relieve their stresses from difficult physical labor, the selling of steamship tickets, and meeting grounds for mutual aid societies and political groups. Among Polish immigrants, a saloon-keeper was a favorite entrepreneurship opportunity, second only to a grocery store owner. By 1920, when alcohol was prohibited in the United States, American Poles continued to drink and run bootlegging operations. Contemporary Polish language newspapers decried a pervasive alcoholism among Polish American families, where mothers would brew liquor and beer at home for their husbands (and sometimes children). Although small in both numbers and scope, Poles joined organized crime and mafia-related distribution networks of alcohol in the U.S.

==== Contribution to the American labor movement ====
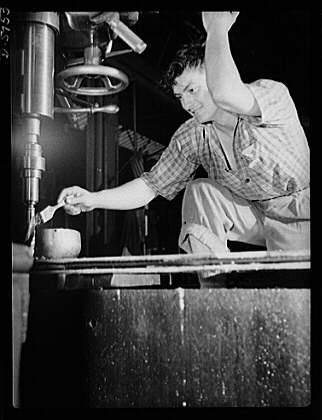
Polish American machinist in Chicago, Illinois. 1942

Polish Americans were active in strikes and trade union organizations during the early 20th century. Many Polish Americans worked in industrial cities and in organized trades, and contributed to historical labor struggles in large numbers. Many Polish Americans contributed to strikes and labor uprisings, and political leaders emerged from the Polish community. Leo Krzycki, a Socialist leader known as a "torrential orator", was hired by different trade unions such as the Congress of Industrial Organizations to educate and agitate American workers in both English and Polish during the 1910s to the 1930s. Krzycki was an organizer for the Amalgamated Clothing Workers of America. He motivated worker strikes in the Chicago-Gary steel strike of 1919 and the packing-house workers of Chicago strike in 1921. Krzycki was often used for his effectiveness in mobilizing Americans of Polish descent, and was heavily inspired by Eugene Debs and the Industrial Workers of the World. He was associated with the sit-down strike at the Goodyear Tire and Rubber Company in Akron, Ohio in 1936, which was the first twenty-four hour sit-down. Krzycki was one of the main speakers during the protest that later became known as the Memorial Day massacre of 1937. Polish Americans made up 85% of the union of Detroit Cigar Workers in 1937, during the longest sitdown strike in U.S. history.

==== The Great Depression ====
The Great Depression in the United States hurt the Polish American communities across the country as heavy industry and mining sharply cut employment. During the prosperous 1920s, the predominantly Polish Hamtramck neighborhood suffered from an economic slowdown in the manufacturing sector of Detroit. The Hamtramck neighborhood was in disrepair, with poor public sanitation, high poverty, rampant tuberculosis, and overcrowding, and at the height of the Depression in 1932, nearly 50% of all Polish Americans were unemployed. Those who continued to work in the nearby Dodge main plant, where a majority of workers were Polish, faced intolerable conditions, poor wages, and were demanded to speed up production beyond reasonable levels. As the industrial trades Polish Americans worked in became less financially stable, an influx of Blacks and poor southern Whites into Detroit and Hamtramck exacerbated the job market and competed directly with Poles for low-paying jobs. Corporations benefited from the interracial strife and routinely hired Blacks as strikebreakers against the predominantly Polish-American trade unions. The Ford Motor Company used Black strikebreakers in 1939 and 1940 to counter strikes by the United Auto Workers, which had a predominantly Polish-American membership. The mainly Polish UAW membership and pro-Ford Black loyalists fought at the gates of the plant, often in violent clashes. Tensions with blacks in Detroit was heightened by the construction of a federally funded housing project, the Sojourner Truth houses, near the Polish community in 1942. Polish Americans lobbied against the houses, but their political sway was ineffective. Racial tensions finally exploded in the race riot of 1943.

== World War II ==
Polish Americans lining up to make donations to Poland's war relief, 1939. Hamtramck, Detroit.

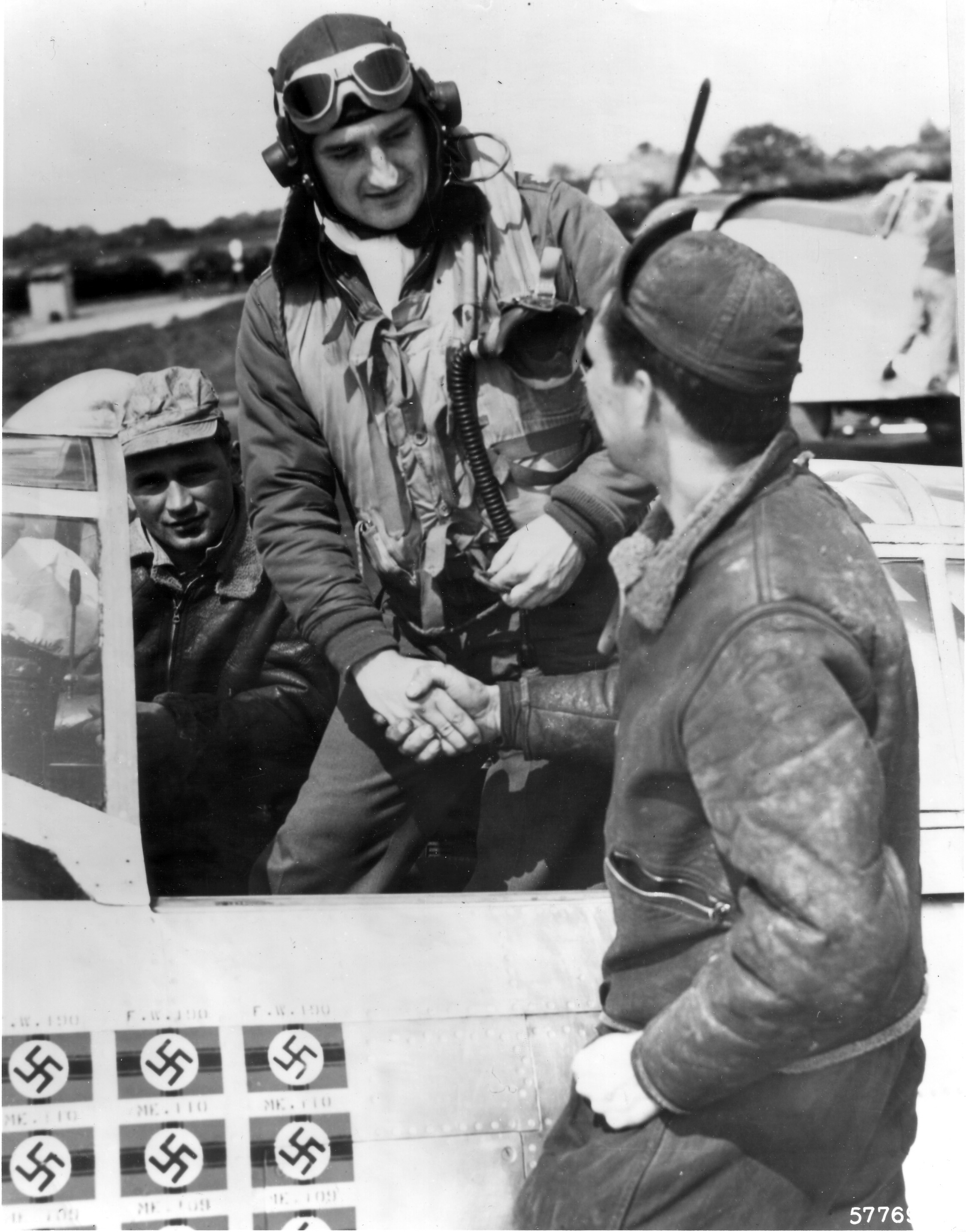
Francis Gabreski and S/Sgt. Ralph Safford, his crew chief. The assistant crew chief Felix Schacki is in the background.

Polish Americans were strong supporters of Roosevelt and the Allies against Nazi Germany. They worked in war factories, tended victory gardens, and purchased large numbers of war bonds. Of a total 5 million self-identified Polish Americans, 900,000 to 1,000,000 (20% of their entire population in the U.S.) joined the U.S. Armed Services. Americans of Polish descent were common in all the military ranks and divisions, and were among the first to volunteer for the war effort. Polish Americans had been enthusiastic enlistees in the U.S. military in 1941. They composed 4% of the American population at the time, but over 8% of the U.S. military during World War II. Matt Urban was among the most decorated war heroes. Francis Gabreski won accolades during World War II for his victories in air fights, later to be named the "greatest living ace." During World War II, General Władysław Sikorski attempted to recruit Polish Americans to a segregated battalion; crowds of men he spoke to in Buffalo, Chicago, and Detroit were frequently second and third generation and did not join in high numbers—only 700 Poles from North America and 900 from South America joined the Polish Army. Historians identified Sikorski's tone towards the Polish American diaspora as problematic because he repeatedly told people he did not want their money but only wanted young men in the military. He said Polonia was "turning its back" on Poland by not joining the cause.

During the latter part of World War II, Polish Americans developed a strong interest in political activity ongoing in Poland. Generally, Polish American leaders took the position that Polish Prime Minister Władysław Sikorski should make deals and negotiate with the Soviet Union. Maksymilian Węgrzynek, editor of the New York Nowy Swiat, was fiercely anti-Soviet and founded the National Committee of Americans of Polish Descent (KNAPP) in 1942 to oppose Soviet occupation in Poland. His newspaper became an outlet for exiled Polish leaders to voice their distrust and fears of a disintegrating Polish government under Wladyslaw Sikorski. One such leader was Ignacy Matuszewski who opposed any negotiation with the Soviets without safeguards honoring Polish territorial claims. The majority of American Poles were in-line with the anti-Soviet views of Wegrzynek.

Three important pro-Soviet Polish Americans were Leo Krzycki, Stanislaw Orlemanski, and Oskar R. Lange. They were deeply resented by Polish Americans in New York and Chicago, but found a strong following in Detroit, Michigan. Orlemanski founded the Kosciusko League in Detroit in 1943 to promote American-Soviet friendship. His organization was entirely of Polish Americans and was created with the goal of expanding throughout Polonia. Lange had great influence among Detroit Poles, arguing that Poland could return to its "democratic" roots by ceding territories on the Curzon Line to the Belarusians and Ukrainians, and distributing farmland to the peasants. His viewpoints were well aligned with those of later American and Soviet agreements, whereby Poland gained western territories from Germany. In 1943, Lange, Orlemanski, and U.S. Senator James Tunnell wrote a book outlining their foreign policy aims with respect to Poland, titled, We will Join Hands with Russia. Russian newspapers including Pravda featured supportive articles approving of the work that Detroit Poles were making, and singled Krzycki, Orlemanski, and Lange as heroic leaders. On January 18, 1944, Russian diplomat Vyacheslav Molotov met with American ambassador Harriman, saying Poland needed a regime change and Krzycki, Orlemanski, and Lange would be excellent candidates for leadership in Poland. Stalin promoted the idea and asked that Orlemanski and Lange be given Russian passports quickly and allowed to visit Russia. President Roosevelt agreed to process those passports quickly, and later agreed to many of the political points they made, but advised Stalin that the visit be kept secretive. Lange visited Russia, meeting with Stalin personally, as well as the Polish nationalist government. Lange later returned to the United States where he pushed Polish Americans to accept that Poland would cede the Curzon line, and a communist regime change in Poland was inevitable.

=== Aftermath in Polonia ===
American Poles had a reinvigorated interest in Poland during and after World War II. Polish American newspapers, both anti and pro-Soviet in persuasion, wrote articles supporting Poland's acquisition of the Oder-Neisse line from Germany at the close of the war. The borders of Poland were in flux after the war, since Nazi occupying forces were mainly withdrawn, and Poland's claims did not have German recognition. Polish Americans were apprehensive about the U.S. commitment to assuring them the western territories. The Potsdam Agreement specifically stated that Poland's borders would be "provisional" until an agreement with Germany was signed. At the close of the war, America occupied West Germany and relations with the Eastern bloc became increasingly difficult because of Soviet domination. Polish Americans feared that America's occupation of, and close relations with, West Germany would mean a distancing from Poland. West Germany received many German refugees who escaped Communist hostility in Poland, and their stories of persecution and hostility were not helpful to Polish-German relations. The Polish American Congress (PAC) was established in 1944 to ensure that Polish Americans (6 million at the time) had a political voice to support Poland following World War II. The PAC traveled to Paris in 1946 to stop the United States Secretary of State, James F. Byrnes, from making further agreements with Germany. Byrnes and Soviet Minister of Foreign Affairs Vyacheslav Molotov both were making speeches expressing support for an economically and politically unified Germany, and both invoked the "provisional" nature of the Oder-Neisse line in their talks. Polish Americans were outraged when Byrnes stated in Germany that German public opinion should be accounted for in territorial claims. The Polish newspaper Glos Ludu made a cartoon of Byrnes in front of an American flag with Swatstikas and black heads instead of stars, criticizing his support of Germany as a "sell-out". Even pro-Soviet Polish Americans called those lands "Recovered Territories", suggesting wide and popular support among American Poles. The PAC remained distrustful of the United States government during the Truman administration and afterwards. In 1950, after East Germany and Poland signed an agreement on the Oder-Neisse line making it officially Polish territory, the U.S. Commissioner in Germany, John J. McCloy, issued a statement saying that a final resolution on the border would require another peace conference.

== Postwar ==
=== Second wave of immigration (1939–89) ===
A wave of Polish immigrants came to the United States following World War II. They differed from the first wave in that they did not want to, and often could not, return to Poland. They assimilated rather quickly, learned English, and moved into the American middle class with less discrimination than had been faced by the first wave. This group of immigrants also had a strong Polish identity; Poland created a strong national and cultural identity during the 1920s and the 1930s when it gained independence, and immigrants carried much of that cultural influx to the United States. Poles in the second wave were much more likely to seek white-collar and professional positions, take pride in expressing Poland's cultural and historical successes, and not submit to the low status that American Poles had taken in previous generations. The background of these immigrants varied widely. Historically, 5 or 6 million Poles lived in territories annexed by the Soviet Union during World War II. Many were aristocrats, students, university graduates, and middle-class citizens who were systematically categorized by the Soviet police. Polish military officers were killed in Katyn, and civilians were deported to remote territories in Central Asia or Nazi concentration camps. During the War, Poles attempted to seek refuge in the United States, and some were allowed in. Following the War, many Poles escaped Soviet oppression by fleeing to sympathetic Western nations such as the United Kingdom, France, and the United States.

A small steady immigration for Poland has taken place since 1939. Political refugees arrived after the war. In the 1980s about 34,000 refugees arrived fleeing communism in Poland, along with 29,000 regular immigrants. Most of the newcomers were well-educated professionals and artists of political activists and typically did not settle into the long-established neighborhoods.

=== Since 1945 ===
In 1945, the Red Army took control and Poland became a Soviet-controlled satellite state until it broke free with American support in 1989. Many Polish Americans viewed Roosevelt's treaties with Stalin as backhanded tactics, and feelings of betrayal were high in the Polish community. After the war, however, some higher status Poles were outraged with Roosevelt's acceptance of Stalin's control over Poland; they shifted their vote in the 1946 congressional elections to conservative Republicans who opposed the Yalta agreement and foreign policy in Eastern Europe. However, working-class Polish Americans remained loyal to the Democratic Party in the face of a Republican landslide that year. Into the 1960s, Polonia as a whole continued to vote solidly for the liberal New Deal Coalition and for local Democratic party organization candidates.

The first candidate on a national ticket was Senator Edmund S Muskie (Marciszewski), nominated by the Democrats for vice president in 1968. He was a prominent, but unsuccessful, candidate for the Democratic nomination for president in 1972; he later served as Secretary of State. The first appointee to the Cabinet was John Gronouski, chosen by John F. Kennedy as postmaster general 1963–65.

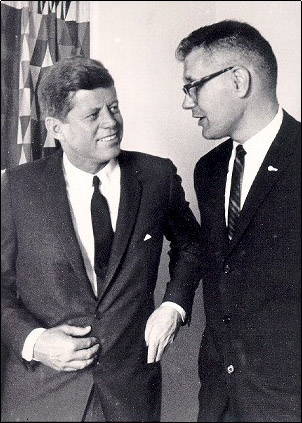
Rep. Dingell, right, with President Kennedy

By 1967, there were nine Polish Americans in Congress including four from the Chicago area. The three best known were Democrats who specialized in foreign policy, taxes and environmentalism. Clement J. Zablocki of Milwaukee served 1949–83, and became chairman of the House Foreign Affairs Committee from 1977 until his death in 1983; although liberal on domestic issues, he was a hawk regarding the Vietnam War. Dan Rostenkowski served 1959–95, and became chair of the powerful House Ways and Means Committee, which writes the tax laws. His father was an influential alderman and party leader from the center of Polonia on the Northwest side of Chicago. Even more influential has been John Dingell of Detroit, who was first elected to Congress in 1955 and served until 2015 (with the second longest tenure on record). A liberal Democrat known for hard-hitting investigations, Dingell was a major voice in economic, energy, medical and environmental issues. His father John D. Dingell, Sr. held the same seat in Congress from 1933 to 1955. He was the son of Marie and Joseph A. Dzieglewicz, Polish immigrants.

Historian Karen Aroian has identified a bump in Polish immigration in the 1960s and 1970s as the "Third Wave". Poland was liberalized during the Gierek era when emigration was loosened, and U.S. immigration policy remained relatively kind to Poles. Interviews with immigrants from this wave found that they were consistently shocked at how important materialism and careerism was in the United States. Compared to Poland, as they experienced it, the United States had a very meager social welfare system and neighbors did not recognize the neighborly system of favors and bartering common in Poland. Polish immigrants saw a major difference in the variety of consumer goods in America, whereas in Poland shopping for consumer goods was less a luxury and more a means of survival. Aroian identifies his interviewees may have been skewed by the relatively recent immigrant status of his subjects, as every immigrant faces some setbacks in social standing when entering a new country.

=== 1960s and 1970s ===
==== Polish and black relations ====
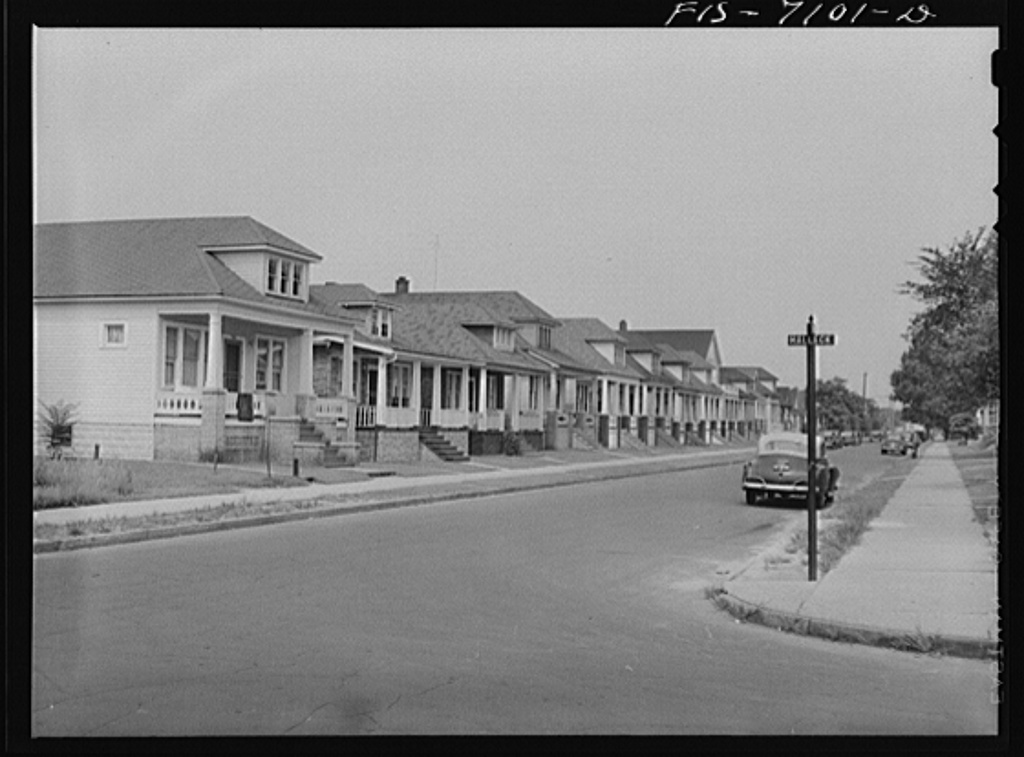
Homes in the Polish district, Detroit. 1942

Polish Americans settled in Detroit's east side. The name "Poletown" was first used to describe the community in 1872, where there was a high number of Polish residents and businesses. During the 1960s, the black population of Detroit increased by 98,000, while 386,000 whites had left the city. Polish Americans, were among the last white ethnic groups to remain in the city as its demographics changed into a Black enclave, as their community had invested millions of dollars in their churches and parochial schools, and World War I drives drained their savings (the Polish National Fund alone received $5,187,000 by 1920). Additional savings were given to family and friends from Poland, where many immigrants and their children sent back money.

In Chicago and in other northern cities, historian Joseph Parot observed real estate agents pressing white couples to move to the suburbs while encouraging black ones to move into Polish ethnic communities. Parot found that housing patterns commonly showed white ethnics such as Poles and Italians were used as "buffer zones" between black and white areas in multiple cities. With the sharp increase in Detroit's black population, racial tension between Polish and Black Americans grew. In the mid-1960s, the few Polish American protests against the disintegration of their ethnic communities were portrayed in the media as "racist". Poles were not cooperative with government incursions into their neighborhoods; in Pittsburgh's Model Cities Program, tax money paid by the residents was used to tear down blocks of a Polish community to build low income housing for blacks and Hispanics. In the predominantly Polish Catholic parish of St. Thaddeus, parishioners were demoralized by orders made from the Archdiocese of Detroit mandating that a percentage of proceeds from church events go to serve low-income black parishes. Many Polish Americans were forced out by the construction of freeways, public housing, and industrial complexes. More than 25% of Hamtramck's population was displaced by the building of Interstate-75. Poles saw their communities disintegrate. As the black population of Detroit grew, many also saw their longtime neighbors partake in white flight:

Having lived here since her exodus from Poland at age fourteen, my grandmother is bombarded daily with phone calls from high-pressure realtors who tell her she better hurry and sell before "they" all move in and the house becomes worthless. The pitch has succeeded all too well with others and occasionally she admits that "maybe it would be better"...I become angry at those who flee because of fear, bigotry or ignorance. It seems people keep pushing farther and farther out of the city all the white saying it isn't worth their help. I became angry at those who remain and have lost the hope that is so vital for a neighborhood's survival. Many talk of getting out, of biding their time, while ignoring the garbage strewn in the alley behind their houses. Have we become so service oriented that we won't pick up an old tire laying in the street because it's "the city's job: it's not my property?"

According to Polish historian Joseph Wytrwal, Poles in Chicago were against the open housing efforts of Martin Luther King, Jr., who encouraged black integration into Polish urban communities. The racial tensions caused by integration efforts led to violent riots between Polish and Black communities in 1966 and 1967, particularly in Detroit. In 1968, the act of a local president of the Chicago Polish Homeowner's Association raising a flag from half-mast to full-mast on the day of MLK's death nearly sparked one such riot. Polish American Roman Gribbs, who served as Detroit's mayor, believed the city's white flight and subsequent decline happened due to fears of similar violence. In his interview with the Dome magazine, he stated, “I knew that what I had to do to prevent that was bring the black community into the city administration.”

In 1975, the Detroit Polish community was distraught by the murder of Marian Pyszko, a World War II veteran and 6-year concentration camp survivor who was killed by three African American youths, who themselves were avenging the shooting of their friend (said to be accidental by Pyszko). Pyszko was sentenced to 3 years for reckless use of a firearm; the three youths who killed him, however, were acquitted of all charges by the jury. The jurors argued that the black riot was greater than the 3 boys (roughly 700 people were in the Livernois–Fenkell riot where Pyszko was targeted) and there was insufficient evidence to convict the youths alone - the Polish community, however, believed this to be an instant of bias, which further propelled anti-black sentiment.

As late at 1970, Hamtramck and Warren, Michigan, were highly Polish. The communities (and counterparts in Polish Chicago areas) rapidly changed into naturally occurring retirement communities where young families and single adults fled and left the elderly alone. Many of the elder Polish Americans suffered a loss of control over their daily lives, as many lost the assistance of their children who moved away and had a shrinking community to associate with for necessary help and service. Many withdrew from public life and descended into private consumption and activities to occupy their time. Depression, isolation, and loneliness increased in many of Detroit's Poles. The Hamtramck neighborhood used to be inhabited chiefly by Polish immigrants and their children until most moved to Warren, north of Detroit. Homes left behind were old and expensive to maintain. Many homes fell into disrepair and neglect, litter grew, and children's playgrounds were deserted.

==== Polish jokes ====
While race relations between white and black populations were still generally poor, through the progress of the Civil Rights Movement, anti-Black discrimination began to be seen as highly offensive within more socially conscious circles. Anti-Polish discrimination, however was not given the same treatment or legal safeguards, as it was not based on race but, rather, ethnicity. Within jokes, some people began replacing the word "black" or "nigger" with "Polack"; as an example, historian Bukowczyk heard a student in Detroit tell this "joke":

Question: How can you tell the difference between a dog and a Polack who have been run over by a car?
Answer: For the Polack, there won't be any skid marks.

When he questioned the student why she told this Polish joke, she said it was originally a black joke, but the word "nigger" was replaced by "Polack" because she did not want to be "prejudiced".

Polish jokes were everywhere in the 1960s and 1970s. In the late '60s, a book of Polish jokes was published and copyrighted, and commercial goods, gift cards, and merchandise followed that profited at the expense of Poles. Polish stereotyping was deeply pervasive in America and assimilation, upward mobility, higher education, and even intermarriage did not solve the problem. In 1985, Bukowczyk recalled meeting a college student from largely Polish Detroit, Michigan who lived in a home where her Irish-American mother would sometimes call her Polish-American father a "dumb Polack." Polish Americans were ashamed of their identities, and thousands changed their names to fit into American society. The American media spread an image of the Polish male as a "jock", typically large, strong, and tough athletically, but lacking in intelligence.

Thomas Tarapacki theorized that the prominence and high visibility of Polish Americans in sports during the postwar era contributed to the Polish jokes of the 1960s and 70s. Although Poles were succeeding in all types of sports, including tennis and golf, they came to dominate football in high numbers beginning in the 1930s and 40s. Blue collar, working class Americans repeatedly saw their favorite team rosters filled with Polish names and began to closely identify the two. Poles in many regards were proud of Polish American successes in American sports, and a Hall of Fame was constructed to celebrate their successes. However, by the 1960s, Tarapacki argues, Polish Americans struggled to combat the "jock" image because there had not been national recognition of successes in other fields other than athletics.

==== Polish surnames in America ====
Polish Americans often downplayed their ethnicity and changed their names to fit into American society. During the late 19th and early 20th centuries, name changes were commonly done by immigration agents at Ellis Island. An example of this is in the family of Edmund Muskie, whose Polish surname was Marciszewski. During the 1960s and 1970s, an unprecedented number of Poles voluntarily chose to Anglicize their own names. In Detroit alone, over 3,000 of the areas' 300,000 Polish Americans changed their names every year during the 1960s. Americans took no effort to respect or learn the pronunciation of Polish last names, and Poles who made it to positions of public visibility were told to Anglicize their own names. Many people, according to linguist John M. Lipski, "are convinced that all Polish names end in -ski and contain difficult consonant clusters." Although "very little is known about the psychological parameters," Lipski speculates about reasons for mispronunciation; for example, he found that English speakers consistently mispronounced his two syllable surname, Lipski, (Note: Lipski points out that his surname "is pronounced exactly as it is spelled," i.e. US: /ˈlɪpski/.) because, he speculates, an emotion based "inherent ethnolinguistic 'filtering mechanism' rejects" a simple two-syllable sequence when there is an expectation that all Polish names are "unpronounceable." In areas with no significant Slavic populations such as Houston, Texas, Lipski found mispronunciations were nonexistent. Lipski experienced mispronunciations often in Toledo, Ohio, and Alberta, Canada, where there were greater Slavic populations, which he believed was an example of unconscious prejudice. With little tolerance for learning and appreciating Polish last names, Americans viewed Poles who refused to change their names as unassimilable greenhorns. Even more common, Polish American children quickly changed their first names to American versions (Mateusz to Matthew, Czeslaw to Chester, Elzbieta to Elizabeth, Piotr to Peter). A 1963 study based on probate court records of 2,513 Polish Americans who voluntarily changed their last names share a pattern; over 62% changed their names entirely from the original to one with no resemblance to the Polish origin (examples include: Czarnecki to Scott, Borkowski to Nelson, and Kopacz to Woods). The second-most common choice was to subtract the Polish-sounding ending (ex: Ewanowski to Evans, Adamski to Adams, Dobrogowski to Dobro), often with an Anglicized addition (Falkowski to Falkner, Barzyk to Barr). These subtractions and Anglicized combinations were roughly 30% of cases. It was very rare for a name to be shortened with a Polish-sounding ending (ex: Niewodomski to Domski, Karpinski to Pinski, Olejarz to Jarz), as such examples accounted for less than .3% of cases.

==== Polish pride ====
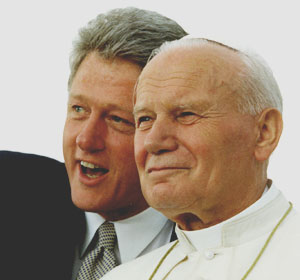
Pope John Paul II with President Clinton, 1993. The status of Poles across the world was elevated by his election to the papacy

During the 1970s, Polish Americans began to take pride in their ethnicity and identified with their Polish roots. Pins and T-shirts reading "Kiss me I'm Polish" and "Polish Power" began selling in the 1960s, and Polish polka experienced a growing popularity. In 1972, 1.1 million more people reported Polish ethnicity to the U.S. Census Bureau than they had only 3 years earlier. Public figures began to express their Polish identity openly and several Poles who had often changed their names for career advancement in the past began to change their names back. The book Rise of the Unmeltable Ethnics (1971) explored the resurgence of white ethnic pride that happened in America at the time.

Polish Americans (and Poles around the world) were elated by the election of Pope John Paul II in 1978. Polish identity and ethnic pride grew as a result of his papacy. Polish Americans partied when he was elected Pope, and Poles worldwide were ecstatic to see him in person. John Paul II's charisma drew large crowds wherever he went, and American Catholics organized pilgrimages to see him in Rome and Poland. Polish pride reached a height unseen by generations of Polish Americans. Sociologist Eugene Obidinski said, "there is a feeling that one of our kind has made it. Practically every issue of the Polish American papers reminds us that we are in a new glorious age." Polish Americans had been doubly blessed during the election; reportedly, Polish American Cardinal John Krol had played kingmaker at the papal election, and Karol Wojtyla became the first Polish pope. John Paul II's wide popularity and political power gave him soft power crucial to Poland's Solidarity movement. His visit to Poland and open support for the Solidarity movement is credited for bringing a swift end to communism in 1981, as well as the subsequent fall of the Iron Curtain. John Paul II's theology was staunchly conservative on social and sexual issues, and though popular as a religious and political figure, church attendance among Polish Americans did slowly decline during his papacy. John Paul II used his influence with the Polish American faithful to reconnect with the Polish National Catholic Church, and won some supporters back to the Catholic Church. John Paul II reversed the nearly 100-year excommunication of Francis Hodur and affirmed that those who received sacraments at the National Church were receiving the valid Eucharist. In turn, Prime Bishop Robert M. Nemkovich attended the funeral of John Paul II in 2005. John Paul II remains a popular figure for Polish Americans, and American politicians and religious leaders have invoked his memory to build cultural connection.

==== Civil rights ====
Polish Americans found that they were not protected by the United States courts system in defending their own civil rights. The Civil Rights Act of 1964 Title VII states: "No person in the United States shall on the grounds of race, color, or national origins, be excluded from participation in, or denied the benefits of, or be subjected to discrimination." In Budinsky v. Corning Glass Works, an employee of Slavic origin was fired after 14 years for speaking up about name-calling and anti-Slavic discrimination by his supervisors. The judge ruled that the statute did not extend beyond "race" and the employment discrimination suit was dismissed because he was therefore not part of a protected class. In the District of Columbia, Kurylas v. U.S. Department of Agriculture, a Polish American bringing suit over equal opportunity employment was told by the court that his case was invalid, as "only nonwhites have standing to bring an action". Poles were also snubbed by the destruction of their Poletown East, Detroit, community in 1981, when eminent domain by corporations triumphed against them in court and displaced their historic town. Aloysius Mazewski of the Polish American Congress felt that Poles were overlooked by the eminent domain and corporate personhood changes to U.S. law, arguing for a change in laws so that "groups as well as individuals" could launch anti-defamation lawsuits and confront civil rights charges. Senator Barbara Mikulski supported such a measure, although no movement has been successful in this issue of amending law for ethnic groups not recognized as racial minorities.

=== 1980s and Poland's liberation ===
U.S. President Ronald Reagan and Pope John Paul II placed great pressure on the Soviet Union in the 1980s, leading to Poland's independence. Reagan supported Poland's independence by actively protesting against martial law. He urged Americans to light candles for Poland to show support for their freedoms which were being repressed by communist rule. In 1982, Reagan met with leaders from western Europe to push for economic sanctions on the Soviet Union in return for liberalizing Poland. Reportedly, European leaders were wary of Russia and sought to practice an ongoing detente, but Reagan pressed firmly for punitive measures against the USSR. The public image of the Polish suffering in an economically and politically backward state hurt the Soviets' image abroad; to change public perception, the Soviets granted amnesty to several Polish prisoners and gave a one-time economic stimulus to boost the Polish economy. George H. W. Bush met with Solidarity leaders in Poland beginning in 1987 as vice president. On April 17, 1989, Bush, in his first foreign policy address as president, announced his economic policy toward Poland, offering money in return for political liberation in the communist regime. The address venue, Hamtramck, was chosen because it had a large Polish American population. (Note: According to Maynard (2008, p. 20), Bush's foreign policy address at Hamtramck "was an easily forgettable event" because "reporters simply refused to believe that Bush would make any important announcements" there.) Banners at the event included Solidarność signs and a backdrop of "Hamtramck: a touch of Europe in America". Bush's announcement was politically risky because it promised trade and financial credit during a tight U.S. budget, and for placing the White House, and not the State Department, as the key decision maker on foreign diplomacy. Bush's original aid plan was a modest stimulus package estimated at $2–20 million, but by 1990, the United States and allies granted Poland a package of $1 billion to revitalize its newly capitalist market. The U.S. Ambassador in Poland John R. Davis found that Bush's speech was closely watched in Poland and Poles were eagerly awaiting follow-up on his speech. Davis predicted that the July 1989 visit by Bush to Poland "will be an action-forcing event for the Polish leadership" and could radically change their government. In Poland, Davis assessed that, "the U.S. occupies such an exaggerated place of honor in the minds of most Poles that it goes beyond rational description." The perception of the U.S., according to Davis, was partially "derive[d] from [the] economic prosperity and lifestyle, enjoyed by 10 million Polish-Americans and envied by their siblings and cousins left behind."

==== Wave of immigration (1989–present) ====
Polish immigration to the United States experienced a small wave in the years following 1989. Specifically, the fall of the Berlin Wall and the subsequent fall of Soviet control freed emigration from Poland. A pent-up demand of Poles who previously were not allowed to emigrate was satisfied, and many left for Germany or America. The United States Immigration Act of 1990 admitted immigrants from 34 countries adversely affected by a previous piece of immigration legislation; in 1992, when the Act was implemented, over a third of Polish immigrants were approved under this measure. The most popular destination for Polish immigrants following 1989 was Chicago, followed by New York City. This was the oldest cohort of immigrants from Poland, averaging 29.3 years in 1992.

== In American media ==
American media depictions of Poles have been historically negative. Fictional Polish-Americans include Barney Gumble, Moe Szyslak, Banacek, Ernst Stavro Blofeld, Brock Samson, Walt Kowalski of Gran Torino, The Big Lebowski, and Polish Wedding. Polish characters tend to be brutish and ignorant, and are frequently the butt of jokes in the pecking order of the show. In the series Banacek, the main character was described as "not only a rugged insurance sleuth but also a walking lightning rod for Polish jokes." In the 1961 film West Side Story, the character Chino takes issue with the caucasian Tony, who is of mixed Polish and Swedish heritage, and has a line in which he said, "If it's the last thing I do, I'm gonna kill that Polack!" The slurring of Tony's ancestry is unique in that none of the other white ancestries are targeted. Folklorist Mac E. Barrick observed that TV comedians were reluctant to tell ethnic jokes until Spiro Agnew's "polack jokes" in 1968, pointing to an early Polish joke told by comedian Bob Hope in 1968, referencing politicians. Barrick stated that "even though the Polack joke usually lacks the bitterness found in racial humor, it deals deliberately with a very small minority group, one not involved in national controversy, and one that has no influential organization for picketing or protesting." During the 1960s and 1970s, there was a revived expression of white ethnicity in American culture. The popular 1970s sitcom Barney Miller depicted Polish-American character Sergeant Wojohowicz as uneducated and mentally slow. Among the worst offenders was the popular 1970s sitcom All in the Family, where protagonist Archie Bunker routinely called his son-in-law a "dumb Polack". The desensitization that was caused by the hateful language in All in the Family created a mainstream acceptance of the jokes, and the word Polack. Sociologist Barbara Ehrenreich called the show "the longest-running Polish joke." In the series Coach, character Dauber Dybinski played the "big, dumb hulk of a player" role for nine series, and a spin-off character George Dubcek (also with a Polish name) in Teech displayed the "burly but dumb son of a former football player". In the movie The End, lead supporting actor Marlon Burunki is depicted as an oafish and schizophrenic Polish-American in a mental institution. The term Polack was so pervasive in American society through the 1960s and 1970s that high-ranking U.S. politicians followed suit. In 1978, Senator Henry Jackson of Washington made Polish jokes at a banquet. Ronald Reagan told Polish jokes multiple times during his presidential campaign in 1980 and during his presidency. As late as 2008, Senator Arlen Specter of Pennsylvania told Polish jokes to an audience of Republican supporters. Reportedly an audience member interrupted him, saying, "Hey careful, I'm Polish", and Specter replied, "That's ok, I'll tell it more slowly." Mayor Marion Barry slurred Poles in 2012, and was apparently unaware the word "polacks" was inappropriate.

The Polish American community has pursued litigation to stop negative depictions of Poles in Hollywood, often to no avail. The Polish American Congress petitioned the Federal Communications Commission against American Broadcasting Company (ABC) "of a 'consistent policy' of portraying the 'dumb polack image'" and citing a 1972 episode of The Dick Cavett Show in which host Steve Allen in, and the next episode in which Allen's "alleged 'apology' was," according to the petition, "surrounded by a comic setting and was the basis for more demeaning humor." New York State's highest Appellate court, in State Division of Human Rights v. McHarris Gift Center (1980)., ruled that a gift shop was allowed to sell merchandise with "Polack jokes" on them; it was one vote short of making it illegal, based on public accommodations statutes citing the fact that Polish customers should be welcome and free from discrimination in the place of business. A lawsuit filed against Paramount Pictures in 1983 over "Polish jokes" in the movie Flashdance was thrown out of court, as the judge found "that 'the telling of Polish jokes does not attain that degree of outlandishness' to jeoparize Poles' employment and business opportunities."

== Contemporary ==
Polish Americans are largely assimilated to American society and personal connections to Poland and Polish culture are scarce. Of the 10 million Polish Americans, only about 4% are immigrants; the American-born Poles predominate. Among Poles of single ancestry, about 90% report living in a mixed-ethnic neighborhood, usually with other white ethnics. No congressional district or large city in the United States is predominantly Polish, although several Polish enclaves exist. Among American-born citizens of Polish ancestry, roughly 50% report eating Polish dishes, and many can name a variety of Polish foods unprompted. Whereas over 60% of Italian Americans reported eating Italian food at least once a week, less than 10% of Polish Americans ate Polish food once a week. This figure is still a higher occurrence than Irish Americans, who can only name a few traditional Irish foods (typically corned beef and cabbage), and only 30% report eating Irish food each year. Even fewer English, Dutch, and Scottish Americans can report that they eat ethnic cuisine regularly.

=== Growth of Polonia institutions ===
There has been growth in Polonia institutions in the early 21st century. The Piast Institute was founded in 2003 and remains the only Polish think tank in America. It has been recognized by the United States Census Bureau as an official Census Information Center, lending its historical information and policy information to interested Polish Americans. Poles in politics and public affairs have greater visibility and an avenue to address issues in the Polonia community through the American Polish Advisory Council. Both are secular institutions. Historically, Polish Americans linked their identity to the Catholic Church, and according to historian John Radzilowski, "Secular Polish Americanness has proved ephemeral and unsustainable over the generations", citing as evidence the decline of Polish parishes as reason for the decline in Polish American culture and language retention, since the parish served as an "incubator for both".

The first The Polish American encyclopedia was published in 2008, by James S. Pula. In 2009, the Pennsylvania state legislature voted and approved the first ever Polish American Heritage Month.

=== Anti-defamation efforts ===
Polish Americans continue to face discrimination and negative stereotyping in the United States. In February 2013, a YouTube video on Pączki Day made comments saying that on that day, "everybody is Polish, which means they are all fat and stupid." The Polish Consulate contacted the man who made the video and YouTube, urging it be taken down. It has since been taken off YouTube. Polish jokes by late night host Jimmy Kimmel were answered by a letter from the Polish American Congress in December 2013, urging Disney-ABC Television to discontinue ridiculing Poles as "stupid". On October 4, 2014, lawyers for Michael Jagodzinski, a mining foreman in West Virginia, announced a lawsuit against his former employer, Rhino Eastern, for discrimination based on national origin. Jagodzinski faced insults and taunts from the workers, who had written graffiti and called him a "dumb Polack", and was fired after raising the issue to management, who had refused to take any corrective measures to stop it. As part of a January 2016 settled consent decree, Jagodzinski will receive monetary relief.

The United States Geological Survey continues listing natural monuments and places with the name Polack. As of 2017, there are six topographic features and one locale with the name "Polack.

== Works cited ==
- Abernathy, Francis E. (2000). Built in Texas. Publications of the Texas Folklore Society. Vol. 42 (2nd ed.). University of North Texas Press. pp. 132–. ISBN 978-1-57441-092-1. ISSN 0082-3023.
- Alba, Richard D. (1990). Ethnic identity: the transformation of white America. Yale University Press. ISBN 978-0-300-05221-3.
- Allen, Debra (Spring 2000). "An unacknowledged consensus: Polish American views about the Oder-Niesse Line during the Truman Administration". Polish American Studies. 57 (1). Polish American Historical Association: 73–83. doi:10.2307/20148581. ISSN 0032-2806. JSTOR 20148581. S2CID 254437617.
- Andrews, Theodore (1953). The Polish National Catholic Church in America and Poland. London: Society for Promoting Christian Knowledge. OCLC 997124.
- Applebaum, Anne (2012). Iron curtain: the crushing of Eastern Europe, 1944–1956 (1st United States ed.). New York: Doubleday. ISBN 9780385515696.
- Armstrong, Jennifer (2000). Theodore Roosevelt: letters from a young coal miner (Novel). Winslow Press. ISBN 978-1-890817-27-5.
- Aroian, Karen J. (Autumn 1990). "Polish immigrants in the U.S.: adjusting to capitalism". Polish American Studies. 47 (2). Polish American Historical Association: 75–86. JSTOR 20148334.
- Bain, Donald (1978). Charlie and the Shawneetown Dame: love and madness in the Roaring Twenties, an incredible true story. Purdue University Press. ISBN 978-1-55753-375-3.
- Baker, T. Lindsay (1982). The Polish Texans. San Antonio: The University of Texas Institute of Texas Cultures-San Antonio.
- Baker, T. Lindsay (1996) [©1979]. "The Significance of the Silesians in Texas". The first Polish Americans: Silesian settlements in Texas. College Station, TX: Texas A&M University Press. ISBN 978-0-89096-725-6.
- Barbour, Philip L. (January 1964). "The identity of the first Poles in America". The William and Mary Quarterly. 21 (1): 77–92. doi:10.2307/1923357. JSTOR 1923357.
- Barrick, Mac E. (1997). "Racial riddles and the Polack joke". In Boskin, Joseph (ed.). The Humor Prism in 20th Century American Society. Wayne State University Press. ISBN 978-0-8143-2597-1.
- Biskupski, Mieczysław B. (1999). "Canada and the creation of a Polish army, 1914–1918". The Polish Review. 44 (3). Polish Institute of Arts & Sciences of America: 339–380. ISSN 0032-2970. JSTOR 25779141.
- Bismarck, Otto von (January 28, 1886). Bismarck and the 'Polish Question' (Speech). Speech to the Lower House of the Prussian Parliament. Translated by Levy, Richard S. East Lansing, MI: Michigan State University. Archived from the original on December 5, 1998.
- Blejwas, Stanislaus A. (Autumn 1985). "Puritans and Poles: the New England literary image of the Polish peasant immigrant". Polish American Studies. 42 (2). Polish American Historical Association: 46–88. ISSN 0032-2806. JSTOR 20148179.
- Blejwas, Stanislaus A. (2001). "Muskie, Edmund Sixtus (1914–1996)". In Barkan, Elliott Robert (ed.). Making it in America: a sourcebook on eminent ethnic Americans. ABC-CLIO. p. 248. ISBN 978-1-57607-098-7.
- Borkowski, Thomas S. (January–June 1963). "Some pattern in Polish surname changes". Polish American Studies. 20 (1). Polish American Historical Association: 14–16. ISSN 0032-2806. JSTOR 20147629.
- Brigham, Carl C. (1923). A study of American intelligence. Princeton, NJ: Princeton University Press. pp. 122–123, 142, 146, 202. OCLC 62106653.
- Bukowczyk, John J. (1996). Polish Americans and Their History: Community, Culture, and Politics. Pittsburgh, Pa: University of Pittsburgh Press.
- Burton, William L. (1998). Melting pot soldiers: the Union's ethnic regiments. North's Civil War. Vol. 4 (2nd ed.). New York: Fordham University Press. ISBN 9780823218271.
- Cahan, Abraham (1896). Yekl: a tale of the New York Ghetto. New York: Appleton. OCLC 647091700.
- Carpenter, Niles (1927). Immigrants and their children, 1920: A study based on census statistics relative to the foreign born and the native white of foreign or mixed parentage. Govt. Print. Off. pp. 350–.
- Chmielewski, David Gwidon (Fall 2008). "Earliest Polish connections to America" (PDF). Alliance newsletter. Toledo, OH. pp. [4–5]. Archived (PDF) from the original on November 26, 2010.
- Cohen, Mark (February 15, 1992). "Churches reach across long divide". New York Times. New York.;
- Daniels, R. L. (March 1883). " 'Polanders' in Texas". Lippincott's Magazine of Popular Literature and Science. new series 5. Philadelphia, PA: J. B. Lippincott. OCLC 656599432.
- Davis, John R. (June 8, 1989). "Poland looks to President Bush" (PDF). Letter to James Baker. Embassy of the United States, Warsaw. p. 7, n. 13. Archived (PDF) from the original on March 8, 2016.
- Dickter, Adam (2008). "New York City". In Skolnik, Fred (ed.). Encyclopaedia Judaica (2nd ed.). Gale Group. Archived from the original on March 4, 2016 – via Jewish Virtual Library.
- Dyboski, Roman (1950). Krzyżanowski, Ludwik (ed.). Poland in world civilization. New York: J. M. Barrett. p. 50. OCLC 610185659.
- Erdmans, Mary P. (1998). Opposite Poles: immigrants and ethnics in Polish Chicago, 1976–1990. University Park, PA: Pennsylvania State University Press. ISBN 9780271017358.
- Fee, Elizabeth (1993). Baltimore book: new views of local history. Temple University Press. ISBN 978-1-56639-184-9.
- Galush, William J. (1999). Immigrant faith, American future: Poles and religion before World War II (PDF) (Speech). Occasional papers in Polish and Polish American studies. New Britain, CT: Central Connecticut State University. ISSN 1092-4280. Archived (PDF) from the original on February 23, 2016.
- Galush, William J. (Winter 2000). "What should Janek learn? Staffing and curriculum in Polish-American parochial schools, 1870–1940". History of Education Quarterly. 40 (4): 395–417. doi:10.2307/369723. JSTOR 369723. S2CID 144724376.
- Galush, William (Autumn 2006). "The unremembered movement: abstinence among Polish Americans". Polish American Studies. 63 (2). Polish American Historical Association: 13–22. doi:10.2307/20148751. ISSN 0032-2806. JSTOR 20148751. S2CID 254429243.
- Gardner, Martha (January 10, 2009). The Qualities of a Citizen: Women, Immigration, and Citizenship, 1870-1965. Princeton University Press. ISBN 978-1-4008-2657-5.
- Giergielewicz, Mieczysław (Spring 1971). "August Antoni Jakubowski and his 'Remembrances Of A Polish Exile' ". The Polish Review. 16 (2). Polish Institute of Arts & Sciences of America: 67–89. ISSN 0032-2970. JSTOR 25776975.
- Gieysztor, Aleksander; et al., eds. (1968). History of Poland. Translated by Cękalska, Krystyna; et al. Warsaw: Państwowe Wydawnictwo Naukowe.
- Golab, Caroline (1977). Immigrant destinations. Philadelphia: Temple University Press. ISBN 9780877221098.
- Gory, Duane E. (1995). "Polish immigration to America: before and after the fall of the Berlin Wall". The Polish Review. 40 (1). Polish Institute of Arts & Sciences of America: 73–79. ISSN 0032-2970. JSTOR 25778828.
- Grabowski, John J.; et al. (1976). Polish Americans and their communities of Cleveland. Cleveland ethnic heritage studies (Web ed. of 1976 print ed.). Cleveland, OH: Cleveland Memory Project of the Michael Schwartz Library, Cleveland State University. OCLC 15737117.
  Boberg, Alice; Wroblewski, Ralph. "Polish immigration to the United States". In Grabowski et al. (1976), pp. 76–150.
- Greene, Victor (1980). "Poles". In Thernstrom, Stephan; Orlov, Ann; Handlin, Oscar (eds.). Harvard Encyclopedia of American Ethnic groups. Cambridge, MA: Harvard University Press. pp. 787–803. ISBN 9780674375123.
- Griffin, Patrick; Horn, James; Radzilowski, John (January 27, 2007). "Global Jamestown and the Poles". withgoodreasonradio.org (Podcast). Charlottesville, VA: Virginia Foundation of the Humanities. Event occurs at 5:15. Archived from the original on February 22, 2014.Additional archives: mp3.
- Haiman, Miecislaus (January–June 1946). "The Polish American contribution to World War II". Polish American Studies. 3 (1/2). Polish American Historical Association: 35–37. ISSN 0032-2806. JSTOR 20147063.
- Hapak, Joseph T. (Summer 1991). "Selective service and Polish Army recruitment during World War I". Journal of American Ethnic History. 10 (4). Immigration & Ethnic History Society: 38–60. ISSN 0278-5927. JSTOR 27500870.
- Helmreich, William (1984). The things they say behind your back: stereotypes and the myths behind them. Transaction Publishers. ISBN 978-1-4128-3933-4.
- Hillstrom, Kevin; Hillstrom, Laurie Collier (2005). The Industrial Revolution in America: Iron and steel. ABC-CLIO. ISBN 978-1-85109-620-6.
- Hutchinson, Edward P. (1981). Legislative history of American immigration policy, 1798–1965. Philadelphia: University of Pennsylvania Press. ISBN 9780812277968.
- Illinois. Office of Inspector of Factories and Workshops (1896). "Child labor". Annual report of the factory inspectors of Illinois. Chicago: Office of Inspector of Factories and Workshops, State of Illinois. OCLC 745518138.
- Ingram, Scott; Asher, Robert (January 1, 2009). Polish Immigrants. Infobase Publishing. ISBN 978-1-4381-0363-1.
- Jacobson, Matthew Frye (1995). Special sorrows: the diasporic imagination of Irish, Polish, and Jewish immigrants in the United States. Cambridge, MA: Harvard University Press. ISBN 9780674831858.
- Jaroszyńska-Kirchmann, Anna D., ed. (2014). Letters from readers in the Polish American Press, 1902-1969: a corner for everybody. Translated by Zawistowski, Theodore L.; Jaroszyńska-Kirchmann, Anna D. Lanham, MD: Lexington Books. ISBN 9780739188729.
  - Gortych, J. "He does not believe in Prohibition". In Jaroszyńska-Kirchmann (2014), p. 265, Letter first published 1928-12-23 in the Polish-language weekly Ameryka-Echo.
- Jensen, Richard (December 22, 2004) [article published in print 2002]. " 'No Irish need apply': A myth of victimization". Journal of Social History. 36 (2) (slightly revised online ed.): 405–429. doi:10.1353/jsh.2003.0021. S2CID 145258998. Archived from the original on February 8, 2005.
- Kantowicz, Edward R. (1984). "Polish Chicago: survival through solidarity". In Holli, Melvin G.; Jones, Peter d'Alroy (eds.). Ethnic Chicago (Rev. and expanded ed.). Grand Rapids, MI: W. B. Eerdmans. pp. 214–238. ISBN 9780802819772.
- Kelley, Florence (November 1896). "The working boy". American Journal of Sociology. 2 (3). University of Chicago Press: 358–368. doi:10.1086/210622. ISSN 0002-9602. JSTOR 2761630. S2CID 44100543.
- Kivisto, Peter (1995). Americans all: race and ethnic relations in historical, structural, and comparative perspectives. Belmont, CA: Wadsworth. ISBN 9780534243661.
- Kochanski, Halik (2012). The Eagle unbowed: Poland and the Poles in the Second World War. Cambridge, MA: Harvard University Press. ISBN 9780674068148.
- Koed, Betty (January 28, 2013). "Dillingham Commission's ranking of immigrant groups affected U.S. policy for decades". All Things Considered (Interview). Interviewed by Audie Cornish. NPR.
- Kraitsir, Charles V. (1837). The Poles in the United States of America: preceded by the earliest history of the Slavonians, and by the history of Poland. Philadelphia: Kiderlen and Stollmeyer. OCLC 729643899.
- Krasowska, Constance (January–June 1955). "The Polish National Alliance and the liberation of Poland". Polish American Studies. 12 (1/2). Polish American Historical Association: 11–18. JSTOR 20147378.
- Kula, Witold; Assorodobraj-Kula, Nina; Kula, Marcin, eds. (1986). Writing home: immigrants in Brazil and the United States, 1890–1891. East European monographs. Vol. 210. Translated by Wtulich, Josephine. Boulder: East European Monographs. ISBN 9780880331074.
- Kuzniewski, Anthony J. (1980). Faith and fatherland: the Polish church war in Wisconsin, 1896–1918. Notre Dame studies in American Catholicism. Vol. 3. Notre Dame: University of Notre Dame Press. ISBN 9780268009489.
- Lerski, Jerzy Jan (1958). A Polish chapter in Jacksonian America: the United States and the Polish exiles of 1831. University of Wisconsin Press. ISBN 9780598177216.
- Lemire, Jonathan (July 31, 2012). "Mitt Romney praises Poland, Pope John Paul II, in bid to impress Polish-American voters". nydailynews.com. New York Daily News. Archived from the original on August 3, 2012.
- Lessenberry, Jack (December 30, 2011). "Roman Gribbs looks back". domemagazine.com. Archived from the original on March 4, 2012.
- Lieberson, Stanley (1980). A piece of the pie: blacks and white immigrants since 1880. Berkeley: University of California Press. ISBN 9780520041233.
- Lipski, John M. (Spring–Summer 1976). "Prejudice and pronunciation" (PDF). American Speech. 51 (1/2). Duke University Press: 109–118. doi:10.2307/455361. ISSN 0003-1283. JSTOR 455361. Archived (PDF) from the original on November 9, 2013 – via psu.edu.
- Lopata, Helena Znaniecka (1976). Polish Americans: status competition in an ethnic community. Ethnic groups in American life series. Englewood Cliffs, N.J.: Prentice-Hall. ISBN 978-0-13-686436-3. OCLC 1959615.
- Lopata, Helena Znaniecka; Erdmans, Mary Patrice (1994). Polish Americans (2nd, rev. ed.). New Brunswick, NJ: Transaction Publishers. ISBN 978-1-4128-3106-2.
- Lukas, Richard C. (1982). Bitter legacy: Polish–American relations in the wake of World War II. Lexington, KY: University Press of Kentucky. ISBN 978-0-8131-1460-6.
- Mach, Zdzislaw (1993). Symbols, Conflict and Identity: Essays in Political Anthropology. SUNY series in anthropological studies of contemporary issues. State University of New York Press. p. 248. ISBN 978-1-4384-1156-9.
- Madaj, Menceslaus J. (July–December 1968). "The Polish community: a ghetto?". Polish American Studies. 25 (2). Polish American Historical Association: 65–71, 125. ISSN 0032-2806. JSTOR 20147784.
- Maynard, Christopher (2008). Out of the shadow: George H. W. Bush and the end of the Cold War. Texas A&M University Press. pp. 19–20. ISBN 978-1-60344-039-4.
- McCook, Brian (2011). The borders of integration: Polish migrants in Germany and the United States, 1870-1924. Ohio University Press Polish and Polish-American studies series. Ohio University Press. ISBN 978-0-8214-1926-7.
- Nesterowicz, Stefan (1909). Notatki z podróży po Północnej i Środkowej Ameryce [Notes from travels through Northern and Middle America] (in Polish). Toledo, OH: A. A. Paryski. OCLC 607199786.
- Majewski, Karen (2003). Traitors and true Poles: narrating a Polish-American identity, 1880–1939. Ohio University Press Polish and Polish-American studies series. Athens, OH: Ohio University Press. ISBN 978-0-8214-1470-5.
- McMillan, Bill (June 9, 1974). "It's hard to watch your roots die". The Sunday News Magazine. p. 10.
- Meyer, Bill; et al. (May 1, 2011). "Pope Benedict XVI beatifies John Paul II before throng of 1.5 million". cleveland.com. Cleveland, OH. The Plain Dealer. Associated Press. Archived from the original on July 8, 2012.
- Milewski, Frank (December 20, 2013). "WWII and holocaust: just a big joke at Disney's ABC-TV". canadafreepress.com. Canada Free Press. Archived from the original on March 10, 2016.
- Miller, Eugene (Autumn 1976). "Leo Krzycki: Polish American labor leader". Polish American Studies. 33 (2). Polish American Historical Association: 52–64. ISSN 0032-2806. JSTOR 20147963.
- Mocha, Frank, ed. (1978). Poles in America: bicentennial essays. Stevens Point, WI: Worzalla. OCLC 651970888.
- Nemkovich, Robert M. (June 11, 2014). "Historical timeline of the PNCC" (PDF). pncc.org. Scranton, PA: Polish National Catholic Church. Archived (PDF) from the original on February 25, 2016.
- New York State Unit History Project (February 10, 2016). "58th Infantry Regiment, Civil War". dmna.ny.gov. Saratoga Springs, NY: New York Military Museum and Veterans Research Center. Archived from the original on March 22, 2016.
- Olechno-Huszcza, Gillian (Spring 1985). "Feliks Pawel Wierzbicki in California". Polish American Studies. 42 (1). Polish American Historical Association: 59–69. ISSN 0032-2806. JSTOR 20148167. PMID 11617923.
- Olson, Laura Katz (2001). Age through ethnic lenses: caring for the elderly in a multicultural society. Rowman & Littlefield. ISBN 978-0-7425-0114-0.
- Osada, Stanisław (1905). Historya Związku Narodowego Polskiego i rozwój ruchu narodowego Polskiego w Ameryce Północnej: w dwudziestą piątą rocznicę założenia Związku (in Polish). Chicago: Związek Narodowy Polski. OCLC 671679121.
- O'Toole, James (December 17, 2008). "Specter's ethnic jokes lay an egg". post-gazette.com. Pittsburgh: PG Publishing. Pittsburgh Post-Gazette. Archived from the original on January 4, 2015.
- Pacyga, Dominic (1991). Polish immigrants and industrial Chicago: workers on the South Side, 1880–1922. University of Chicago Press. ISBN 978-0-226-64424-0.
- Pacyga, Dominic A. (Fall 1996). "To live amongst others: Poles and their neighbors in industrial Chicago, 1865–1930". Journal of American Ethnic History. 16 (1). Immigration & Ethnic History Society: 55–73. ISSN 0278-5927. JSTOR 27502138.
- Pacyga, Dominic A. (1999). "Poles". In Barkan, Elliott Robert (ed.). A nation of peoples: A sourcebook on America's multicultural heritage. Westport, CN: Greenwood Press. pp. 428–45. ISBN 9780313299612.
- Pacyga, Dominic A. (2005). "Poles". In Grossman, James R.; et al. (eds.). Electronic Encyclopedia of Chicago. Chicago, IL: Chicago Historical Society. ISBN 9780226310152.
- Pienkos, Donald E. (1984). PNA: a centennial history of the Polish National Alliance of the United States of North America. East European monographs. Vol. 168. Boulder, CO: East European Monographs. ISBN 9780880330602.
- Pliska, Stanley R. (Summer 1965). "The 'Polish-American Army' 1917–1921". The Polish Review. 10 (3). Polish Institute of Arts & Sciences of America: 46–59. JSTOR 25776612.
- Plocheck, Robert (n.d.). "Polish Texans". texasalmanac.com. Texas State Historical Association. Archived from the original on February 28, 2011.
- Polzin, Theresita (1973). "Social and economic conditions". The Polish Americans: whence and whither. Pulaski, WI: Franciscan Publishers. OCLC 1187880. Figures from Wachtel, Karol (1944). Polonja w Ameryce: dzieje i dorobek (in Polish). Philadelphia: published by the author. p. 63. OCLC 558446328.
- Povich, Elaine S. (January 3, 1990). "Poles get $1 billion financial jump start". chicagotribune.com. Chicago Tribune. Archived from the original on December 12, 2013.
- Praszałowicz, Dorota (Summer 1994). "The cultural changes of Polish-American Parochial Schools in Milwaukee, 1866–1988". Journal of American Ethnic History. 13 (4). Immigration & Ethnic History Society: 23–45. ISSN 0278-5927. JSTOR 27501897.
- Pula, James S. (1995). Polish Americans: an ethnic community. Twayne's immigrant heritage of America series. New York: Twayne Publishers. ISBN 978-0-8057-8427-5.
- Pula, James S. (Fall 1996). "Image, status, mobility and integration in American society: the Polish experience". Journal of American Ethnic History. 16 (1). Immigration & Ethnic History Society: 74–95. ISSN 0278-5927. JSTOR 27502139.
- Pula, James S. (2008). "Fact vs. fiction: what do we really know about the Polish presence in early Jamestown?". The Polish Review. 53 (4): 477–493. ISSN 0032-2970. JSTOR 25779776.
- Pula, James S.; Biskupski, Mieczysław B., eds. (2011). The Polish American Encyclopedia. Jefferson, NC: McFarland. ISBN 978-0-7864-3308-7.
- Quintyn, Conrad B. (2010). The existence or non-existence of race?: forensic anthropology, population admixture, and the future of racial classification in the U.S. Youngstown, NY: Teneo Press. ISBN 9781934844991.
- Radzialowski, Thaddeus C. (1982). "Ethnic conflict and the Polish Americans of Detroit, 1921–42". In Renkiewicz, Frank (ed.). The Polish presence in Canada and America. Toronto: Multicultural History Society of Ontario. ISBN 9780919045132 – via Multicultural Canada.
- Radzilowski, John (Fall 2007). "Fecund newcomers or dying ethnics? Demographic approaches to the history of Polish and Italian immigrants and their children in the United States, 1880 to 1980". Journal of American Ethnic History. 27 (1). Immigration & Ethnic History Society: 60–74. doi:10.2307/40543255. ISSN 0278-5927. JSTOR 40543255. S2CID 254495521.
- Richmond, Yale (1995). From Da to Yes: Understanding the East Europeans. Yarmouth, Me: Intercultural Press. ISBN 978-1-877864-30-8. OCLC 32051226.
- Ridge, Martin (1981). The New Bilingualism: An American Dilemma : Proceedings of a Conference. Transaction Publishers. pp. 208–. ISBN 978-1-4128-3797-2.
- Roberts, Peter (1912). The new immigration: a study of the industrial and social life of southeastern Europeans in America. New York: Macmillan. hdl:2027/mdp.39015000626955. OCLC 613193266.
- Rosypal, Kathryn G. (c. 2000). "The first Polish Americans find hope in Texas". info-poland.buffalo.edu. The Story of Panna Maria, TX. Buffalo, NY: The Polish Academic Information Center, University at Buffalo. Archived from the original on August 18, 2006.
- Sadler, Charles (1977). " 'Pro-Soviet Polish-Americans': Oskar Lange and Russia's friends in the Polonia, 1941–1945". The Polish Review. 22 (4). Polish Institute of Arts & Sciences of America: 25–39. ISSN 0032-2970. JSTOR 25777517.
- Seidner, Stanley S. (1976). In quest of a cultural identity: an inquiry for the Polish community. ERIC: ED167674. OCLC 425945425.
- Seroczynski, Felix T. (1911). "Poles in the United States". In Herbermann, Charles (ed.). Catholic Encyclopedia. Vol. 12. New York: Robert Appleton Company.
- Simons, Thomas W. (1999). "American policy and the Polish road to 1989". The Polish Review. 44 (4). Polish Institute of Arts & Sciences of America: 401–405. JSTOR 25779150.
- Schwartzman, Paul (May 24, 2012). "Marion Barry commits new gaffe while apologizing to Asians". The Washington Post. Archived from the original on January 23, 2013.
- Sercombe, Charles (February 22, 2013). "Paczki Day parody draws outrage from Polish community". Hamtramck Review. Hamtramck MI: John Ulaj. p. 3. Archived from the original on March 2, 2013.
- Stacey, Judith (1996). In the Name of the Family: Rethinking Family Values in the Postmodern Age. Beacon Press. ISBN 978-0-8070-0433-3.
- Stec, Casimir (May 1946). The national orientation of the Poles in the United States, 1608–1930 (PDF) (M.A. thesis). Milwaukee, WI: Marquette University. OCLC 6613352. Archived (PDF) from the original on December 3, 2013.
- Storch, Randi (2004). "The United Packinghouse Workers of America, Civil Rights, and the Communist Party in Chicago". In Cherny, Robert W.; Issel, William; Taylor, Kieran Walsh (eds.). American labor and the Cold War: grassroots politics and postwar political culture. Rutgers University Press. ISBN 978-0-8135-3403-9.
- Swastek, Joseph (1944). "What is a Polish American?". Polish American Studies. 1. Polish American Historical Association: 34–44. JSTOR 20147024.
- Tarapacki, Thomas (2000). "Poles". In Kirsch, George B.; Harris, Othello; Nolte, Claire Elaine (eds.). Encyclopedia of Ethnicity and Sports in the United States. Greenwood Publishing Group. ISBN 978-0-313-29911-7.
- Thomas, William Isaac; Znaniecki, Florian Witold (1918–1920). The Polish Peasant in Europe and America: monograph of an immigrant group. Core historical literature of agriculture. Vol. 1–5. Boston: Richard G. Badger, the Gorham Press. OCLC 62106081.
- Tilly, Charles (1998). Durable inequality. The Irene Flecknoe Ross lecture series. Berkeley: University of California Press. ISBN 978-0-520-92422-2.
- Torpey, John (2005). "Passports and the development of immigration controls in the North Atlantic world during the long nineteenth century". In Fahrmeir, Andreas; Faron, Olivier; Weil, Patrick (eds.). Migration control in the North Atlantic world: the evolution of state practices in Europe and the United States from the French Revolution to the inter-war period. New York: Berghahn Books. ISBN 9781571818126.
- Tyson, Daniel (January 26, 2016). "Miner wins in discrimination suit against Rhino Energy". register-herald.com. Beckley, WV: Register-Herald Reporter.
- Ubriaco, Robert D. (Autumn 1994). "Bread and butter politics or foreign policy concerns? Class versus ethnicity in the midwestern Polish American community during the 1946 congressional elections". Polish American Studies. 51 (2). Polish American Historical Association: 5–32. ISSN 0032-2806. JSTOR 20148441.
- Urbanski, Adam (Autumn 1971). "Immigration restriction and the Polish American press: the response of Wiadomosci Codzienne, 1921–1924". Polish American Studies. 28 (2). Polish American Historical Association: 5–21. JSTOR 20147837.
- Urbanski, Michael T. (Spring 2007). "Money, war, and recruiting an army: the activities of Connecticut Polonia during World War I". Connecticut History. 46 (1). New Haven, CT: Association for the Study of Connecticut History: 45–69. doi:10.2307/44369758. ISSN 0884-7177. JSTOR 44369758. S2CID 254485891.
- Utley, Henry M.; Cutcheon, Byron M.; Burton, Clarence M. (1906). Michigan as a province, territory and state the twenty-sixth member of the federal Union. Vol. 4. New York: Publishing society of Michigan. OCLC 577096496.
- Volokh, Eugene (August 1992). "Freedom of Speech and Workplace Harassment". UCLA Law Review. 39. Los Angeles: 1791. ISSN 0041-5650. Archived from the original on December 17, 2005 – via Excerpted with substantial modifications by the author.
- Vorse, Mary H. (1938). "Rubber—the first C.I.O. strike". Labor's new millions. New York: Modern Age Books. OCLC 262829416.
- Vought, Hans P. (2004). The bully pulpit and the melting pot: American presidents and the immigrant, 1897-1933. Macon, GA: Mercer University Press. ISBN 9780865548879.
- Waldo, Arthur L. (July–December 1960). "Searching for Polish Jamestown sources". Polish American Studies. 17 (3/4). Polish American Historical Association: 105–114. ISSN 0032-2806. JSTOR 20147552.
- Walaszek, Adam (Spring 2007). "Images of neighbors and Poles in early 20th-century Polish American school books". Polish American Studies. 64 (1). Polish American Historical Association: 5–25. doi:10.2307/20148760. JSTOR 20148760. S2CID 254444322.
- Warne, Frank (1904). The Slav invasion and the Mine Workers: a study in immigration. Philadelphia: J. B. Lippincott. OCLC 669934364.
- Waugh, John (2010). The class of 1846: from West Point to Appomattox: Stonewall Jackson, George McClellan, and their brothers. Random House Digital, Inc. ISBN 978-0-307-77539-9.
- Wierzbicki, Felix P. (1849). California as it is, and as it may be, or, A guide to the gold region. San Francisco: Washington Bartlett. ISBN 9781508426417. OCLC 367897293.
- Wierzewski, Wojciech A. (October 21, 2006). "The Turbulent Life of Anthony Sadowski". poles.org. Cooper City, FL: Poles in America Foundation. Archived from the original on March 14, 2007. Translated from Wierzewski, Wojciech A. (October 8, 2006). "[s.n.]". Gazeta Polska (in Polish) ("Extra" supplement ed.). Warsaw, PL: Niezależne Wydawnictwo Polskie. pp. 40–41. ISSN 1230-4581.
- Winter, Nevin O. (1913). "The land and the people". Poland of to-day and yesterday: a review of its history, past and present, and of the causes which resulted in its partition, together with a survey of its social, political, and economic conditions to-day. Boston: L. C. Page. OCLC 297270814.
- Woofter, Thomas J. (1933). Races and ethnic groups in American life. Recent social trends in the United States. New York: McGraw-Hill. ISBN 9780598527592. OCLC 558148789.
- Wytrwal, Joseph A. (1969). Poles in American History and Tradition. Detroit: Endurance Press. OCLC 29523.
- Wytrwal, Joseph (1982). Polish-Black encounters: A history of Polish and Black relations in America since 1619. Detroit, MI: Endurance Press. OCLC 8367062.
- Zubrzycki, J. (March 1953). "Emigration from Poland in the nineteenth and twentieth centuries". Population Studies. 6 (3). Population Investigation Committee: 248–272. doi:10.2307/2172378. ISSN 0032-4728. JSTOR 2172378.
- Zych, Adam (2005). The living situation of elderly Americans of Polish descent in Chicago. Wrocław: Wydawnictwo Naukowe Dolnośląskiej Szkoły Wyższej Edukacji TWP. ISBN 978-83-89518-15-6. OCLC 169045072.
- "ABC sued over its Polish jokes". Pittsburgh Post-Gazette. Pittsburgh, PA. Associated Press. July 3, 1973. p. 3.
- "The team behind Archie Bunker & Co". Time magazine. September 25, 1972. Archived from the original on March 12, 2004.
- "Court urged to act on TV Polish jokes". The Milwaukee Journal. Milwaukee, WI. Los Angeles Times Service. October 28, 1975. p. 3.
- "Detained at Castle Garden". Brooklyn Daily Eagle. Brooklyn, NY. March 5, 1889. p. 6.
- "Halka and Jan of Warsaw". Honolulu Star Bulletin. Vol. 23, no. 7433 (2:30 ed.). Honolulu, Oahu, Territory of Hawaii. February 8, 1916. p. 2. ISSN 2326-1137.
- "Not like the real ghetto". The San Francisco call. July 26, 1896. p. 23. OCLC 183863481 – via Chronicling America.
- "Paderewski estate ruined - letter to pianist also tells of starvation of Polish people" (PDF). New York Times. October 17, 1915.
- "Poles repudiate Czolgosz" (PDF). The New York Times. September 9, 1901.
- "Priest's life threatened because he asked prayers for recovery of President M'Kinley". Bridgeport Herald. Vol. 9, no. 571. Bridgeport, CN. September 15, 1901. p. 10.
- "Reagan's Polish-Italian joke draws request for apology". Eugene Register-Guard. Eugene, OR. Associated Press. February 18, 1980. p. 6A.
- "Poles in the United States". Literary Digest. 60 (10). New York: Funk and Wagnalls. March 8, 1919. hdl:2027/mdp.39015028103904. OCLC 557561660.
- "Pope's election spurs pride". Reading Eagle. Reading, PA. Associated Press. June 10, 1979. p. 17.
- "Suit on ethnic jokes in a movie dismissed". New York Times. Associated Press. September 28, 1983.
- "What Woodrow Wilson thinks of our Italian, Polish, and Hungarian Citizens". The Day. New London, CT. October 31, 1912. ISSN 0744-0499.
- This article incorporates public domain material from F.P. Wierzbicki (1999). "California as it is & as it may be; or, A guide to the gold region". memory.loc.gov. California as I saw it: first-person narratives of California's early years, 1849-1900. Washington, DC: Library of Congress. LCCN 33021743. OCLC 9694563.
- This article incorporates public domain material from EEOC Sues Rhino Eastern for national origin discrimination and retaliation. Washington, DC: Equal Employment Opportunity Commission. September 30, 2014. Archived from the original on April 6, 2016.
- This article incorporates public domain material from Rhino Energy WV will pay $62,500 to settle EEOC national origin discrimination and retaliation suit: mining company fired Polish-American foreman because he complained about slurs and graffiti, federal agency charged. Washington, DC: Equal Employment Opportunity Commission. January 20, 2016. Archived from the original on April 5, 2016.
- This article incorporates public domain material from Gibson, Campbell; Lennon, Emily (March 9, 1999). "Table 6. Mother tongue of the foreign-born population: 1910 to 1940, 1960, and 1970". census.gov. Washington, DC: U.S. Census Bureau, Population Division.
- This article incorporates public domain material from "Language spoken at home by ability to speak english for the population 5 years and over". census.gov (database table). 2006–2010 American Community Survey 5-Year Estimates. United States Census Bureau.
- This article incorporates public domain material from "Language spoken at home by ability to speak english for the population 5 years and over". census.gov (database table). 2010–2014 American Community Survey 5-Year Estimates. United States Census Bureau.
- This article incorporates public domain material from Shin, Hyon B.; Kominski, Robert A. (2010). "Table 2. Languages spoken at home: 1980, 1990, 2000, and 2007". Language use in the United States: 2007. American Community Survey Reports. United States Census Bureau.
- This article incorporates public domain material from Molina, Ramiro (1999). Soil survey of Karnes County, Texas (PDF). Washington, DC: National Cooperative Soil Survey. OCLC 45996875. Archived from the original (PDF) on March 21, 2009.
- This article incorporates public domain material from Sign in English, German, Hungarian, Italian, Lithuanian, Czech, and Polish, Kempton, West Virginia (Photograph). U.S. Farm Security Administration/Office of War Information Collection. Photographed by Vachon, John. Washington, DC: Library of Congress Prints and Photographs Division. May 1939. LC-USF33-T01-001361-M4.
- This article incorporates text from this source, which is in the public domain: United States. Bureau of Labor (1913). Report on conditions of employment in the iron and steel industry in the United States. 62nd Congress, 1st session, Senate document 110, v. 3. Washington, DC: Government Printing Office. p. 205. OCLC 656630439.
- This article incorporates text from this source, which is in the public domain: United States. Bureau of Immigration (1911). Reports of the Immigration Commission. 61st Congress, 3rd session, Senate document 747, v. 12. Washington, DC: Government Printing Office.
- This article incorporates text from this source, which is in the public domain: United States. Bureau of Immigration (1914). Annual report of the Commissioner General of Immigration to the Secretary of Labor. Washington, DC: Government Printing Office. OCLC 786311461.
- Official Army Register of the Volunteer Force of the United States Army for the Years 1861, '62, '63, '64, '65. Part II: New York and New Jersey. Washington, D.C.: Adjutant General's Office. 1865. OCLC 686779.
- Partial chronology of the rebellion. Washington, DC: United States Department of War. Adjutant-General's Office. 1866. p. 62. OCLC 654568612.
