= James J. Horan =

Chief of the Chicago Fire Department (1906–1910)

- Horan at his desk in City Hall in 1910

Fire Marshal and Chief of Brigade, Chicago Fire Department
- In office 1906 – December 22, 1910
- Preceded by: John Campion
- Succeeded by: Charles Seyferlich

Personal details
- Born: May 29, 1859 Chicago, Illinois, United States
- Died: December 22, 1910 (aged 51) Union Stock Yards, Chicago, Illinois, United States
- Cause of death: Killed in the line of duty (wall collapse)
- Resting place: Calvary Catholic Cemetery, Evanston, Illinois
- Spouse(s): Katie A. Ryan (d. 1895); Margaret Ellen Mahoney (m. October 21, 1903)
- Children: 4

James J. Horan (May 29, 1859 – December 22, 1910), known as "Big Jim", was Fire Marshal and Chief of Brigade of the Chicago Fire Department from 1906 until his death in 1910.

== Early life ==
James J. Horan was born on May 29, 1859, in Chicago, Illinois. He was educated in the Chicago public schools. As a boy he ran after horse-drawn engines to neighborhood fires.

== Career ==
In 1881, Horan joined the Chicago Fire Department as a water supply driver at age 22. He was promoted through pipeman, lieutenant, captain, and assistant fire marshal, and was appointed chief in 1906.

As Third Assistant Fire Marshal, he was among the senior commanders at the Iroquois Theatre fire on December 30, 1903, which killed more than 600 people.

He succeeded Fire Marshal John Campion. Campion had followed William H. Musham, who succeeded Denis Swenie in 1901. Mayor Edward Dunne appointed Horan in 1906, when Horan was 47; Mayor Fred Busse reappointed him in 1907. He lived at 722 Ashland Avenue, near 12th Street (now Roosevelt Road).

Between 1906 and 1910 the department built firehouses and organized Engine Companies 101 through 117 and Truck Companies 30 through 34. An editorial in the Chicago Tribune called him an "implacable enemy of politics."

In November 1909, after a request from the state, Horan took eleven Chicago firefighters by train to the Cherry Mine disaster in Cherry, Illinois, with smoke helmets, hose, and chemical apparatus. The fire killed 259 miners. Twenty-one were found alive seven days after it started.

From 1904 to 1910 he asked the city for a high-pressure water system at the Union Stock Yards. Engineering studies supported the work; the City Council did not fund it. Some insurers refused coverage in the district or charged high premiums. On the morning of December 22, 1910, Horan addressed the Council on the same request. The Council adjourned without acting.

== Death ==
Around 4:00 a.m. on December 22, 1910, a watchman found a fire in the hide-room basement of Nelson Morris & Co.'s Beef Plant No. 7 in the Union Stock Yards. Freight cars on the siding blocked access. City hydrants had been turned down against freezing, and pressure was low. Horan arrived at 5:05 a.m. and took command at the east entrance, under a wooden loading canopy. Lieutenant Joseph Mackey, on the canopy, saw the east wall bow, shouted a warning, and jumped; about ten other men jumped with him. The wall then fell on the canopy.

Horan was killed at age 51, with twenty other Chicago firefighters and three packinghouse workers. The dead included Second Assistant Fire Marshal William J. Burroughs, Captain Patrick E. Collins, and Lieutenants Herman G. Brandenburg, Edward J. Danis, and William G. Sturm. Fifteen firefighters were injured. Command passed to First Assistant Chief Charles Seyferlich. Horan's body was recovered after seventeen hours. Chicago Fire Department historian Bill Cattorini later said he was found on his knees, arms folded, facing the ruins. Property damage was put at more than $1,250,000.

Mayor Busse called an emergency Council session and named a committee of fifteen aldermen for honors and relief. On December 26, 1910, a funeral procession went from Horan's Ashland Avenue home to Holy Name Cathedral, where Archbishop James Quigley said a Requiem Mass. Horan's white fire helmet was on the casket. Horan was buried at Calvary Catholic Cemetery in Evanston. The Chicago Tribune called the cortege a "civic pageant."

A public relief fund raised $211,000 for the families of the dead. Trustees first offered only the interest; the widows sued and obtained the principal.

== Personal life ==
Horan married Katie A. Ryan. She died on March 6, 1895, at age 35, and was buried at Calvary Cemetery. On October 21, 1903, he married Margaret Ellen Mahoney. He had four surviving children at his death. He was a Catholic and a member of the Knights of Columbus.

== Legacy ==
The Chicago History Museum holds two of Horan's leather helmets, including his white Fire Marshal helmet, donated by his widow in 1947. A portrait that hung in the office of Chicago White Sox owner Charles Comiskey passed to Horan's daughter Margaret Horan Conerty in 1931; a replica was donated to the Fire Museum of Greater Chicago in 2021. He is a subject of Matthew Drew's Shadows of Chicago (2014). His name is on the National Fallen Firefighters Foundation Roll of Honor. A bronze relief on the Union Stock Yards fire memorial at Exchange Avenue and Peoria Street shows him raising a bugle. He received five department honorable mentions for rescues.

== See also ==
- Chicago Union Stock Yards fire (1910)
- Line of duty death
