= Bibliography of Chicago history =

Bibliography of selected publications on the history of Chicago

This is a bibliography of selected publications on the history of Chicago.

For most topics, the easiest place to start is Janice L. Reiff, et al. eds. The Encyclopedia of Chicago (2004), which has thorough coverage by leading scholars in 1120pp of text and many illustrations. It does not include biographies. It is online free.

See also Frank Jewel, Annotated bibliography of Chicago history (Chicago Historical Society 1979; not online.

See also History of Chicago#Further reading

== Surveys ==
- Reiff, Janice L. Ann Durkin Keating and James R. Grossman, eds. The Encyclopedia of Chicago (2004) thorough coverage by scholars in 1120pp online free
- Abu-Lughod, Janet L. New York, Chicago, Los Angeles: America's Global Cities (U of Minnesota Press, 1999), Compares the three cities in terms of geography, economics and race from 1800 to 1990
- Andreas, A. T. History of Chicago. From the earliest period to the present time (1884) online v 1; online v 2; online v. 3
- Gustaitis, Joseph. Chicago's Greatest Year, 1893: The White City and the Birth of a Modern Metropolis (2013)
- Gustaitis, Joseph. Chicago Transformed: World War I and the Windy City (2016).
- Longstreet, Stephen. Chicago: An Intimate Portrait of People, Pleasures, and Power, 1860-1919. (1973). 547 pp. popular
- Miller, Donald L. City of the Century: The Epic of Chicago and the Making of America (1997), popular epic; [
- Pacyga, Dominic A. Chicago: A Biography (2011), 472pp; detailed history by a scholar, based on secondary sources.
- Pierce, Bessie Louise. A History of Chicago, Volume I: The Beginning of a City 1673-1848 (1937; excerpt and text search vol 1; Volume II: From Town to City 1848-1871 (1940); Volume III: The Rise of a Modern City, 1871-1893 (1957) (excerpt and text search vol 3; the major scholarly history
- Sawyers, June Skinner. Chicago Portraits (2nd ed. Northwestern University Press, 2012), 250 short biographies
- Spinney, Robert G. City of Big Shoulders: A History of Chicago (2000), popular epic;

== Geography, region, housing ==
- Bachin, Robin F., Building the South Side: Urban Space and Civic Culture in Chicago, 1890-1919. (2004). 434 pp.
- Barrett, Paul. The Automobile and Urban Transit: The Formation of Public Policy in Chicago, 1900-1930. (1983). 295 pp.
- Betancur, John J. "The Settlement Experience of Latinos in Chicago: Segregation, Speculation, and the Ecology Model." Social Forces 1996 74(4): 1299-1324. ISSN 0037-7732 Fulltext: Jstor
- Bigott, Joseph C. From Cottage to Bungalow: Houses and the Working Classes in Metropolitan Chicago, 1869-1929 (2001) excerpt and text search
- Bronsky, Eric, Neal Samors and Jennifer Samors. Downtown Chicago in Transition (2007) excerpt and text search
- Cronon, William. Nature's Metropolis: Chicago and the Great West. (1991). 530 pp. excerpt and text search
- Garb, Margaret. City of American Dreams: A History of Home Ownership and Housing Reform in Chicago, 1871-1919. (2005). 261 pp.
- Keating, Ann Durkin. Building Chicago: Suburban Developers and the Creation of a Divided Metropolis. (1988). 230 pp.
- Keating, Ann Durkin. "Chicagoland: More than the Sum of its Parts." Journal of Urban History 2004 30(2): 213-230. ISSN 0096-1442 Fulltext: Ebsco
- Mayer, Harold M., and Richard C. Wade. Chicago: Growth of a Metropolis (1969) 510pp
- Pacyga, Dominic A. and Skerrett, Ellen. Chicago: City of Neighborhoods. Histories and Tours. (1986). 582 pp.
- Randall, Gregory C. America's Original G.I. Town: Park Forest, Illinois. 2000. 236 pp.
- Venkatesh, Sudhir Alladi. American Project: The Rise and Fall of a Modern Ghetto, (2002), 360pp, on Robert Taylor Homes, a high rise public housing project with a negative reputation excerpt and text search
- WPA. Illinois: A Descriptive and Historical Guide (1939)

== Pre-1871 ==
- Fehrenbacher, Don E. Chicago Giant: A Biography of "Long John" Wentworth. (1957). 278 pp.
- Karamanski, Theodore J. Rally 'Round the Flag: Chicago and the Civil War. (1993). 292 pp.
- Pierce, Bessie Louise. A History of Chicago, Volume I: The Beginning of a City 1673-1848 (1937; reprint 2007); Volume II: From Town to City 1848-1871 (reprint 2007)
- Quaife, Milo Milton. Chicago and the Old Northwest, 1673-1835. (1913, reprint (2001). 480 pp.
- Joseph Sabin, ed. (1871). "Chicago". Bibliotheca Americana. Vol. 4. New York. OCLC 13972268.

== Politics ==
- Allswang, John. A House For All Peoples: Ethnic Politics In Chicago, 1890-1936. (1973). 213 pp.
- Barnard, Harry. "Eagle Forgotten": The Life of John Peter Altgeld (1938)
- Beito, David T. Taxpayers in Revolt: Tax Resistance during the Great Depression. (1989). 216 pp.
- Bennett, Larry. “The Mayor among His Peers: Interpreting Richard M. Daley.” in The City, Revisited: Urban Theory from Chicago, Los Angeles, and New York, edited by Dennis R. Judd and Dick Simpson, (University of Minnesota Press, 2011), pp. 242–72. online
- Biles, Roger. Richard J. Daley: Politics, Race, and the Governing of Chicago. (1995). 292 pp.
- Biles, Roger. Big City Boss in Depression and War: Mayor Edward J. Kelly of Chicago. (1984). 219 pp.
- Bramhall, F.D. (1914). "Chicago". In Andrew Cunningham McLaughlin and Albert Bushnell Hart (ed.). Cyclopedia of American Government. Vol. 1. D. Appleton and Company.
- Bukowski, Douglas. Big Bill Thompson, Chicago, and the Politics of Image. (1998). 273 pp. excerpt and text search
- Cohen, Adam, and Elizabeth Taylor. American Pharaoh: Mayor Richard J. Daley - His Battle for Chicago and the Nation. (2001). 614pp ISBN 0-316-83489-0 excerpt and text search
- Diamond, Andrew J. Chicago on the Make Power and Inequality in a Modern City (2017)
- Flanagan, Maureen A. Charter Reform in Chicago. (1987). 207 pp.
- Fuchs, Ester R. Mayors and Money: Fiscal Policy in New York and Chicago. (1992). 361 pp.
- Gottfried, Alex. Boss Cermak of Chicago: A study of political leadership (1962)
- Green, Paul M. and Holli, Melvin G., eds. The Mayors: The Chicago Political Tradition (1995)
- Green, Paul M. and Holli, Melvin G., eds. Restoration 1989: Chicago Elects a New Daley. (1991). 212 pp.
- Gosnell, Harold F. Machine Politics: Chicago Model (1937), classic statistical study
- Guterbock, Thomas M. Machine Politics in Transition: Party and Community in Chicago. (1980). 324 pp.
- Hartley, Robert E. Big Jim Thompson of Illinois (1979), governor 1980s
- Helgeson, Jeffrey. Crucibles of Black Empowerment: Chicago's Neighborhood Politics from the New Deal to Harold Washington (2014)
- Hogan, David John. Class and Reform: School and Society in Chicago, 1880-1930. (1985). 328 pp.
- Holli, Melvin G., and Jones, Peter d'A., eds. Biographical Dictionary of American Mayors, 1820-1980 (Greenwood Press, 1981) short scholarly biographies each of the city's mayors 1820 to 1980. online; see index at p. 408 for list.
- Jentz, John B. and Richard Schneirov. Chicago in the Age of Capital (2012) covers politics 1860 to 1880 excerpt and text search; 330pp
- Kantowicz, Edward R. Polish-American Politics in Chicago, 1888-1940. (1975). 260 pp.
- Kleppner, Paul. Chicago Divided: The Making of a Black Mayor. (1985). 313 pp.
- Littlewood, Thomas B. Horner of Illinois (1969), governor 1933-40
- Lydersen, Karl. Mayor 1%: Rahm Emanuel and the Rise of Chicago's 99% (2014)
- Mantler, Gordon K. The Multiracial Promise. Harold Washington's Chicago and the Democratic Struggle in Reagan's America (U of North Carolina Press, 2023)
- Materson, Lisa G. For the Freedom of Her Race: Black Women and Electoral Politics in Illinois, 1877-1932 (2009)
- Merriner, James L. Grafters and Goo Goos: Corruption and Reform in Chicago (Southern Illinois U. Press, 2004)
- Merriam, Charles Edward (1929). Chicago: A More Intimate View of Urban Politics. The Macmillan Company. Archived from the original on January 8, 2009 – via Questia.
- Miller, Kristie. Ruth Hanna Mccormick: A Life in Politics, 1880-1944 (1992)
- Miranda, Rowan A. "Post-Machine Regimes and the Growth of Government A Fiscal History of the City of Chicago, 1970-1990." Urban Affairs Review(1993) 28#3 pp: 397-422.
- Morton, Richard Allen. Justice and Humanity: Edward F. Dunne, Illinois Progressive (1997), 174pp Democrfatic mayor 1905-7 and governor 1913-17.
- Pacyga, Dominic A. Clout City: The Rise and Fall of the Chicago Political Machine (U of Chicago Press, 2025) online
- Peterson, Paul E. The Politics of School Reform, 1870-1940. (1985). 241 pp.
- Pinderhughes, Dianne M. Race and Ethnicity in Chicago Politics: A Reexamination of Pluralist Theory. (1987). 318 pp.
- Rakove, Milton. Don't Make No Waves...Don't Back No Losers: An Insiders' Analysis of the Daley Machine (1975_
- Rivlin, Gary. Fire on the Prairie: Chicago's Harold Washington and the Politics of Race. (1992). 426 pp.
- Schmidt, John R. "The Mayor Who Cleaned Up Chicago": A Political Biography of William E. Dever. (1989). 239 pp.
- Schneirov, Richard. Labor and Urban Politics: Class Conflict and the Origins of Modern Liberalism in Chicago, 1864-97. (1998). 390 pp. excerpt and text search
- Simpson, Dick (2001). Rogues, Rebels, and Rubber Stamps: The Politics of the Chicago City Council from 1863 to the Present. Archived from the original on October 20, 2012 – via Questia.
- Smith, Joan K. Ella Flagg Young: Portrait of a Leader. (1979). 272 pp.
- Spirou, Costas, and Dennis R. Judd. “Richard M. Daley’s Ambiguous Legacy.” in Building the City of Spectacle: Mayor Richard M. Daley and the Remaking of Chicago, (Cornell University Press, 2016), pp. 149–81. online
- Tarr, Joel Arthur (1971). A Study in Boss Politics: William Lorimer of Chicago. Archived from the original on October 20, 2012 – via Questia.
- Wendt, Lloyd, Herman Kogan, and Bette Jore. Big Bill of Chicago. (2005) ISBN 0-8101-2319-3, popular vio of mayor in 1920s

== Crime, law and disaster ==
- Adler, Jeffrey S. First in Violence, Deepest in Dirt: Homicide in Chicago, 1875-1920. (2006). 357 pp. excerpt and text search
- Adler, Jeffrey S. "'We've Got a Right to Fight; We're Married': Domestic Homicide in Chicago, 1875-1920." Journal of Interdisciplinary History 2003 34(1): 27-48. ISSN 0022-1953 Fulltext: Project MUSE
- Avrich, Paul. The Haymarket Tragedy (1984) excerpt and text search
- Bales, Richard F. The Great Chicago Fire and the Myth of Mrs. O'Leary's Cow. (2002). 338 pp.
- Brandt, Nat. Chicago Death Trap: The Iroquois Theatre Fire of 1903. (2003). 180 pp.
- Bruno, Robert. Reforming the Chicago Teamsters: The Story of Local 705. (2003). 203 pp.
- Cahan, Richard. A Court that Shaped America: Chicago's Federal District Court from Abe Lincoln to Abbie Hoffman. (2002). 273 pp.
- Chicago Commission on Race Relations. The Negro in Chicago: A Study of Race Relations and a Race Riot (1922) - 672 pages; full text online
- Cohen, Andrew Wender. The Racketeer's Progress: Chicago and the Struggle for the Modern American Economy, 1900-1940. (2004). 333 pp.
- Cooley, Will, "'Stones Run It': Taking Back Control of Organized Crime in Chicago, 1940–1975," Journal of Urban History, 37 (Nov. 2011), 933–51
- Getis, Victoria. The Juvenile Court and the Progressives. (2000). 216 pp.
- Farber, David. Chicago '68. (1988). 304 pp.
- Heinz, John P. and Laumann, Edward O. Chicago Lawyers: The Social Structure of the Bar. (1983). 496 pp.
- Hendershot, Heather. When the News Broke: Chicago 1968 and the Polarizing of America (University of Chicago Press, 2023) on riots in the national news.
- Higdon, Hal. Leopold and Loeb: The Crime of the Century. (1975). 380 pp.
- Hilton, George W. Eastland: Legacy of the Titanic. (1995). 364 pp. The cruise ship capsized at its pier on a calm day in 1915, killing over 800 passengers. It was top heavy because of new federal laws (passed in response to the Titanic) requiring lifeboats.
- Hoffman, Dennis E. Scarface Al and the Crime Crusaders: Chicago's Private War against Capone. (1993). 192 pp.
- Krist, Gary. City of Scoundrels: The 12 Days of Disaster that Gave Birth to Modern Chicago. (2012). 347 pp.
- Lindberg, Richard Carl. To Serve and Collect: Chicago Politics and Police Corruption from the Lager Beer Riot to the Summerdale Scandal: 1855-1960. 1991. ISBN 0-275-93415-2
- Merriner, James L. (2004). Grafters and Goo Goos: Corruption and Reform in Chicago, 1833-(2003). Archived from the original on October 11, 2008 – via Questia.
- Miller, Ross. The Great Chicago Fire (2000); 1st ed was American Apocalypse: The Great Chicago Fire and the Myth of Chicago 287 pp.
- Mumford, Kevin J. Interzones: Black/White Sex Districts in Chicago and New York in the Early Twentieth Century. (1997). 238 pp.
- Sawislak, Karen. Smoldering City: Chicagoans and the Great Fire, 1871-1874. (1995). 408 pp. excerpt and text search
- Tuttle, William M., Jr. Race Riot: Chicago in the Red Summer of 1919. (1970). 305 pp.
- Wendt, Lloyd, and Herman Kogan. Lords of the Levee. (1967), popular stories from early 20th century.
- Willrich, Michael. City of Courts: Socializing Justice in Progressive Era Chicago. (2003). 332 pp. excerpt and text search
- Wolcott, David B. Cops and Kids: Policing Juvenile Delinquency in Urban America, 1890-1940. (2005). 264 pp.

== Labor ==
- Bae, Youngsoo. Labor in Retreat: Class and Community among Men's Clothing Workers of Chicago, 1871-1929. (2001). 295 pp.
- Barrett, James. Work and Community in the Jungle: Chicago's Packinghouse Workers, 1894—1922 (1987), excerpt and text search
- Cohen, Lizabeth. Making a New Deal: Industrial Workers in Chicago, 1919-1939. (1990). 526 pp. excerpt and text search
- Cummings, John. "The Chicago Teamsters' Strike: A study in industrial democracy." Journal of Political Economy (1905) 13: 536-73. in jstor
- Fine, Lisa M. The Souls of the Skyscraper: Female Clerical Workers in Chicago, 1870-1930. (1990). 249 pp.
- Green, James. Death in the Haymarket: A Story of Chicago, the First Labor Movement and the Bombing that Divided Gilded Age America. (2006). 383 pp.
- Halpern, Rick. Down on the Killing Floor: Black and White Workers in Chicago's Packinghouses, 1904-1954. (1997). 309 pp. excerpt and text search
- Hogan, John F. The 1937 Chicago Steel Strike: Blood on the Prairie (2014)
- Meyerowitz, Joanne J. Women Adrift: Independent Wage Earners in Chicago, 1880-1930. (1988). 224 pp. excerpt and text search
- Newell, Barbara Wayne. Chicago and the Labor Movement: Metropolitan Unionism in the 1930s (1961)
- Papke, David Ray. The Pullman Case: The Clash of Labor and Capital in Industrial America. (1999). 118 pp. legal aspects
- Schneirov, Richard; Stromquist, Shelton; and Salvatore, Nick, eds. The Pullman Strike and the Crisis of the 1890s: Essays on Labor and Politics. (1999). 258 pp. excerpt and text search
- Schneirov, Richard and Suhrbur, Thomas J. Union Brotherhood, Union Town: A History of the Carpenters' Union of Chicago, 1863-1987. (1988). 211 pp.

== Business and economics ==
- Ascoli, Peter Max. Julius Rosenwald: The Man Who Built Sears, Roebuck and Advanced the Cause of Black Education in the American South (2006) excerpt and text search
- Clavel, Pierre, and Robert Giloth, "Planning for Manufacturing: Chicago After 1983," Journal of Planning History, 14#1 (Feb. 2015) pp: 19-37.
- Doussard, Marc; Peck, Jamie; Theodore, Nik. "After Deindustrialization: Uneven Growth and Economic Inequality in 'Postindustrial' Chicago" Economic Geography (2009) 85#2 pp 183–207.
- Filipe Campante; Edward Glaeser (2009), Yet Another Tale of Two Cities: Buenos Aires and Chicago, Cambridge, Massachusetts: National Bureau of Economic Research
- Emmet, Boris, and John E. Jeuck. Catalogues and Counters: A History of Sears, Roebuck & Company (1965), the standard corporate history
- Ferris, William G. The Grain Traders: The Story of the Chicago Board of Trade. (1988). 221 pp.
- Franch, John. Robber Baron: The Life of Charles Tyson Yerkes. (2006). 374 pp.
- Hoyt, Homer. 1933. One Hundred Years of Land Values in Chicago. Chicago: The University of Chicago Press.
- McDonald, Forrest. Insull: The Rise and Fall of a Billionaire Utility Tycoon (2004)
- Rast, Joel. Remaking Chicago: The Political Origins of Urban Industrial Change. (1999). 220 pp. redevelopment of area near downtown
- Smith, Raymond D., and William P. Darrow. "Strategic Management and Entrepreneurial Opportunity: The Rise of Sears, Inc.," Journal of Business & Entrepreneurship (1999) 11#1
- Soloman, Brian, et al. Chicago: America's Railroad Capital: The Illustrated History, 1836 to Today (2014)
- Young, David M. The Iron Horse and the Windy City: How Railroads Shaped Chicago. (2005). 270 pp. popular
- Young, David M. Chicago Aviation: An Illustrated History. (2003). 254 pp. popular
- Young, David M. Chicago Transit: An Illustrated History. (1998). 213 pp. popular

== Environment ==
- Cain, Louis P. Sanitation Strategy for a Lakefront Metropolis: The Case of Chicago. (1978). 141 pp.
- Cain, Louis P. "Sanitation in Chicago: A Strategy for a Lakefront Metropolis," Encyclopedia of Chicago (2004) online
- Capano, Daniel E. "Chicago's War with Water." American Heritage of Invention & Technology 2003 18(4): 50–58. ISSN 8756-7296 full text online
- Cronon, William. Nature's Metropolis: Chicago and the Great West. (1991). 530 pp.
- Ferrie, Joseph P., & Werner Troesken. "Water and Chicago's mortality transition, 1850-1925." Explorations in Economic History (2008) 45#1 pp 1–16; economic analysis
- Klinenberg, Eric. Heat wave: A social autopsy of disaster in Chicago (2003) the 1995 disaster
- O'Connell, James C. Chicago's Quest for Pure Water. (1976).
- Pellow, David Naguib. Garbage Wars: The Struggle for Environmental Justice in Chicago. (2002). 234 pp.; 1940s-1990s
- Platt, Harold L. Shock Cities: The Environmental Transformation and Reform of Manchester and Chicago. (2005). 628 pp.
- Platt, Harold L. The Electric City: Energy and the Growth of the Chicago Area, 1880–1930. (1991). 318 pp. excerpt and text search
- Rosen, Christine Meisner. "Businessmen against pollution in late nineteenth century Chicago." Business History Review (1995) 69#3 pp: 351-397.

== High culture, architecture, science ==
- Achilles, Rolf. Chicago School of Architecture: Building the Modern City, 1880-1910 (2013)
- Bachin, Robin F., Building the South Side: Urban Space and Civic Culture in Chicago, 1890-1919. (2004). 434 pp.
- Bolotin, Norman and Laing, Christine. The World's Columbian Exposition: The Chicago World's Fair of 1893. (1992). 166 pp.
- Bonner, Thomas Neville. Medicine in Chicago, 1850-1950: A Chapter in the Social and Scientific Development of a City. ( 1957, 2d ed. 1991). 335 pp.
- Bruegmann, Robert. The Architects and the City: Holabird & Roche of Chicago, 1880-1918. (1997). 544 pp.
- Cappetti, Carla. Writing Chicago: Modernism, Ethnography, and the Novel. (1993). 274 pp.
- Christiansen, Richard. A Theater of Our Own: A History and a Memoir of 1,001 Nights in Chicago. (2004). 317 pp.
- Clarke, Jane H.; Saliga, Pauline A.; and Zukowsky, John. The Sky's the Limit: A Century of Chicago Skyscrapers. (1990). 304 pp.
- Condit, Carl W. Chicago, 1910-29: Building, Planning, and Urban Technology. (1973). 354 pp.
- Condit, Carl W. Chicago, 1930-70: Building, Planning, and Urban Technology. (1974). 351 pp.
- Garvey, Timothy J. Public Sculptor: Lorado Taft and the Beautification of Chicago. (1988). 222 pp.
- Gray, Mary Lackritz. A Guide to Chicago's Murals. (2001). 488 pp.
- Greenhouse, Wendy and Weininger, Susan. Chicago Painting 1895-1945: The Bridges Collection. (2004). 251 pp.
- Gustaitis, Joseph. Chicago's Greatest Year, 1893: The White City and the Birth of a Modern Metropolis (2013)
- Hallwas, John E. ed., Illinois Literature: The Nineteenth Century (1986)
- Harris, Neil. Chicago Apartments: A Century of Lakefront Luxury. (2004). 352 pp.
- Hines, Thomas S. Burnham of Chicago: Architect and Planner. (1974). 445 pp.
- Leslie, Thomas. Chicago Skyscrapers, 1871-1934 (2013)
- Longstreth, Richard, ed. The Charnley House: Louis Sullivan, Frank Lloyd Wright, and the Making of Chicago's Gold Coast. (2004). 249 pp.
- Lowe, David Garrard. Lost Chicago (2000), architectural landmarks that were torn down. excerpt and text search
- McCarthy, Kathleen D. Noblesse Oblige: Charity and Cultural Philanthropy in Chicago, 1849-1929. (1982). 230 pp.
- Moore, Michelle E. "Chicago and the Making of American Modernism: Cather, Hemingway, Faulkner, and Fitzgerald in Conflict." (2019). 264 pp.
- Moudry, Roberta, ed. The American Skyscraper: Cultural Histories. (2005). 281 pp.
- Saum, Lewis O. Eugene Field and His Age. (2001). 324 pp.
- Schaffer, Kristen. Daniel H. Burnham: Visionary Architect and Planner. (2003). 223 pp.
- Siry, Joseph M. The Chicago Auditorium Building: Adler and Sullivan's Architecture and the City. (2002). 550 pp.
- Siry, Joseph. Carson Pirie Scott: Louis Sullivan and the Chicago Department Store. (1989). 290 pp.
- Waldheim, Charles and Ray, Katerina Rüedi, eds. Chicago Architecture: Histories, Revisions, Alternatives. (2005). 488 pp.
- Wright, Gwendolyn. Moralism and the Model Home: Domestic Architecture and Cultural Conflict in Chicago, 1873-1913. (1980). 382 pp.
- Zukowsky, John, ed. Chicago Architecture and Design, 1923-1993: Reconfiguration of an American Metropolis. (1993). 479 pp.

== Black Chicago ==
- Best, Wallace D. Passionately Human, No Less Divine: Religion and Culture in Black Chicago, 1915-1952. (2005). 251 pp.
- Black, Timuel D., Jr. Bridges of Memory: Chicago's First Wave of Black Migration. (2003). 600 pp.
- Blakely, Robert J. Earl B. Dickerson: A Voice for Freedom and Equality. (2006). 270 pp.
- Chicago Commission on Race Relations. The Negro in Chicago: A Study of Race Relations and a Race Riot (1922) - 672 pages; full text online
- Drake, St. Clair, and Horace R. Cayton. Black Metropolis: A Study of Negro Life in a Northern City (4th ed. 1945), classic sociological study
- Grimshaw, William J. Bitter Fruit: Black Politics and the Chicago Machine, 1931-1991. (1992). 248 pp.
- Grossman, James R. Land of Hope: Chicago, Black Southerners, and the Great Migration. (1989). 384 pp.
- Hirsch, Arnold R. Making the Second Ghetto: Race and Housing in Chicago, 1940-60. (1983). 362 pp.
- Satter, Beryl. Family Properties: Race, Real Estate, and the Exploitation of Black Urban America. (2009). Covers contract buying, segregation, and exploitation in postwar Black Chicago.
- Keiser, Richard A. "Explaining African-American Political Empowerment Windy City Politics from 1900 to 1983." Urban Affairs Review (1993) 29#1 pp: 84-116.
- Knupfer, Anne Meis. The Chicago Black Renaissance and Women's Activism. (2006). 244 pp.
- Lemann, Nicholas. The Promised Land: The Great Black Migration and How It Changed America. (1991). 401 pp.
- Mantler, Gordon K. The Multiracial Promise. Harold Washington's Chicago and the Democratic Struggle in Reagan's America (U of North Carolina Press, 2023)
- Philpott, Thomas Lee. The Slum and the Ghetto: Immigrants, Blacks, and Reformers in Chicago, 1880-1930. (1978). 437 pp.
- Pinderhughes, Dianne M. Race and Ethnicity in Chicago Politics: A Reexamination of Pluralist Theory. (1987). 318 pp.
- Reed, Christopher Robert. Black Chicago's First Century. Vol. 1: 1833-1900. (2005). 582 pp.
- Reed, Christopher Robert (1997). The Chicago NAACP and the Rise of Black Professional Leadership, 1910-1966. Archived from the original on December 3, 2008 – via Questia.
- Rivlin, Gary. Fire on the Prairie: Chicago's Harold Washington and the Politics of Race. (1992). 426 pp.
- Spear, Allan. Black Chicago: The Making of a Negro Ghetto, 1890—1920 (1967),
- Strickland, Arvarh E. History of the Chicago Urban League. (1966, 2nd ed. (2001). 286 pp.
- Tuttle, William M., Jr. Race Riot: Chicago in the Red Summer of 1919. (1970). 305 pp.
- Venkatesh, Sudhir Alladi. American Project: The Rise and Fall of a Modern Ghetto, (2002), 360pp, on Robert Taylor Homes, a high rise public housing project with a negative reputation excerpt and text search
- Wellman, James K., Jr. The Gold Coast Church and the Ghetto: Christ and Culture in Mainline Protestantism. (1999). 241 pp.

== Schools ==
- Ashby, Steven K., and Robert Bruno. A Fight for the Soul of Public Education: The Story of the Chicago Teachers Strike (Cornell University Press, 2016). online
- Carl, Jim. " '‘Good Politics Is Good Government': The Troubling History of Mayoral Control of the Public Schools in Twentieth-Century Chicago." American Journal of Education 115#2, 2009, pp. 305–36. online
- Counts, George S. School and Society in Chicago (1928) online
- Danns, Dionne. "CHICAGO HIGH SCHOOL STUDENTS' MOVEMENT FOR QUALITY PUBLIC EDUCATION, 1966-1971" (PDF). Journal of African American History: 138–150.
- Herrick, Mary J. The Chicago schools: a social and political history (1971) online a major scholarly study.
- Karlin, Jewel. Chicago: backgrounds of education (1940).
- McManis, John T. Ella Flagg Young and a half-century of the Chicago public schools (1916) online
- Peterson, Paul E. School politics Chicago style (U of Chicago Press, 1976) online, a major scholarly study
- Shipps, Dorothy. “Updating Tradition: The Institutional Underpinnings of Modern Mayoral Control in Chicago’s Public Schools.” in When Mayors Take Charge: School Governance in the City, edited by Joseph P. Viteritti, (Brookings Institution Press, 2009), pp. 117–47. online
- Torre, Marisa de la and Julia Gwynne. "When Schools Close: Effects on Displaced Students in Chicago Public Schools." University of Chicago Consortium on School Research. October 2009. Information page.

=== Online reports and studies ===
- online

=== Primary sources ===
- Chicago Tribune. Chicago schools: 'worst in America': an examination of the public schools that fail Chicago (1988) online
- Bickford, Charles W. “Visiting Chicago Schools.—(I).” The Journal of Education, vol. 55, no. 21, 1902, pp. 327–28. online
  - “Visiting Chicago Schools.—(II).” The Journal of Education, vol. 55, no. 22, 1902, p. 344. online
- Havighurst, Robert J. The public schools of Chicago: a survey for the Board of Education of the City of Chicago (1964)
- Thompson, George J., et al. “Chicago Schools. In the Eyes of the Committee of the Federation of Labor.” The Journal of Education, vol. 55, no. 15, 1902, pp. 231–43. online

== Social, religious, and ethnic ==
- Anderson, Philip J. and Blanck, Dag, eds. Swedish-American Life in Chicago: Cultural and Urban Aspects of an Immigrant People, 1850-1930. (1992). 394 pp.
- Avella, Steven M. This Confident Church: Catholic Leadership and Life in Chicago, 1940-1965. (1992). 410 pp.
- Barrett, James. Work and Community in the Jungle: Chicago's Packinghouse Workers, 1894—1922 (1987), excerpt and text search
- Beijbom, Ulf. Swedes in Chicago: A Demographic and Social Study of the 1846-1880 Immigration. (1971). 381 pp
- Betancur, John J. "The Settlement Experience of Latinos in Chicago: Segregation, Speculation, and the Ecology Model." Social Forces 1996 74(4): 1299–1324. ISSN 0037-7732 Fulltext: Jstor
- Bowly Jr., Devereux The Poorhouse: Subsidized Housing in Chicago, 1895-1976 (1978) Bowly Jr.&dcontributors=Devereux+Bowly+Jr. online edition
- Candeloro, Dominic. Italians in Chicago. (1999). 128 pp.
- Cutler, Irving. The Jews of Chicago: From Shtetl to Suburb. (1996). 316 pp.
- Dahm, Charles and Ghelardi, Robert. Power and Authority in the Catholic Church: Cardinal Cody in Chicago. (1982). 334 pp.
- DeGenova, Nicholas. Working the Boundaries: Race, Space, and "Illegality" in Mexican Chicago. (2005). 329 pp.
- Duis, Perry R. Challenging Chicago: Coping with Everyday Life, 1837-1920. (1998). 430 pp. online review
- Duis, Perry R. The Saloon: Public Drinking in Chicago and Boston, 1880-1920 (1983).
- Erdmans, Mary Patrice. Opposite Poles: Immigrants and Ethnics in Polish Chicago, 1976-1990. (1998). 267 pp.
- Fernandez, Lilia. Brown in the Windy City: Mexicans and Puerto Ricans in Postwar Chicago (2014)
- Fuerst, J. S. and Hunt, D. Bradford, eds. When Public Housing Was Paradise: Building Community in Chicago. (2003) 228 pp.
- Green, Paul M., and Melvin G. Holli. Chicago, World War II (2003) excerpt and text search
- Greene, Victor. For God and Country: The Rise of Polish and Lithuanian Ethnic Consciousness in America, 1860-1910. (1975). 202 pp.
- Guglielmo, Thomas A. (2003). White on Arrival: Italians, Race, Color, and Power in Chicago, 1890-1945. Archived from the original on October 14, 2008 – via Questia.
- Harden, Jacalyn D. Double Cross: Japanese Americans in Black and White Chicago. (2003). 232 pp.
- Holli, Melvin G. and Jones, Peter d'A., eds. Ethnic Chicago: A Multicultural Portrait. (4th ed. 1995). 648 pp. essays by scholars on each major ethnic group
- Hoy, Suellen. Good Hearts: Catholic Sisters in Chicago's Past. (2006). 242 pp.
- Inglot, Tomasz, and John P. Pelissero. "Ethnic Political Power in a Machine City Chicago's Poles at Rainbow's End." Urban Affairs Review (1993) 28#4 pp: 526-543.
- Jaher, Frederic Cople. The Urban Establishment: Upper Strata in Boston, New York, Charleston, Chicago, and Los Angeles. (1982). 777 pp.
- "Chicago", Jewish Encyclopedia, vol. 4, New York: New York and London, 1907, hdl:2027/osu.32435029752912
- Kantowicz, Edward R. Corporation Sole: Cardinal Mundelein and Chicago Catholicism. (1983). 295 pp.
- Keil, Hartmut, ed. German Workers' Culture in the United States, 1850 to 1920. (1988). 330 pp.
- Keil, Hartmut and Jentz, John B., eds. German Workers in Industrial Chicago, 1850-1910: A Comparative Perspective. (1983). 252 pp.
- Lovoll, Odd S. A Century of Urban Life: The Norwegians in Chicago before 1930. (1988). 367 pp.
- McCaffrey, Lawrence J.; Skerrett, Ellen; Funchion, Michael F.; and Fanning, Charles. The Irish in Chicago. (1987). 171 pp.
- Nelli, Humbert S. The Italians in Chicago: A Study in Ethnic Mobility, 1880-1930. (1970). 300 pp.
- Pacyga, Dominic A. Polish Immigrants and Industrial Chicago: Workers on the South Side, 1880-1920. (1991). 322 pp. excerpt and text search
- Padilla, Felix M. Puerto Rican Chicago. (1987). 277 pp.
- Parot, Joseph John. Polish Catholics in Chicago, 1850-1920: A Religious History. (1982) 298 pp.
- Philpott, Thomas Lee. The Slum and the Ghetto: Immigrants, Blacks, and Reformers in Chicago, 1880-1930. (1978). 437 pp.
- Posadas, Barbara M. "Crossed Boundaries in Interracial Chicago: Filipino American Families since 1925," in Unequal Sisters: A Multi-Cultural Reader in U.S. Women's History, ed. Vicki L. Ruiz and Ellen Carol DuBois (1994), 319+.
- Rangaswamy, Padma. Namasté America: Indian Immigrants in an American Metropolis. 2000. 366 pp.
- Robertson, Darrel M. The Chicago Revival, 1876: Society and Revivalism in a Nineteenth-Century City. (1989). 225 pp.
- Sanders, James W. The Education of an Urban Minority: Catholics in Chicago, 1833-1965. (1977). 278 pp.
- Shanabruch, Charles. Chicago's Catholics: The Evolution of an American Identity. (1981). 296 pp.
- Shaw, Stephen J. The Catholic Parish as a Way-Station of Ethnicity and Americanization: Chicago's Germans and Italians, 1903-1939.(1991). 206 pp.
- Swierenga, Robert P. Dutch Chicago: A History of the Hollanders in the Windy City. (2002). 825 pp. excerpt and text search
- Tischauser, Leslie V. The Burden of Ethnicity: The German Question in Chicago, 1914-1941. (1990). 282 pp.
- Tuttle, William M., Jr. Race Riot: Chicago in the Red Summer of 1919. (1970). 305 pp.
- Wade, Louise Carroll. Chicago's Pride: The Stockyards, Packingtown, and Environs in the Nineteenth Century. (1987). 423 pp.
- Walch, Timothy. The Diverse Origins of American Catholic Education: Chicago, Milwaukee, and the Nation. (1988). 235 pp.
- Wellman, James K., Jr. The Gold Coast Church and the Ghetto: Christ and Culture in Mainline Protestantism. (1999). 241 pp.

== Sports, entertainment, music, newspapers ==
- Heap, Chad. Slumming: Sexual and Racial Encounters in American Nightlife, 1885-1940. (2009). 432 pp.
- Kenney, William Howland. Chicago Jazz: A Cultural History, 1904-1930. (1993). 233 pp.
- Kinsley, Philip (1943). The Chicago Tribune: Its First Hundred Years. Archived from the original on September 5, 2008 – via Questia.
- Sengstock, Charles A., Jr. That Toddlin' Town: Chicago's White Dance Bands and Orchestras, 1900-1950. (2004). 244 pp.
- Smith, Richard Norton. The Colonel: The Life and Legend of Robert R. McCormick, 1880-1955. (1997). 597 pp.
- Spirou, Costas and Bennett, Larry. It's Hardly Sportin': Stadiums, Neighborhoods, and the New Chicago. (2003). 212 pp.
- Vaillant, Derek. Sounds of Reform: Progressivism & Music in Chicago, 1873-1935. (2003). 401 pp.
- Ziemba, Joe. When Football Was Football: The Chicago Cardinals and the Birth of the NFL. (1999). 408 pp.

== Reputation, images, visions, planning ==
- Bachin, Robin F., Building the South Side: Urban Space and Civic Culture in Chicago, 1890-1919. (2004). 434 pp.
- Bukowski, Douglas. Big Bill Thompson, Chicago, and the Politics of Image. (1998). 273 pp. excerpt and text search
- Fairfield, John D. The Mysteries of the Great City: The Politics of Urban Design, 1877-1937. (1993). 320 pp.
- Flanagan, Maureen A. Seeing with Their Hearts: Chicago Women and the Vision of the Good City, 1871-1933. (2002). 319 pp. excerpt and text search
- Hines, Thomas S. Burnham of Chicago: Architect and Planner. (1974). 445 pp.
- Miller, Ross. American Apocalypse: The Great Fire and the Myth of Chicago. 1990. 287 pp.
- Ciccone, F. Richard (2001). Royko: A Life in Print. Archived from the original on September 4, 2008 – via Questia.
- Smith, Carl. The plan of Chicago: Daniel Burnham and the remaking of the American city (2009)
- Smith, Carl S. Chicago and the American Literary Imagination, 1880-1920. (1984). 232 pp.
- Spears, Timothy B. Chicago Dreaming: Midwesterners and the City, 1871-1919. (2005). 322 pp.
- Williams, Kenny J. A Storyteller and a City: Sherwood Anderson's Chicago. (1988). 314 pp.
- Williams, Kenny J. and Duffy, Bernard, eds. Chicago's Public Wits: A Chapter in the American Comic Spirit. (1983). 289 pp.
- Williams, Kenny J. Prairie Voices: A Literary History of Chicago from the Frontier to 1893. (1980). 529 pp.

== Primary sources ==
- Byrne, Jane (1992). My Chicago. New York: W. W. Norton. ISBN 0393030733. mayor in 1980s
- Despres, Leon Mathis; Heise, Kenan (2005). Challenging the Daley machine: a Chicago alderman's memoir. Evanston, IL: Northwestern University Press. ISBN 978-0-8101-2223-9.
- Fanning, Charles, ed. (1976). Mr. Dooley and the Chicago Irish: An Anthology. New York: Arno Press. ISBN 0405093349.
- Keil, Hartmut; Jentz, John B., eds. (1988). German workers in Chicago: a documentary history of working-class culture from 1850 to World War I. The Working class in American history. Urbana: University of Illinois press. ISBN 978-0-252-01458-1.
- Pierce, Bessie Louise; Norris, Joe L., eds. (2004) [1937]. As others see Chicago: impressions of visitors, 1673 - 1933 (Repr ed.). Chicago, Ill: University of Chicago Press. ISBN 978-0-226-66821-5.
- Royko, Mike (2001). For the Love of Mike: More of the Best of Mike Royko. Chicago: University of Chicago Press. ISBN 0226730743.
- Sandburg, Carl (1916). Chicago Poems. Archived from the original on January 15, 2008 – via Questia.
- Thomas, William; Znaniecki, Florian (1984) [1920]. The Polish Peasant in Europe and America. Vol. 1–2. ISBN 0-252-01092-2.

City directories

- General directory and business advertiser of the city of Chicago for the year 1844, Chicago: Ellis & Fergus, printers, 1902, OCLC 1898526, OL 7107412M
- Chicago City Directory. Chicago. 1863.
- Edward's Annual Director to the ... City of Chicago. Chicago : R. Edwards. 1869.
