= Dominic A. Pacyga =

American uban historican and academic

Dominic A. Pacyga (born May 1, 1949) is an American urban historian. He was a professor of history at Columbia College, Chicago from 1984 until 2017. Previous to his appointment to the faculty he served as associate director of Columbia College's Southeast Chicago Historical Project in Chicago's Steel District. He has worked in urban history, ethnic history and immigration history with a particular emphasis on the Polish diaspora in the United States. He is the author of Slaughterhouse: Chicago's Union Stock Yard and the World It Made (2018), Chicago: a Biography (2011), and American Warsaw: The Rise, Fall, and Rebirth of Polish Chicago (2021), each published by the University of Chicago Press, as well as Polish Immigrants and Industrial Chicago: Workers on the South Side, 1880-1922 (1991), published by Ohio State University Press and reissued in 2003 by the University of Chicago Pres. His new book Clout City: The Rise and Fall of the Chicago Political Machine was published in October 2025, by the University of Chicago Press. He is also co-author with Glen E. Holt of Chicago: A Historical Guide to the Neighborhoods [Loop and South Side] published by the Chicago Historical Society in 1979, and with Ellen Skerrett, Chicago City of Neighborhoods by Loyola University Press in 1986. He co-authored Chicago’s Southeast Side with Rod Sellers published by Arcadia Publishing in 1998. Pacyga co-edited with Charles Schanabruch, The Chicago Bungalow also published by Arcadia Publishing in 2001. His work has been translated into both the Polish and Chinese languages.

== Early life ==
Pacyga was born on May 1, 1949, in Chicago. His parents were Joseph B. Pacyga and Pauline Walkosz, the children of Polish Górals from Podhale who immigrated to the United States prior to World War I. His father won two Bronze Stars, a Silver Star, and two Purple Hearts, serving in the 3rd Armored Division in Europe in 1944–45. His mother first worked in the Canning Department at Armour & Company and then in the Chicago Chrysler Plant that built B-29 engines. Pacyga grew up in Chicago's Back of the Yards neighborhood and was educated at Sacred Heart of Jesus parochial school, and De La Salle Institute. He worked as a livestock handler and a security guard in the Union Stock Yard while attending college. Pacyga matriculated at the University of Illinois, Chicago, where he earned a BA in 1971, an MA in 1973, and a PhD in 1981. His dissertation on Polish workers in Chicago's South Side, 1880 to 1921, was supervised by Professor Leo Schelbert and had financial support from the Polish American Congress, the Kosciuszko Foundation, and the Polish American Scholarship Fund. In 1983 he and the historian Kathleen Alaimo married. They have two daughters.

== Career ==
Pacyga was an instructor in the Family and Community History Center, Newberry Library, in Chicago, where he first developed bus tours of the city's neighborhoods. He became associate director of Columbia College's "Southeast Chicago Historical Project" (1981–1984), a large-scale public history project in the city's Steel District. He then joined the faculty of Columbia College in 1984 as an unranked professor. He also was a visiting professor in the college of the University of Chicago in 1990–91. Pacyga was a visiting professor of history at the University of Illinois Chicago in 1992, and is currently an Affiliated Faculty member of the History Department. He eventually became a full professor once rank was finally granted to the faculty in 2005 at Columbia College Chicago. Pacyga was a visiting fellow at Campion Hall Oxford University, in 2005. He was a Fulbright Scholar at the Jagiellonian University in Kraków, Poland, in 2013–2014. Before retiring and receiving emeritus status in 2017 he served as interim department chair and also as interim dean of Liberal Arts & Sciences. In 2021, he lectured at the 4th International Conference Studying Public History held at the University of Wrocław in Poland.

Pacyga has been active in presenting public lectures and appearing in several documentaries, including Chicago: City of the Century and several episodes of ‘’Chicago Stories’’. Since 1976 Pacyga has presented bus tours of Chicago's neighborhoods focusing on the historical, economic, and demographic trends that created the city. He has also worked on museum exhibits for the Chicago Architecture Foundation; the Museum of Science and Industry; the Chicago Historical Museum; and the Polish Museum of America. He was head researcher from 2017 to 2024 for the Back Home: Polish Chicago exhibit at the Chicago History Museum. Currently Pacyga is Curator of Exhibits at the Packingtown Museum in Chicago.

From March 2018 to March 2019, Pacyga had a weekly podcast concerning Polish Chicago’s history on the WPNA-FM website. These were translated into Polish and appeared in the weekend edition of the Dziennik Związkowy.

Pacyga is a board member of the Society of Midland Authors. He has been a Board member of the Urban History Association, the Immigration and Ethnic History Society, the Polish American Historical Association, and the Lira Ensemble. He serves on the editorial board of the Journal of the Illinois State Historical Society.

== Honors and evaluations ==
Pacyga has won several academic awards. He received the Catholic Book Award in 1986 for Chicago: City of Neighborhoods. In 1991, Pacyga won the Oskar Halecki Award for Best Book on a Polish American Topic from the Polish American Historical Association for his book Polish Immigrants and Industrial Chicago: Workers on the South Side, 1880-1922. In 1999 and 2011, Pacyga obtained the Columbia College Chicago Excellence in Teaching Award. In 2014, he received the Miecislaus Haiman Award from the Polish American Historical Association. In 2016 Pacyga was awarded the Illinois State Historical Society's Russell P. Strange Memorial Book of the Year Award for Slaughterhouse. He won the Oskar Halecki Award from the Polish American Historical Association, Best Book on a Polish American Topic in 2019 and the like named Oskar Halecki Award of the Polish Institute of Arts and Sciences in America in 2019 for American Warsaw: The Rise, Fall, and Rebirth of Polish Chicago. The Polish American Congress Illinois Division granted him the historian award in 2019. In 2022 he was awarded the Medal Komisji Edukacji Narodowej (Medal of the Commission of National Education) of Poland. The Advocates Society awarded Pacyga the Award of Merit in 2021.In 2024 the Association of Polish Journalists in America gave Pacyga the Outstanding Polish Personality Award. The following year Pacyga won the Frederick Jackson Turner Lifetime Achievement in Midwestern History Award from the Midwestern History Association. That year he also received the Złoty Krzyż Zasługi (Golden Cross of Merit) from President of Poland Andrzej Duda. In 2026 he won his second Strange Award from the Illinois State Historical Society and the Pattis Family Foundation Book Award at the Newberry Library both for Clout City.

According to Professor Halina Parafianowicz of the University of Bialystok, American Warsaw: The Rise, Fall, and Rebirth of Polish Chicago is, "a credible, solid, and well-researched history of Polonia’s Chicago. It provides a legitimate perspective and sheds new light on its experience through various stages of its past and present, as the title suggests- -from rise to fall to rebirth. It is an accurate and valuable contribution to the scholarly literature on Chicago and Polonia."
