= Chicago Union Stock Yards fire (1910) =

Killed 21 CFD, 3 civilians

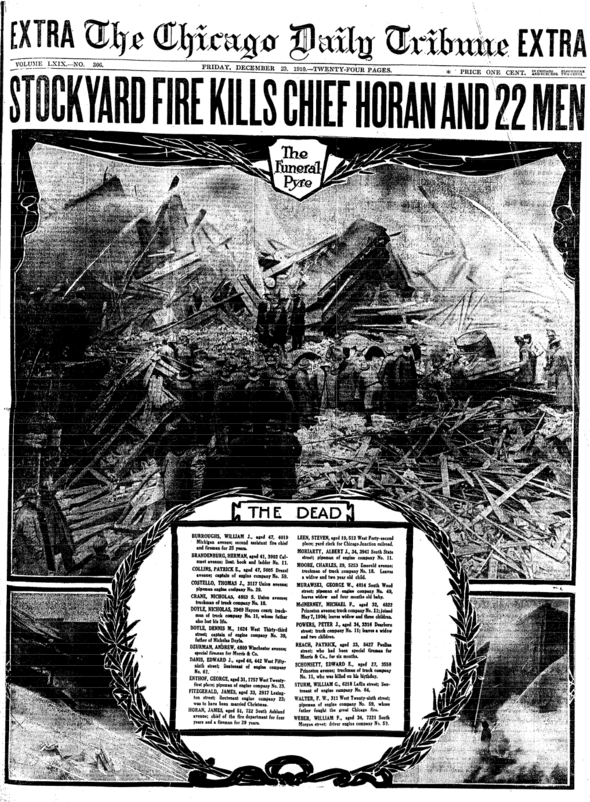
- The Chicago Daily Tribune's images of the 1910 fire and those killed by it
- Date: December 22, 1910
- Venue: Nelson Morris Company
- Location: Union Stock Yards, Chicago, Illinois, U.S.; 41°49′8.31″N 87°39′40.08″W
- Type: Fire
- Deaths: 21 firefighters, 3 Civilians

The Chicago Union Stock Yards fire occurred from December 22 to December 23, 1910, in Chicago, resulting in the deaths of twenty-one Chicago Fire Department firemen.

Until the September 11 attacks, the fire was the deadliest building collapse in American history, although the Texas City Disaster of 1947 killed more firefighters overall. It remains the worst such incident in Chicago history.

== History ==
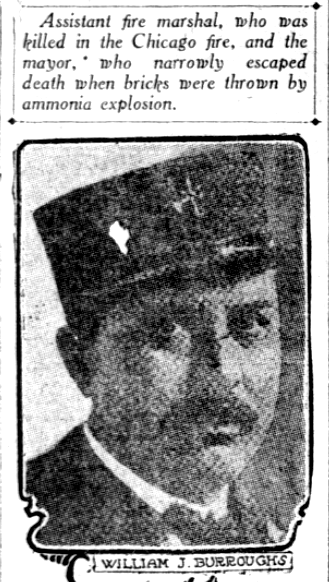
Assistant Fire Marshal William Burroughs, killed in the fire

The fire, which broke out at Warehouse 7 of the Nelson Morris Company at the Chicago Union Stock Yards on the 4300 block of South Loomis Street, was first reported on December 22 at 4:09 am. Half an hour later it was listed as a 4-11 (four alarm) blaze and within a few hours, more than thirty fire engines were battling the blaze. By the time the blaze was extinguished at 6:37 am on December 23, 50 engine companies and seven hook and ladder companies had been called to the scene. Fire hydrants near the location had been shut off prior to the outbreak of the fire to prevent freezing.

Twenty-one firemen, including Fire Chief James J. Horan, and three civilians were killed when one of the blazing buildings collapsed with them inside. Following Horan's death, First Assistant Chief Charles Seyferlich took command of the operations, diverting men from fighting the fire to search and retrieve the dead firefighters.

== Memorials ==
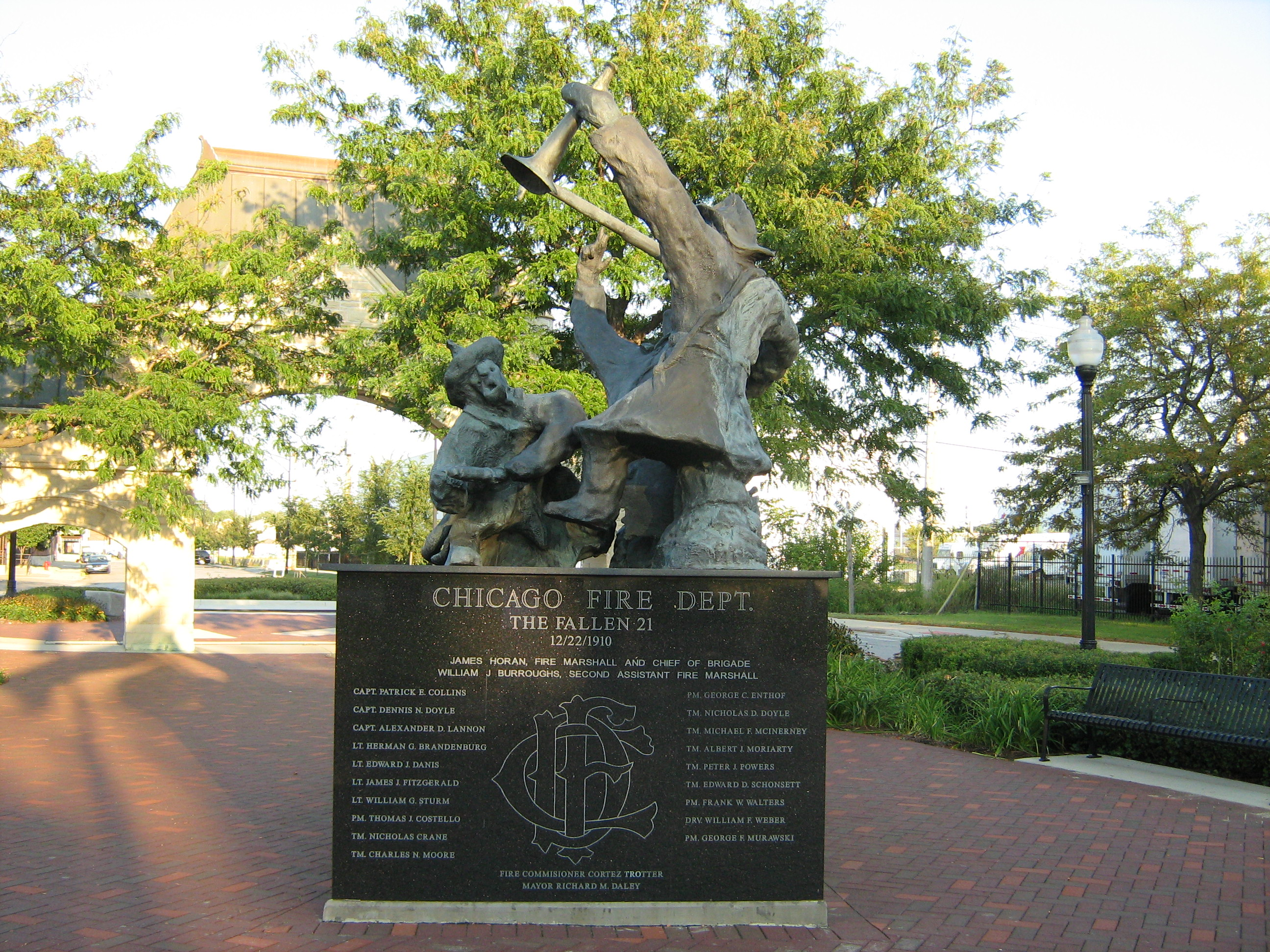
The memorial

In 2004, a memorial to all Chicago firefighters who have perished in the line of duty was erected near the location of the 1910 Stock Yards fire. The memorial was created at the urging of Chicago firefighters, who helped to raise about 75% of the $170,000 cost of the statue. The memorial includes the names of all Chicago firefighters who have died in the line of duty since 1865.

A historical marker titled "The Fallen 21," affixed to the old Union Stock Yard Gate a short distance from the memorial, offers a description of the fire.

Early film pioneer Freeman Harrison Owens filmed a newsreel of the fire and the firefighting effort.
