= Chicago Livestock World =

American newspaper (published 1900)

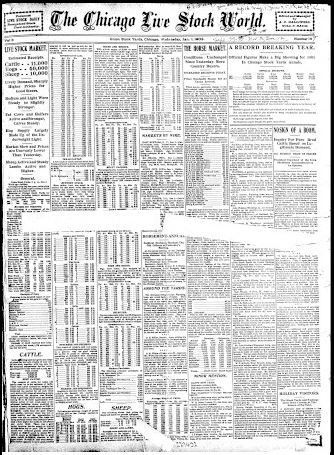
- Type: Daily newspaper
- Format: Broadsheet
- Founded: 1900
- Headquarters: Chicago, Illinois

Chicago Livestock World was a daily newspaper published at the Union Stock Yards in Chicago, Illinois, in 1900. Located in Chicago's meatpacking district, it reported information about the livestock market, agricultural advice, advertisements, and world news. The slogan on the masthead read: "World's Greatest Farm Newspaper." It was edited and managed by Ashleigh C. Halliwell and Will F. Baum.
