= Hammond Packing Plant =

Coordinates: 41.20878°N 95.96708°W

The Hammond Packing Plant was a division of the G.H. Hammond Company, Limited located at South 36th and O Streets in South Omaha, Nebraska.

== History ==
The plant was opened in the 1880s and was then closed in 1901, when it was bought by the Armour Company for $5,000,000. In 1905 the National Packing Company bought the plant to reopen it. National was later busted by the federal government in the "Beef Trust" conspiracy. There were a number of riots and civil unrest that originated or included events at the Cudahy Packing Plant.

== See also ==
- History of Omaha, Nebraska
- Economy of Omaha, Nebraska
