= Union Stock Yard Gate =

Historic gate in Chicago, Illinois

- Old Stone Gate, Chicago Union Stock Yards
- U.S. National Register of Historic Places
- U.S. National Historic Landmark
- Chicago Landmark
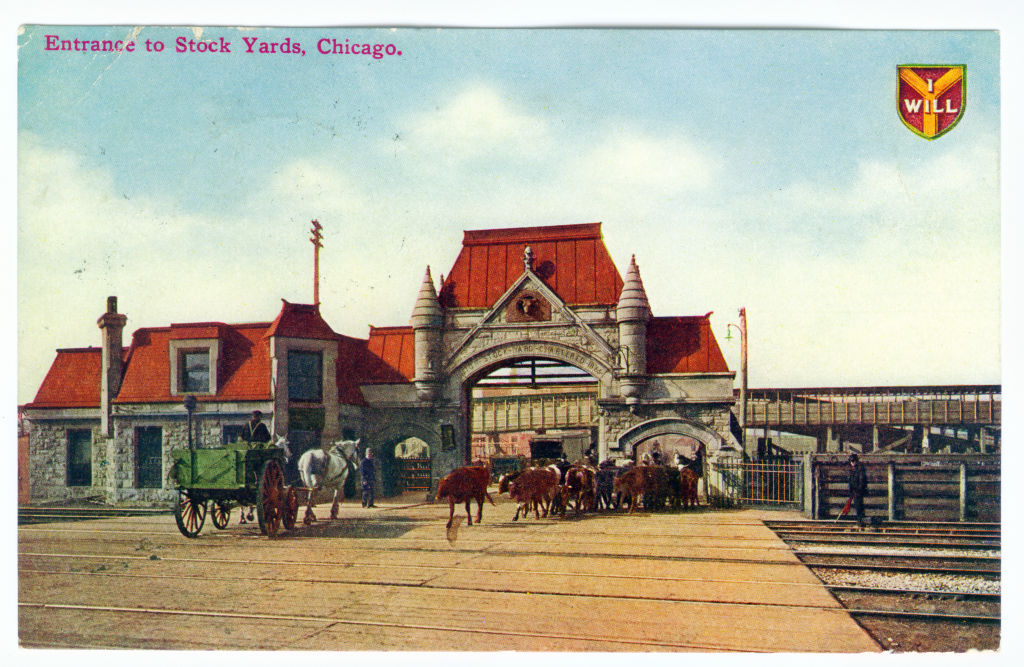
- The entry to the Union Stock Yards c. 1910

- Location within Chicago metropolitan area Location within Illinois
- Location: Exchange Ave., Chicago, Illinois
- Coordinates: 41°49′07″N 87°38′55″W
- Area: less than one acre
- Built: 1879
- Architect: Burnham & Root
- NRHP reference No.: 72000451

Significant dates
- Added to NRHP: December 27, 1972
- Designated NHL: May 29, 1981
- Designated CHICL: February 24, 1972

The Union Stock Yard Gate, located on Exchange Avenue at Peoria Street, was the entrance to the famous Union Stock Yards in Chicago. The gate was designed by Burnham and Root around 1875, and is the only significant structural element of the stock yards to survive. It was designated a National Historic Landmark in 1981. The plaza surrounding the gate also includes the city's principal memorial to its firefighters.

== Description ==
The Union Stock Yard Gate is located on Chicago's South Side, on a plaza in the center of Exchange Avenue at its junction with Peoria Street. This position marked the principal eastern entrance to the stock yards, which occupied several hundred acres to the west. It is a limestone construction with a central main arch flanked by two smaller arches. The main arch is 16 feet (4.9 m) wide and 17 feet (5.2 m) high, with the surmounting truncated hip roof giving the structure a total height of 32 feet (9.8 m). The piers of the central arch are topped by conical limestone turrets. The smaller side arches are asymmetrical (one is 6 feet (1.8 m) wide, the other 7.5 feet (2.3 m)), but are similarly styled on a smaller scale. One of the side arches retains an iron grillwork gate, of a style that both would have originally had. The main gate at one time had an iron portcullis.

== History ==
The Union Stock Yard was established in 1865, as a place to centralize the city's growing meatpacking industry. Its early facilities were constructed out of wood, with some elements later rebuilt in stone. This gate was designed by Daniel Burnham and John W. Root, who were responsible for the design of other structures in the yards, and constructed in 1879. The gate and an accompanying gatehouse (since demolished), were the only substantial buildings to survive a fire that leveled the yards in 1934.

Restored in the 1970s, the limestone gate now stands as one of the few reminders of Chicago's past dominance in the meat packing industry. Over the center arch of the gate is a bust of Sherman, stockyard superintendent John D. Sherman's favorite bull.

The gate was designated an official Chicago Landmark on February 24, 1972; a plaque from the Commission on Chicago Landmarks is just east of the gate. The gate was added to the National Register of Historic Places on December 27, 1972, and it was designated a National Historic Landmark on May 29, 1981.

Just west of the gate is a memorial statue depicting the efforts of firefighters during the Chicago Union Stock Yards Fire of 1910, which was the deadliest building collapse in American history until the 9/11 attacks in 2001. The names of the 21 men who died are in the front of the base; listed on the other sides are the names of all Chicago firefighters who have died in the line of duty. A plaque titled "The Fallen 21," telling the story of that fire, can be found affixed to the gate itself.

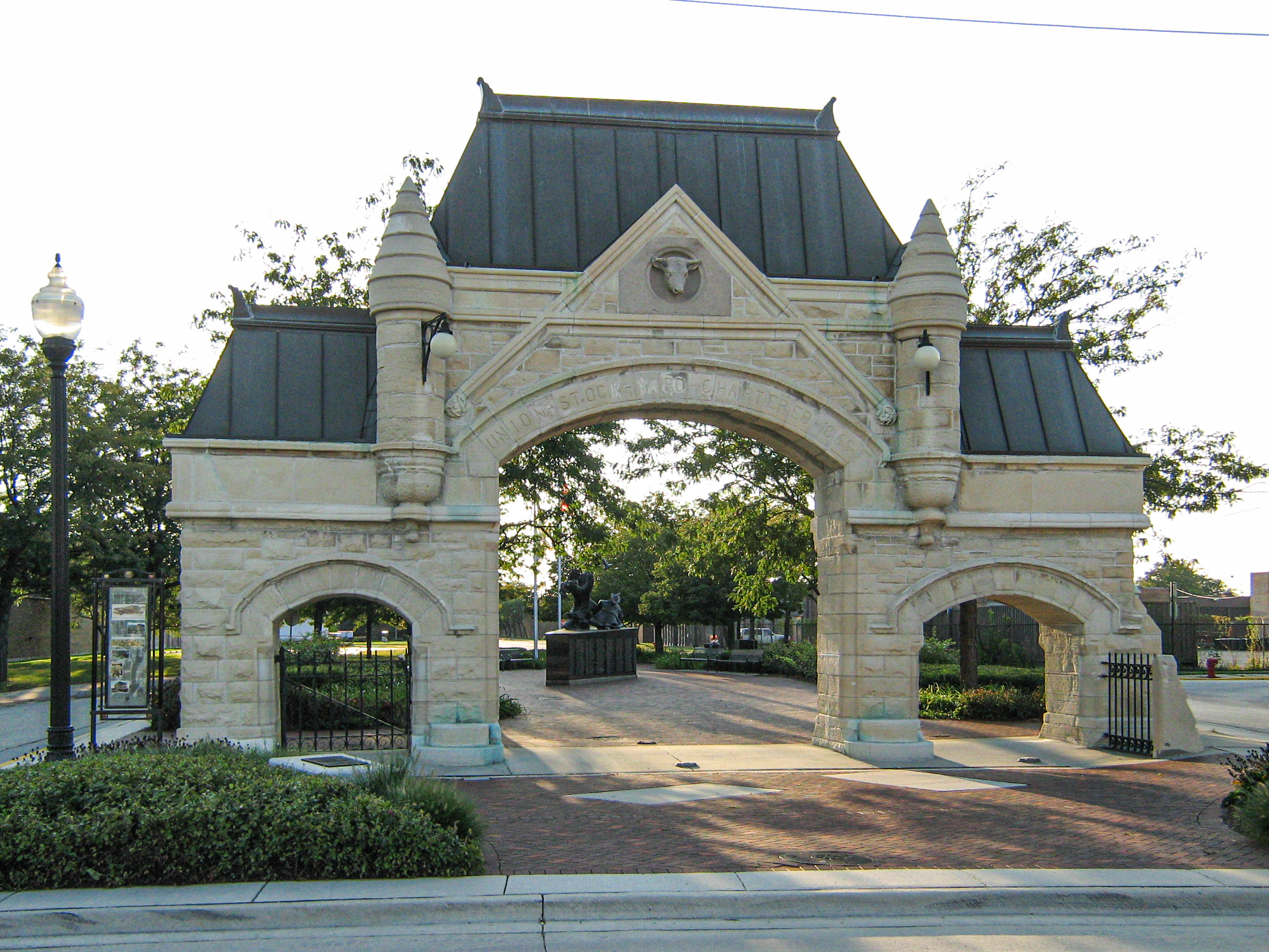
Current view of the Gate. Firefighters memorial in the center background

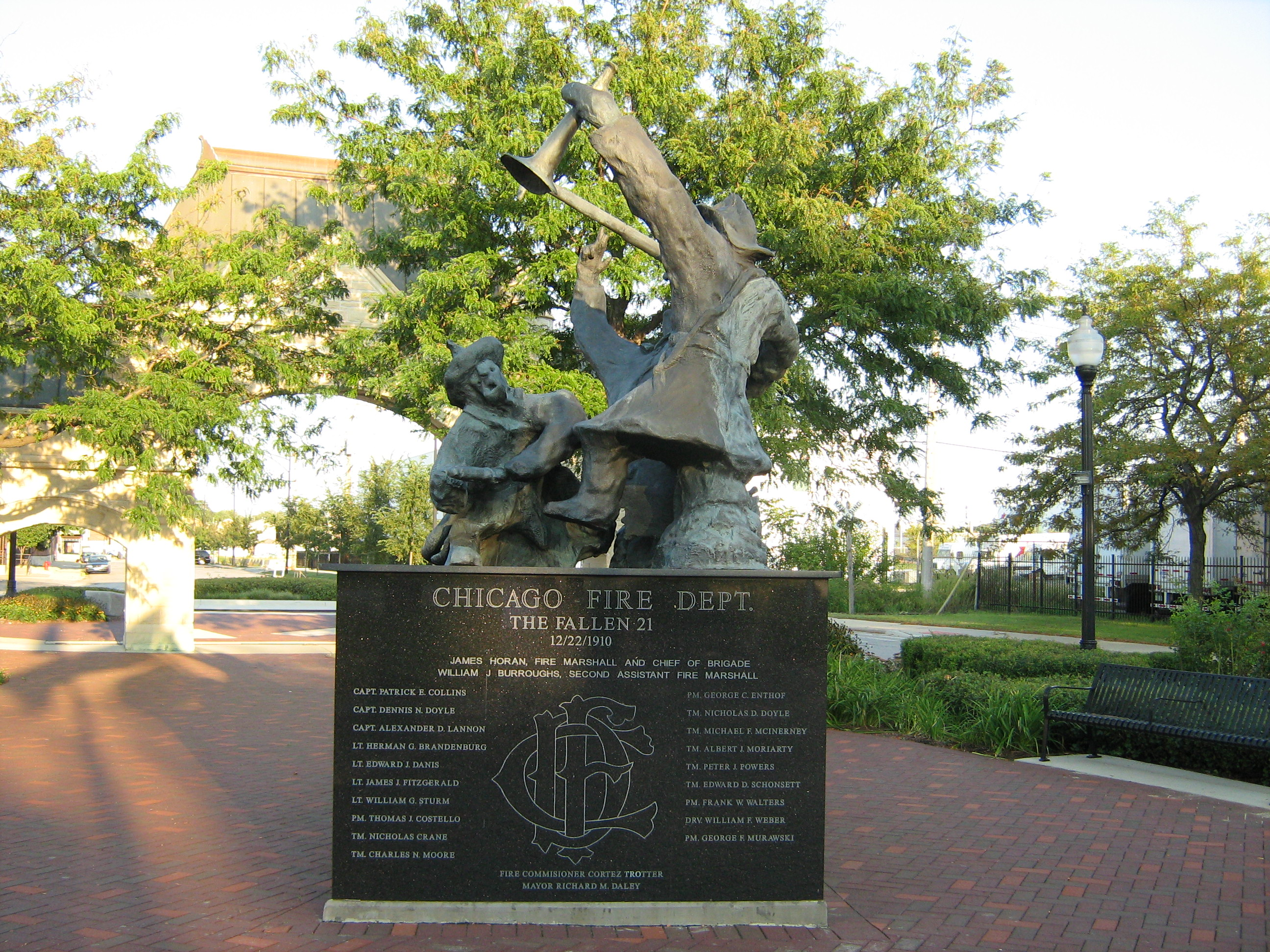
Memorial honoring firefighters fallen in the 1910 Stock Yard fire. Located directly behind The Gate

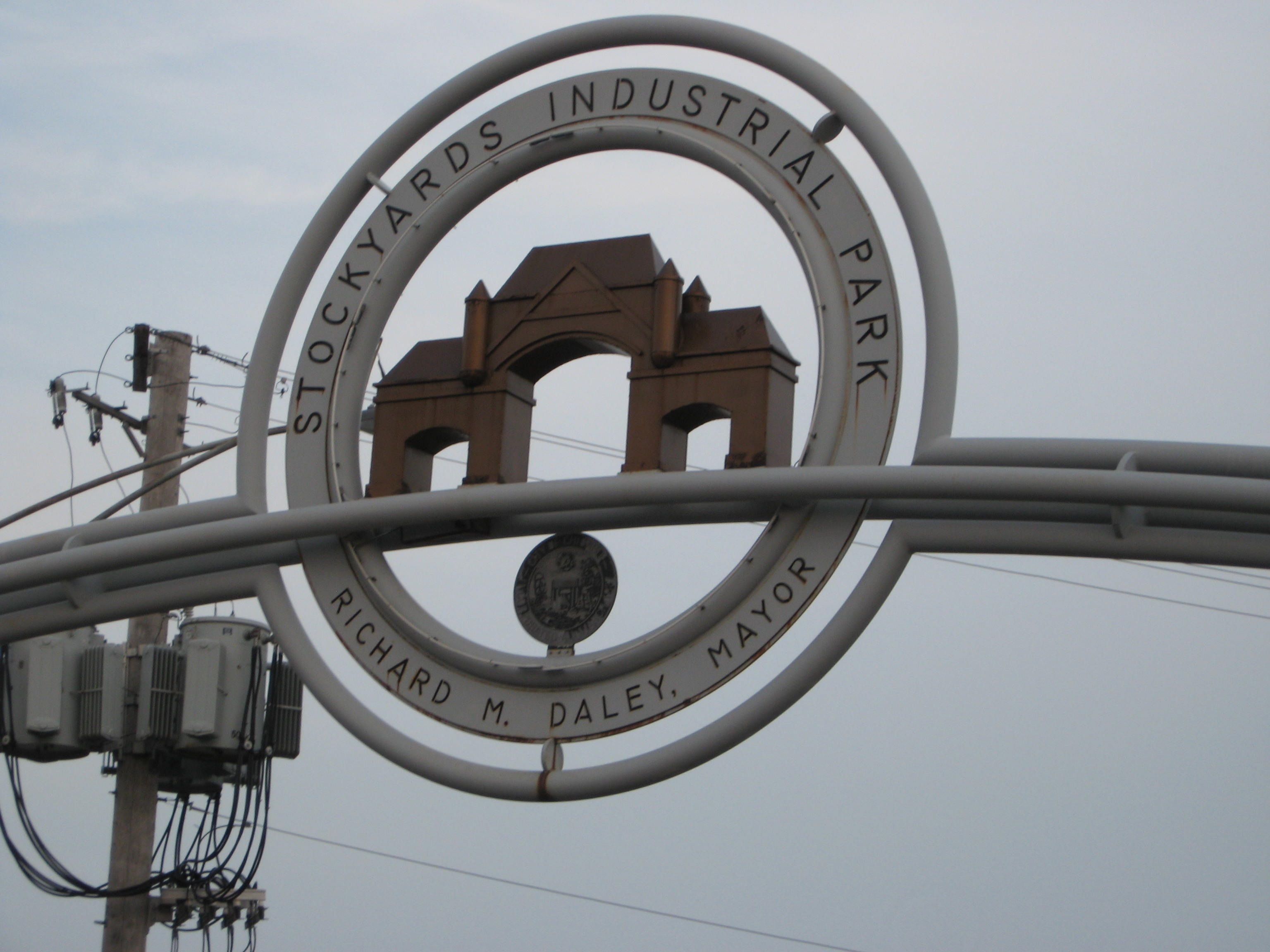
Detail of the gate of the Stockyard Industrial Park, featuring a miniature of The Gate is on W 43rd ST at S Ashland AVE.

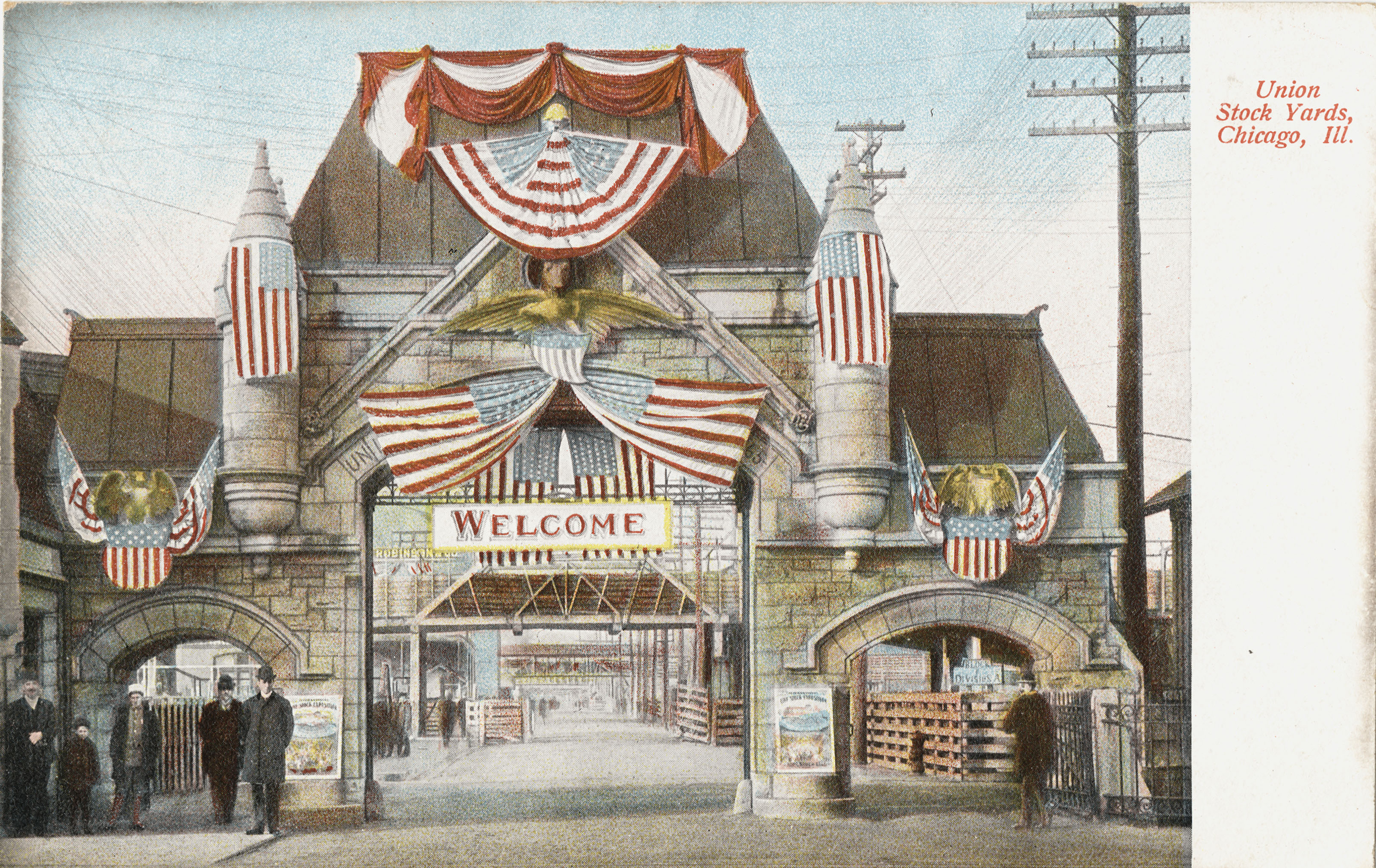
Postcard of Union Stock Yards, Chicago, Illinois, circa 1901–1907

== See also ==
- List of National Historic Landmarks in Illinois
- National Register of Historic Places listings in South Side Chicago
