= Union Stock Yards =

Meatpacking district of Chicago

Coordinates: 41.816°N 87.657°W

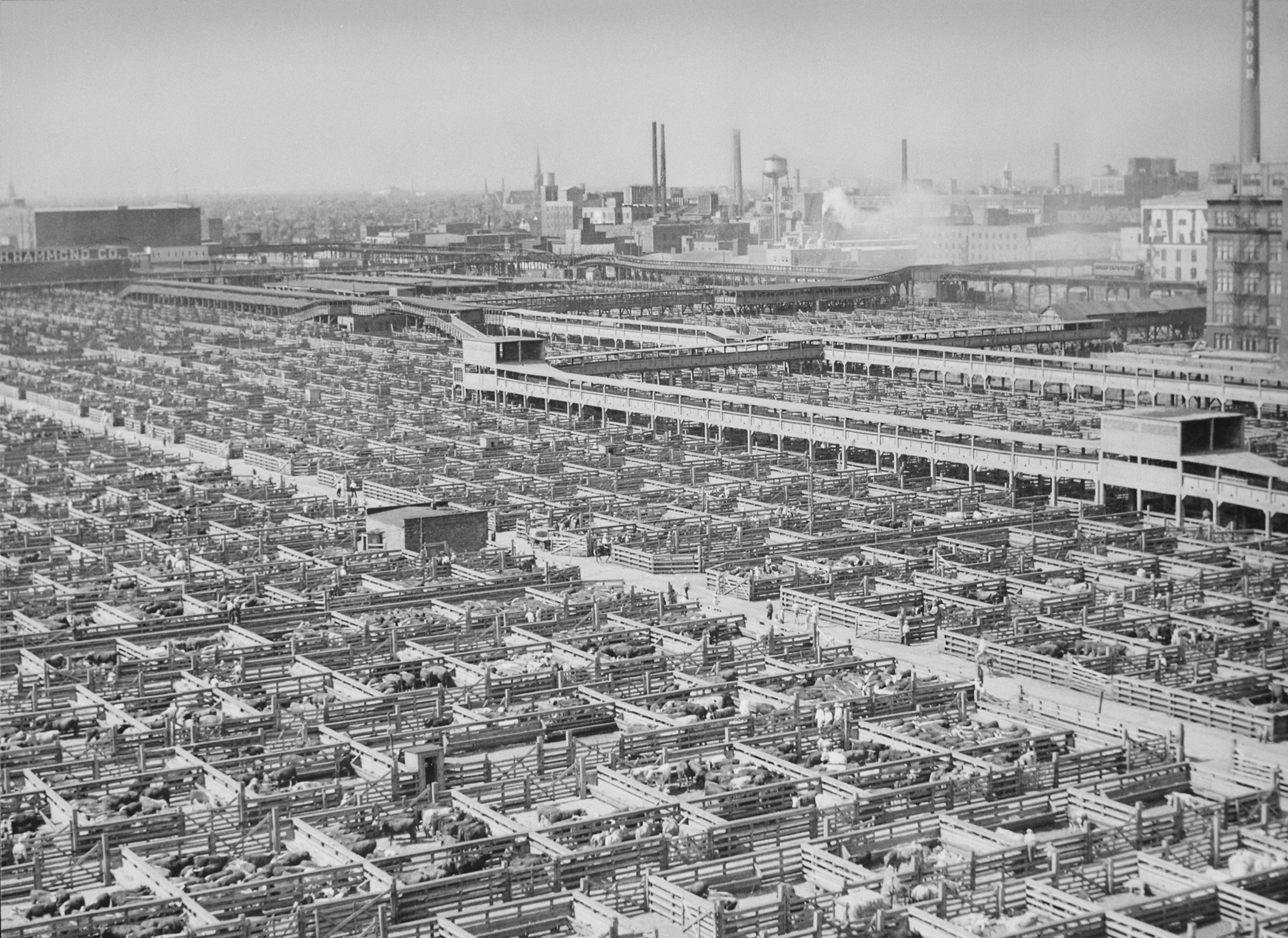
The Union Stock Yards in 1947

The Union Stock Yard & Transit Co., or The Yards, was the meatpacking district in Chicago for more than a century, starting in 1865. The district was formed by a group of railroad companies that acquired marshland and turned it into a vast centralized processing area. By the 1890s, the railroad capital behind the Union Stockyards was Vanderbilt money. The Union Stockyards operated in the South Side's New City community area for 106 years, helping Chicago become known as the "hog butcher for the world", the center of the American meatpacking industry for decades. The Yards, its workers, and its systems became inspiration for both literature and social reform, as well as study of industrial practice.

The stockyards became the focal point of the rise of some of the earliest international companies, whose ability to get product moved across the world became crucial. These companies and corporations refined industrial innovations and influenced financial markets. The Yards functioned as an integrated system linking transportation, livestock handling, processing, and distribution within a single site. Both the rise and fall of the Yards reflect the evolution of transportation services and technology in America. The stockyards have become integral in Chicago's cultural history. They are also considered one of the chief drivers that empowered the animal–industrial complex into its modern form.

From the Civil War through the 1920s, peaking in 1924, more meat was processed in Chicago than in any other place in the world. Construction began in June 1865 with an opening on Christmas Day. The Yards closed on July 30, 1971, after several decades of decline during the decentralization of the meatpacking industry. The neo-gothic Union Stock Yard Gate (1877) on Exchange Avenue was designated a Chicago Landmark in 1972 and a National Historic Landmark in 1981 and is one of the only remnants of the old stockyards (along with several freight rail lines and right-of-ways and the former Live Stock National Bank building) which largely became business and industrial parks after the closure.

== History ==
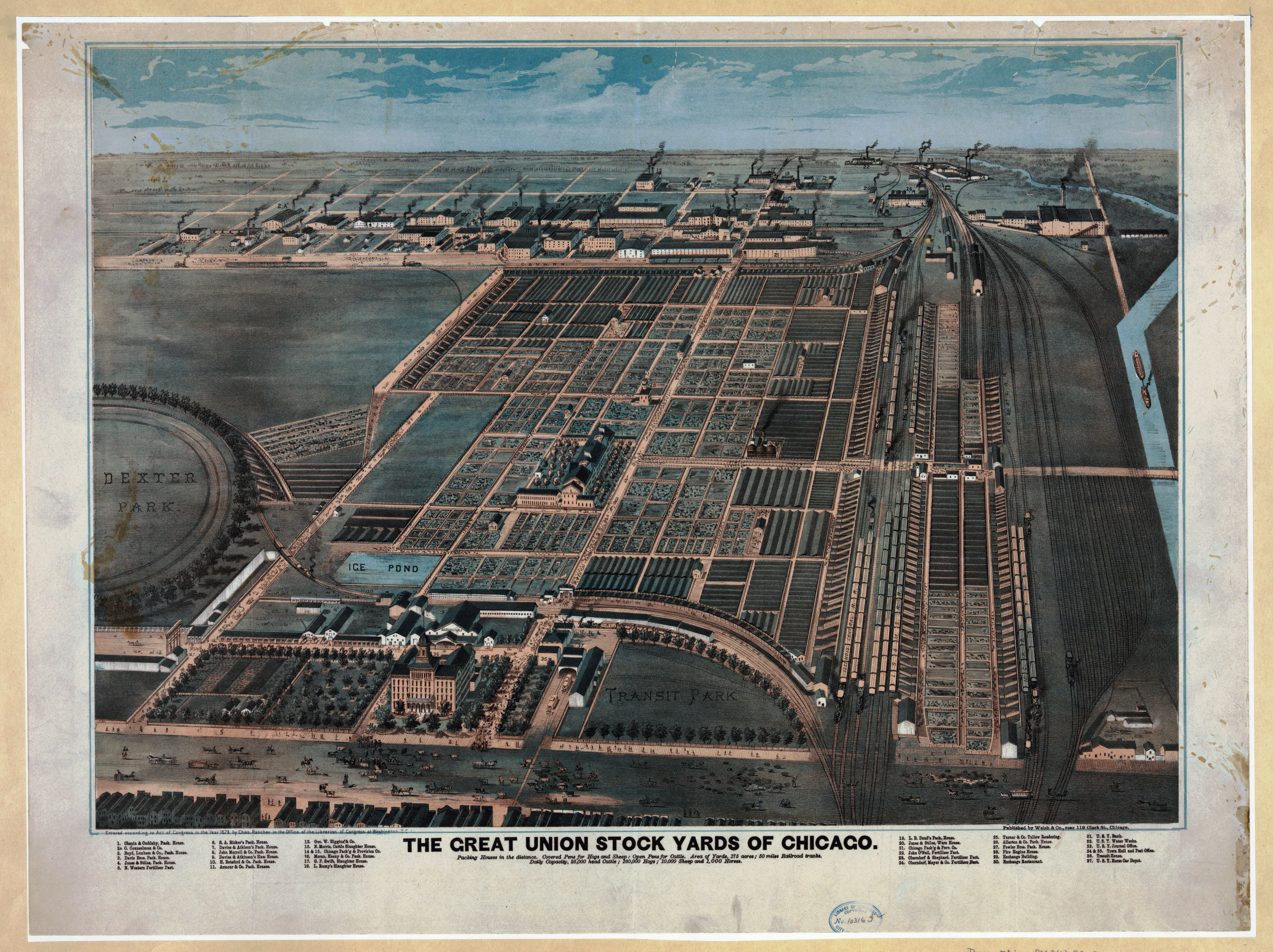
The Union Stock Yards in 1878

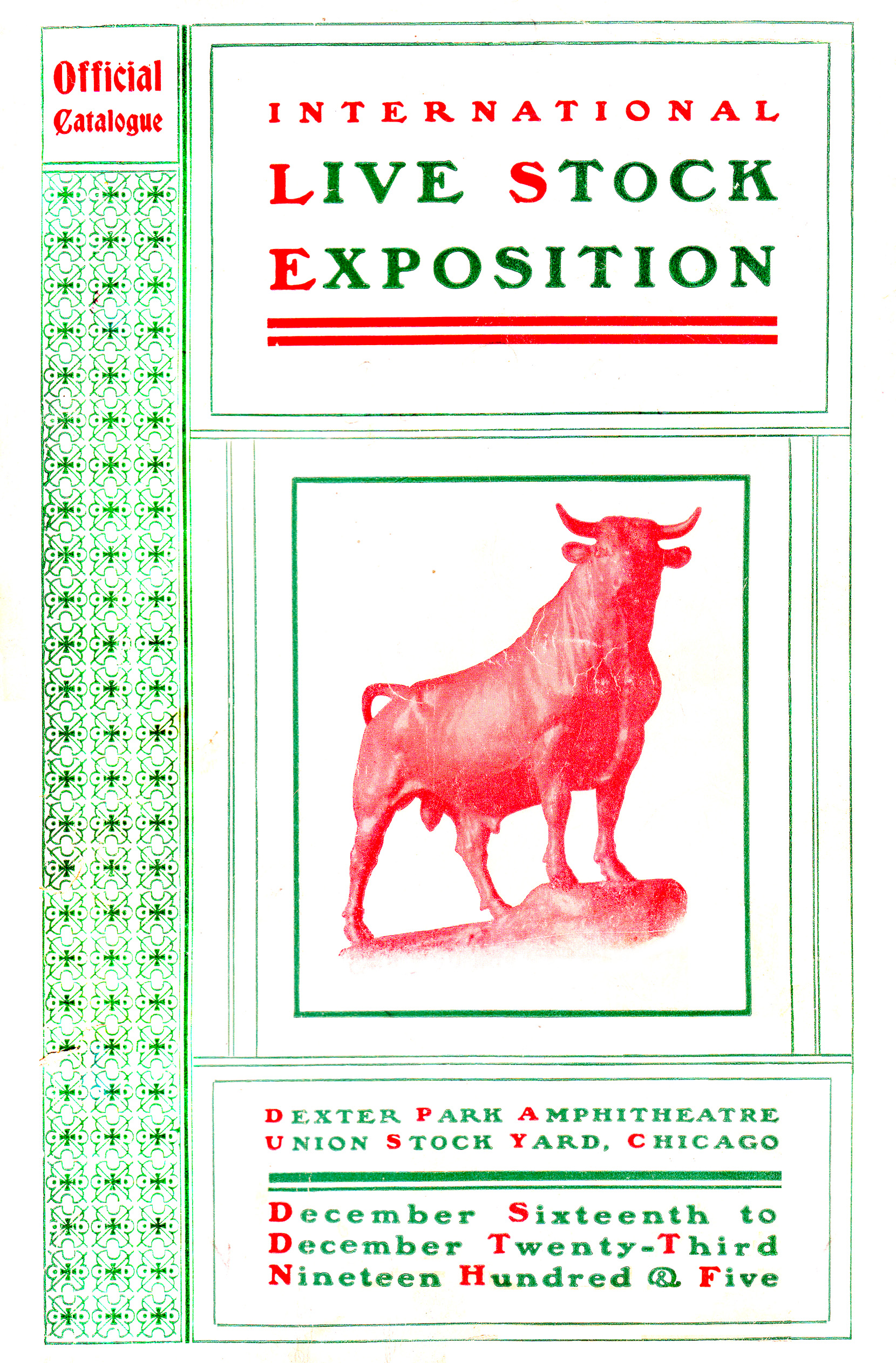
1905 International Live Stock Exposition catalogue

In the early 1860s the meat packing industry of the United States was located in Cincinnati, Ohio, the original "Porkopolis" of the pre-Civil War era. However, with the end of the Civil War, the meat packing industry had started to move westward along with the westward migration of the population of the United States. For the meat packing industry moving west meant coming to Chicago. As early as 1827, Archibauld Clybourn had established himself as a butcher in a log slaughterhouse on the north branch of the Chicago River and supplied most to the garrison of Fort Dearborn. Other small butchers came later. In 1848, the Bull's Head Stockyard began operations at Madison Street and Ogden Avenue on the West Side. Operations for this early stockyard, however, still meant holding and feeding cattle and hogs in transit to meat packing plants further east especially Indianapolis and Cincinnati.

Before construction of the various private stockyards, tavern owners provided pastures and care for cattle herds waiting to be sold. With the spreading service of railroads, several small stockyards were created in and around Chicago. In 1848, a stockyard called the Bull's Head Market was opened to the public. The Bulls Head Stock Yards were located at Madison Street and Ogden Avenue. In the years that followed, several small stockyards were scattered throughout the city. Between 1852 and 1865, five railroads were constructed to Chicago. The stockyards that sprang up were usually built along various rail lines of these new railroad companies. Some railroads built their own stockyards in Chicago. The Illinois Central and the Michigan Central railroads combined to build the largest set of pens on the lake shore east of Cottage Grove Avenue from 29th Street to 35th Street. In 1878, the New York Central Railroad managed to buy a controlling interest in the Michigan Central Railroad. In this way, Cornelius Vanderbilt, owner of the New York Central Railroad, got his start in the stockyard business in Chicago.

Several factors contributed to consolidation of the Chicago stockyards: westward expansion of railroads between 1850 and 1870, which drove great commercial growth in Chicago as a major railroad center, and the Mississippi River blockade during the Civil War that closed all north–south river trade. The United States government purchased a great deal of beef and pork to feed the Union troops. As a consequence, hog receipts at the Chicago stockyards rose from 392,000 hogs in 1860 to 1,410,000 hogs over the winter butchering season of 1864–1865; over the same time period, beef receipts rose from 117,000 head to 338,000 head. With an influx of butchers and small meat packing concerns, the number of businesses greatly increased to process the flood of livestock being shipped to the Chicago stockyards. The goal was to butcher and process the livestock locally rather than transferring it to other northern cities for butchering and processing.

The Union Stock Yards, designed to consolidate operations, was built in 1864 on marshland south of the city. It was south and west of the earlier stock yards in an area bounded by Halsted Street on the east, South Racine Avenue on the west, with 39th Street as the northern boundary and 47th Street as the southern boundary. Led by the Alton, Chicago & St. Louis Railroad and the Lake Shore and Michigan Southern Railway, a consortium of nine railroad companies (hence the "Union" name) acquired the 320-acre (1.3 km^{2}) marshland area in southwest Chicago for US$100,000 in 1864. The stockyards were connected to the city's main rail lines by 15 miles (24 km) of track. In 1864, the Union Stock Yards were located just outside the southern boundary of the city of Chicago. Within five years, the area was incorporated into the city.

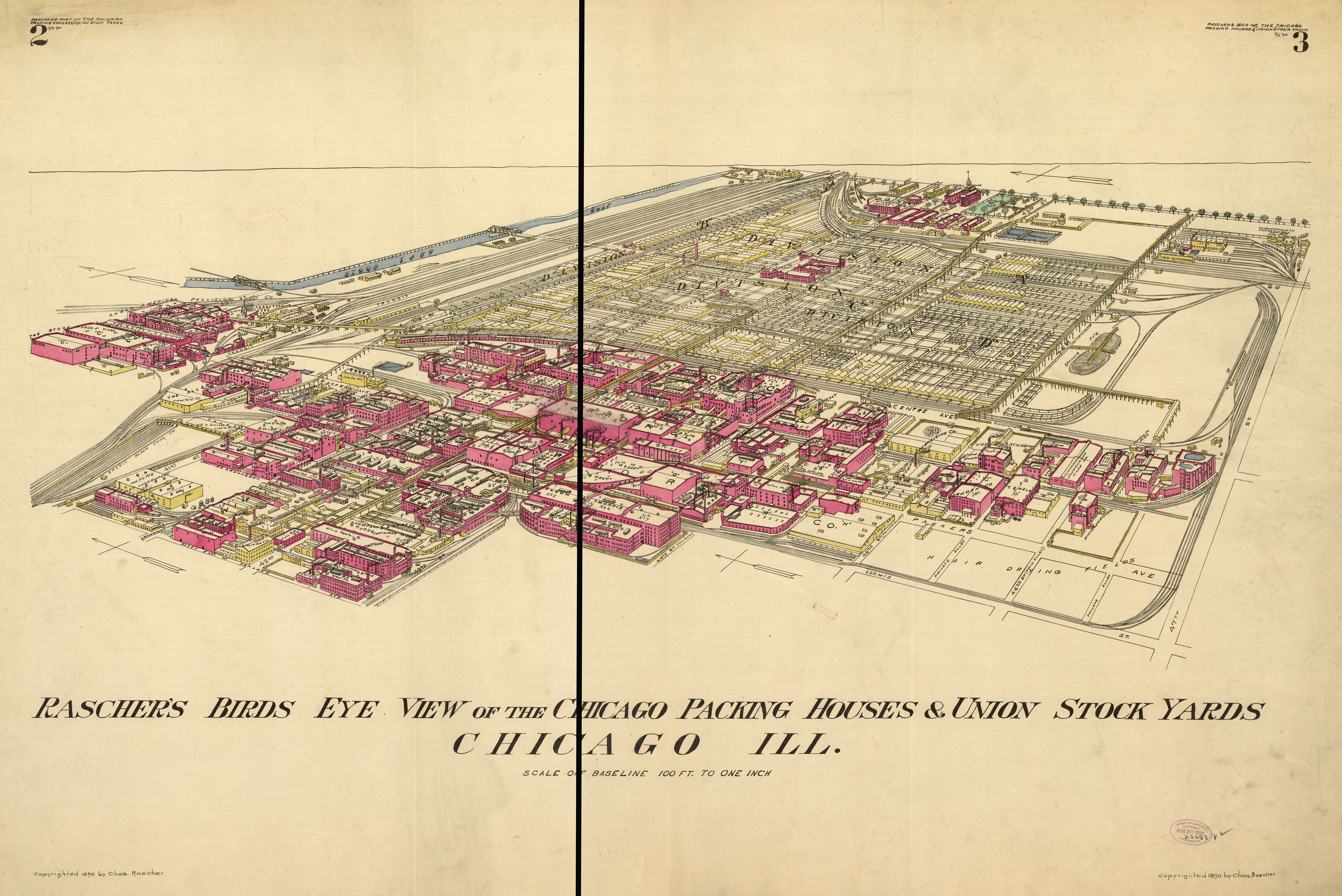
Birdseye view, 1890

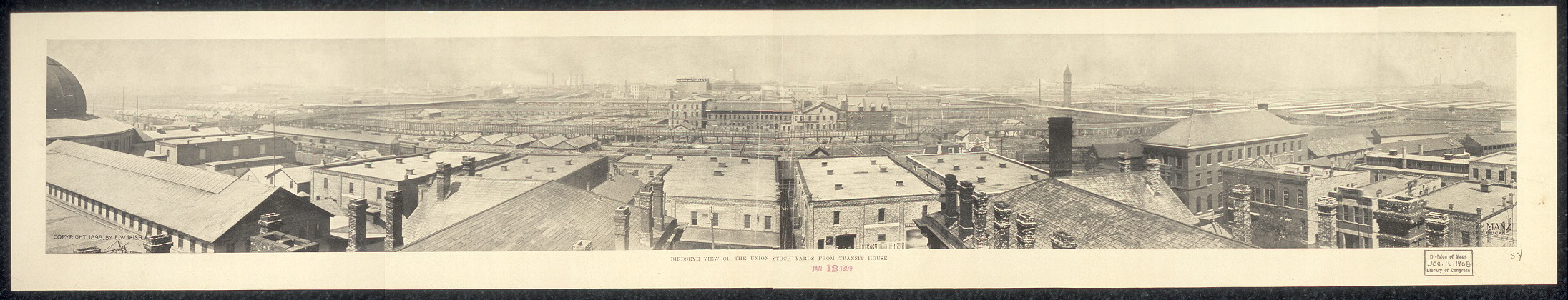
The yards in 1897

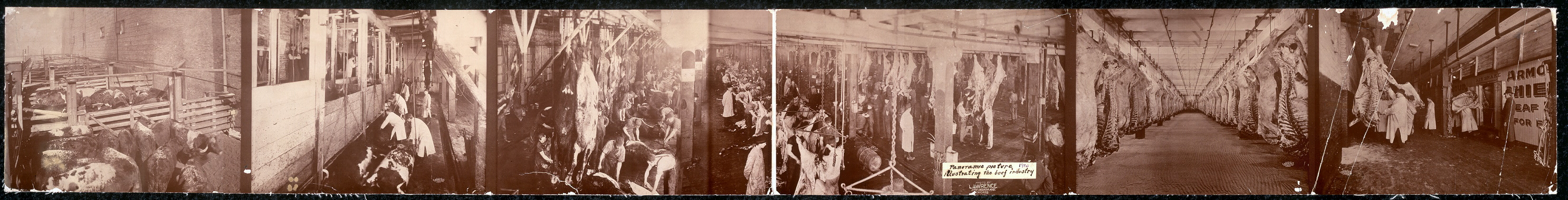
Panorama of the beef industry in 1900

Sheep exiting a train into the stockyards as filmed by the Edison Company in 1897

Eventually, the 375-acre (1.52 km^{2}) site had 2,300 separate livestock pens, room to accommodate 75,000 hogs, 21,000 cattle and 22,000 sheep at any one time. Additionally, hotels, saloons, restaurants, and offices for merchants and brokers sprang up in the growing community around the stockyards. Led by Timothy Blackstone, a founder and the first president of the Union Stock Yards and Transit Company, "The Yards" experienced tremendous growth. Processing two million animals yearly by 1870, in two decades the number rose to nine million by 1890. Between 1865 and 1900, approximately 400 million livestock were butchered there.

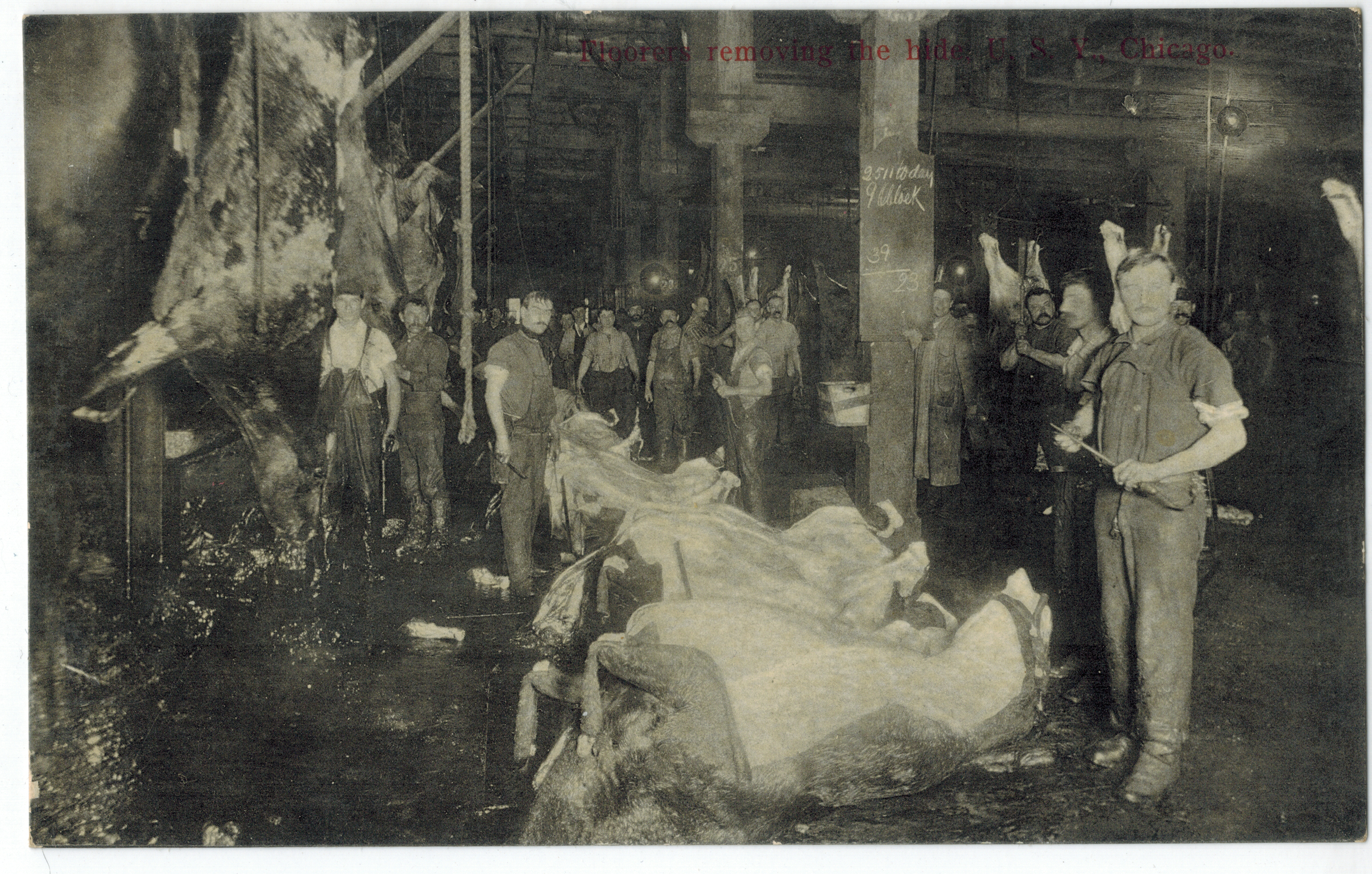
Workers in the stockyards removing hides of animals

By the start of the 20th century, the stockyards employed 25,000 people and produced 82 percent of the domestic meat consumed nationally. In 1921, the stockyards employed 40,000 people. Two thousand men worked directly for the Union Stock Yard & Transit Co., and the rest worked for companies such as meatpackers, which had plants in the stockyards. By 1900, the 475-acre (1.92 km^{2}) stockyard contained 50 miles (80 km) of road and had 130 miles (210 km) of track along its perimeter. At its largest area, The Yards covered nearly 1 square mile (3 km^{2}) of land, from Halsted Street to Ashland Avenue and from 39th Street (now Pershing Road) to 47th Street.

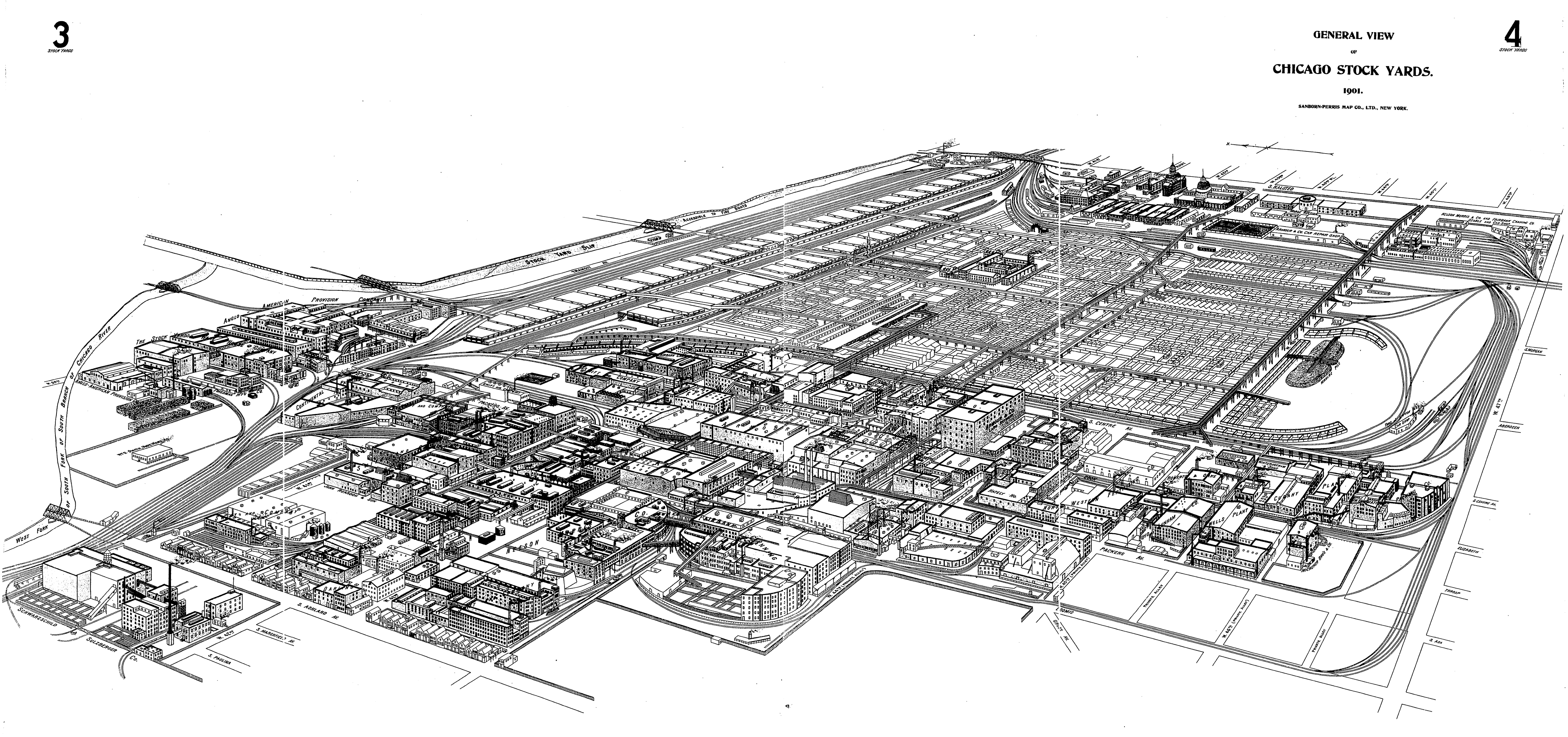
General view of the Union Stock Yards, 1901.

At one time, 500,000 US gallons (2,000 m^{3}) per day of Chicago River water were pumped into the stockyards. So much stockyard waste drained into the South Branch of the river that it was called Bubbly Creek due to the gaseous products of decomposition. The creek bubbles to this day. When the city permanently reversed the flow of the Chicago River in 1900, the intent was to prevent the Stock Yards' waste products, along with other sewage, from flowing into Lake Michigan and contaminating the city's drinking water.

The meatpacking district was served between 1908 and 1957 by a short Chicago 'L' line with several stops, devoted primarily to the daily transport of thousands of workers and even tourists to the site. The line was constructed when Chicago forced the removal of surface trackage on 40th Street.

Evolving methods of transportation and distribution led to declining business and the closing of the Union Stock Yards in 1971. National Wrecking Company negotiated a contract whereby a 102-acre site and some 50 acres of animal pens were cleared, along with auxiliary buildings and the eight-story Exchange Building. It took approximately eight months to complete the job and ready the site for the building of an industrial park.

=== Effect on industry ===
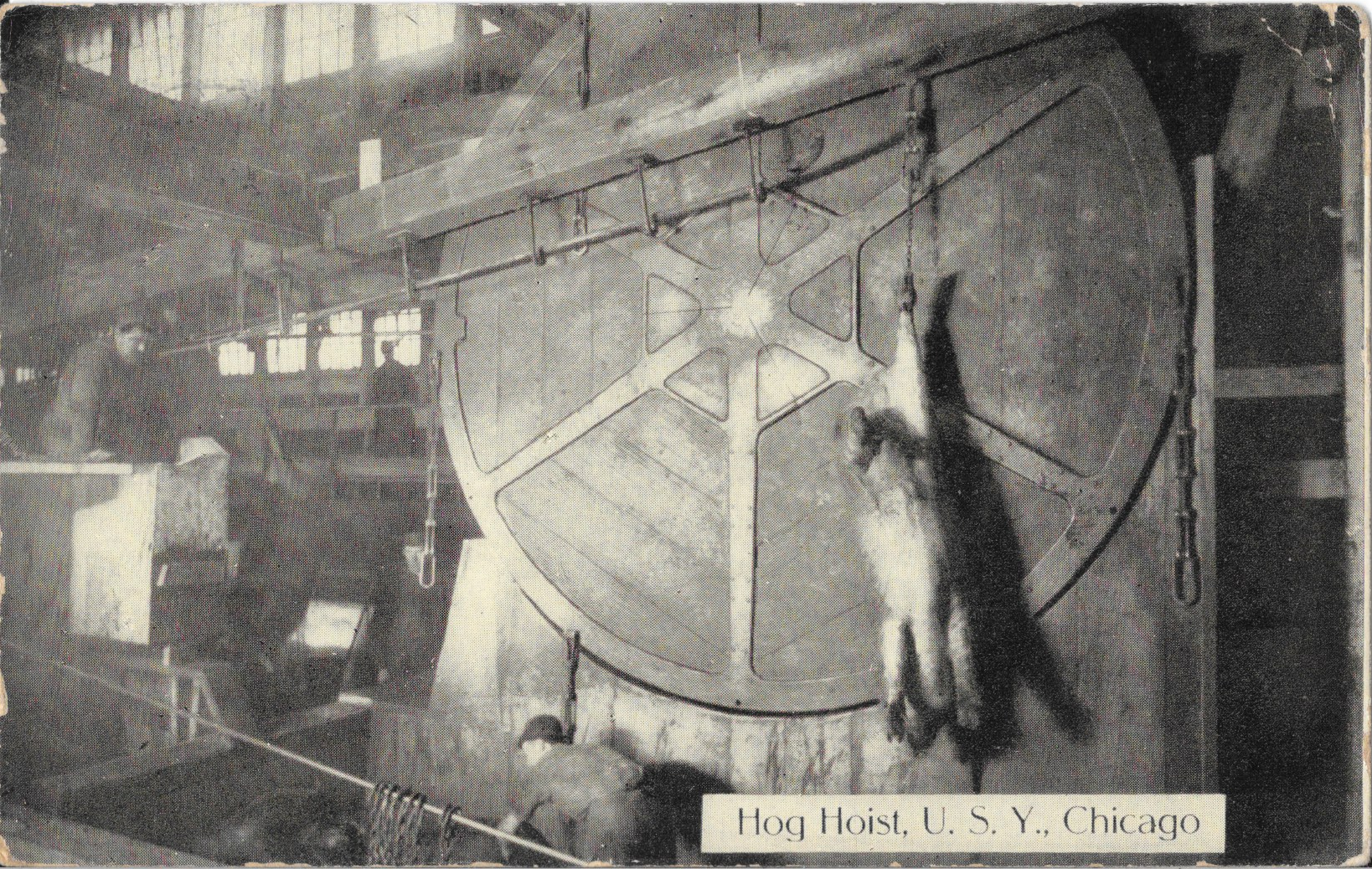
Hog hoist, circa 1909

The area and scale of the stockyards, along with technological advancements in rail transport and refrigeration, allowed for the creation of some of America's first truly global companies led by entrepreneurs such as Gustavus Franklin Swift and Philip Danforth Armour. Armour was the first person to build a modern large-scale meatpacking plant in Chicago in 1867. The Armour plant was built at 45th Street and Elizabeth Avenue immediately to the west of the Union Stockyards. The plant employed the modern "assembly line" (or rather disassembly line) method of work. The mechanized process with its killing wheel and conveyors helped inspire the automobile assembly line that Henry Ford popularized in 1913. For a time the Armour plant, located on a 12-acre site, was renowned as the largest factory in the world.

In addition, hedging transactions by the stockyard companies were pivotal in the establishment and growth of the Chicago-based commodity exchanges and futures markets. Selling on the futures market allowed the seller to have a guaranteed price at a set time in the future. This was helpful to those sellers who expected their cattle or hogs to come to market with a glut of other cattle or hogs when prices might necessarily be substantially lower than the guaranteed futures price.

Following the arrival of Armour in 1867, Gustav Swift's company arrived in 1875 and built another modern large-scale meatpacking plant at 42nd Street and South Justine Street. Morris & Company built a meatpacking plant at 42nd Street and Elizabeth Street. The Hammond Company and the Wilson Company also built meatpacking plants in the area west of the Chicago stockyards. Eventually, meatpacking byproduct manufacturing of leather, soap, fertilizer, glue (such as the large glue factory located at 44th Street and Loomis Street), pharmaceuticals, imitation ivory, gelatin, shoe polish, buttons, perfume, and violin strings prospered in the neighborhood. Additionally, there was a "Hair Factory", located at 44th Street and Ashland Avenue, which processed hair from butchered animals into saleable items.

Next to the Union Stock Yards, the International Amphitheatre building was built on the west side of Halsted Street at 42nd Street in the 1930s, originally to hold the annual International Live Stock Exposition which began in 1900. It became a venue for many national conventions.

Historian William Cronon concludes:

Because of the Chicago packers, ranchers in Wyoming and feedlot farmers in Iowa regularly found a reliable market for their animals, and on average received better prices for the animals they sold there. At the same time and for the same reason, Americans of all classes found a greater variety of more and better meats on their tables, purchased on average at lower prices than ever before. Seen in this light, the packers' "rigid system of economy" seemed a very good thing indeed.

=== Fires ===
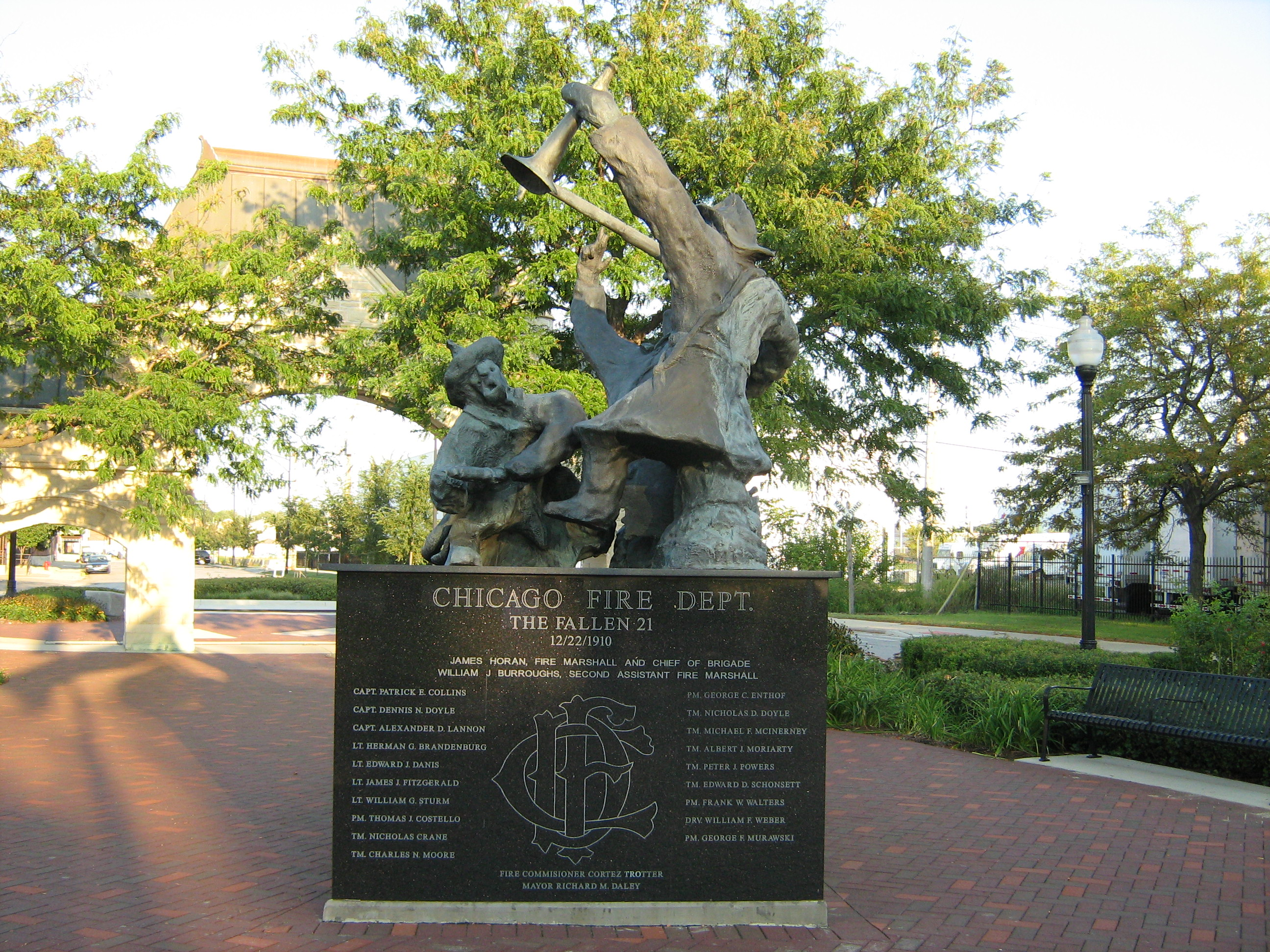
Memorial to victims of the 1910 fire

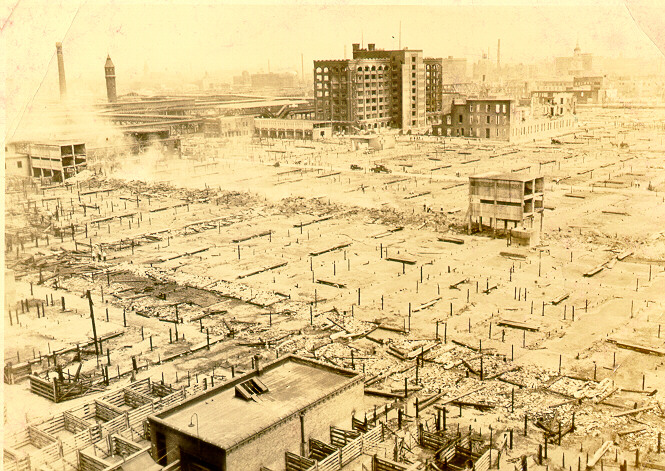
Aftermath of the 1934 fire

The first Chicago Union Stock Yards fire started on December 22, 1910, destroying $400,000 of property and killing 21 firemen, including the Fire Marshal James J. Horan. Fifty engine companies and seven hook and ladder companies fought the fire until it was declared extinguished on December 23. In 2004, a memorial to all Chicago firefighters who have died in the line of duty was erected just behind the Union Stock Yards Gate at the intersection of Exchange Avenue and Peoria Street.

A larger fire occurred on May 19, 1934, which burned almost 90 percent of the stockyards, including the Exchange Building, the Stock Yard Inn, and the International Livestock Exposition building. The fire was seen as far away as Indiana and caused approximately $6 million in damages. One employee and 8,000 head of cattle died.

=== Workers and unions ===
Following the opening of the Union Stockyards on December 25, 1865, a community of workers began living in the area just west of the packing plants between Ashland Avenue and South Robey Street and bounded on the north by 43rd Street and on the south by 47th Street. At first, the residents were overwhelmingly Irish and German—60% Irish and 30% German. By 1900 newly arrived Poles, Slovaks, and Lithuanians were replacing English, German, and Bohemian workers. Instead of complex machinery that required skilled workers, simplification made it possible to use strong unskilled men. at a lower pay scale. The jobs paid far more than anything in Eastern Europe, and new employees brought over their relatives.

Historian Dominic A. Pacyga explores several key themes in urban economic history. He argues that the Chicago Stockyards played a crucial role in creating a modern industrial culture characterized by large corporations, a factory system merging human and machine labor, and an extensive transportation system based on the railroads linking Chicago to the rural Midwest. He shows how the Union Stock Yard shaped the surrounding ethnic neighborhoods and supported the upward mobility of tens of thousands of immigrant families, especially the Polish employees. He rejects the muckraking theme of Upton Sinclair's 1905 novel The Jungle that vividly describes filthy and unsanitary practices that Pacyga says did not happen. He does not accept Sinclair's implication that the stockyards dehumanized the workers. Pacyga applauds the mechanized innovations introduced by the stockyards, which increased worker productivity and wages, while increasing the availability of inexpensive meat to most American families. The stockyards' reflected the Chicago business leaders' disapproval of organized labor. To avoid strikes the companies set up welfare programs and pensions. In all Pacyga depicts the rise of the stockyards as an American spectacle of the modern age, one that attracted millions of students and tourists to witness the dramatic scene of meat processing. Pacyga closes by tracing the stockyards' steady decline and disappearance in the 1950s as more profit could be made by moving the slaughtering closer to the western farms and ranches, using trucks instead of rail for transportation.

=== Back of the Yards Community ===
Settlement in the area that was to become known as the "Back of the Yards" began in the 1850s before there were any meat packers or stockyards in the area. At this time the area was known as the "Town of Lake," and the area newspaper was Town of Lake Journal. With the founding of the community organization "Back of the Yards Neighborhood Council" in 1939, the area started being called the "Back of the Yards". It was a name that the residents proudly claimed as their own. In 1939, the Town of Lake Journal officially changed its name to Back of the Yards Journal.

Pioneers to the neighborhood were S. S. Crocker and John Caffrey. Indeed, Crocker earned the nickname "Father of the Town of Lake". Incorporated in 1865 the area consisted of fewer than 700 persons. The overwhelming sensation given to visitors was the smell of the community caused not just by the packing plants located immediately to the east, but also by the 345-acre Chicago Union Stock Yards containing 2,300 pens of livestock, located further east from the packing plants.

== Decline and current use ==
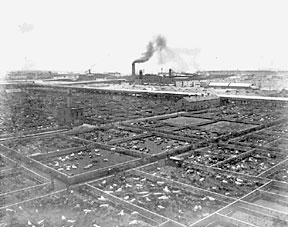
The Union Stock Yards Livestock Pens, 1880

The prosperity of the stockyards was the result of both the concentration of railroads and the evolution of refrigerated railroad cars. Its decline was caused by further advances in post–World War II transportation and distribution. Direct sales of livestock from breeders to packers, facilitated by advancement in interstate trucking, made it cheaper to slaughter animals where they were raised and excluded the intermediary stockyards. At first, the major meatpacking companies resisted change, but Swift and Armour both surrendered and vacated their plants in the Yards in the 1950s.

In 1971, the area bounded by Pershing Road, Ashland, Halsted, and 47th Street became The Stockyards Industrial Park. The neighborhood to the west and south of the industrial park is still known as Back of the Yards.

=== Gate ===
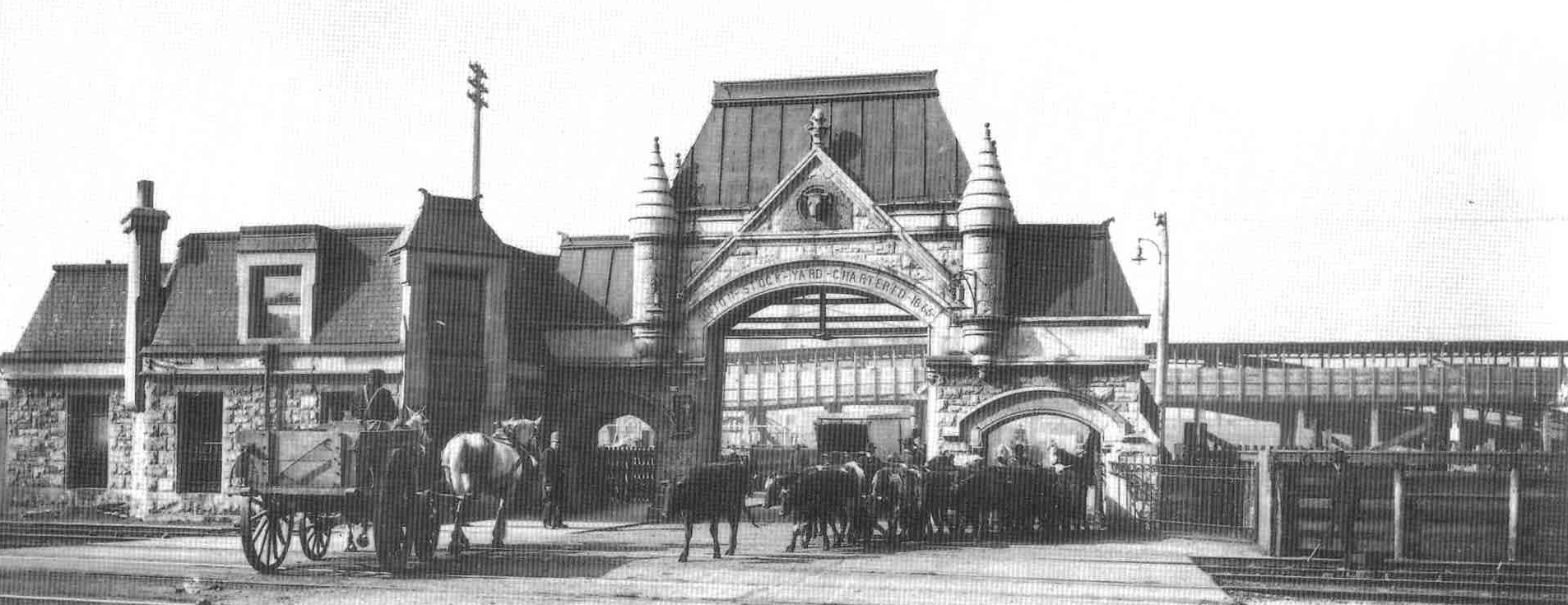
Entry to the Union Stock Yards

A remnant of the Union Stock Yard Gate still arches over Exchange Avenue, next to the firefighters' memorial. The gate was named a Chicago Landmark in 1972 and a National Historic Landmark in 1981. In addition to a Chicago Landmark plaque nearby, a historical marker with a history of the Stock Yards is immediately next to the gate. Another plaque affixed to the inside of the gate tells the story of the "Fallen 21," the firefighters who died in the 1910 fire.

This limestone gate survives as one of the few relics of Chicago's heritage of livestock and meatpacking. The bovine head decoration over the central arch is thought to represent "Sherman", a prize-winning bull named after John B. Sherman, a founder of the Union Stock Yard and Transit Company.

== Impact ==
The stockyards are considered one of the chief forces that molded the animal–industrial complex into its present form under contemporary capitalism. According to Kim Stallwood, Chicago and its stockyards from 1865 are one of the two milestones that mark the shift in human attitudes toward animals that empowered the animal–industrial complex, the other being the post–World War II developments such as intensive factory farms, industrial fishing, and xenotransplantation. According to sociologist David Nibert, the Chicago slaughterhouses were significant economic powers of the early 20th century and were "famous for the cruel, rapid-paced killing and disassembly of enormous numbers of animals."

== In popular culture ==
- In 1906 Upton Sinclair published The Jungle, describing the horrid conditions in the stockyards around the beginning of the 20th century.
- The stockyards are referred to in Carl Sandburg's poem Chicago: "proud to be Hog Butcher, Tool Maker, Stacker of Wheat, Player with Railroads and Freight Handler to the Nation."
- Frank Sinatra mentioned the yards in his 1964 song "My Kind of Town", and the stockyards receive a mention in the opening chapter of Thomas Pynchon's novel Against the Day.
- The Skip James song "Hard Times Killing Floor Blues" refers to the nickname of the slaughter part of the stockyards during the Great Depression in the 1930s.
- The Yards were a major tourist stop, with visitors such as Rudyard Kipling, Paul Bourget and Sarah Bernhardt.
- The play Saint Joan of the Stockyards, a version of the story of Joan of Arc by Bertolt Brecht, takes place in the stockyards.
- In J. M. Coetzee's novel Elizabeth Costello, the protagonist says, "Chicago showed us the way; it was from the Chicago stockyards that the Nazis learned how to process bodies."

== See also ==
- Chicago Board of Trade
- Chicago Livestock World
- Chicago Mercantile Exchange
- List of union stockyards in the United States

== Bibliography ==
- Abbott, Edith, and S. P. Breckinridge. "Women in Industry: The Chicago Stockyards." Journal of Political Economy 19#8 1911, pp. 632–54. online
- Anderson, John. "'Hog butcher for the world' opens shop." Chicago Tribune, January 30, 1997, Chicago ed.: sec. 2, p. 2.
- Barrett, James R. Work and Community in the Jungle: Chicago's Packinghouse Workers, 1894–1922 (University of Illinois Press, 1990).
- Chicago Historical Society. "Bibliography". Chicago Historical Society. 2001. Archived from the original on April 4, 2007.
- Cronon, William. Nature's Metropolis: Chicago and the Great West (2009).
- Grant, W. Jos. Illustrated History of the Union Stockyards. Chicago, 1901.
- Halpern, Rick. " Race, ethnicity, and union in the Chicago Stockyards, 1917–1922." International Review of Social History 37#1 1992, pp. 25–58. online
- Halpern, Rick. Down on the Killing Floor: Black and White Workers in Chicago's Packinghouses, 1904–54. (University of Illinois Press, 1997).
- Hirsch, Susan, and Robert I. Goler. A City Comes of Age: Chicago in the 1890s. Chicago: Chicago Historical Society, 1990.
- Holt, Glen E., and Dominic A. Pacyga. Chicago: A Historical Guide to the Neighborhoods: the Loop and South Side. (Chicago: Chicago Historical Society, 1979).
- Horowitz, Roger, Negro and White, Unite and Fight (University of Illinois Press, 1997).
- Jablonsky, Thomas J. Pride in the Jungle: Community and Everyday Life in Back of the Yards Chicago. Baltimore: Johns Hopkins University Press, 1993.
- Kennedy, John C. Wages and Family Budgets in the Chicago Stockyards District (1914)
- Klein, Aaron E., New York Central System (Smithmark Publishers, 1995).
- Liste, J. G., and George Schoettle. Union Stockyards Fire Photo Album. CHS: 1934.
- Mahoney, Olivia. Go West! Chicago and American Expansion. Chicago: Chicago Historical Society, 1999.
- McLaughlin, John Gerard, Irish Chicago (Arcadia Publishing: Charleston, South Carolina, 2003).
- Pacyga, Dominic A. Slaughterhouse: Chicago's Union Stock Yard and the World It Made (University of Chicago Press, 2018)
- Pacyga, Dominic A. Polish Immigrants and Industrial Chicago: Workers on the South Side, 1880–1922. Columbus: Ohio State University Press, 1991.
- Pacyga, Dominic, and Ellen Skerrett. Chicago: City of Neighborhoods. Chicago: Loyola University Press, 1986.
- Parkhurst, William. History of the Yards, 1865–1953. Chicago, 1953.
- Pate, J'Nell L., Livestock Hotels: America's Historic Stockyards (Texas Christian University Press: Fort Worth, Texas, 2005).
- Rice, William. "City creates nation's livestock center." Chicago Tribune, July 16, 1997, Chicago ed.: sec. 7, p. 7b.
- Skaggs, Jimmy. Prime Cut: Livestock Raising and Meatpacking in the U.S. College Station, Texas: Texas A&M University Press, 1986.
- Slayton, Robert A. Back of the Yards: The Making of a Local Democracy. (Chicago: The University of Chicago Press, 1986).
- Street, Paul. "The 'Best Union Members': Class, Race, Culture, and Black Worker Militancy in Chicago's Stockyards during the 1930s." Journal of American Ethnic History 20#1, 2000, pp. 18–49. online
- Street, Paul. "The Logic and Limits of 'Plant Loyalty': Black Workers, White Labor, and Corporate Racial Paternalism in Chicago's Stockyards, 1916-1940." Journal of Social History 29#3 1996, pp. 659–81. online
- Street, Paul. "Packinghouse Blues." Chicago History 18, no. 3 (1989): 68–85.
- Suh, Suk Bong. " Literature, Society, and Culture: Upton Sinclair and The Jungle" Ph.D. Dissertation, The University of Iowa; ProQuest Dissertations & Theses, 1986. 8622816_.
- Swist, Jeannette, Back of the Yards (Arcadia Publishing: 2007).
- Wade, Louise Carroll. Chicago's Pride: The Stockyards, Packingtown, and Environs in the Nineteenth Century (University of Illinois Press, 1987) major scholarly study down to 1900.
