= Eugene Kusielewicz =

American historian

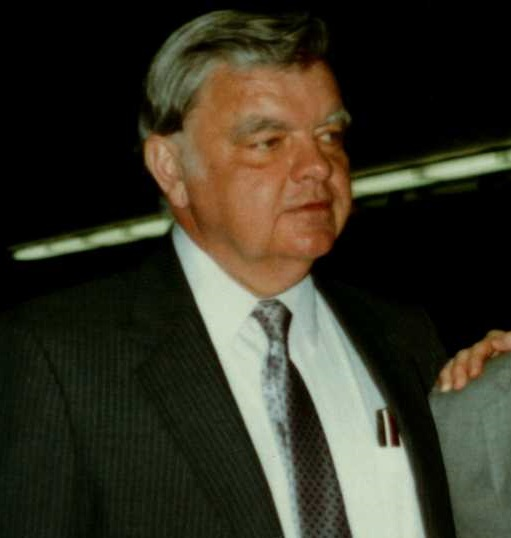
- Born: October 12, 1930; Brooklyn, New York, New York, U.S.
- Died: December 10, 1996 (aged 66); Highmount, New York, U.S.
- Occupation: Historian
- Writing career
- Period: 1954–1996
- Subjects: Polish-American History, Polish History

Eugene Francis Vincent Kusielewicz (October 12, 1930 – December 10, 1996) was an American historian, author, educator, and a leading spokesperson on Polish and Polish-American affairs in the United States.

== Life and recognition ==
Born on October 12, 1930, in Brooklyn, New York, Kusielewicz attended St. John's University (B.A., 1952), where he was inducted into the Skull and Circle Honor Society. While at St. John's, he was also a two-time winner of the Judge Albert Conway History Essay Contest. He then attended Fordham University (M.A., 1954; Ph.D., 1963), where he studied under Oskar Halecki, the Polish historian. Under Halecki's guidance, he wrote his Master's thesis on "Woodrow Wilson, Ignacy Paderewski, and the Rebirth of Poland." His doctoral dissertation was on the "Teschen Question at the Paris Peace Conference: A Re-examination in the Light of Materials in the Archives of the United States."

Kusielewicz began his teaching career in 1953 and worked at both public and private schools, before receiving a faculty appointment in the History Department at St. John's University in 1955. He taught at St. John's until his retirement and reached the rank of associate professor. At St. John's, he supervised the doctoral dissertations of the Rev. Zdzisław M. Musialik, a Catholic priest and historian affiliated with the Józef Piłsudski Institute of America, Stanley S. Seidner, and Zofia Sywak. He was also thanked by Francis A. Ierace for being his mentor in his 1978 book America and the Nazi-Soviet Pact, which was based on his master's thesis.

Aside from his teaching duties, Kusielewicz was involved in numerous Polish-American groups. He was president of the Polish American Historical Association from 1964 to 1966, and also editor of the organization's scholarly journal, Polish American Studies, from 1964 to 1968. He also spent two decades as an officer of the Kosciuszko Foundation, first as assistant to the president (Stephen Mizwa) from 1963 to 1965, then vce president (1965–1970), and then president (1970–1979). Kusielewicz also served as the editor of the Foundation's Monthly Newsletter, and had earlier written a weekly column for the Polish American World, a newspaper that he had helped to found. In later years, he contributed columns to the Polish-American Journal.

Kusielewicz received the Haiman Medal from the Polish American Historical Association for "outstanding contributions in the field of Polish American Studies," and received Distinguished Service awards from the Polish government as well as from local civic organizations. He was appointed as a Trustee of the Brooklyn Public Library, and was inducted in 1988 into the Knights of Malta.

== Scholarship ==
Kusielewicz specialized in the rebirth of Poland at the end of World War I, and contributed numerous articles on aspects of that to both the Polish Review and Polish American Studies. He contributed book reviews to American Slavic and East European Review, Catholic Historical Review, Polish Review, Catholic Educator, Journal of Central European Affairs, East Europe, and Perspectives.

Kusielewicz served as editor of Twayne Publishers' Library of Polish Studies, which brought several important works back into print and made others available to English readers. He was the writer and chief historical consultant for a series of seventeen half-hour films on Polish American life produced by Polish Television to celebrate the American Bicentennial.

Kusielewicz was also critical of the often negative ways that Poles and Polish Americans were portrayed in the media, which was a topic for a few of his essays and book chapters. He was also an outspoken defender of the Carmelite nuns whose convent at the Auschwitz death camp had provoked widespread controversy. Kusielewicz appeared on both the CNBC program "McLaughlin" and the PBS show "John McLaughlin's One on One" to defend the nuns.

== Publications ==
Books authored/edited by Kusielewicz:

- Reflections on the Cultural Condition of the Polish American Community (Czas Publishing Co., 1969).
- A Tribute to Stephen P. Mizwa (Czas Publishing Co., 1972).
- (co-editor with pl:Hieronim Kubiak and Thaddeus Gromada) Polonia Amerykańska: Przeszłość i Współczesność (Zakład Narodowy Imienia Ossolińskich Wydawnictwo Polskiej Akademii Nauk, 1988).
- (co-editor with pl:Marian Marek Drozdowski) Polonia Stanów Zjednoczonych Ameryki 1910-1918: Wybór documentów (Ludowa Spółdzielnia Wydawnicza, 1989).
