= Mieczysław B. Biskupski =

Polish-American historian and political scientist

Mieczysław B. Biskupski (born 1948) is a Polish-American historian and political scientist, with focus on Central European (particularly Polish) history and international relations.

He has held professorship appointments at St. John Fisher College, the University of Rochester, and the University of Warsaw. In 1997 he was a Fellow of the Central European University in Budapest, Hungary. In 2002 he became the Endowed Chair in Polish and Polish-American Studies at Central Connecticut State University. He left the university in 2024.

He received his Ph.D. in 1981 from Yale University.

Biskupski's academic and national awards include listing on the Honor Roll of Polish Learning by the Polish Ministry of Education (2001), and the Officer's Cross of the Order of Merit of the Republic of Poland (2000). In 2004 he received the Mieczysław Haiman Award from the Polish American Historical Association. He is a member of the board of directors of the Polish Institute of Arts and Sciences of America; and has served as a member of the board of directors of the Józef Piłsudski Institute of America, and as president of the Polish American Historical Association.

He is the author of several books and numerous articles.

== Works ==
- Mieczysław B. Biskupski (1981). The United States and the rebirth of Poland, 1914-1918. Yale University.
- Mieczysław B. Biskupski (1989). American Polonia and the resurrection of independent Poland, 1914-1918. Polish Studies Program, Central Connecticut State University.
- Mieczysław B. Biskupski (1990). Re-creating Central Europe: the United States "inquiry" into the future of Poland in 1918. Simon Fraser University.
- Mieczysław B. Biskupski; James S. Pula (1990). Polish democratic thought from the Renaissance to the great emigration: essays and documents. East European Monographs. ISBN 978-0-88033-186-9.
- Mieczysław B. Biskupski (1993). Poland and Europe: historical dimensions. Columbia Univ. Press.
- Mieczysław B. Biskupski; Antony Polonsky (January 2007). Polish-Jewish relations in North America. Littman Library of Jewish Civilization. ISBN 978-1-874774-96-9.
- Mieczysław B. Biskupski (2000). The history of Poland. Greenwood Publishing Group. ISBN 978-0-313-30571-9.
- Mieczysław B. Biskupski; Piotr Stefan Wandycz (2003). Ideology, politics, and diplomacy in East Central Europe. University Rochester Press. ISBN 978-1-58046-137-5.
- Mieczysław B. Biskupski (8 January 2010). Hollywood's war with Poland, 1939-1945. University Press of Kentucky. ISBN 978-0-8131-2559-6.
- Independence Day: Myth, Symbol, and the Creation of Modern Poland (2012)
