= Polish People's University in Philadelphia =

US organization of the Polish diaspora

Polish People's University
- Polski Uniwersytet Ludowy
- Abbreviation: PUL
- Established: March 1918; 108 years ago
- Founder: Stefan Sieradzki
- Founded at: Philadelphia, Pennsylvania
- Legal status: 501(c)(3) Nonprofit Organization
- Purpose: Educating Polish Americans in science and humanities
- Headquarters: Associated Polish Home, 9150 Academy Rd, Philadelphia, PA 19114
- Location: Philadelphia, Pennsylvania, USA
- Coordinates: 40°03′21″N 75°00′30″W
- president: Dr. Margaret M. Zaleska
- Board of directors: Dr. Jan F. Zaleski, Dr. Aleksandra Ziółkowska-Boehm, Hubert Kojer, Mariola M. Marcinkiewicz, Edward Masternak, Marie Hejnosz
- Parent organization: Polish American Congress
- Website: https://www.polishpeoplesuniversity.org

The Polish People's University (Polish: Polski Uniwersytet Ludowy, PUL) is a cultural organization of the Polish diaspora in the United States, established in 1918, located in Philadelphia. It organizes educational lectures for the Polish-American community in both English and Polish. Since its foundation, PUL has delivered over 450 such lectures.

PUL collaborates with other organizations of the Polish immigrants. It is affiliated with the Polish American Congress, an umbrella organization of Polish-American organizations. Since 1972, PUL is a member organization of the Polish American Historical Association (PAHA).

In 2024, the activities of PUL were covered in Nowy Dziennik (New Daily), a Polish language newspaper published in the U. S.

== Mission ==
Since its inception, the Polish People's University (PUL) is dedicated to spreading knowledge about Polish culture and history among Polish-Americans in Philadelphia and the surrounding area. Additionally, PUL serves as an integration center, promoting social connections within Polonia. On the official website, the organization states:

Our mission is to promote Polish history, culture, and national traditions through educational lectures and meetings.

Historically, the organization also strived to provide Polish-Americans with knowledge useful for new immigrants such as job search and navigating the American institutions (schools, offices, etc.). In early 1950s, the mission of PUL was:

The goal of the Polish People's University in Philadelphia is cultural/lecture activity among the Polish community in and around Philadelphia. This activity can be expressed as follows:

1. serving scientific lectures in all branches of knowledge;
2. celebrating national holidays and organizing cultural events;
3. support and promotion of Polish scientific institutions abroad, as well as Polish books and magazines;
4. collaboration with similar organizations in the fields of education and culture.

— Goals of the Polish People's University in Philadelphia (Note: Translated from the following Polish original: Celem Polskiego Uniwersytetu Ludowego w Filadelfii jest działalność kulturalno-odczytowa wśród Polonii w Filadelfii i okolicy. Działalność tę można ująć w następujących punktach: 1. organizowanie odczytów na tematy naukowe z wszystkich dziedzin wiedzy; 2. urządzanie obchodów narodowych i imprez kulturalnych; 3. popieranie i propagowanie polskich instytucji naukowych na obczyźnie, polskich książek i polskich czasopism; 4. współpraca na polu oświatowym i kulturalnym z innymi organizacjami o podobnym charakterze.)

== History ==
The history of PUL can be divided into several periods, roughly correlated with the several waves of immigration from Poland.

=== Background ===
At the turn of the 19th and 20th centuries, educational organizations called folk universities or people's universities were established in Central Europe, inspired by the work of N. F. S. Grundtvig. Such organizations sprouted in the Polish territories during the years preceding World War I. The idea was then transplanted by the Polish immigrants to the U. S. during the 1870–1914 wave of immigration. Polish-language people's universities (educational societies) were established in Illinois, Indiana, Michigan, New Jersey, New York, Ohio and Wisconsin.

=== Early Years (1918-1928) ===
The Polish People's University (PUL) was organized in 1918 in Philadelphia by Stefan Sieradzki and Alfred Starzewski. The first meeting of the new organization was held in August 1918 in the Lithuanian Hall in Port Richmond. Soon, the organization had about 200 members.

During that period, PUL was aligned with the socialist movement; particularly, with Polish Socialists Union branch No. 5 in Philadelphia. Jan Kozakiewicz, the editor of the Polish-language weekly newspaper "Robotnik" (Worker) delivered the inaugural lecture. Alfred Starzewski served as the secretary of the organization. Unfortunately, the activities ceased after this period due to the Great Depression and World War II.

=== Rebirth (1948-1950) ===
After World War II, PUL was reactivated by Stefan Sieradzki. He was joined by several new activists: Stefan Rojewski (secretary), Stanislaw Gardiasz, Waclaw Gawrysiak and Edward Zając. The organization found a new permanent home in the Associated Polish Home (Academy Road, Philadelphia).

=== Cold War years (1950-1980) ===
During the Cold War years, PUL was led by Włodzimierz J. Denkowski, a veteran of World War II and the Warsaw Uprising of 1944. He held the position of the secretary for over 20 years. During that period, the organization reached its peak activity, delivering more than 250 lectures. Some prominent lecturers were:

- General Tadeusz Bór-Komorowski (military leader, statesman)
- Hilary Koprowski (physician, scientist)
- Karol Estreicher (art historian, writer)
- Jan Karski (WWII hero, diplomat)
- Oskar Halecki (historian)
- Ludwik Krzyżanowski (educator)

=== Solidarity and the Martial-law immigration (1981-1986) ===
The Solidarity movement in Poland resulted in a brief (1980–1981) opening in the Iron Curtain. However, it was soon countered by the Communist authorities who imposed the brutal martial law. These events generated a new wave of immigration from Poland to the U. S. This time, many new immigrants were well educated and skilled, which added new energy to the Polish ethnic organizations in the U. S., and PUL benefited from it, too. In years 1981–1986, PUL was led first by Józef Koćmierowski, and then by Jadwiga Kulpińska-Bogucka. In that period the following notable speakers gave lectures for PUL:

- Stefan Niewiarowski (biomedical scientist)
- Zbigniew Darzynkiewicz (biologist)
- Hieronim Wyszyński (journalist)
- Miron Wolnicki (economist)
- Peter Bogucki (archaeologist)

=== New Generation of Voices (1986-2009) ===
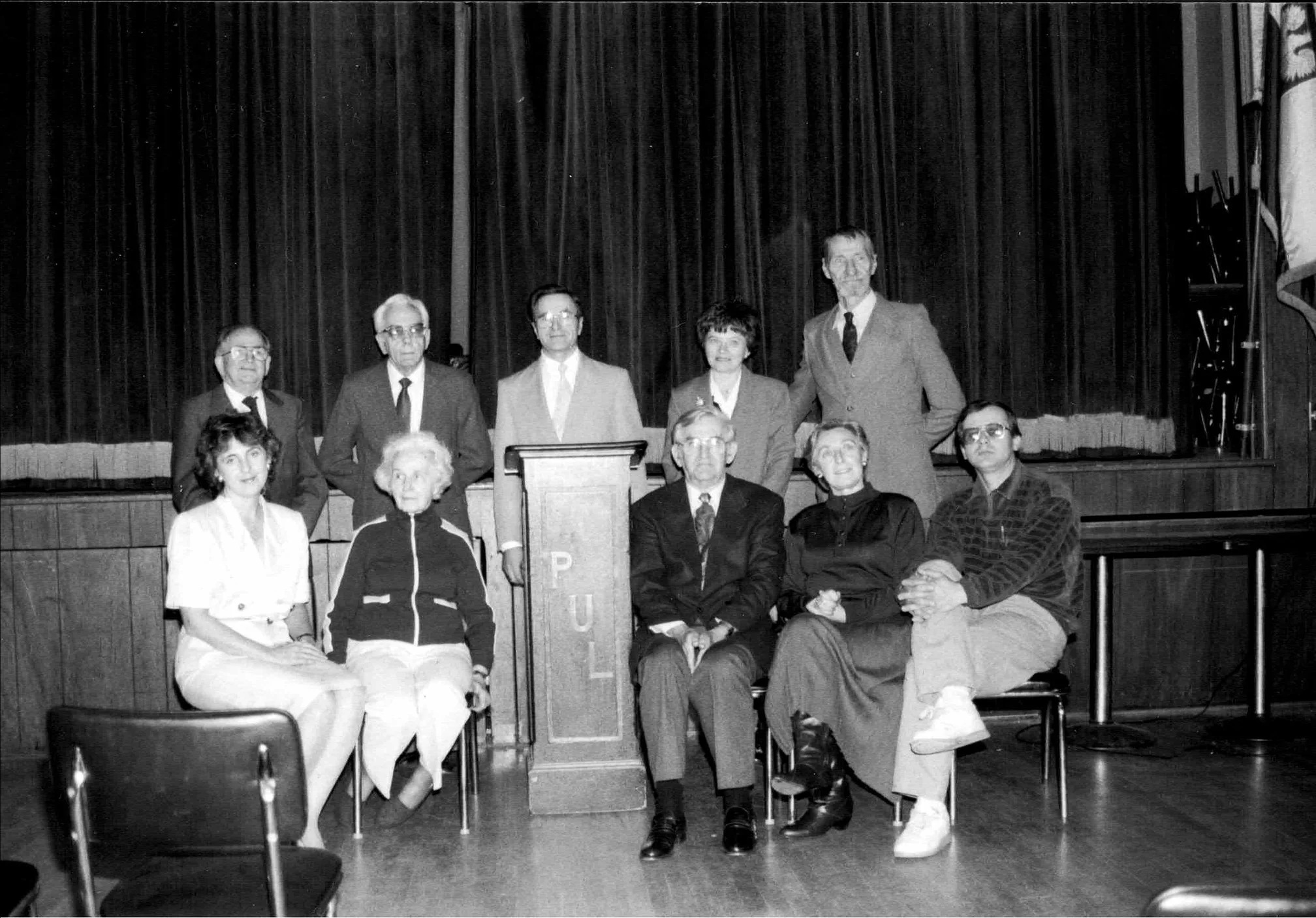
The Board of the Polish People's University in Philadelphia in 1994 (Note: 1994 Board. Standing from left: Bonifacy Obst, Kazimierz Zachodny, Józef Rzeźnik, Irena Kotarska, George Kołodziej. Sitting from left: Teresa Kozłowska, Jadwiga Bogucka, Włodzimierz Denkowski, Janina Zagórska, Zenon Marcyniuk.)

The next period saw Poland restored as a free country (1989), while the Soviet bloc fell apart (1990–1991). Those historical events were followed by Poland's access to NATO (1999) and the European Union (2004). During that period, PUL was led by Dr. Józef Rzeźnik, a Polish engineer educaed at the Warsaw University of Technology. Under his leadership, helped by the board of directors (Note: In 1994 the Board included: Jadwiga Bogucka, Włodzimierz Denkowski, Bonifacy Obst, Kazimierz Zachodny, Barbara and Zenon Marcyniuk, Teresa and Kazimierz Kozłowski, Irena Kotarska, Nina Zagorska, Regina Gorzkowska-Rossi, and Drs. Janusz and Małgorzata Romański.), PUL delivered 155 lectures. The topics included: Politics and History, Culture and Arts, and Society and Science. During that period, among many PUL lecturers were the following prominent Polish intellectuals:

- Jan Nowak-Jeziorański (journalist, diplomat)
- Jacek Kalabiński (journalist)
- Jerzy Surdykowski (writer, diplomat)
- Kazimierz Dziewanowski (writer, diplomat)
- Piotr Wandycz (historian)
- Tadeusz Gromada (historian)
- Krzysztof Kasprzyk (nuclear physicist, journalist, diplomat)
- Jerzy Koźmiński (economist, diplomat)

=== Modernization and the Centennial (2009–2019) ===
In the next 10-year period, Dr. Janusz Romański, an engineer and Polonia activist, was the president of PUL. During that time, PUL upgraded its lecture technology, completed its legal status as a non-profit organization, and celebrated its Centennial in March 2019. Notable lecturers during this time included:

- Andrzej Pityński (sculptor)
- Iwona Korga (historian, educator)
- James S. Pula (historian)
- Aleksandra Ziółkowska-Boehm (writer)
- Andrzej J. Dąbrowski (theater director)
- Janusz Romański (engineer)

=== Digital Expansion (2019–Present) ===
In 2019, Dr. Margaret M. Zaleska was elected the president of PUL. Zaleska is an accomplished neurobiologist. Under her leadership PUL got its official website. The lectures are digitized and archived. Notable speakers during this period include:

- Elizabeth Gosek (financial planner)
- Teofil Lachowicz (historian)
- Danuta Piątkowska (writer, historian)
- Jarosław Anders (writer)
- Fr. Tadeusz Lizyńczyk, OSPPE (member of the convent in American Częstochowa, Doylestown, PA)
- Paul Krzywicki (musician)
- Małgorzata Piszcz-Connelly (physician)
- Ewa Zadrzyńska-Głowacka (journalist, writer)
- Rafał Kościański (historian)
