= Pul =

Pul or PUL may refer to:

- Pul (coin), historical Russian copper coin
- Pul, Iran, a city in Mazandaran Province, Iran
- Pul, Kerman, a village in Kerman Province, Iran
- Afghan pul, one 1/100 of the Afghan afghani (currency)
- Pul, alternative name of the Assyrian king Tiglath-Pileser III
- Polish People's University in Philadelphia
- Polyurethane laminate
- Pregnancy of unknown location, a form of ectopic pregnancy that cannot be located through ultrasound imaging
- Premier Ultimate League, a women's professional ultimate disc league
- Press Union of Liberia
- Presses universitaires de Louvain, the publisher of the University of Louvain in Louvain-la-Neuve, Belgium
- Protestant, unionist, loyalist people in Northern Ireland
