= Stanislaus A. Blejwas =

Polish-American historian (1941–2001)

Stanislaus Andrew Blejwas (5 October 1941 – 23 September 2001) was an American historian specializing in modern Polish history.

== Early life ==
He was of Polish descent and born in Brooklyn, New York to Stanisław and Catherine (Komorowski) Blejwas. He received a B.A., summa cum laude, in 1963 from Providence College, and the M.A. (1966) and Ph.D. (1973) from Columbia University.

== Career ==
Starting in 1974, Blejwas spent most of his career researching and teaching at Central Connecticut State University. in 1979, he was promoted to associate professor at CCSU.

In 1987, at CCSU he held the Endowed Chair in Polish and Polish American Studies that was later named after him.

In 1989, he elevated to university professor at CCSU.

In 1996 Blejwas received the Order of Merit of the Republic of Poland.

== Personal life ==
Blejwas was married to Lucy for 35 years, and together they had two children, Andrzej and Carol.

== Death ==
Blejwas died suddenly on September 23, 2001, at his home in Canton, Connecticut, at the age of 59.

== Awards ==
- 1974 - Kościuszko Foundation Doctoral Dissertation Award
- Grant from the Connecticut Humanities Council
- 1982 - NEH (National Endowment for the Humanities) fellowship
- Mieczysław Haiman Medal of the Polish American Historical Association for contributions to the field
- Grant from the Kościuszko Foundation and Polish Ministry of Education for research at the Polish State Archives and Polish Foreign Ministry Archives
- Distinguished service award from the Polish American Historical Association
- Appointed president of the Polish American Historical Association in 2001

== Holocaust Memorial Work ==
- June 1994 - President Clinton appointed him to the United States Holocaust Memorial Council
- Served on the council's Research Committee
- Re-appointed to a second term by President Clinton in 1999
