= Thaddeus Gromada =

Polish-American historian (1929–2025)

Thaddeus Vladimir Gromada (30 July 1929 – 10 August 2025) was a Polish-American historian. He was a professor emeritus of European history at the New Jersey City University, an executive director and president of the Polish Institute of Arts & Sciences of America (PIASA) and the Polish American Historical Association and a trustee and vice-chair of The Kosciuszko Foundation. His scholarly interests were focused on areas such as the history of Poland and Polish-Americans in the 20th-century.

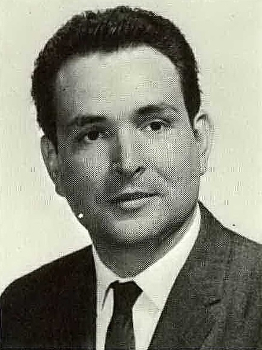
Dr. Thaddeus V. Gromada, 1968

== Life and career ==
Gromada was born in Passaic, New Jersey, on 30 July 1929. He received a B.S. from Seton Hall University in 1951, before then studying at Fordham University, where he received both the M.A. (1953) and Ph.D. (1966). At Fordham, he studied under Oskar Halecki. His doctoral dissertation, "The Slovak Question in Polish Foreign Policy, 1934-1939," was supervised by the Rev. Casimir C. Gecys, since Halecki had retired by the time that Gromada finished.

He began teaching at what was then known as Jersey City State College in 1959, being promoted to associate professor in 1966, and to professor in 1969.

Gromada died on 10 August 2025, at the age of 96.
