= Charles S. Kraszewski =

Polish-American professor, Slavicist, and translator

Charles S. Kraszewski (born 1962) is a Polish-American professor, Slavicist, and English translator from Polish, Czech, Slovak, Greek, and Latin; and translator from English into Polish.

== Career ==
In 2008–2011 Kraszewski was editor-in-chief of The Polish Review, the scholarly quarterly of the Polish Institute of Arts and Sciences of America, headquartered in New York City.

His original poetry has been published in literary journals including Red River Review, Chaparral, Poetry South, and OVS. He has published two volumes of poetry: Beast (Plan B Press, 2013), and Diet of Nails (červená barva, 2013).

His critical works include Irresolute Heresiarch: Catholicism, Gnosticism and Paganism in the Poetry of Czesław Miłosz, CSP, 2012; and a collection of verse translations, Rossetti's Armadillo, 2013.

Kraszewski translates into English and Polish. His translations of T.S. Eliot and Robinson Jeffers into Polish have appeared in the Wrocław-based journal Odra. He has also translated the work of Polish Romantic poet and playwright Juliusz Słowacki in "Four Plays: Mary Stuart, Kordian, Balladyna, Horsztynski" (Glagoslav Publications, 2018).

== Recognition ==
- Union of Polish Writers Abroad award (London, 2013).

== See also ==
- Polish American
