= Oskar Halecki =

Polish historian (1891–1973)

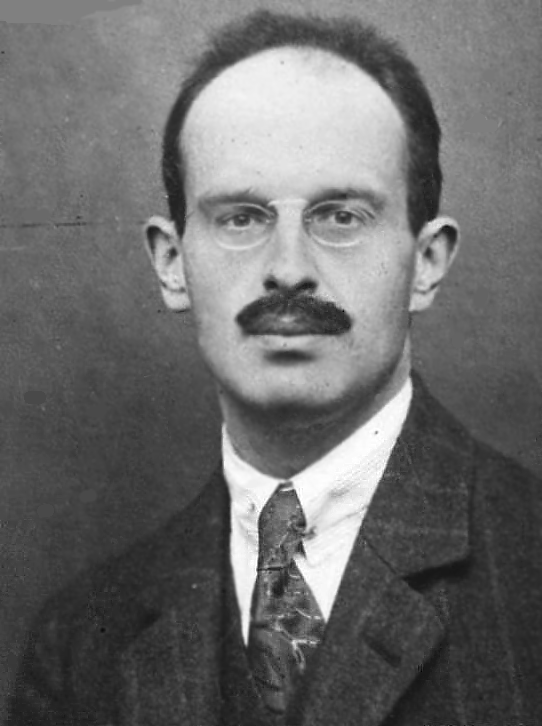
- Halecki in 1936
- Born: 26 May 1891; Vienna, Cisleithania, Austria-Hungary
- Died: 17 September 1973 (aged 82); White Plains, New York, United States

Academic background
- Education: Jagiellonian University

Oskar Halecki (26 May 1891 – 17 September 1973) was a Polish Catholic historian and social activist who was made a doctor honoris causa of the Polish University Abroad (1973).

== Life and career ==
Halecki, whose first name is sometimes spelled "Oscar" in English-language sources, was born in Vienna. His father, Oscar Chalecki-Halecki, was a Polish officer who served in the Austrian Army and achieved the rank of lieutenant field-marshal, and his mother was Leopoldina deDellimanic.

After graduating with a doctorate from the Jagiellonian University (1909–1913), Haleckiserved briefly as a research assistant to Bronisław Dembiński in Warsaw and continued his education at the University of Vienna (1914–1915). He secured his first teaching position in 1915 as a docent at his alma mater, the Jagiellonian University. He was disqualified from military service from poor eyesight. In his early years, Halecki wore pince-nez, which, combined with his mustache, gave him an aristocratic appearance. Halecki moved to Warsaw University in 1918, where he was appointed to a chair of Eastern European history.

After the Armistice was signed, Halecki was appointed secretary general of a committee of experts attached to the Polish delegation at the Paris Peace Conference. Even though he had been appointed as dean of the Faculty of Philosophy at the Jagiellonian University (1920), Halecki spent a decade in international service. In 1921, he was appointed as a member of the League of Nations Secretariat in Geneva, where he spent three years organising that body's International Committee on Intellectual Cooperation. Halecki then spent a year in Paris as Chief of the University Section in the International Institute on Intellectual Co-operation and spent several years working on its various commissions. After a ten-year absence, he returned to his professorship at the University of Warsaw until 1939 and meanwhile served as dean of the Faculty of Humanities (1930–1931). In 1938, he went to the United States as a visiting scholar of the Kosciuszko Foundation and gave over forty lectures at colleges and universities.

Halecki was attending a conference in Fribourg when Germany invaded Poland, which triggered the Second World War. Rather than returning to occupied Poland, he went to Paris, where he organized the Polish University Abroad and served as its president, taught at the Sorbonne and edited the émigré periodical La Voix de Varsovie. When Germany invaded France in 1940, Halecki escaped to the United States with the help of Stephen Mizwa and the Kosciuszko Foundation, where he spent two years as a visiting professor of history at Vassar College before he became executive director of the new Polish Institute of Arts and Sciences of America, which was conceived as an American outpost of the Polish Academy of Learning. Its first president was Bronisław Malinowski, and Halecki became its president from 1952 to 1964.

Halecki became a professor of Eastern European history at Fordham University from 1944 to 1961. He was also affiliated with the University of Montreal from 1944 to 1951 and an adjunct professor at Columbia University from 1955 to 1961, where he contributed to the prestige of Columbia's Institute on East Central Europe. After his "retirement" in 1961, he was a visiting professor at Loyola University in Rome (1962–1963), University of Fribourg (1963), University of California at Los Angeles (1963–1964), and Good Counsel College (1964–1967).

As a historian, Halecki was an expert on the Polish–Lithuanian Commonwealth, which laid the foundation for his thesis that Eastern Europe, distinct from Russia, was no less European than Western Europe and that both were part of one great European community of people, which shared the same spiritual ideals and cultural traditions. His work led to the gradual acceptance of the concept and name of East Central Europe. His magnum opus was a two-volume history of the Jagiellonian Union that was published in 1919–1920. Much of his retirement was occupied with working on a biography of Queen Jadwiga of Anjou that was published two decades after his death.

Halecki also served on the controversial Committee of Ten in Scarsdale, New York, which claimed communist influence in the public school curriculum in the 1950s.

Among the many students he mentored were Thaddeus V. Gromada, Taras Hunczak, and Eugene Kusielewicz.

Halecki married Helen de Sulima-Szarlowska, who died in 1964.

== Honors and recognition ==
Halecki received honorary doctorates from the University of Lyon, the University of Montreal, De Paul University, Fordham University, and Saint Peter's College. He was Papal Chamberlain and Knight of the Grand Cross, Order of Malta; Commander of the Order of Polonia Restituta; Commander of Saint Gregory; Commander, Hungarian Croix de Merite; and Chevalier, Légion d'honneur. He received the Polish American Historical Association's first Haiman Award (1966) for outstanding contributions to Polish American studies. In 1981, the Polish American Historical Association established the Halecki Prize, given to recognize an important book or monograph on the Polish experience in the United States.

== Bibliography ==
Publications by Halecki:

- Dzieje unii jagiellońskiej (2 vols., 1919-1920).
- (fr) Un empereur de Byzance æ Rome : vingt ans de travail pour l'union des églises et pour la défense de l'empire d'orient : 1355 - 1375 (1930)
- (fr) Rome et Byzance au temps du grand schisme d'occident (1937)
- East Central Europe in postwar organization (1943)
- The Crusade of Varna: A Discussion of Controversial Problems (1943)
- Borderlands of Western Civilization: A History of East Central Europe (1952) (ISBN 0-9665734-8-X)
- History of Poland (ISBN 0-679-51087-7)
- (fr) Histoire de Pologne (1945)
- Imperialism in Slavic and East European History (1952)
- Pius XII: Eugenio Pacelli: Pope of peace (1954)
- From Florence to Brest 1439–1596 (1958)
- The Limits and Divisions of European History (1962)
- The Millennium of Europe (1963)
- (posthumous) Jadwiga of Anjou and the rise of East Central Europe, edited by Thaddeus V. Gromada (1991)

Publications about Halecki:

- The American Catholic Who's Who, Vol. 14: 1960 and 1961.
- Thaddeus V. Gromada, "The Contributions of Oscar Halecki to American Historical Scholarship," Nationalities Papers, Vol. 4, no. 2 (1976): 89–97.
- Thaddeus V. Gromada, "Oscar Halecki, 1891-1973," Slavic Review, Vol. 33, no. 1 (1974): 203-204 in JSTOR.
- Oskar Halecki, "Oskar Halecki, Historian," in Walter Romig (ed.), The Book of Catholic Authors (Third Series): Informal Self-Portraits of Famous Modern Catholic Writers (Walter Romig & Co., 1945), 157–163.
- Kenneth F. Lewalski, "Oscar Halecki," in Hans A. Schmitt (ed.), Historians of Modern Europe (Louisiana State University Press, 1971), 36–61.
- Justine Wincek, "Oscar Halecki," Polish American Studies, Vol. 24, no. 2 (1967): 106-108 in JSTOR.
- Thaddeus V. Gromada (ed.), Oskar Halecki 1891-1973: Eulogies and Reflections (Tatra Eagle Press, 2013).
- Королёв Геннадий. Antemurale польской историографии: Оскар Халецкий о ягеллонской идее, федерализме и пограничье Запада // Ab Imperio. – 2015. – No. 2. – С. 363–382.
