= Jadwiga of Poland =

Queen of Poland from 1384 to 1399

Jadwiga
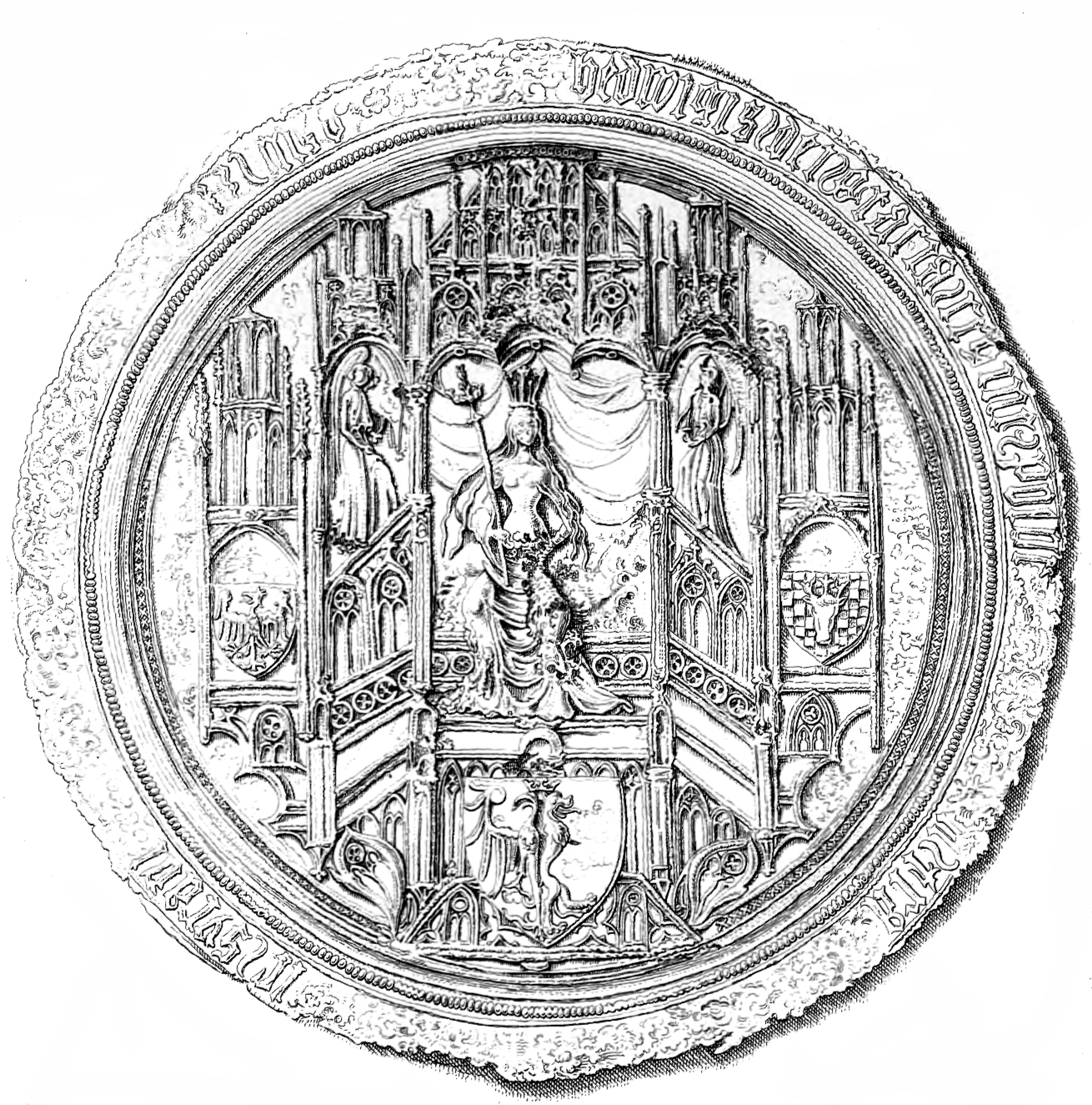
- Effigy of Jadwiga on her seal

Queen of Poland (Note: Although crowned as king (rex) of Poland, Jadwiga was usually referred to as queen (regina) in the sources, being called king (rex) only occasionally to emphasize her status.)
- Reign: 16 October 1384 – 17 July 1399
- Coronation: 16 October 1384; Wawel Cathedral, Kraków
- Predecessor: Louis I of Hungary
- Successor: Władysław II Jagiełło
- Co-ruler: Władysław II Jagiełło (1386–1399)

Grand Duchess consort of Lithuania
- Tenure: 18 February 1386 – 17 July 1399
- Born: Between 3 October 1373 and 18 February 1374; Buda, Hungary
- Died: 17 July 1399 (aged 25); Kraków, Poland
- Burial: 24 August 1399; Wawel Cathedral, Kraków
- Spouse: Władysław II Jagiełło (m. 1386)
- Issue: Elizabeth Bonifacia
- House: Capetian House of Anjou
- Father: Louis I of Hungary
- Mother: Elizabeth of Bosnia

Jadwiga (Polish: [jadˈviɡa]; 1373/1374 – 17 July 1399), also known as Hedwig (from German, Hungarian: Hedvig), was Queen of the Kingdom of Poland, as well as its last hereditary ruler. Crowned "King" (in regem Poloniae coronata) to highlight her sovereign status, she reigned from 16 October 1384 until her death. Born in Buda, she was the youngest daughter of Louis I of Hungary and Elizabeth of Bosnia. Jadwiga was a member of the Capetian House of Anjou and had forebears among the Polish Piasts.

In 1375, Louis I of Hungary planned for Jadwiga to marry William of Austria, to whom she was symbolically married in 1378; she subsequently lived in Vienna from 1378 to 1380. Louis is sometimes thought to have regarded her and William as his favoured successors in Hungary after the 1378 death of her eldest sister, Catherine of Hungary, since the following year the Polish nobility had pledged their homage to Louis I's second daughter, Mary, and her fiancé, Sigismund of Luxembourg. However, in 1382, Louis I died and his widow, Elizabeth of Bosnia, had Mary crowned "King of Hungary". Sigismund of Luxembourg tried to take control of Poland, but the Polish nobility countered that they would only be obedient to a daughter of Louis I, provided she settled in Poland. Elizabeth then chose Jadwiga to reign in Poland, but did not send her to Kraków to be crowned. During the interregnum, Siemowit IV, Duke of Masovia, became a candidate for the Polish throne. The nobility of Greater Poland favoured him and proposed that he marry Jadwiga. However, Lesser Poland's nobility opposed him, and they persuaded Elizabeth to send Jadwiga to Poland.

Jadwiga was crowned "King" in Poland's capital, Kraków, on 16 October 1384. With her mother's consent, Jadwiga's advisors opened negotiations with Władysław II Jagiełło, Grand Duke of Lithuania, concerning his potential marriage to Jadwiga. Władysław II Jagiełło, who was a pagan, signed the Union of Krewo, pledging to convert to Catholicism and to promote the conversion of his pagan subjects. Meanwhile, William hastened to Kraków, hoping to make his childhood wedding with Jadwiga valid by consummation of their union, but the Polish nobles expelled him in late August 1385.

Władysław II Jagiełło (Jogaila), who took the Catholic baptismal name Władysław, married Jadwiga on 15 February 1386, after she renounced her union with William. Legend says that she had agreed to marry him only after a lengthy prayer, seeking divine inspiration. Jogaila, now styled in Polish as Władysław II Jagiełło, was crowned King of Poland on 4 March 1386 as Jadwiga's co-ruler. Władysław II Jagiełło worked closely with his wife in that role. In any case, her real political power was limited. She remained passive when the rebellious nobles of the Kingdom of Hungary-Croatia murdered her mother in early 1387. After that, Jadwiga marched into the Kingdom of Galicia–Volhynia, which had been under Hungarian rule, and persuaded most of the inhabitants to become subjects of the Polish Crown. She mediated between her husband's quarrelling kin and between Poland and the Teutonic Order.

After her sister Mary died in 1395, Jadwiga and Władysław II Jagiełło laid claim to Hungary against the widowed Sigismund of Luxembourg, but the Hungarian lords did not support their claim. Jadwiga died four years later due to postpartum complications. As her only daughter predeceased her, the Queen was the last hereditary monarch of Poland, and with her death, the throne of Poland became elective. In 1997, she was canonised by the Catholic Church.

== Childhood (1373/1374 – 1382) ==
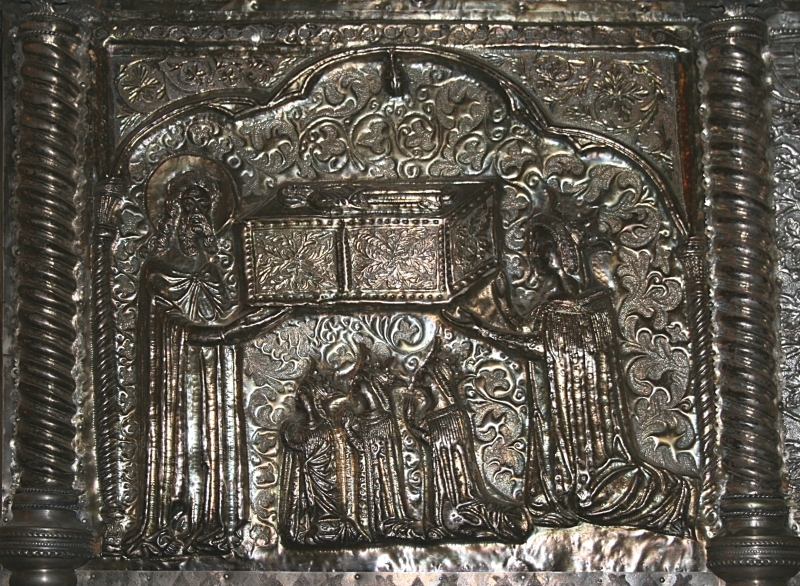
Jadwiga with her mother and sisters, as depicted on Saint Simeon's casket in Zadar

Jadwiga was born in Buda, the capital of the Kingdom of Hungary. She was the third and youngest daughter of Louis I, King of Hungary and Poland, and his second wife, Elizabeth of Bosnia. Both her grandmothers were Polish princesses, connecting her to the native Piast dynasty of Poland. Polish historian Oscar Halecki concluded in his posthumously published work (1991) that Jadwiga's "genealogical tree clearly shows that [she] had more Polish blood than any other". She was probably born between 3 October 1373 and 18 February 1374. (Note: Jadwiga's name was first recorded in instructions to Hungarian envoys to France on 17 April 1384. If by then, Jadwiga had reached twelve years, the minimum age prescribed by canon law for girls to marry, she must have been born before 18 February 1374.) She was named after her distant ancestor, Saint Hedwig of Silesia, who was especially venerated in the Hungarian royal court at the time of her birth.

King Louis I, who had not fathered any sons, wanted to ensure the right of his daughters to inherit his realms. Therefore, European royals regarded his three daughters as especially attractive brides. Leopold III, Duke of Austria, proposed his eldest son, William, to Jadwiga already on 18 August 1374. The envoys of the Polish nobles acknowledged that one of Louis's daughters would succeed him in Poland after he confirmed and extended their liberties in the Privilege of Koszyce on 17 September 1374. They took an oath of loyalty to Catherine on Louis I's demand.

Louis I agreed to give Jadwiga in marriage to William of Austria on 4 March 1375. The children's sponsalia de futuro, or "provisional marriage", was celebrated at Hainburg on 15 June 1378. The ceremony established the legal framework for the consummation of the marriage without any further ecclesiastical act as soon as they both reached the age of maturity. Duke William agreed that Jadwiga would only receive Treviso, a town that was to be conquered from the Republic of Venice, as dowry from her father. After the ceremony, Jadwiga stayed in Austria for almost two years; she mainly lived in Vienna.

Catherine died in late 1378. Louis I persuaded the most influential Polish lords to swear an oath of loyalty to her younger sister, Mary, in September 1379. She was betrothed to Sigismund of Luxemburg, a great-grandson of Casimir III the Great, who had been Louis I's predecessor on the Polish throne. The "promised marriage" of Jadwiga and William was confirmed at their fathers' meeting in Zólyom (now Zvolen in Slovakia) on 12 February 1380. Hungarian lords also approved the document, implying that Jadwiga and William were regarded as her father's successors in Hungary.

A delegation of the Polish lords and clergy paid formal homage to Sigismund of Luxembourg as their future king on 25 July 1382. The Poles believed that Louis also planned to persuade the Hungarian lords and prelates to accept Jadwiga and William of Austria as his heirs in Hungary. However, he died on 10 September 1382. Jadwiga was present at her father's death bed.

== Accession negotiations (1382–1384) ==
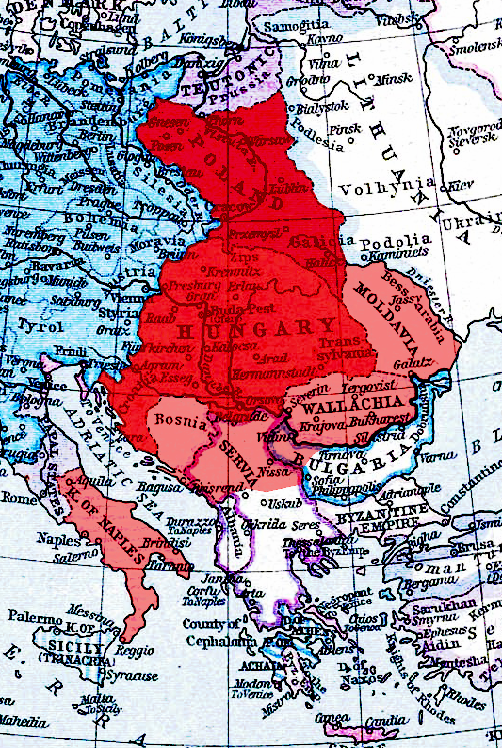
Lands ruled or claimed around 1370 by Jadwiga's father, Louis the Great (or the Hungarian): Hungary and Poland are colored red, the vassal states and the Kingdom of Naples are coloured light red

Jadwiga's sister, Mary, was crowned king of Hungary five days after their father's death. With the ceremony, their ambitious mother secured the right to govern Hungary on her twelve-year-old daughter's behalf instead of Mary's fiancé, Sigismund. Sigismund could not be present at Mary's coronation, because Louis I had sent him to Poland to crush a rebellion. After he learnt of Louis I's death, he adopted the title "Lord of the Kingdom of Poland", demanding oaths of loyalty from the towns in Lesser Poland. On 25 November, the nobles of Greater Poland assembled at Radomsko and decided to obey nobody but the daughter of the late king, as she would settle in Poland. On their initiative, the noblemen of Lesser Poland passed a similar agreement in Wiślica on 12 December. Queen Elizabeth sent her envoys to the assembled lords and forbade them to swear an oath of loyalty to anyone other than one of her daughters, thus invalidating the oath of loyalty that the Polish noblemen had sworn to Sigismund on the late King Louis's demand.

Both Elizabeth's daughters had been engaged to foreign princes (Sigismund and William, respectively) unpopular in Poland. Polish lords who were opposed to a foreign monarch regarded the members of the Piast dynasty as possible candidates to the Polish throne. Queen Elizabeth's uncle Władysław the White had already attempted to seize Poland during Louis's reign. However, he had taken monastic vows and settled in a Benedictine abbey in Dijon in Burgundy. Antipope Clement VII, whom King Louis I had refused to recognise against Pope Urban VI, released Władysław II from his vows, but he did not leave his monastery. Meanwhile, Siemowit IV, Duke of Masovia, appeared as a more ambitious candidate. He was especially popular among the nobility and townspeople of Greater Poland.

Queen Elizabeth's representatives released the Poles from their oath of fidelity that their representatives had sworn to Mary at an assembly in Sieradz in February 1383. The envoys also announced that she was willing to send Jadwiga to be crowned instead, on condition that she return to Buda after her coronation to live there until her twelfth birthday. The Polish lords accepted the proposal, but they soon realised that thereby the interregnum would be extended by a further three years. At a new meeting in Sieradz, most noblemen were ready to elect Siemowit of Masovia king on 28 March. They proposed that Siemowit should marry Jadwiga. A member of the influential Tęczyński family, Jan Tęczyński, convinced them to postpone Siemowit's election. The noblemen agreed to wait for Jadwiga until 10 May, stipulating that she was to live in Poland after her coronation. They also demanded that Dobrzyń and Gniewków (two fiefdoms which her father had granted to Vladislaus II of Opole), and "Ruthenia" (that had passed to Hungary in accordance with a previous treaty) be restored to the Polish Crown.

Meanwhile, Jan Tęczyński and his allies, including Sędziwój Pałuka, seem to have started negotiations with Jogaila, Grand Duke of Lithuania. Siemowit's supporters, however, tried to enter Kraków in the retinue of Bodzanta, Archbishop of Gniezno, in May, but the townspeople closed the gates of the city before their arrival. Jadwiga had not arrived in Poland by the stipulated date (10 May). Her mother's envoys stated that the spring floods had hindered Jadwiga's progress over the Carpathian Mountains.

Siemowit IV, Duke of Masovia took up arms and advanced as far as Kalisz. His supporters assembled in Sieradz in August in order to elect him king, but the Archbishop of Gniezno, Bodzanta, refused to perform his coronation. In a meeting in Kassa, Queen Elizabeth promised the delegates of the Polish provinces to send Jadwiga to Poland before November. The queen mother and the Poles also agreed that if either Jadwiga or Mary died childless, her kingdom would pass to her surviving sister. Siemowit IV, having laid siege to Kalisz, Queen Elizabeth sent Sigismund of Luxemburg at the head of an "improvised army" to Lesser Poland. Siemowit failed to take Kalisz, but news about the appalling behaviour of Sigismund's soldiers increased Sigismund's unpopularity in Poland. Sędziwój Pałuka, who was the castellan of Kalisz and starosta of Kraków, led a delegation to Zadar in Dalmatia to negotiate with Queen Elizabeth, but she had him imprisoned instead. She sent Hungarian soldiers to Poland to garrison them in Wawel Castle in Kraków, but Pałuka escaped and successfully obstructed her soldiers from entering the castle.

At a general assembly in Radomsko in early March, the delegates of all the Polish provinces and towns decided to elect Siemowit IV king if Jadwiga did not come to Poland within two months. They set up a provisional government, stipulating that only the "community of lords and citizens" had the authority to administer Poland during the interregnum. Queen Elizabeth, who was only informed of the decision by an informal message, realised that she could not any longer postpone Jadwiga's coronation and so sent her to Poland. The exact date of Jadwiga's arrival is unknown because the main source for the history of Poland during this period – Jan of Czarnków's chronicle – ended prior to this event.

== Reign ==
=== Coronation (1384) ===
The interregnum that followed Louis I's death and caused such internal strife came to an end with Jadwiga's arrival in Poland. A large crowd of clerics, noblemen and burghers gathered at Kraków "to greet her with a display of affection", according to the 15th century Polish historian, Jan Długosz. Nobody protested when Archbishop Bodzanta crowned her on 16 October 1384. According to traditional scholarly consensus, Jadwiga was crowned King. Robert W. Knoll proposes that the Polish lords wanted to prevent her eventual spouse from adopting the same title without their consent. Stephen C. Rowell suggests that sporadic contemporaneous references to Jadwiga as king only reflect that she was not a queen consort, but a queen regnant.

Bodzanta, Archbishop of Gniezno, Jan Radlica, Bishop of Kraków, Dobrogost of Nowy Dwór, Bishop of Poznań, and Duke Vladislaus II of Opole were Jadwiga's most trusted advisers during the first years of her reign. According to a widely accepted scholarly theory, Jadwiga, who was still a minor, was "a mere tool" to her advisers. However, Halecki refutes this view, contending that Jadwiga matured quickly and her personality, especially her charm and kindness, only served to strengthen her position. Already in late 1384, she intervened on Duke Vladislaus's behalf to reconcile him with her mother's favourite, Nicholas I Garai.

=== Refusal of William (1385) ===
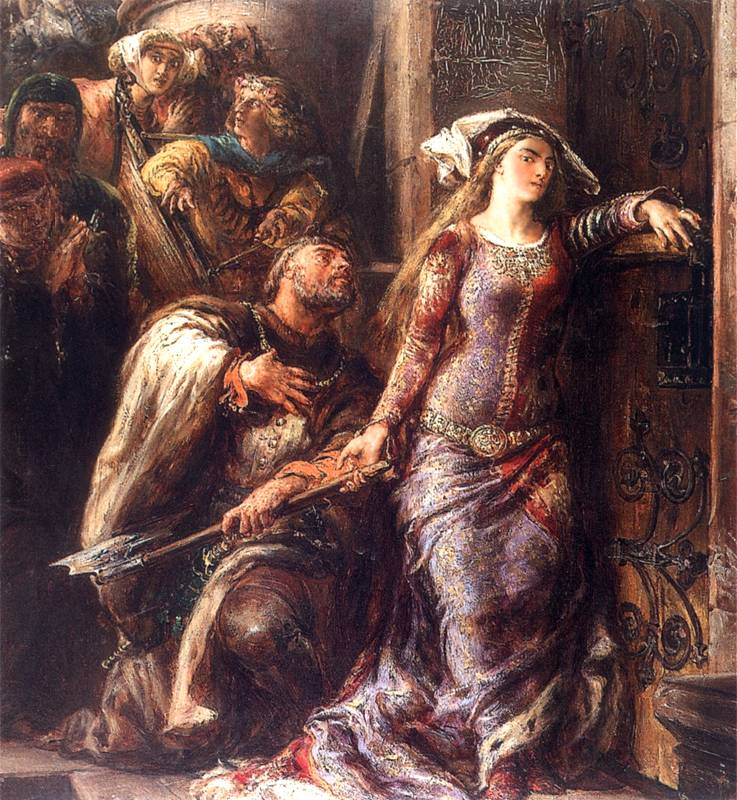
Dymitr of Goraj by Jan Matejko depicts Jadwiga trying to break the castle gate to join William.

The Polish lords did not want to accept fourteen-year-old William of Habsburg as Jadwiga's husband and Polish sovereign. They thought that the inexperienced William and his Austrian kinsmen could not safeguard Poland's interests against its powerful neighbours, especially the House of Luxembourg which controlled Bohemia and Brandenburg, and had a strong claim on Hungary. According to Halecki, the lords of Lesser Poland were the first to suggest that Jadwiga should marry the pagan duke Władysław II Jagiełło of Lithuania.

Władysław II Jagiełło sent his envoys – including his brother, Skirgaila, and a German burgher from Riga, Hanul – to Kraków to request Jadwiga's hand in January 1385. Jadwiga refused to answer, stating only that her mother would decide. Jogaila's two envoys left for Hungary and met Queen Elizabeth. She informed them that "she would allow whatever was advantageous to Poland and insisted that her daughter and the prelates and nobles of the Kingdom had to do what they considered would benefit Christianity and their kingdom", according to Jan Długosz's chronicle. The nobles from Kraków, Sandomierz and Greater Poland assembled in Kraków in June or July and the "majority of the more sensible" voted for the acceptance of Jogaila's marriage proposal.

In the meantime, William's father, Leopold III, hurried to Buda in late July 1385, demanding the consummation of the marriage between William and Jadwiga before 16 August. Queen Elizabeth confirmed the previous agreements about the marriage, ordering Vladislaus II of Opole to make preparations for the ceremony. According to canon law, Jadwiga's marriage sacrament could only be completed before her twelfth birthday if the competent prelate testified her precocious maturity. Demetrius, Archbishop of Esztergom, issued the necessary document. William went to Kraków in the first half of August, but his entry to Wawel Castle was barred. Długosz states that Jadwiga and William would only be able to meet in the nearby Franciscan convent.

Contemporary or nearly contemporaneous records of the completion of the marriage between William and Jadwiga are contradictory and unclear. The official accounts of the municipal authorities of Kraków record that on 23 August 1385, an amnesty was granted to the prisoners in the city jail on the occasion of the celebration of the Queen's marriage. On the other hand, a contemporary Austrian chronicle, the Continuatio Claustroneubuzgis states that the Poles had tried to murder William before he consummated the marriage. In the next century, Długosz states that William was "removed in a shameful and offensive manner and driven from the castle" after he entered "the Queen's bedchamber"; but the same chronicler also mentions that Jadwiga was well aware that "many people knew that ... she had for a fortnight shared her bed with Duke William and that there had been physical consummation". Długosz also mentions that Jadwiga later in her life publicly claimed to have never consummated her union with William.

During the night that William entered the queen's bedchamber, a group of Polish noblemen broke into the castle, forcing William to flee, according to Długosz. After this humiliation, Długosz continued, Jadwiga decided to leave Wawel and join William, but the gate of the castle was locked. She called for "an axe and [tried] to break it open", but Dymitr of Goraj convinced her to return to the castle. Oscar Halecki says that Długosz's narrative "cannot be dismissed as a romantic legend"; Robert I. Frost writes that it is a "tale, almost certainly apocryphal". There is no doubt, however, that William of Austria was forced to leave Poland.

=== Marriage to Władysław II Jagiełło (1385–1392) ===
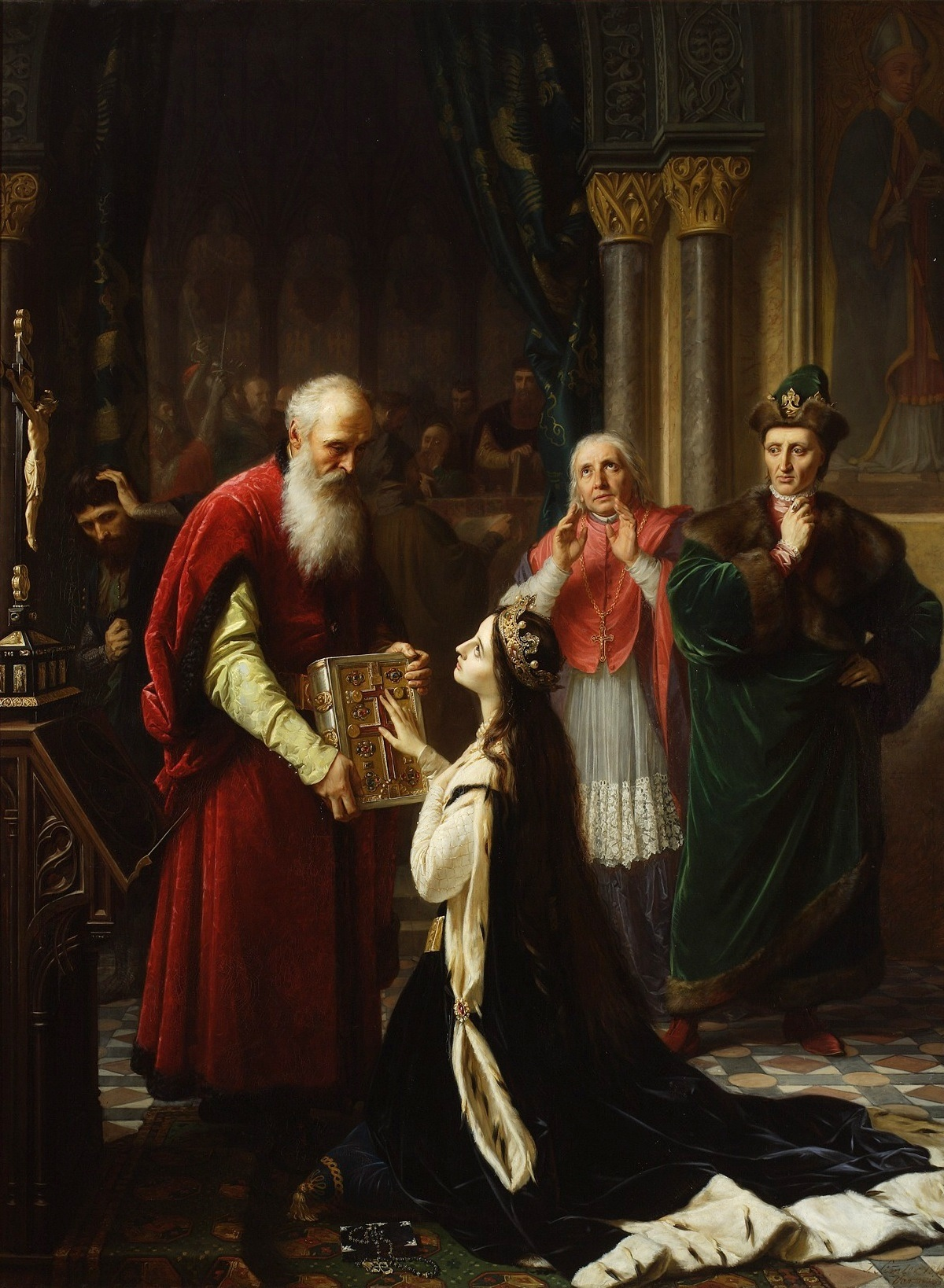
Queen Jadwiga's Oath, by Józef Simmler, 1867

Władysław II Jagiełło signed the Union of Krewo in August 1385, promising Queen Elizabeth's representatives and the Polish lords' envoys that he would convert to Catholicism, together with his pagan kinsmen and subjects, if Jadwiga married him. He also pledged to pay 200,000 florins to William of Habsburg in compensation. William never accepted it. Two days after the Union of Krewo, the Teutonic Knights invaded Lithuania.

The Aeltere Hochmeisterchronik and other chronicles written in the Knights' territory accused the Polish prelates and lords of forcing Jadwiga to accept Władysław II Jagiełło's offer. According to a Polish legend, Jadwiga agreed to marry Władysław II Jagiełło due to divine inspiration during her long prayers before a crucifix in Wawel Cathedral. Siemowit IV of Mazovia resigned his claim to Poland in December.

The Polish lords' envoys informed Władysław II that they would obey him if he married Jadwiga on 11 January 1386. Władysław II went to Lublin where a general assembly unanimously declared him "King and Lord of Poland" on 2 February. Władysław II went on to Kraków, where he was baptised, receiving the Christian name, Władysław, in Wawel Cathedral on 15 February. Soon after according to Cracow's Cathedral Calendar Jadwiga declared her union with William to be null and void: "[...] though Jadwiga had been, as people believed, wed by her parents in her childhood years to William, Duke of Austria, now, when she came of age, she publicly declared those nuptials, if there had been any, null, and renounced them".

On 18 February 1386, Władysław II, who was between 22 and 35 years old, married 12-year-old Jadwiga. Władysław II styled himself as dominus et tutor regni Poloniae ("lord and guardian of the Kingdom of Poland") in his first charter issued after the marriage. Archbishop Bodzanta crowned him the King on 4 March 1386.

Jadwiga and her husband ruled as co-regents. The pair initially did not speak a common language, but Władysław eventually learnt Polish and they cooperated closely in their marriage. Jadwiga accompanied him to Greater Poland to appease the local lords who were still hostile to him. The royal visit caused damage to the peasants who lived in the local prelates' domains, but the Queen persuaded her husband to compensate them, saying: "We have, indeed, returned the peasants' cattle, but who can repair their tears?", according to Długosz's chronicle. A court record of her order to the judges in favour of a peasant also shows that she protected the poor.

Pope Urban VI sent his legate, Maffiolus de Lampugnano, to Kraków to enquire about the marriage of the royal couple. Lampugnano did not voice any objections, but the Teutonic Knights started a propaganda campaign in favour of William of Habsburg. Queen Elizabeth pledged to assist Władysław II against his enemies on 9 June 1386, but Hungary had sunken into anarchy. A group of Slavonian lords captured and imprisoned Jadwiga's mother and sister on 25 July. The rebels murdered Queen Elizabeth in January 1387. A month later, Jadwiga marched at the head of Polish troops to Ruthenia, where all but one of the governors submitted to her without opposition.

Duke Vladislaus of Opole also had a claim on Ruthenia but could not convince King Wenceslaus of Germany to intervene on his behalf. Jadwiga confirmed the privileges of the local inhabitants and promised that Ruthenia would never again be separated from the Polish Crown. After the reinforcements that Władysław II sent from Lithuania arrived in August, Halych, the only fortress to resist, also surrendered. Władysław II also came to Ruthenia in September. Voivode Peter II of Moldavia visited the royal couple and paid homage to them in Lviv on 26 September. Władysław II confirmed the privileges that Jadwiga had granted the Ruthenians in October. She also instructed her subjects to show the same respect for her husband as for herself: in a letter addressed to the burghers of Kraków in late 1387, she stated that her husband was their "natural lord".

On William's demand, Pope Urban VI initiated a new investigation into the marriage of Jadwiga and Władysław II. They sent Bishop Dobrogost of Poznań to Rome to inform the pope of the Christianization of Lithuania. In his letter to Bishop Dobrogost, Pope Urban jointly mentioned the royal couple in March 1388, which implied that he had already acknowledged the legality of their marriage. However, Gniewosz of Dalewice, who had been William of Habsburg's supporter, spread rumours about secret meetings between William and Jadwiga in the royal castle. Jadwiga took a solemn oath before Jan Tęczyński, stating that she had only had marital relations with Władysław II. After all witnesses confirmed her oath, Gniewosz of Dalewice confessed that he had lied. She did not take vengeance on him.

=== Strife with Sigismund (1392–1395) ===
Stephen I of Moldavia's promise of loyalty to Jadwiga and Władysław II against Sigismund

Jadwiga's brother-in-law, Sigismund, who had been crowned King of Hungary, started negotiations with the Teutonic Knights about partitioning Poland in early 1392. Jadwiga met Mary in Stará Ľubovňa in May and returned to Kraków only in early July. She most probably accompanied her husband to Lithuania, according to Oscar Halecki, because she was far from Kraków till the end of August. On 4 August, Władysław II's cousin, Vytautas, who had earlier fled from Lithuania to the Teutonic Knights, paid homage to Władysław II near Lida in Lithuania on 4 August.

Negotiations between Sigismund and the Grand Master of the Teutonic Knights, Konrad von Wallenrode, continued with the mediation of Vladislaus II of Opole. However, Hungary's southern border was exposed to Ottoman incursions, preventing Sigismund from taking military measures against Poland. Konrad von Wallenrode died on 25 July 1393. His successor, Konrad von Jungingen, opened negotiations with the Poles. During the discussions, Pope Boniface IX's legate, John of Messina, supported the Poles.

Jadwiga was a skilful mediator, famed for her impartiality and intelligence. She went to Lithuania to reconcile her brother-in-law, Skirgaila, with Vytautas in October 1393. Relations between Poland and Hungary remained tense. Sigismund invaded Moldavia, forcing Stephen I of Moldavia to accept his suzerainty in 1394. Soon after the Hungarian troops left Moldavia, Stephen sent his envoys to Jadwiga and Władysław II, promising to assist Poland against Hungary, the Ottoman Empire and the Teutonic Knights.

On 17 May 1395, Mary died after a riding accident. According to the 1383 agreement between their mother and the Polish lords, Jadwiga was her childless sister's heir in Hungary. Vlad I of Wallachia, a Hungarian vassal, issued an act of submission on 28 May, acknowledging Jadwiga and her husband as Mary's legitimate successors. The widowed king's close supporter, Stibor of Stiboricz, expelled Vlad I from Wallachia. Władysław II gathered his troops on the Polish-Hungarian border, but Eustache Jolsvai, Palatine of Hungary, and John Kanizsai, Archbishop of Esztergom, stopped his invasion of Hungary. In September, Konrad von Jungingen told the prince-electors of the Holy Roman Empire that the union of Poland, Lithuania, and Hungary under Władysław-Jogaila's rule would endanger Christendom. However, most of Sigismund's opponents, who were especially numerous in Croatia, supported the claim of Ladislaus of Naples, the last male member of the Capetian House of Anjou. On 8 September, the most influential Hungarian lords declared that they would not support any change in government while Sigismund was far from Hungary fighting against the Ottoman Turks. Before the end of the year, peace negotiations between the representatives of Hungary and Poland ended with an agreement. Jadwiga adopted the title "heir to Hungary", but she and her husband took no further action against Sigismund.

=== Conflict with the Teutonic Knights (1395–1399) ===
The relationship between Lithuania and the Teutonic Knights remained tense. Jadwiga and her Polish advisers invited the Grand Master, Konrad von Jungingen, to Poland to open new negotiations in June 1396. Conflicts with Vladislaus II of Opole and Siemowit IV of Masovia, who had not given up their claims to parts of Ruthenia and Cuyavia, also intensified. To demonstrate that the territories were under Jadwiga's direct control, Władysław II granted the Duchy of Belz (in Ruthenia) and Cuyavia to her in early 1397. However, Jadwiga and her Polish advisers wanted to avoid a war with the Teutonic Order. In response, Władysław II replaced most Polish "starostas" (aldermen) in Ruthenia with local Orthodox noblemen. According to German sources, Władysław II and Vytautas jointly asked Pope Boniface IX to sanction Vytautas' coronation as king of Lithuania and Ruthenia.

Jadwiga and Jungingen met in Włocławek in the middle of June, but they did not reach a compromise. The Teutonic Order entrusted Vladislaus of Opole with the task of representing their claims to Dobrzyń against Jadwiga. Jadwiga and her husband met Sigismund of Hungary, who had returned there after his catastrophic defeat in the Battle of Nicopolis, on 14 July. They seem to have reached a compromise because Sigismund offered to mediate between Poland, Lithuania and the Teutonic Knights. On Jadwiga's request, Wenceslaus of Bohemia granted permission for the establishment of a college for Lithuanian students in Prague on 20 July 1397. Jadwiga, who had spent "many sleepless nights" thinking of this project, according to herself, issued a charter of establishment for the college on 10 November.

She opened new negotiations with the Teutonic Knights, but Konrad von Jungingen dispatched a simple knight to meet her in May 1398. Władysław II's cousin Vytautas, also entered into negotiations with the Teutonic Knights because he wanted to unite Lithuania and Ruthenia under his rule and to receive a royal crown from the Holy See. According to the chronicle of John of Posilge, who was an official of the Teutonic Order, Jadwiga sent a letter to Vytautas, reminding him to pay the annual tribute that Władysław-Jogaila had granted her as dower. Offended by Jadwiga's demand, Vytautas sought the opinion of the Lithuanian and Ruthenian lords, who refused Jadwiga's claim to a tribute. On 12 October 1398, he signed a peace treaty with the Teutonic Knights, without referring to Władysław II's right to confirm it. Oscar Halecki says that Posilge's "sensational story" is either an invention based on gossip or a guess by the chronicler.

=== Pregnancy and death (1399) ===
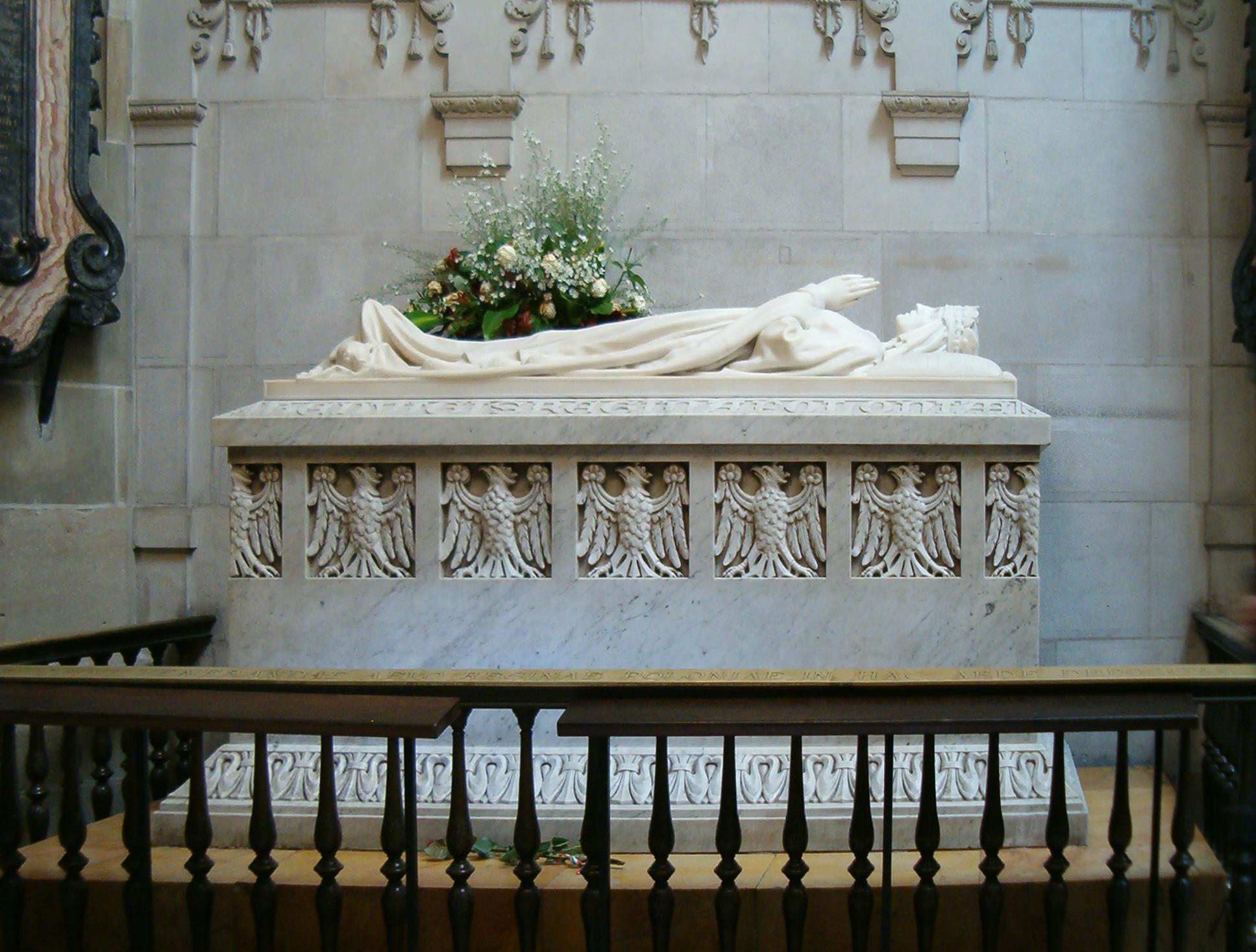
Jadwiga's sarcophagus, Wawel Cathedral, Kraków

Jadwiga was childless for over a decade, which, according to chronicles written in the Teutonic lands, caused conflicts between her and her husband. She became pregnant in September 1398. Vytautas, in order to bolster his authority over the Russian principalities, decided to launch an expedition against the Golden Horde with his new Tatar allies, including Tokhtamysh, who been deposed by Timur. According to Jan Długosz's chronicle, Jadwiga warned the Polish noblemen not to join Vytautas' campaign because it would end in failure. Halecki says that the great number of Polish knights who joined Vytautas's expedition proves that Długosz's report is not reliable.

On the occasion of the expected birth to the royal couple, Vytautas sent expensive gifts, including a silver cradle, to the royal court on behalf of himself and his wife, Anna. The first horoscopes written for Jadwiga's and Władysław II's child in mid-September 1398 predicted a son. However, a girl was delivered on 22 June 1399 at Wawel Castle. Reports of the time stated that the child was born prematurely. According to the horoscope, she was actually born slightly late. (Note: The astrologer said the Queen would deliver on 18 June, but she delivered on 22 June; Śnieżyńska-Stolot, pp. 5–32)

The newborn princess was named Elizabeth Bonifacia (Polish: Elżbieta Bonifacja, Lithuanian: Elżbieta Bonifacija), after Jadwiga's mother and Pope Boniface IX, who, in a letter of 5 May 1399, had agreed to be godfather under the condition that the infant be named after him. She was baptised by Piotr Wysz Radoliński, Bishop of Kraków. However, the infant died after only three weeks, on 13 July 1399. Jadwiga, too, was on her deathbed. Stanisław of Skarbimierz expressed hope that she would survive, describing her as the spiritual mother of the poor, weak, and ill of Poland. She advised her husband to marry Anna of Cilli, Casimir the Great's granddaughter – which he did – and died on 17 July 1399, four days after her newborn daughter. She was the last hereditary ruler of Poland; her husband and his descendants retained the crown as elective monarchs.

==== Burial ====
Jadwiga and her daughter were buried together in Wawel Cathedral, on 24 August 1399, as stipulated in the Queen's last will. On 12 July 1949, 550 years later, their tomb was opened; as the Princess's remains were not found, it was back then incorrectly believed that nothing remained of the child's soft cartilage. However, new research suggests that Elizabeth's body had been exhumated in 17th century and buried separately in a bowl which was placed under Jadwiga's coffin. The bowl was subsequently destroyed and eventually glued back together after being found by archeologists; if the Princess was indeed reburied within it, her remains were not located there during rediscovery of the item in the modern times.

== Family ==
Ancestors of Jadwiga of Poland

16. Charles II of Naples
8. Charles Martel of Anjou
17. Mary of Hungary
4. Charles I of Hungary
18. Rudolf I of Germany
9. Klementia of Habsburg
19. Gertrude of Hohenberg
2. Louis I of Hungary
20. Casimir I of Kuyavia
10. Władysław I of Poland
21. Euphrosyne of Opole
5. Elisabeth of Poland
22. Boleslaw of Kalisz and Gniezno
11. Jadwiga of Kalisz
23. Jolanta of Hungary
1. Jadwiga of Poland
24. Prijezda I of Bosnia
12. Stephen I of Bosnia
6. Stephen II of Bosnia
26. Stephen Dragutin of Serbia
13. Elizabeth of Serbia
27. Catherine of Hungary
3. Elizabeth of Bosnia
28. Ziemomysł of Kuyavia
14. Kazimierz III of Gniewkowo
29. Salome of Pomerania
7. Elizabeth of Kuyavia

The following family tree illustrates Jadwiga's connection to her notable relatives. Kings of Poland are coloured blue.

Konrad I of Masovia
Casimir I of Kuyavia | Siemowit I of Masovia
Władysław the Elbow-high (r. 1320–1333) | Ziemomysł of Kuyavia | Bolesław II of Masovia
Casimir the Great (r. 1333–1370) | Elizabeth of Poland | Casimir II of Kuyavia | Trojden I of Masovia
Elizabeth of Poland | Elizabeth of Kuyavia | Władysław the White | Anna of Poland | Siemowit III of Masovia
Elizabeth of Pomerania | Louis the Great (r. 1370–1382) | Elizabeth of Bosnia | Siemowit IV of Masovia
Sigismund of Luxemburg | Mary of Hungary | Jadwiga (r. 1384–1399) | Władysław-Jogaila (r. 1386–1434) | Anna of Cilli

== Legacy ==
=== Achievements ===
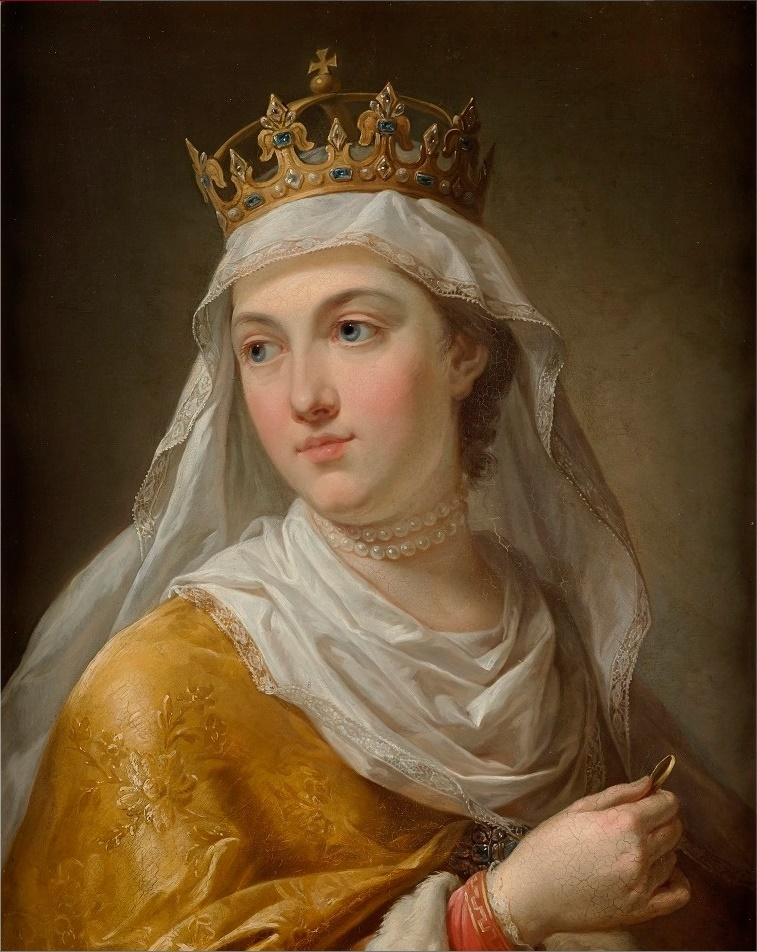
Jadwiga painting by Marcello Bacciarelli

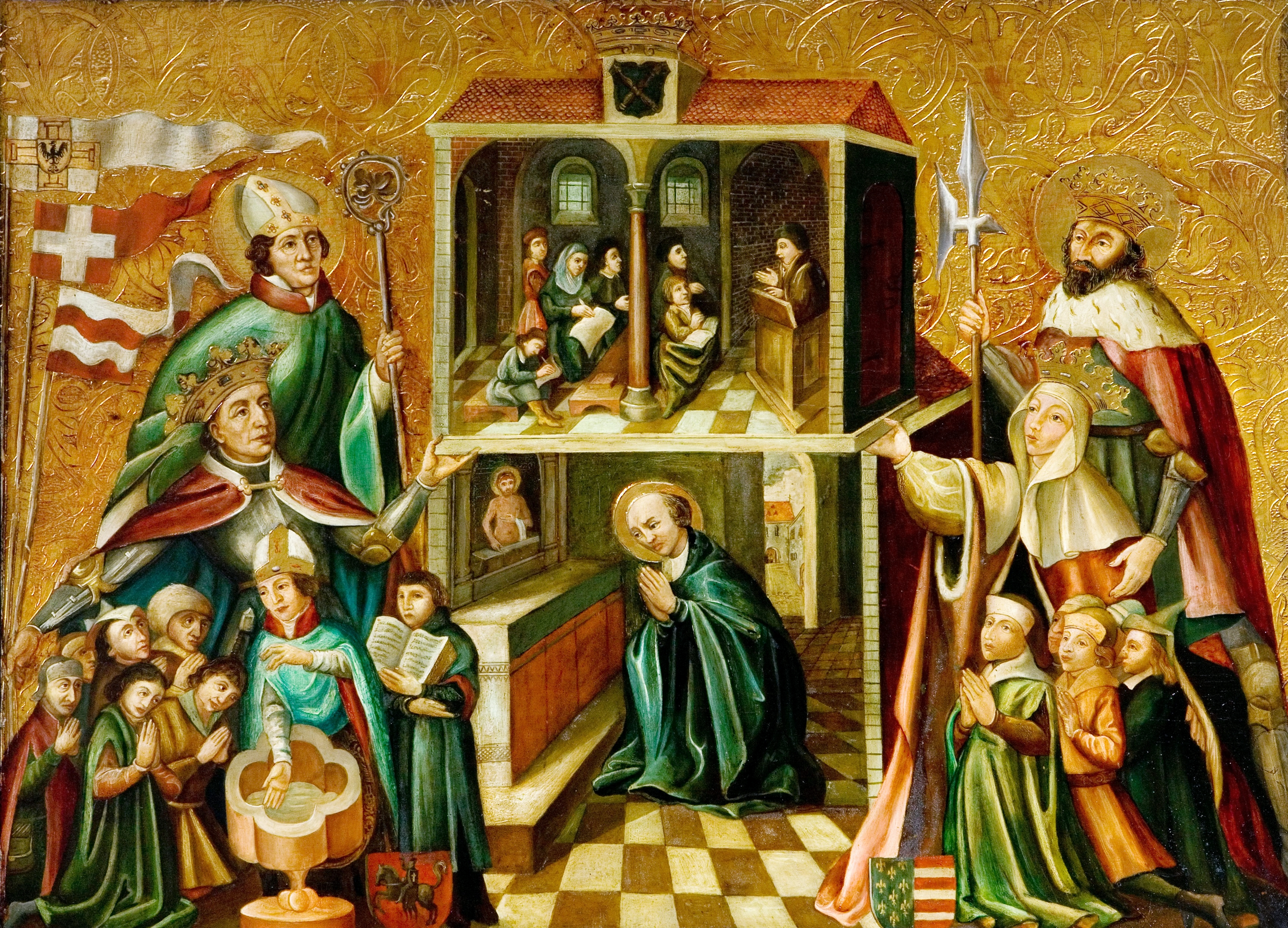
Jadwiga depicted with her husband as the founders of the Jagiellonian University, early 16th century

Two leading historians, Oscar Halecki and S. Harrison Thomson, agree that Jadwiga was one of the greatest rulers of Poland, comparable to Bolesław the Brave and Casimir the Great. Her marriage to Władysław II enabled the union of Poland and Lithuania, establishing a large state in East Central Europe. Jadwiga's decision to marry the "elderly" Władysław II instead of her beloved fiancé, William of Habsburg, has often been described as a sacrifice for her country in Polish historiography. Her biographers emphasise Jadwiga's efforts to preserve the peace with the Teutonic Order, which enabled Poland to make preparations for a decisive war against the Knights. Jadwiga's death without surviving children weakened Władysław II's position because his claim to Poland was based on their marriage. Six days after her funeral, Władysław-Jogaila left Poland for Ruthenia, stating that he was to return to Lithuania after his wife's death. The Polish lords sent their envoys to Lviv to open negotiations with him. The delegates took new oaths of loyalty to him, confirming his position as king. On the lords' demand, he agreed to marry Anna of Cilli. Their wedding was celebrated on 29 January 1402.

Jadwiga's cultural and charitable activities were of exceptional value. She established new hospitals, schools and churches, and restored older ones. Jadwiga promoted the use of vernacular in church services, especially the singing of hymns in Polish. The Scriptures were translated into Polish on her order.

Casimir the Great had already in 1364 established the University of Kraków, but it did not survive his death. Władysław II and Jadwiga jointly asked Pope Boniface IX to sanction the establishment of a faculty of theology in Kraków. The pope granted their request on 11 January 1397. Jadwiga bought houses along a central street of Kraków for the university. However, the faculty was only set up a year after Jadwiga's death: Władysław II issued the charter for the reestablished university on 26 July 1400. In accordance with Jadwiga's last will, the restoration of the university was partially financed through the sale of her jewellery.

=== Holiness ===
Saint Jadwiga of Poland
- Venerated in: Catholic Church
- Beatified: 8 August 1986, Kraków, Poland by Pope John Paul II
- Canonized: 8 June 1997, Kraków, Poland by Pope John Paul II
- Major shrine: Wawel Cathedral, Kraków, Poland
- Feast: 17 July
- Attributes: Royal dress and shoes, apron full of roses
- Patronage: Poland, queens, united Europe, students, mothers

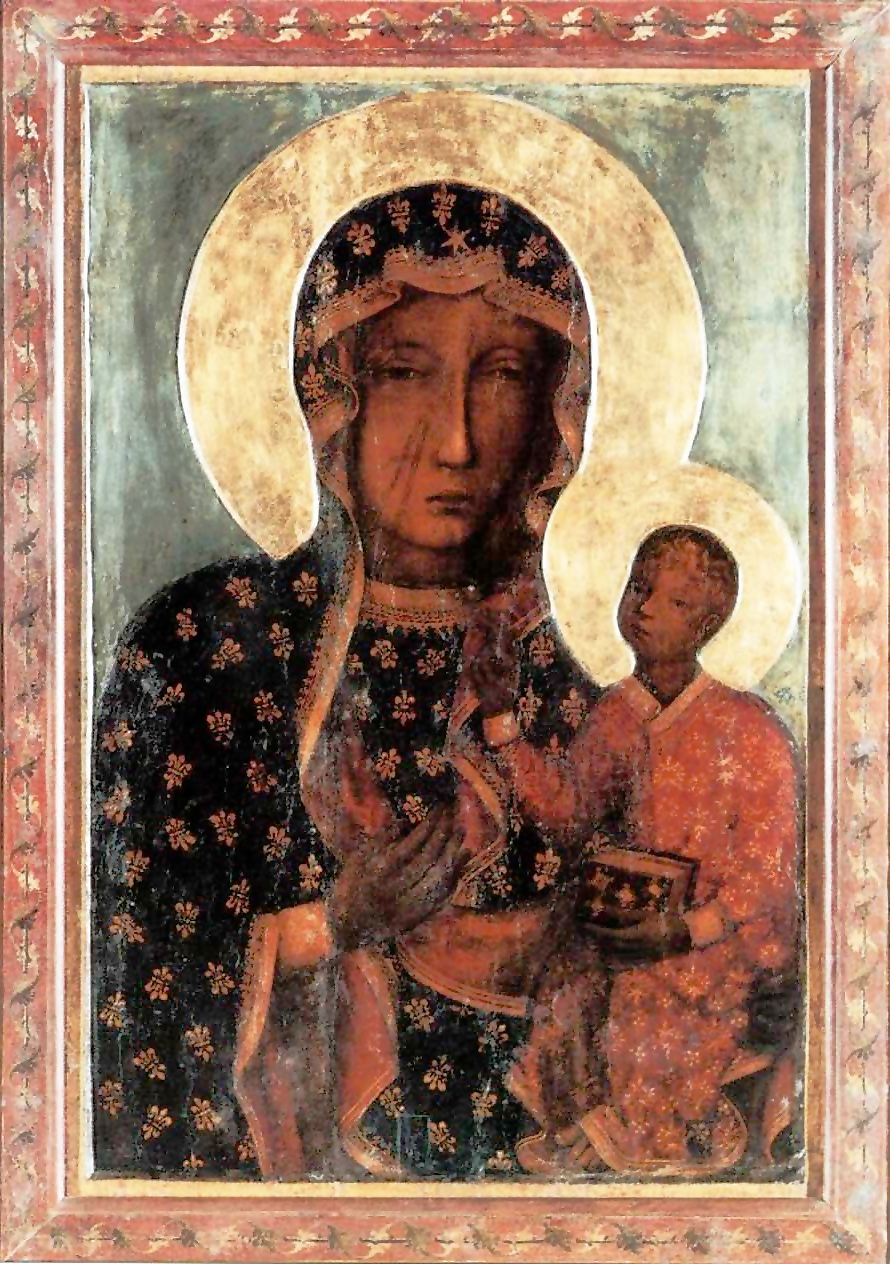
Icon of Black Madonna of Częstochowa, damaged and renovated in 1430s. It has been proposed to be a posthumous image of Jadwiga based on hers now-lost contemporary portraiture. Fleur-de-lis on Madonna's robes might have served as a symbol of Anjou dynasty.

Oscar Halecki writes that Jadwiga transmitted to the nations of East Central Europe the "universal heritage of the respublica Christiana, which in the West was then waning, but in East Central Europe started flourishing and blending with the pre-Renaissance world". She was closely related to the saintly 13th century princesses, venerated in Hungary and Poland, including Elizabeth of Hungary and her nieces, Kinga and Yolanda, and Salomea of Poland. She was born to a family famed for its religious zeal. She attended Mass every day. Following her family's tradition, Jadwiga was especially devoted to the Blessed Virgin Mary. An inscription engraved on her request on a precious chalice, which was placed in the Wawel Cathedral, asked Our Lady to place Poland under her protection.

Jadwiga was venerated in Poland soon after her death. Stanisław of Skarbimierz states that she had been "the most Christian queen" in his sermon composed for her funeral. Paul of Zator referred to the wax figures placed by her grave. Sermons written in the early 15th century emphasised that Jadwiga had been a representative of the traditional virtues of holy women, such as mercy and benevolence. Around the same time, the preeliminary canonization process started, and it is speculated by Zygmunt Holcer that in 1430s a face of Virgin Mary on severely damaged Black Madonna of Częstochowa was re-painted with features of Jadwiga, based on now lost portrait(s) of the Queen, with the purpose of serving as her beatification image.

Numerous legends about miracles were recounted to justify her sainthood. The two best-known are those of "the Black Crucifix" and "Jadwiga's foot":

Jadwiga often prayed before a large black crucifix hanging in the north aisle of Wawel Cathedral. During one of these prayers, the Christ on the cross is said to have spoken to her. The crucifix, "the Black Crucifix", is still there, with her relics beneath it. According to another legend, Jadwiga took a piece of jewellery from her foot and gave it to a poor stonemason who had begged for her help. When the queen left, he noticed her footprint in the plaster floor of his workplace, even though the plaster had already hardened before her visit. The supposed footprint, known as "Jadwiga's foot", can still be seen in one of Kraków's churches.

In yet another legend, Jadwiga was taking part in a Corpus Christi Day procession when a coppersmith's son drowned by falling into a river. Jadwiga threw her mantle over the boy's body, and he regained life.

On 8 June 1979, Pope John Paul II prayed at her sarcophagus, and the Congregation for Divine Worship and the Discipline of the Sacraments officially affirmed her beatification on 8 August 1986. The Pope went on to canonise Jadwiga in Kraków on 8 June 1997.

== In literature ==
In Ethel Irving's 1872 verse drama, Hedvige, Jadwiga is torn between her love for William of Austria and the prospect of freeing Christian prisoners in Lithuania, which will only be made a reality if she marries Władysław II Jagiełło.

Hedvigis. Dziedziczka królestwa (2021), a Polish historical novel about the early life and reign of Jadwiga by Krzysztof Konopka, follows the story of Jadwiga, her sister Mary, and their mother.

== In popular culture ==
Jadwiga is the main character of the third season of Polish historical TV series Korona królów (The Crown of the Kings). She is played by Dagmara Bryzek. Child Jadwiga is played by Natalia Wolska and Amelia Zawadzka.

Jadwiga appears as the leader of the Polish civilisation in the turn-based strategy game Civilization VI, specialising in religion and territorial expansion. She also features in Age of Empires II: Definitive Edition - Dawn of the Dukes in a campaign of her own.

== See also ==
- History of Poland during the Piast dynasty
- History of Poland during the Jagiellonian dynasty
- Saint Hedwig of Poland, patron saint archive

== Bibliography ==
=== Primary sources ===
- Długosz, Jan (1997). The annals of Jan Długosz. Translated by Michael, Maurice. Chichester: IM Publications. ISBN 978-1-901019-00-1.

=== Secondary sources ===
- Baczkowski, Krzysztof (1999). Wielka historia Polski. Tome 3: Dzieje Polski późnośredniowiecznej (1370 - 1506) (in Polish). Fogra Oficyna Wydawnicza. ISBN 83-7311-075-5.
- Besala, Jerzy (2006). Małżeństwa królewskie. Jagiellonowie (in Polish). Bellona Muza. ISBN 8311105553.
- Besala, Jerzy (2006a). Małżeństwa królewskie. Piastowie, Przemyślidzi, Andegawenowie' (in Polish). Bellona Muza. ISBN 83-11-10553-7.
- Brzezińska, Anna (1999). "Jadwiga of Anjou as the Image of a Good Queen in Late Medieval and Early Modern Poland". The Polish Review. XLIV (4). The Polish Institute of Arts and Sciences of America: 407–437.
- Borkowska, Urszula (2012). Dynastia Jagiellonów w Polsce. PWN. ISBN 9788301205331.
- Davies, Norman (2005). God's Playground: A History of Poland, Volume I: The Origins to 1795 (Revised Edition). Columbia University Press. ISBN 978-0-231-12817-9.
- Deletant, Dennis (1986). "Moldavia between Hungary and Poland, 1347–1412". The Slavonic and East European Review. 64 (2): 189–211.
- Duczmal, Małgorzata (1996). Jagiellonowie. Kraków: Wydawnictwo Literackie. ISBN 83-08-02577-3.
- Engel, Pál (2001). The Realm of St Stephen: A History of Medieval Hungary, 895–1526. I.B. Tauris. ISBN 1-86064-061-3.
- Frost, Robert I. (2015). The Oxford History of Poland-Lithuania, Volume I: The Making of the Polish-Lithuanian Union, 1385–1567. Oxford University Press. ISBN 978-0-19-820869-3.
- Gromada, Thaddeus V. (1999). "Oscar Halecki's Vision of Saint Jadwiga of Anjou". The Polish Review. XLIV (4). The Polish Institute of Arts and Sciences of America: 433–437.
- Halecki, Oscar (1991). Jadwiga of Anjou and the Rise of East Central Europe. Polish Institute of Arts and Sciences of America. ISBN 0-88033-206-9.
- Jackson, Guida M. (1999). Women Rulers Throughout the Ages: An Illustrated Guide. ABC-Clio. ISBN 1-57607-091-3.
- Jasienica, Paweł (1988). Polska Jagiellonów [Jagellonian Poland] (in Polish). Państwowy Instytut Wydawniczy. ISBN 83-06-01796-X.
- Knoll, Paul W. (2011). "Religious Toleration in Sixteenth-Century Poland: Political Realities and Social Constraints". In Louthan, Howard; Cohen, Gary B.; Szabo, Franz A. J. (eds.). Diversity and Dissent: Negotiating Religious Difference in Central Europe, 1500–1800. Berghahn Books. pp. 30–52. ISBN 978-0-85745-108-8.
- Morys-Twarowski, Michael (2026). Jagiełło Rex. Początek dynastii (in Polish). Znak Horyzont. ISBN 978-83-8427-537-5.
- Nikodem, arosław (2009). Jadwiga, król Polski (in Polish). Ossolineum. ISBN 978-83-04-04978-9.
- Monter, William (2012). The Rise of Female Kings in Europe, 1300–1800. Yale University Press. ISBN 978-0-300-17327-7.
- Przybyszewski, Bolesław (1975). "Jadwiga i Wilhelm". Analecta Cracoviensia (in Polish). VII.
- Sedlar, Jean W. (1994). East Central Europe in the Middle Ages, 1000–1500. University of Washington Press. ISBN 0-295-97290-4.
- Sroka, Stanisław Andrzej (1999). Genealogia Andegawenów węgierskich [Genealogy of the Hungarian Angevins] (in Polish). Towarzystwo Naukowe Societas Vistulana. ISBN 83-909094-1-3.
- Sroka, Stanisław (2025). "Kiedy urodziła się królowa Jadwiga?". Folia Historica Cracoviensis.
- Rożek, Michał (2015). Groby królewskie na Wawelu (in Polish) (4th ed.). Petrus. ISBN 978-83-7720-257-9.
- Wdowiszewski, Zygmunt (2005). Genealogia Jagiellonów i Domu Wazów w Polsce [Genealogy of the Jagiellonians and the House of Vases in Poland] (in Polish). Kraków: Avalon.
- Wolf, Armin (1993). "Reigning Queens in Medieval Europe: When, Where, and Why". In Parsons, John Carmi (ed.). Medieval Queenship. Sutton Publishing. pp. 169–188. ISBN 0-7509-1831-4.

Jadwiga of Poland Capetian House of Anjou Cadet branch of the Capetian dynasty Born: 1373/1374 Died: 17 July 1399
Regnal titles
| Vacant Title last held by Louis I of Hungary | Queen of Poland; 1384–1399 with Władysław II Jagiełło (1386–1399) | Succeeded by Władysław II Jagiełło |
| Preceded by Birutė | Grand Duchess consort of Lithuania; 1386–1399 | Succeeded by Anna Vytautienė |
