= Stanisław Osada =

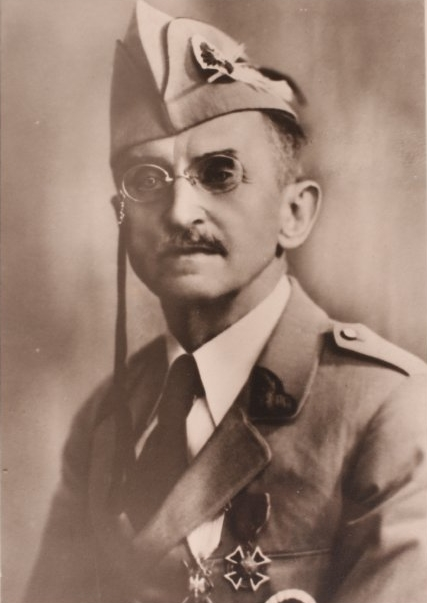

Stanisław Osada (April 14, 1869 - July 28, 1934) was a Polonia activist, Polish nationalist, and author. His writings are credited with raising the national consciousness of Polish immigrants in the United States.

He was born in Pruchnik and from a young age was active in the Polish insurrectionist circles in Galicia. Under a ceremonial oath to the group, he swore, "to dedicate [my] entire life and to be prepared at any time to shed one's blood for the freedom of the Fatherland." was fervidly patriotic and when he was conscripted into the Austrian Army, he organized fellow Poles to undermine their Austrian command. One of his actions among the soldiers was the organization of patriotic activities commemorating May 3rd Constitution Day. In 1891 he deserted the Army and left for Switzerland with his later wife, joining The Polish Society in Geneva, Switzerland. The group sent him to the United States in pursuit of a union with the Polish diaspora. He left for America in 1893 to organize Poles for the cause of national autonomy, national unity, and Polish heritage.

He moved to Chicago where he was active in several Polish-American organizations, including the Polish National Alliance, the Polish Falcons of America, the Polish National Council, and the National Defense Committee. During World War I, he was secretary of the Polish Central Relief Committee and spearheaded an effort to compile demographic statistics on Polish Americans. His census statistics depended heavily on Polish parish documents, which he gained from 1915 to 1918. He was a prolific journalist, contributing articles to many Polish language newspapers: Reformer, Kuryer Polski, Dziennik Milwaucki, Wiadomosci Codzienne, and served as editor of the Tygodnik Milwauki and Sztandar.

In 1919, following Herman Bernstein's open letter blaming Poles for organizing pogroms against the Jews, Osada published a translation of Bernstein's letter in many Polish American publications, accused him of stirring an anti-Polish campaign. Osada concluded his article with a threat of boycotting Jewish merchants in the United States.

After World War I, when Poland achieved independence, he used his networks to support a $100 million fundraiser in support of Poland during its fight with the Bolsheviks. He urged Polish Americans to re-emigrate back to Poland following World War I. As a leader of American Polonia, he disputed the rule of Josef Pilsudski and thwarted their efforts to integrate and gain legitimacy from American Polish organizations. At the World Union of Poles from Abroad in 1934, he argued against the union of American Polonia with the Pilsudski-ruled Polish government. His arguments were instrumental in the exit of the 40-member American delegation from the union that year.

He died in Warsaw, days before the World Union of Poles from Abroad on July 28, 1934. He also had a strong interest in theater, and patronized Polish dramatic arts troupes in the U.S. The audience for Polish theater in the U.S. was very small and did not expand to Polish communities across the U.S. In his reflections, he recognized this failure as a heartfelt disappointment.

== Books ==
- Literatura polska i polsko-ameryka?ska dla ludu polskiego w Ameryco (1910) - an historical review of Polish literature.
- Na rok grunwaldzki; ludowi polskiemu w Ameryce i jego wodzom pod rozwag novel
- Historia Związku Narodowego Polskiego (1905) - history of the Polish National Alliance in America
- Z pennsylwańskiego piekła: powieść osnuta na tle życia naszych górników (1909) novel

== Sources ==
- Stanislaus A. Blejwas. "Stanislaw Osada: Immigrant Nationalist" (1993)
- Donald Pienkos. PNA: A Centennial History of the Polish National Alliance of the United States of America. 1984.
