= Robert Blobaum =

American historian

Robert Edward Blobaum
- Occupation: Historian

Academic work
- Discipline: History
- Institutions: West Virginia University

Robert Edward Blobaum is an American historian who is the Eberly Professor of History at West Virginia University. In 2018, he was elected president of the Polish Institute of Arts and Sciences of America for the 2018–2021 term, the first scholar of non-Polish origin to attain the post.

== Works ==
- Blobaum, Robert (2017). A Minor Apocalypse: Warsaw During the First World War. Cornell University Press. ISBN 978-1-5017-0523-6.
