= Rafał Taubenschlag =

Polish law historian

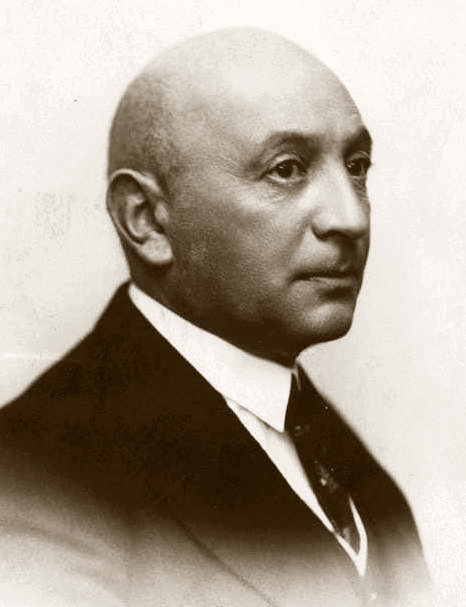
Rafał Taubenschlag, c. 1938

Rafał Taubenschlag (Raphael Taubenschlag; 8 May 1881, in Przemyśl – 25 June 1958, in Warsaw) was a Polish historian of law, a specialist in Roman law and papyrology.

== Life ==
Taubenschlag was born in Przemyśl to a Jewish family which ran a brewery for the Sanguszko family. His father's name was Baruch and his mother was Cecylia Cyrli née Goldhart. He finished high school in Przemyśl. In 1899 he began his studies in the Law School of the Jagiellonian University (UJ) in Kraków. In 1904 he was awarded a doctorate and in 1913 he was habilitated. In 1919 he became an assistant professor at the UJ and two years later a full professor. In 1927 he became a member of the Polish Academy of Learning and in 1929 he was made dean of the Law School at UJ.

Taubenschlag's son, Stanisław Taubenschlag was born in Kraków on January 30, 1920. He would move to the USA after World War II, where he assumed the name of Stanley Townsend. He published his memoirs under the title "To Be a Jew in Occupied Poland" (1996).

When World War II broke out Rafał managed to escape, thanks to help from his former students, to Romania. From there he made his way to France where he became dean of Roman Law at the Aix-Marseille University in Aix-en-Provence until the surrender of France to Nazi Germany in 1940. Subsequently he made his way to the United States where with help from the Rockefeller Foundation he obtained positions at the New School of Social Research (between 1940 and 1942) and Columbia (until 1947). While in United States where he was a co-founder of the Polish Institute of Arts and Sciences of America. In 1947 he returned to Poland where he became the Chair of the Department of Ancient Law at the University of Warsaw (UW), as well, together with Jerzy Manteuffel (one of the first Polish Papyrologists) of the Papyrology Program in the History Department of UW.

In 1954 he was awarded the Commander's Cross with Star.

In 1958, due to advanced glaucoma he began to suddenly lose his eyesight. He died the same year and was buried at Kraków's Rakowicki Cemetery.

According to some former students, toward the end of his life Taubenschlag became quite eccentric, often talking to himself as if carrying on academic debates with imaginary scholars and opponents. At the same time, his reputation as a weird old eccentric enabled him to publicly express political opinions which, in communist Poland during the Stalinist 1950s, would have gotten anyone else fired from his academic position or arrested.

== See also ==
- List of Poles
