= Marek Skulimowski =

Polish-born diplomat and President of the Kosciuszko Foundation

- Born: Lubaczów, Poland
- Education: University of Warsaw
- Occupations: Diplomat, businessman, philanthropist
- Known for: President and Executive Director of the Kosciuszko Foundation

Marek Skulimowski is a Polish-born diplomat, businessman, and philanthropist who serves as President and Executive Director of the Kosciuszko Foundation, a New York-based nonprofit dedicated to promoting educational and cultural exchange between the United States and Poland. He is also a board member of the National Library of Poland.

== Early life and education ==
Skulimowski is a native of Lubaczów in southeastern Poland. He earned a degree in American Studies from the University of Warsaw.

== Career ==
Before joining the nonprofit sector, Skulimowski worked in diplomacy and business. He served as Deputy Consul General of Poland in New York City and as Political Counselor at the Polish Embassy in Tel Aviv. Later, he transitioned to the private sector, becoming Director of U.S. Operations for the brand Inglot Cosmetics.

=== President of the Kosciuszko Foundation ===
In late 2016, Skulimowski was elected President and Executive Director of the Kosciuszko Foundation by its Board of Trustees. Since then, he has expanded the Foundation’s programs and international reach. In 2022, the Foundation awarded a record $2 million in scholarships and grants and organized seven English-immersion summer camps in Poland for over 600 children, supported by 67 American volunteers.

Under Skulimowski’s leadership, the Foundation also opened chapters in Florida and Michigan and raised $1.8 million to support Ukrainian students and refugees, in collaboration with the Smithsonian Cultural Rescue Initiative.

In 2025, the Foundation celebrated its 100th anniversary, with a series of centennial events and expanded cultural programming noted by media as “setting new benchmarks in cultural diplomacy.”

=== Humanitarian and cultural initiatives ===
In early 2022, Skulimowski traveled to the Polish-Ukrainian border near Lubaczów and Budomierz to assist with refugee relief efforts, providing food, medicine, and shelter. He opened his own home to refugees and launched a U.S. fundraising campaign that raised nearly $2 million.

He also led KF donations of multimedia equipment to Polish-language schools in Ukraine. In December 2023, he personally visited School No.10 in Lviv and the Polish school in Mościska to deliver supplies. In Nahachiv, he participated in the launch of a cross-border education center organized by the Folkowisko Foundation.

Skulimowski has also led KF initiatives focused on recovering Polish art looted during World War II. His efforts earned him the nickname “Polish Indiana Jones” from former KF chairman Alex Storozynski.

In 2024, he was appointed by the Polish Minister of Culture to the Executive Board of the National Library of Poland, formalizing his role in cultural preservation.

== Awards and recognition ==
In 2023, Skulimowski was nominated for the Jerzy Giedroyc Award (Nagroda “Rzeczpospolitej” im. Jerzego Giedroycia), recognizing his contributions to civic life and regional dialogue.

In 2025, the Polish-American Pulaski Association named him “Man of the Year” for his leadership and cultural diplomacy.

The Kosciuszko Foundation itself has received the Skalny Civic Achievement Award for its contributions to Polish-American relations during his presidency. During his tenure, the Kosciuszko Foundation also received the Medal for Merits to the Youth from the Polish Youth Association for its scholarship and exchange initiatives.

== Personal life ==
Skulimowski is married to Agnieszka Skulimowska. The couple has three sons Edmund, Florian, and Filip.
