= Gniewosz of Dalewice =

Gniewosz of Dalewice (Polish: Gniewosz z Dalewic; died after 1410) of Clan Kościesza was a Polish knight and a courtier of King Władysław Jagiełło and Queen Jadwiga of Poland. A Chamberlain of Kraków, along with Władysław Opolczyk, he was the main partisan of William of Austria (originally betrothed to Jadwiga), and opposed Jadwiga's marriage to Jagiełło. After it eventually happened in 1378, he tried to prevent it from being consummated. However, as soon as Jadwiga turned 12, Jagiełło reached Kraków and the marriage became valid. Gniewosz started an intrigue and spread gossip that, despite the marriage, Jadwiga was having an affair with William. Tried for his words by a Sejm tribunal in Wiślica, Gniewosz was sentenced to barking-off his lies. The penalty, common in medieval Poland, forced Gniewosz to publicly prone himself under the table and announce that what I told about the queen was a dogly lie and bark several times.

Despite the verdict, Gniewosz continued his career at the court even after Jadwiga's death. In 1406 he became the Steward of the Crown, castellan of Sandomierz and a starost of Lwów. In 1410 he commanded the Strzegomia banner during the battle of Grunwald.
