= Rudkhaneh, Jiroft =

Rudkhaneh رودخانه
- Village
- Location within Iran
- Coordinates: 29°20′00″N 57°29′00″E
- Country: Iran
- Province: Kerman
- County: Jiroft
- Bakhsh: Sarduiyeh
- Rural District: Gevar

Population (2006)
  - Total: 26
- Time zone: UTC+3:30 (IRST)
  - Summer (DST): UTC+4:30 (IRDT)

Rudkhaneh (Persian: رودخانه, also Romanized as Rūdkhāneh; also known as Pūl and Rūdkhāneh Pol) is a village in Gevar Rural District, Sarduiyeh District, Jiroft County, Kerman Province, Iran. At the 2006 census, its population was 26, in 7 families.
