= The Polish Review =

Academic journal, founded 1956, covering Polish topics

- Language: English
- Edited by: James S. Pula

Publication details
- History: 1956–present
- Publisher: Polish Institute of Arts and Sciences of America (United States)
- Frequency: Quarterly

Standard abbreviations
- ISO 4: Pol. Rev.

Indexing
- ISSN: 0032-2970 (print); 2330-0841 (web)
- LCCN: 57034642
- JSTOR: 00322970
- OCLC no.: 260158745

Links
- Journal homepage; Online archive

The Polish Review is an English-language academic journal published quarterly in New York City by the Polish Institute of Arts and Sciences of America. The Polish Review was established in 1956, as a successor of the PAU Bulletin. It has been described as having as a mission "to be the premier English-language outlet for Polish-centered scholarship".

== Editors-in-chief ==
The following persons have been editors-in-chief of this journal:

- Stanisław Skrzypek (1956)
- Ludwik Krzyżanowski (1956–1986)
- Stanisław Barańczak (1986–1990)
- Joseph Wieczerzak (1991–2007)
- Charles S. Kraszewski (2008–2011)
- James S. Pula (2012 –2014)
- Neal Pease (2015-2020)
- Halina Filipowicz (2020–present)

== Indexing ==
The Polish Review is abstracted in Historical Abstracts, ABC POL SCI, America: History and Life, Index of Articles on Jewish Studies, MLA International Bibliography, and International Political Science Abstracts. It is also listed among the journals recognized by the American Historical Association.
