= Lithuanian Music Hall =

Lithuanian Hall (Lietuvių Namai)
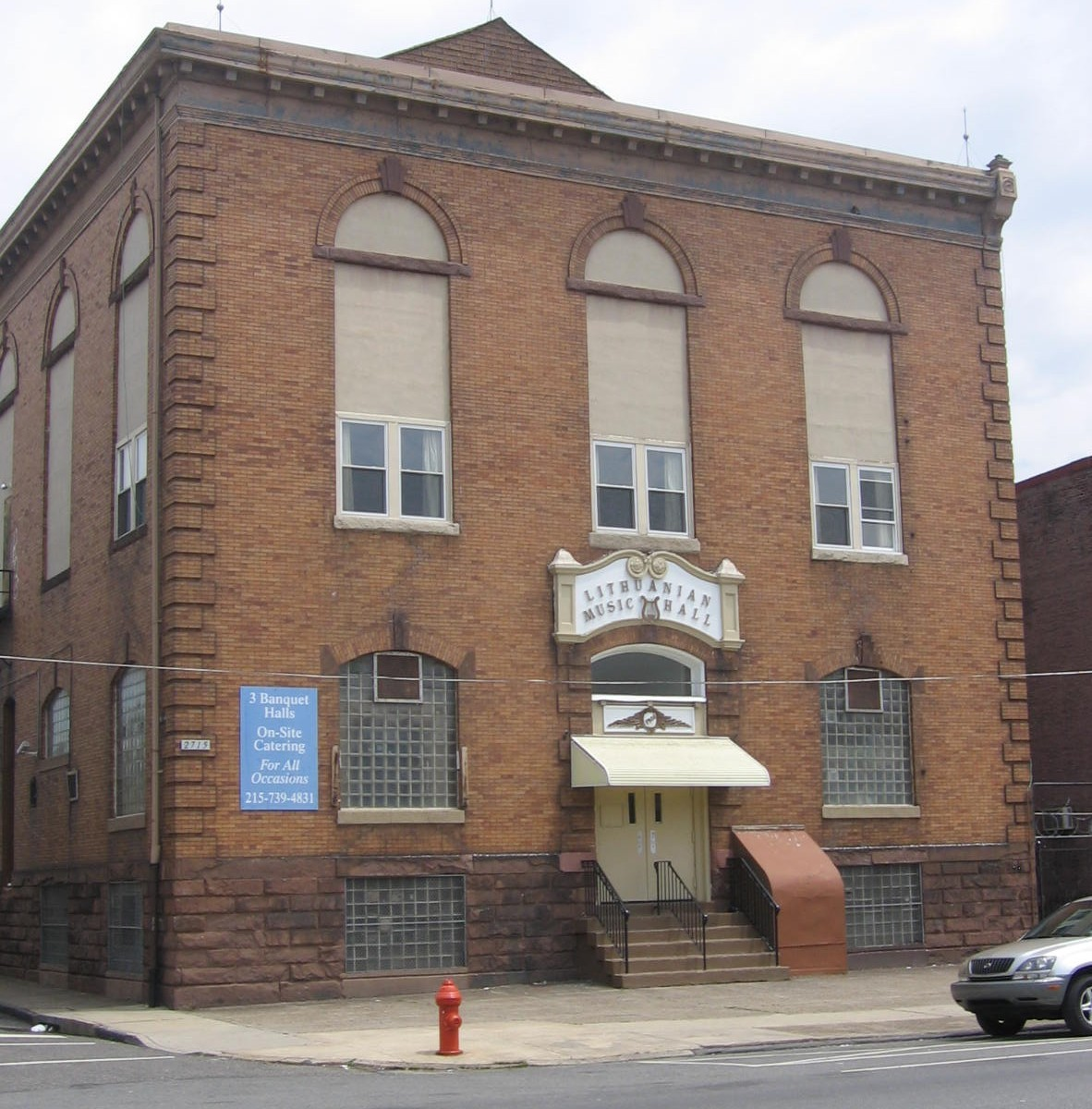
- Lithuanian Hall on 17 May, 2008
- Interactive map of Lithuanian Hall (Lietuvių Namai)
- Location: 2715 East Allegheny Avenue; Philadelphia, Pennsylvania, United States
- Coordinates: 39°59′02″N 75°06′07″W
- Type: Club and cultural organization

Construction
- Opened: 1907

Website
- Lithuanian Music Hall Association official website

The Lithuanian Hall (Lithuanian: Lietuvių Namai), also known as Lithuanian Music Hall, is the home of the Lithuanian Music Hall Association and the Lithuanian Cultural Center. It is a private club and cultural organization located in Philadelphia, Pennsylvania and serves as a recreation center and meeting house for social events, including dances, weddings, musical events, art exhibits, and cultural events. The hall was founded in 1907 to serve the needs of the Lithuanian community in Philadelphia, Pennsylvania.
