= Stephen Mizwa =

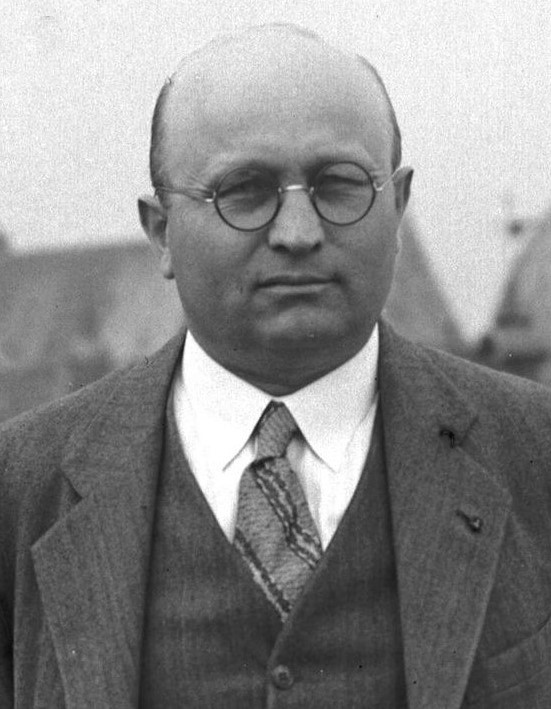
Image of Stefan Piotr Mierzwa

Stephen Paul Mizwa, Stefan Piotr Mierzwa (November 12, 1892, Rakszawa – January, 1971, Houston) was the founder and long-time president of the Kosciuszko Foundation, a Polish-American scholarly and cultural institution headquartered in New York City.

== Life ==
Stephen Mizwa came to the United States in 1909, aged about 17. His first goal was to reach Northampton, Massachusetts, where an earlier Polish immigrant, Joseph Stonina, lived.

Though accepted at Princeton University, Mizwa entered Amherst College, which granted him a full scholarship. In 1920 he graduated cum laude and Phi Beta Kappa, and the following year he received a master's degree from Harvard University. In 1921, aged 29, he became an assistant professor of economics at Drake University.

In 1923, at the request of the Polish government, Dr. Mizwa organized the Polish American Scholarship Committee, among the first exchange programs with renascent Poland. Five of the first eight students sponsored by the program came to the United States to study business administration and economics at American universities.

The Polish American Scholarship Committee was the embryo of the Kosciuszko Foundation subsequently established in 1925, a scholarly and cultural institution that Mizwa would head for several decades. When Mizwa gained financial support from Samuel M. Vauclain, president of the Baldwin Locomotive Works, which had sold locomotives to Poland, the fledgling foundation was well launched.

== Works ==
- Nicolaus Copernicus, 1543–1943, New York, Kosciuszko Foundation, 1943.
- Frederic Chopin, 1810–1849, Greenwood Press Reprint, 1983.

== See also ==
- List of Poles
