= Mieczysław Haiman =

Polish-American journalist and historian (1888–1949)

Mieczysław Haiman also known as Miecislaus Haiman (31 March 1888 in Złoczów – 15 January 1949 in Chicago) was a Polish-American journalist and historian. He has been called "The most celebrated historian of American Polonia in the twentieth century".

Since 1969 Polish American Historical Association gives out the Mieczysław Haiman Award (also known as the Miecislaus Haiman Award) "for sustained contribution to the study of Polish Americans".
