= Kosciuszko Foundation =

Charitable foundation in New York, United States

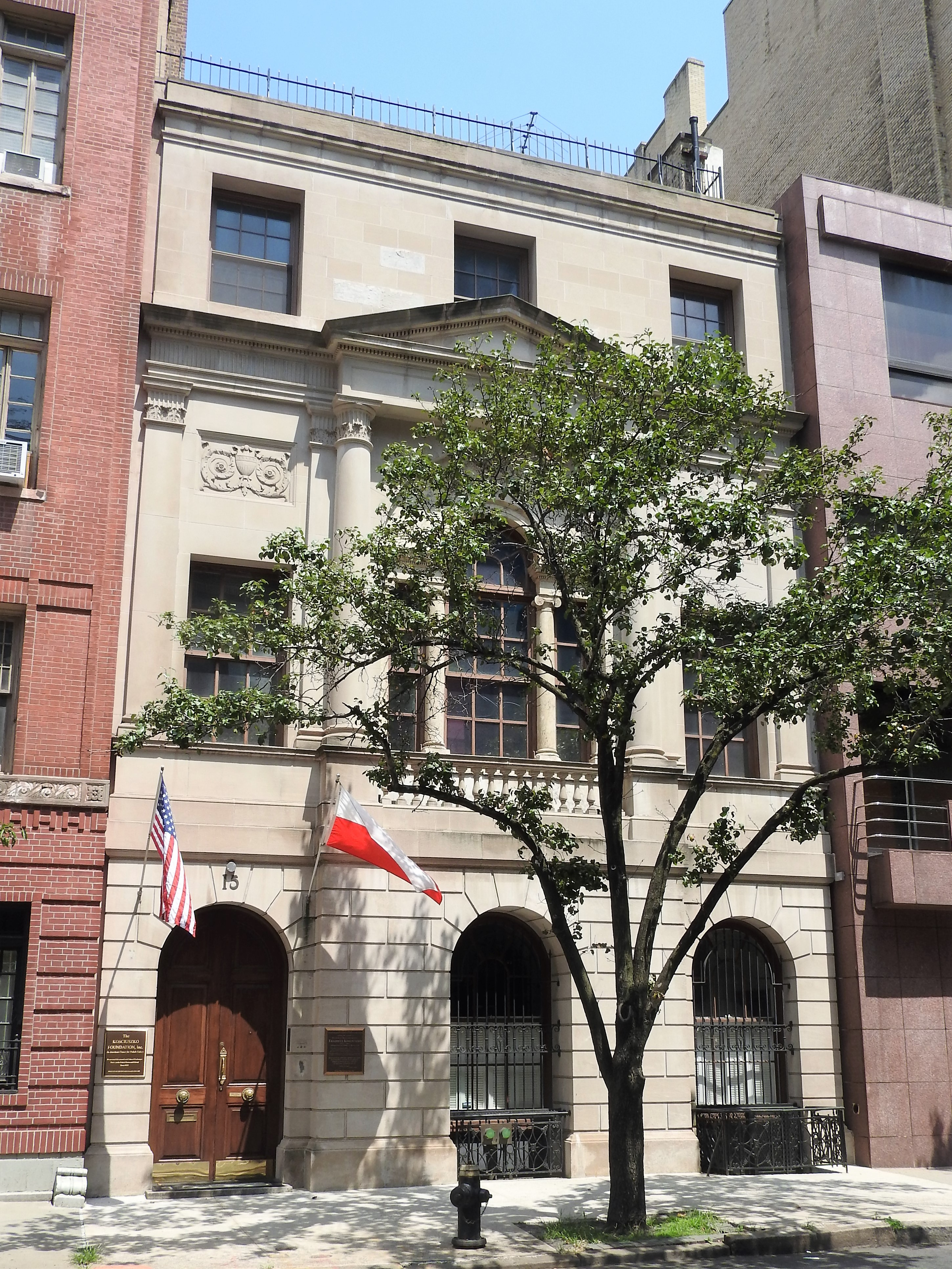
- Founder: Stephen Mizwa
- Established: 1925
- Mission: Promotion of cultural and educational exchanges between the United States and Poland
- President: Marek Skulimowski
- Slogan: An American Center for Polish Culture
- Formerly called: Polish American Scholarship Committee
- Address: 15 E 65th St; New York, NY 10065
- Location: New York City
- Coordinates: 40°46′04″N 73°58′17″W
- Interactive map of Kosciuszko Foundation
- Website: www.thekf.org

The Kosciuszko Foundation is a charitable foundation based in New York City. It was created by Stephen Mizwa to fund programs that promote Polish-American intellectual and artistic exchange.

== History ==
The Polish American Scholarship Committee was established in 1923 by Dr. Stephen Mizwa to bring students to universities in the United States. Mizwa worked with the president of Vassar College, Henry Noble MacCracken, who had visited Poland. The two expanded the Scholarship Committee's mission to promote cultural and educational exchanges between the United States and Poland. In December 1925, the Scholarship Committee changed into the new Kosciuszko Foundation.

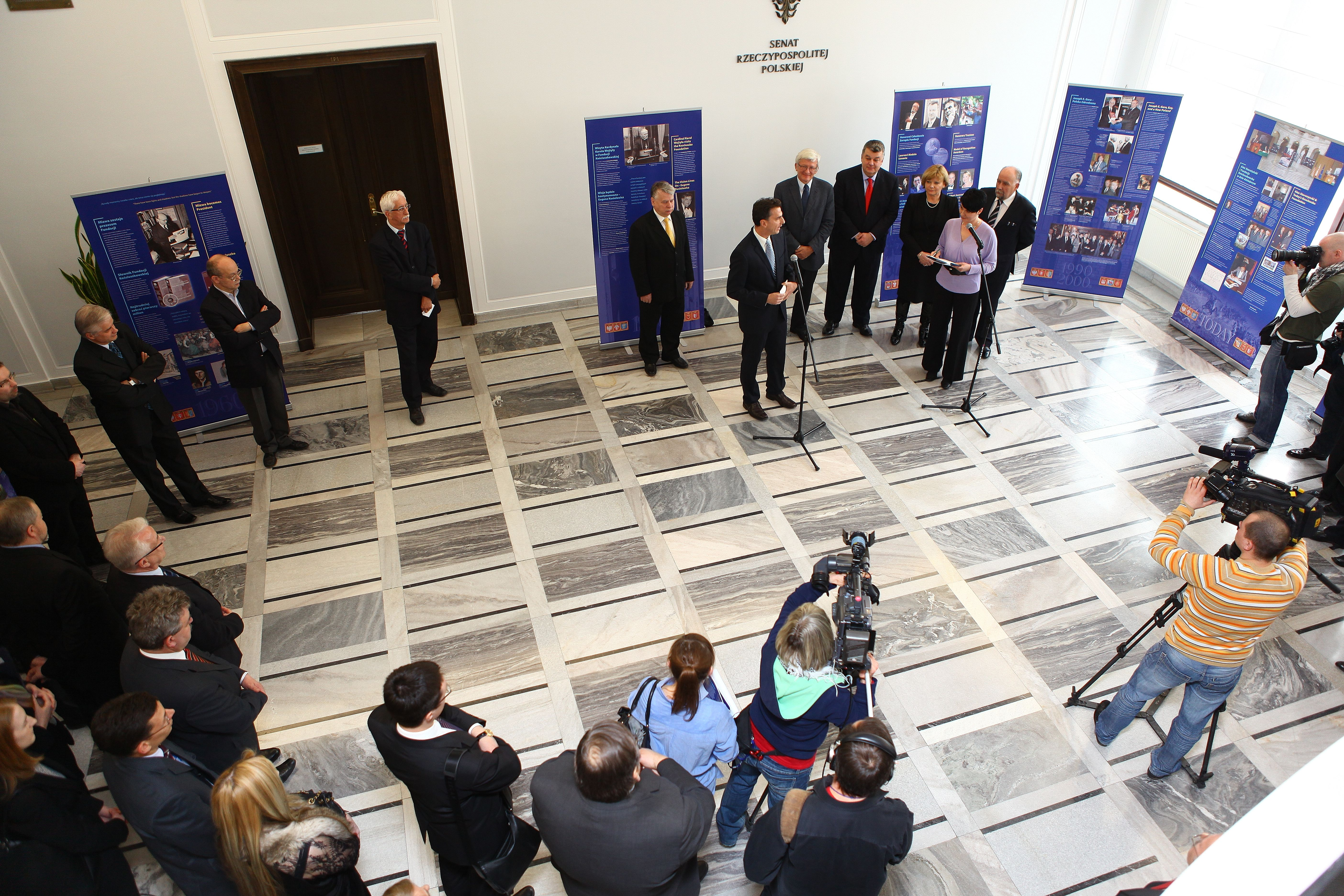
US Ambassador to Poland Lee A. Feinstein at the opening ceremony of the exhibition The Kosciuszko Foundation − the American Center of Polish Culture in the Polish Senate (2011)

The Foundation is named in honour of Tadeusz Kościuszko, a Polish general and patriot, who after unsuccessful battles in uprising for Polish freedom, migrated to North America and fought in the American Revolutionary War. The organization was founded in 1925, on the eve of the 150th anniversary of Kosciuszko's enlistment in the American liberation cause.

The headquarters are in a limestone neo-Renaissance three-story mansion built in 1917. The building was designed by Harry Allan Jacobs for James J. Van Alen, whose in-laws, the Astors, lived down the block. The second-story ballroom functions as a gallery, as well as a lecture and concert hall for chamber-music and solo recitals.

== Activities ==
The foundation provides scholarships and fellowships to Polish students, scholars, and artists. They were invited for research or educational stay by an institution of higher education in the United States. Several programs are also targeted at Polish musicians. Grants for U.S. citizens include research and study opportunities in Poland.

The foundation organizes cultural events for the Polish community. It is the largest public institution in North America dedicated solely to Polish art. The foundation highlights Polish art for Polish Heritage month. Exhibitions are held that draw from the permanent collection of oils, watercolors, prints, drawings, ceramics, sculpture, tapestries and photographs. An annual Chopin Piano Competition showcases young talent.

The foundation sponsors and publishes the biggest Polish-American and American-Polish dictionary, known as Kosciuszko Foundation Dictionary and published in a book and CD-ROM format. The recent version, titled New Kosciuszko Foundation Dictionary, was issued in 2003. Its editor-in-chief was a renowned Polish professor of the English language.

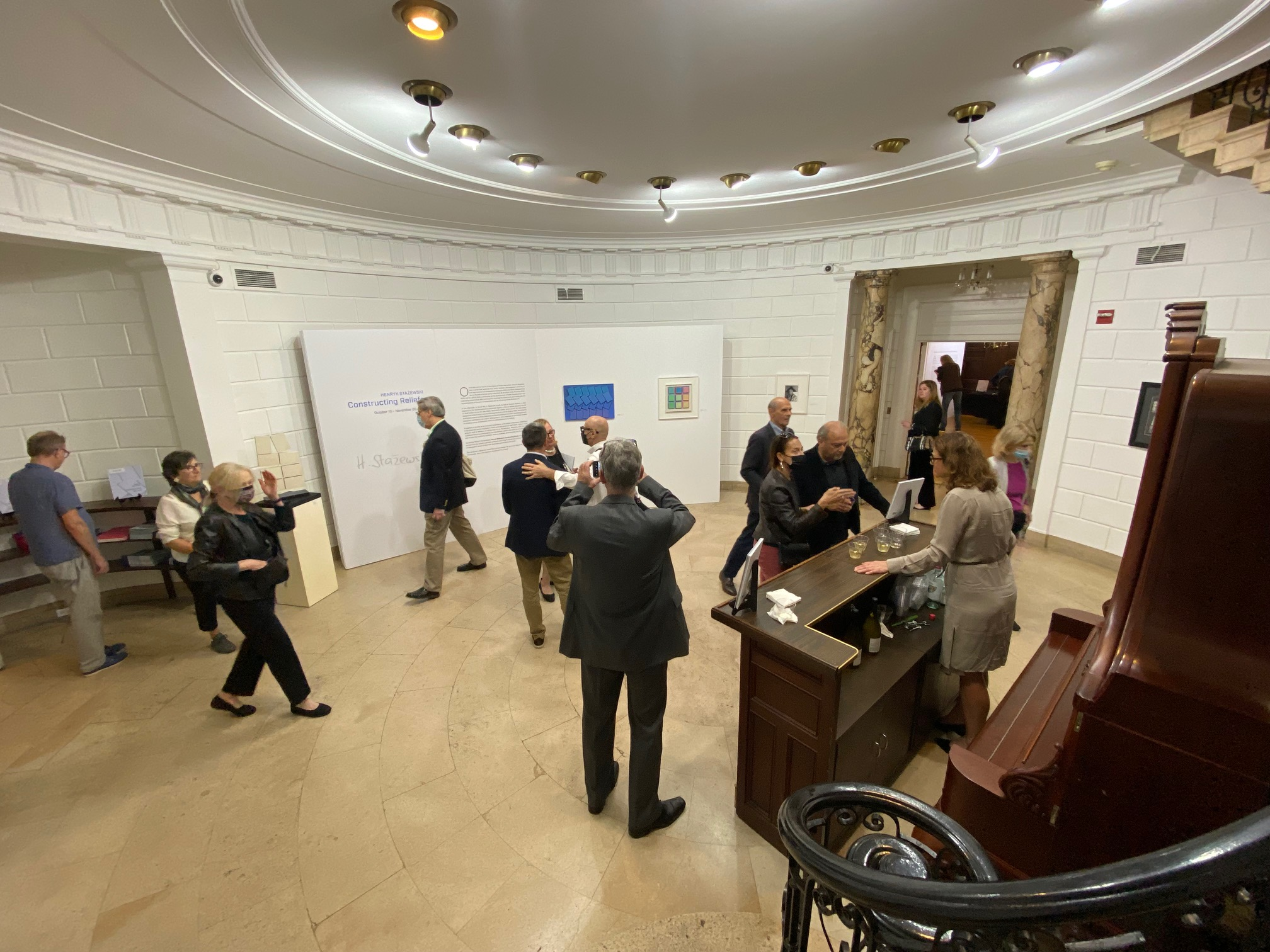
Opening of "Henryk Stazewski: Constructing Reliefs" exhibition at the Kosciuszko Foundation in New York (October 14, 2021)

The foundation's Washington office provides a venue for local Polish-American events through a wide range of activities, including films, concerts, exhibitions, educational programs, publications, and seminars. It uses its website to provide information on events, collections and topics of interest to those who interested in Poland.

== Regional chapters ==
The Kosciuszko Foundation has regional chapters in:

- Buffalo (Western New York State)
- Chicago, Illinois
- Denver, Colorado (Rocky Mountain)
- Houston (Texas)
- Ohio
- Florida
- Philadelphia, Pennsylvania
- Pittsburgh, Pennsylvania
- Springfield, Massachusetts (New England)
- Warsaw, Poland
- Washington, D.C.
