= Polish Institute of Arts and Sciences of America =

Polish Institute of Arts & Sciences of America
- Polski Instytut Naukowy w Ameryce

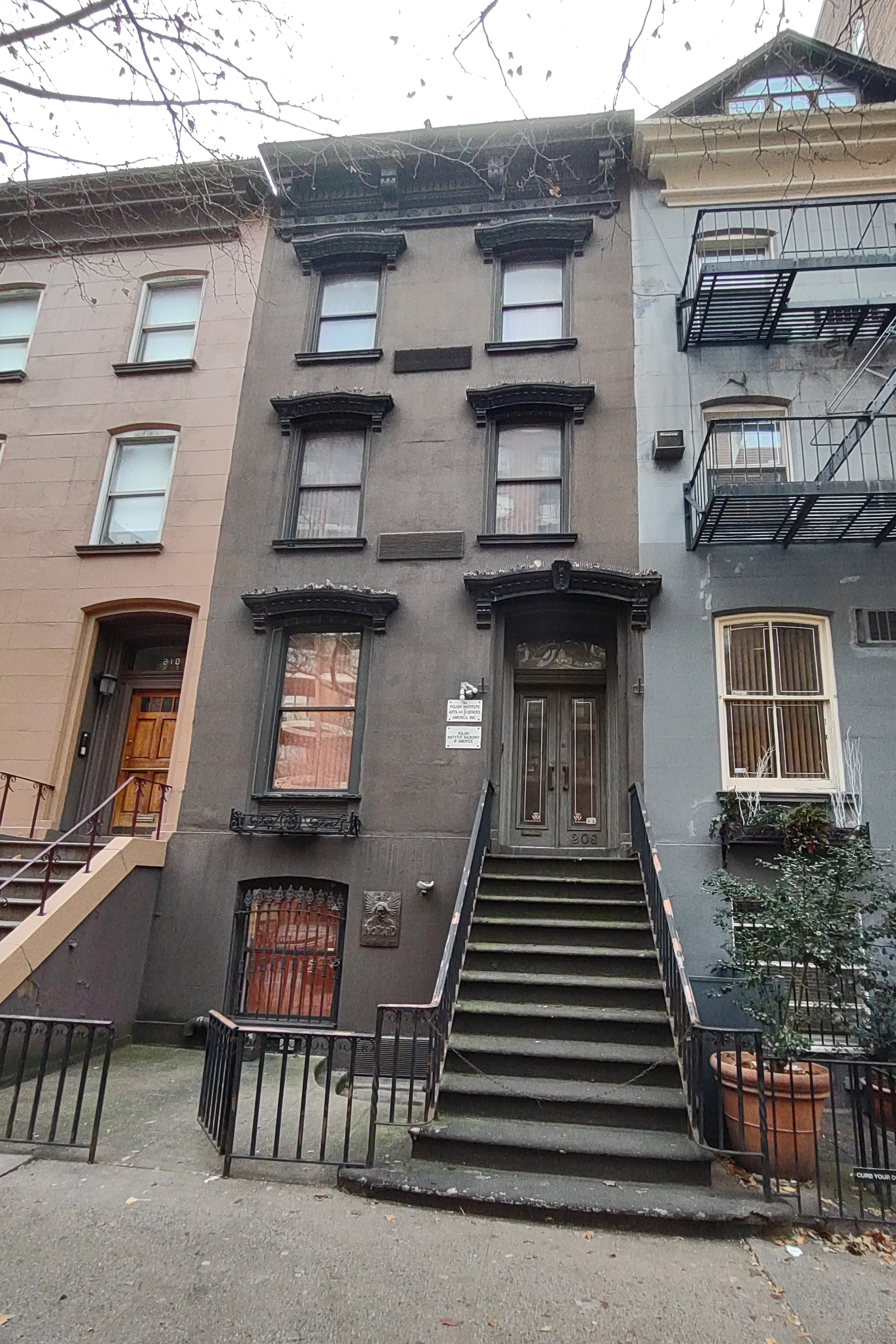
- Headquarters of PIASA in Manhattan
- Abbreviation: PIASA
- Formation: 1942
- Headquarters: 208 East 30th Street
- Location: New York, New York
- President: Anna Muller
- Vice President: Neal Pease
- Executive Director: Bozena Leven
- Secretary: Renata C. Vickrey
- Board of directors: Robert Blobaum; James S. Pula; Wojciech Sadurski; Piotr Wróbel; Geneviève Zubrzycki
- Publication: The Polish Review
- Website: piasa.org

The Polish Institute of Arts and Sciences of America (PIASA) is a Polish-American scholarly institution headquartered in Manhattan (New York City), at 208 East 30th Street.

== History ==
The Institute was founded during the height of World War II, on 12 May 1942, by Polish scholars, including historian Stanisław Kot, anthropologist Bronisław Malinowski, poet Jan Lechoń, and historians Oskar Halecki and Rafał Taubenschlag, to continue the work and tradition of the prewar Polish Academy of Learning (Polska Akademia Umiejętności), headquartered in Kraków, Poland, which had been destroyed by Nazi Germany in 1939.

Since World War II, the Institute has continued its work of promoting Polish and Polish-American excellence in learning, and of advancing the knowledge of Polish history and culture in the English-speaking world. Since Poland's resumption of a more complete sovereignty following the collapse of communism in central and eastern Europe, the Polish Institute has established collaborative scholarly relations with the restored Polish Academy of Learning and numerous other Polish academic and cultural centers.

Since its creation, the Institute has included some 1,500 scholars and artists, including Zbigniew Brzeziński, Jan Henryk De Rosen, Stanisław Skrowaczewski, Aleksander Wolszczan, Hilary Koprowski, Waclaw Szybalski, Michael Novak, Bohdan Pawłowicz and Nobel Prize winners Roald Hoffmann, Czesław Miłosz and Frank Wilczek.

One of the major areas of the Institute's research has been the history of Poles in the United States.

The Institute maintains a library and archives, and publishes a peer-reviewed scholarly quarterly, The Polish Review.

The Houston Chapter founded the journal Houston Sarmatian in 1981. In 1988 it was renamed the Sarmatian Review.

== See also ==
- Charity and nonprofit organizations in the United States
