= Polish American Historical Association =

The Polish American Historical Association (PAHA), founded in 1942, is a scholarly not-for-profit association devoted to the study of Polish-American history and culture.

Originally a section of the larger Polish Institute of Arts and Sciences in America, the PAHA soon became an independent organization. On 11 September 1942, historian Oskar Halecki proposed the founding of an autonomous historical institution and chose Mieczyslaw Haiman of the Polish Museum of America in Chicago as its founding president.

Since 1944 the PAHA has been publishing Polish American Studies, an interdisciplinary journal focused primarily on the social sciences and humanities in relation to the American Polonia. It is currently edited by Anna Jaroszyńska-Kirchmann.

The PAHA is an affiliate of the American Historical Association.

== Structure ==
PAHA is governed by a board of directors, elected by the membership of the Association, consisting of eight officers and twelve council members. Elections are held every two years. Lists of current and past officers can be found on the PAHA website.

== Publications ==
In addition to its scholarly journal, Polish American Studies, edited by Prof. Anna Jaroszynska-Kirchmann (for the previous 30 years edited by Prof. James Pula), the organization publishes a semi-annual PAHA Newsletter, and a blog (edited by Dr. Anna Muller). The Association's The Polish American Encyclopedia, edited by Prof. James Pula, was published in 2011 by McFarland Books. Other notable publications sponsored by PAHA include James Pula, ed., PAHA: A 75th Anniversary History of the Polish American Historical Association (Polish American Historical Association, 2017) and Ewa E. Barczyk, ed., Footprints of Polonia: Polish Historical Sites Across North America (Hippocrene, 2022).

== Conferences ==
Along with the American Historical Association, the PAHA hosts an annual conference. The 79th Annual Meeting took place in Philadelphia in January 2023.

== Awards ==
Each year at its annual meeting, PAHA bestows awards for deserving articles, books, scholars, and others. PAHA also bestows Creative Arts Awards, the Pula Distinguished Service Award, and Young Scholar Travel Grants. Most awards are made annually, and some occasionally.

== Special projects ==
PAHA makes appeals for memoirs and historical artifacts among Americans of Polish descent to aid in its historical research. PAHA secured archival storage space at the Central Connecticut State Library with strong interest in acquiring firsthand memoirs and documents from the postwar Polish American diaspora and their current descendants.
