= List of Polish Americans =

This is a list of notable Polish Americans, including both original immigrants who obtained citizenship and their American descendants.

== Academics ==
- Norman Finkelstein, political scientist specialising in the Israeli–Palestinian conflict; of Polish Jewish ancestry
- Leon M. Goldstein (died 1999), President of Kingsborough Community College, and acting Chancellor of the City University of New York
- Joseph S. Murphy (1933–1998), President of Queens College, President of Bennington College, and Chancellor of the City University of New York
- Joseph Opala (born 1950), scholar of African American history

== Arts and entertainment ==
=== Actors and personalities – TV, radio and film ===
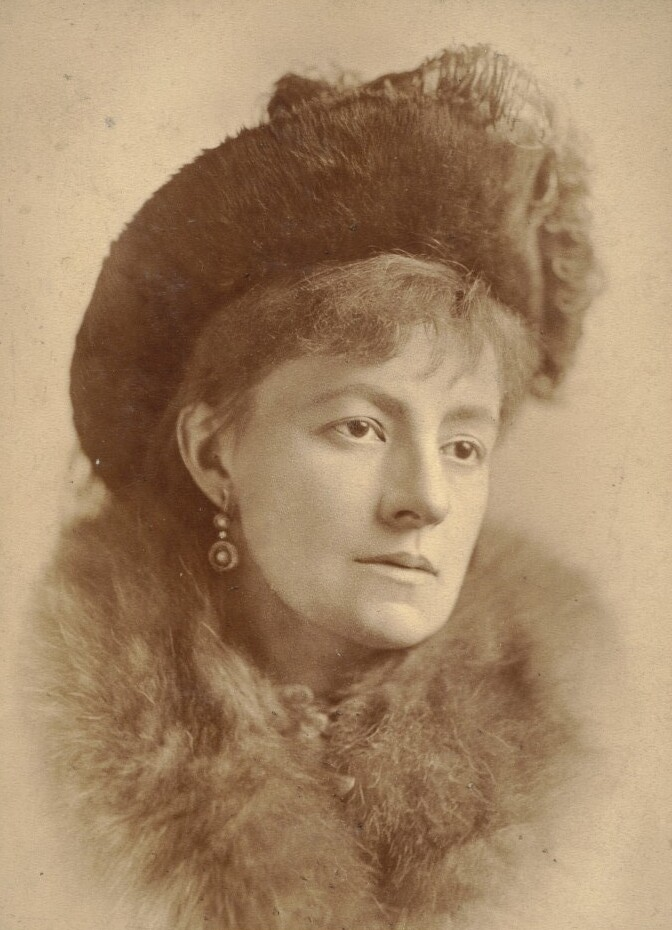
Helena Modjeska, an actress who specialized in Shakespearean roles

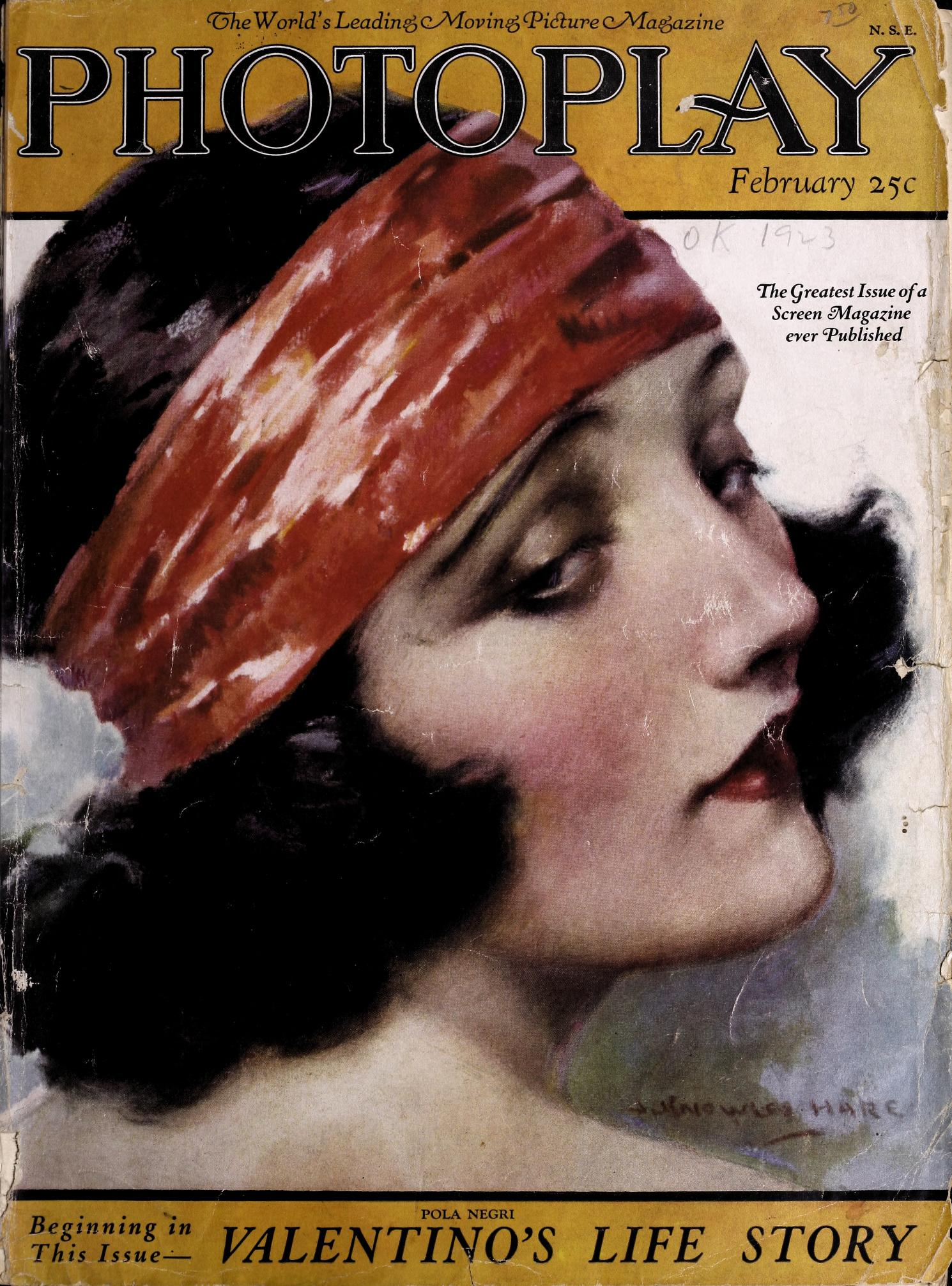
Pola Negri, stage and film actress

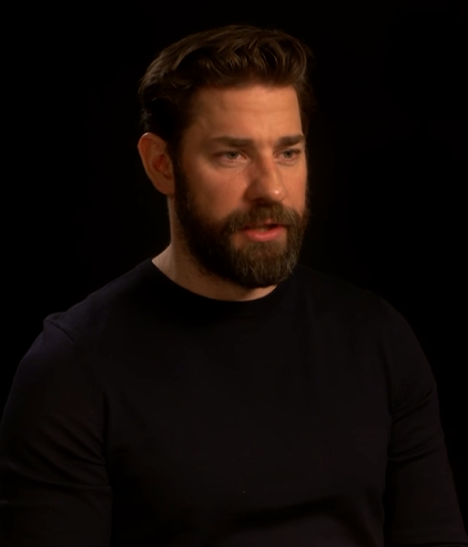
John Krasinski, TV and film actor (The Office)

- Nick Adams (1931–1968), film actor; mother was of Polish descent
- Grant Aleksander (born 1960), film and daytime actor, Guiding Light
- Pico Alexander (born 1991), actor; parents are Polish immigrants
- Stanley Andrews (1891–1969), TV/radio actor
- Anna Anka (born 1971), actress, model, and author
- David Arquette (born 1971), actor, director, producer; mother (née Nowak) was of Polish Jewish and Russian Jewish descent
- Patricia Arquette (born 1968), actress, director, producer; mother (née Nowak) was of Polish Jewish and Russian Jewish descent
- Rosanna Arquette (born 1959), actress, director, producer; mother (née Nowak) was of Polish Jewish and Russian Jewish descent
- Jacob Artist (born 1992), actor, singer, and dancer; mother is of Polish descent
- Joe Augustyn (born 1952), screenwriter, movie producer
- Jake T. Austin (born 1994), actor; father is of part Polish descent
- Pat Benatar (born 1953), singer and composer
- Carroll Baker (born 1931), film actress and author; father of Polish ancestry
- Christine Baranski (born 1952), actress
- Kristen Bell (born 1980), film/television actress (Veronica Mars), mother is of Polish descent
- Maria Bello (born 1967), actress (A History of Violence, Thank You for Smoking, The Cooler); mother is of Polish descent
- Brian Benben (born 1956), television actor; father was of Polish descent
- Jack Benny (1894–1974), comedian, vaudevillian, and actor for radio, television, and film; of Polish Jewish descent
- Carlos Bernard (né Carlos Bernard Papierski; born 1962), actor (24)
- Craig Bierko (born 1964), actor and singer; father has Polish ancestry
- Rebecca Black (born 1997), singer, father of partial Polish descent
- Marc Blucas (born 1972), actor; paternal grandfather of Polish descent
- Alex Borstein (born 1971), actress, voice actress, writer, and comedian; of Polish Jewish descent
- Lisa Boyle (born 1968), actress and model; of part Polish descent
- Andrew Bryniarski (born 1969), actor and bodybuilder; father of Polish descent
- Carolina Bartczak (born 1985), actress; born in Germany, both parents are Polish
- Adrien Brody (born 1973), actor; father has Polish ancestry
- Kylie Bunbury (born 1989), actress, mother (née Novak) was of Polish descent
- Amanda Bynes (born 1986), actress and comedian; paternal grandmother was of Polish descent
- Liz Cackowski (born 1975), comedy writer and actress; of part Polish descent
- Nicolas Cage (born 1964), actor; maternal grandmother was of Polish descent (surname Siputa)
- Bobby Campo (born 1983), actor; paternal grandmother of Polish descent
- Steve Carell (born 1962), actor; mother of Polish descent
- Jessica Cauffiel (born 1976), actress and singer; paternal grandmother of Polish ancestry
- Jennifer Connelly (born 1970), Academy Award-winning actress; her mother was of Russian Jewish and Polish Jewish descent
- Robert Conrad (1935–2020; né Conrad Robert Falk), film and television actor; Polish on father (Leonard Falkowski)'s side
- D.J. Cotrona (born 1980), actor; mother of half Polish descent
- Elżbieta Czyżewska (1938–2010), Polish-born award-winning theater, film and TV actress
- Larry David (born 1947), comedian, writer, actor, director, and television producer; mother was of Polish descent.
- Jenna Dewan-Tatum (born 1980), actress, model, and dancer; paternal grandmother of Polish descent
- Janice Dickinson (born 1955), model/reality television star; mother was of Polish descent
- James Charles Dickinson (born 1999), YouTuber, model, make-up artist, Internet personality; father is of Polish descent
- Dagmara Dominczyk (born 1976), Polish-born American actress; sister of Marika Dominczyk
- Marika Dominczyk (born 1980), Polish-born American actress; sister of Dagmara Dominczyk
- David Duchovny (born 1960), actor; paternal grandmother of Polish Jewish ancestry
- John Duda (born 1977), actor; father of Polish descent
- Anne Dudek (born 1975), television actress (Mad Men, House M.D.)
- Alexis Dziena (born 1984), film and television actress (When in Rome), of part Polish descent
- George Dzundza (born 1945), actor, of part Polish descent
- Zac Efron (born 1987), actor, paternal grandfather was the son of Polish Jewish parents
- Jesse Eisenberg (born 1983), actor, of Polish Jewish and Ukrainian Jewish descent
- Linda Emond (born 1959), actress; paternal grandmother was of Polish descent
- Briana Evigan (born 1986), actress; of part Polish descent
- Peter Falk (1927–2011), actor; of Polish Jewish descent
- Jason David Frank (1973–2022), actor and mixed martial artist; mother of half-Polish descent
- Johnny Galecki (born 1975), actor; father of Polish descent
- Arlene Golonka (1936–2021), actress
- Hedwig Gorski (born 1949), poet and author; father of Polish descent
- Katerina Graham (born 1989), actress (Vampire Diaries), mother of Polish and Russian Jewish descent
- Gilda Gray (1901–1959), actress and dancer
- Ari Graynor (born 1983), actress; father of Polish descent
- Alice Greczyn (born 1986), actress
- Kim Greist (born 1958), actress; Polish maternal grandmother
- Zach Grenier (born 1954), actor; mother of Polish descent
- Sasha Grey (born 1988), actress; maternal great-grandfather of Polish descent
- Khrystyne Haje (born 1968), actress
- Chelsea Handler (born 1975), actress and comedian; maternal great-grandmother of Polish origin
- Elisabeth Hasselbeck (born 1977), co-host of The View and contestant on Survivor
- Izabella Scorupco (born 1970), actress
- Marilu Henner (born 1952), television actress (Taxi) and health book author; father was of Polish descent
- John Hodiak (1914–1955), film actor
- Bonnie Hunt (born 1961), Golden Globe and Emmy Award-nominated actress, comedian, writer, director, television producer, and daytime television host, maternal grandparents were Polish
- Ryan Hurst (born 1976), actor; mother of Polish descent
- Scarlett Johansson (born 1984), actress (Lost in Translation); mother is of Polish descent
- Jake Johnson (born 1978), actor; maternal grandmother, Lucille/Lucy Kopacz, was of Polish descent
- Angelina Jolie (born 1975), Academy Award-winning film actress; mother was approximately 1 quarter Polish
- Jenny Jones (born 1946), talk show host who hosted The Jenny Jones Show from 1991 to 2002
- Jane Kaczmarek (born 1955), Emmy-nominated actress Malcolm in the Middle and Raising the Bar
- Nina Kaczorowski (born 1975), actress, stunt woman, model and dancer
- Brittney Karbowski (born 1986), voice actress
- John Karlen (1933–2020), Emmy Award-winning stage, film, and television actor (Dark Shadows, Cagney & Lacey)
- Vincent Kartheiser (born 1979), actor; maternal great-grandmother was Polish, from Błonie
- Harvey Keitel (born 1939), Academy Award-nominated actor, of Polish Jewish and Romanian Jewish descent
- Ted Knight (1923–1986), Emmy Award-winning film and television actor (The Mary Tyler Moore Show, Too Close for Comfort)
- Victoria Konefal (born 1996), TV actor (Days of Our Lives)
- Kristof Konrad (born 1962), TV and film actor (Red Sparrow, House of Cards)
- Gene Koprowski (born 1965), Emmy Nominated TV writer (Technopolitics-PBS, The Cotton Club (U.S. TV show)
- Jane Krakowski (born 1968), film, stage and television actress (Ally McBeal, 30 Rock); winner of the 2003 Tony Award; of three quarters Polish descent
- John Krasinski (born 1979), TV and film actor (The Office); of half Polish and half Irish descent
- Cheslie Kryst (1991–2022), Miss USA 2019, father is of Polish descent
- Lisa Kudrow (born 1963), actress, of Polish Jewish and Belarusian Jewish descent
- Shia LaBeouf (born 1986), actor, voice actor, and comedian, mother is of Polish Jewish and Russian Jewish descent
- Lisa Lampanelli (born 1961), comedian and actress; maternal grandfather, Stanley Velgot, of Polish descent
- Carole Landis (1919–1948), film actress; mother was of Polish descent and father of Norwegian descent
- Joe Lando (born 1961), TV and film actor (Dr. Quinn, Medicine Woman)
- Matt Lanter (born 1983), actor and model; of part Polish descent
- Téa Leoni (born 1966), film and TV actress; paternal grandmother was of Polish descent
- Logan Lerman (born 1992), actor; his maternal grandfather was a Polish Jewish immigrant, and the rest of Logan's ancestry is Russian Jewish, Lithuanian Jewish, and other Polish Jewish
- Justin Long (born 1978), film and television actor; his mother, former Broadway actress Wendy Lesniak, is of half Polish descent
- Josh Lucas (born 1971), actor
- Chloé Lukasiak (born 2001), actress and dancer; of partial Polish descent
- Eric Mabius (born 1971), TV and film actor (Ugly Betty, The Crow), mother is of Polish descent
- Richard "Mach" Machowicz, host of Discovery Channel's Future Weapons, former Navy SEAL
- Rose Marie (1923–2017), TV and film actress (The Dick Van Dyke Show); mother of Polish heritage and father of Italian descent
- Ross Martin (1920–1981), Polish Jewish immigrant, TV and film actor (The Wild Wild West)
- Ignacyo Matynia (born 1992), actor; born in Poland and moved to the United States as a child
- Joseph Mazzello (born 1983), actor; maternal grandfather of Polish descent
- Jenny McCarthy (born 1972), actress and comedian; mother of part Polish descent
- Piotr Michael (born 1988), actor, comedian and voice actor; parents of Polish ancestry
- Izabella Miko (born 1981), Polish-American actress and dancer
- Patrycja Mikula (born 1983), also known as Patricia Mikula, model and Playboy Cybergirl
- Wentworth Miller (born 1972), actor, model, screenwriter, and producer; maternal great-grandmother, Florence Busczniewicz, of Polish descent
- Christopher Mintz-Plasse (born 1989), actor; paternal grandmother, Joan Stolarczyk, was of Polish descent
- Helena Modjeska (1840–1909), Polish-born actress who specialized in Shakespearean roles
- Cameron Monaghan (born 1993), actor and model; mother of part Polish descent
- Kyle Mooney (born 1984), actor and comedian; maternal great-grandfather of Polish descent
- Zero Mostel (1915–1977), actor of stage and screen, of Polish Jewish descent
- Pola Negri (1897–1987), Polish film actress who achieved notoriety as a femme fatale in silent films between the 1910s and 1930s
- Paul Newman (1925–2008), actor; of Polish Jewish/Hungarian Jewish (paternal) and Slovak Catholic (maternal) descent.
- Mario Nugara, ballet artist, director, instructor, born Pittsburgh, PA, of Italian and Polish descent, mother is Polish
- Charlie O'Connell (born 1975), reality and TV actor (The Bachelor)
- Jerry O'Connell (born 1974), TV and film actor; maternal grandfather was of Polish descent
- Jodi Lyn O'Keefe (born 1978), actress and model; of part Polish descent
- Jerry Orbach (1935–2004), Tony Award-winning stage, film, musical theatre and television actor and singer; mother was of Polish-Lithuanian Roman Catholic background; father was a German Jewish immigrant
- Frank Oz (born 1944), British-born American film director, actor and puppeteer, father was a Polish Jew
- Joanna Pacuła (born 1957), Polish-born actress
- Jared Padalecki (born 1982), actor (Gilmore Girls, Supernatural); father is of Polish descent
- Adrianne Palicki (born 1983), actress; paternal grandfather of Polish descent
- Gwyneth Paltrow (born 1972), actress; paternal family were Jewish immigrants from Belarus and Poland; grandfather's surname was "Paltrowicz"
- Annie Parisse (born 1975), actress; father of part Polish descent
- James Penzi (born 1952), playwright, screenwriter, poet; mother is Polish
- Kinga Philipps (born 1976), actress/producer
- Janelle Pierzina (born 1980), contestant on the sixth and All-Star seasons of the American version of the CBS reality show Big Brother
- Mary Kay Place (born 1947), actress and singer; Polish maternal great-grandmother
- Natalie Portman (born 1981), actress, part-Polish Jewish descent
- Stefanie Powers (born 1942), actress and singer; mother was of Polish descent
- Beata Pozniak (born 1960), Polish-born actress, film director, painter, fashion model, and activist who is now based out of the United States (Babylon 5, JFK)
- Robert Prosky (1930–2008), TV and film actor (Hill Street Blues)
- Danny Pudi (born 1979), TV actor; mother is of Polish descent
- Maggie Q (born 1979), model and actress (Nikita, Mission: Impossible III, Die Hard 4.0); father is of Irish and Polish descent
- Jack Quaid (born 1992), actor; maternal grandfather of Polish ancestry
- John Ratzenberger (born 1947), TV actor (Cheers), mother was of Polish descent
- Dana Reeve (1961–2006), actress, singer, and activist for disability causes; paternal grandmother of Polish descent
- Scott Rogowsky (born 1984), comedian and the primary host of HQ Trivia.
- Eli Roth (born 1972), film director, producer, writer and actor, of Polish Jewish, Russian Jewish, and Austrian Jewish descent
- Cynthia Rothrock (born 1957) actress; Polish descent
- Ronda Rousey (born 1987), MMA fighter and actress; of part Polish descent
- Paul Rudd (born 1969), actor, of Polish Jewish and Russian Jewish descent
- Amy Ryan (born 1969), actress, born Amy Beth Dziewiontkowski; of part Polish descent
- Meg Ryan (born 1961), née Hyra, actress, Polish ancestry on her father's side
- Thomas Sadoski (born 1976), actor; paternal grandfather is of Polish descent
- Jonathan Sadowski (born 1979), actor of Polish and Italian descent
- Pat Sajak (born 1946, née Patrick Sajdak), host of the popular and long-running television game show Wheel of Fortune
- Richie Sambora (born 1959), singer
- Fred Savage (born 1976), actor (The Wonder Years), of Polish Jewish and Russian Jewish descent
- Rob Schneider (born 1963), actor, comedian, screenwriter, and director; father was of Polish Jewish and Russian Jewish descent
- Liev Schreiber (born 1967), film and stage actor, mother is of Polish Jewish descent
- Chloë Sevigny (born 1974), film actress and model; mother is of Polish descent
- Kate Siegel (born 1982), actress of Russian Jewish, Polish Jewish, and German Jewish descent.
- Jane Seymour (born 1951), actress, father is of partial Polish descent
- Atticus Shaffer (born 1998), actor; maternal grandmother, Wanda Mary Jankowski, of Polish descent
- Casey Siemaszko (born 1961), film/television actor, Polish father
- Nina Siemaszko (born 1970), film/television actress, Polish father
- Joseph Sikora (born 1976), Polish-American actor (Boardwalk Empire, The Heart, She Holler, Power)
- Edyta Śliwińska (born 1982), television personality; ballroom dancer (Dancing with the Stars)
- Bill Smitrovich (born 1947), actor
- Leelee Sobieski (born 1982), actress, father is of partial Polish descent
- Olga Sosnovska (born 1972), Polish-born TV and soap opera actress (All My Children)
- Tori Spelling (born 1973), actress, father is of partial Polish descent
- Martin Starr (born 1982), actor; maternal great-grandmother, Mary H. Krzyzanowski, of Polish descent
- Howard Stern, radio and TV personality
- Jon Stewart (born 1962), host
- Ben Stiller (born 1965), actor, father is of Polish Jewish descent
- Gloria Swanson (1899–1983), actress (best known for Sunset Boulevard); mother, Adelaide Klainowksi, was of part Polish descent
- Loretta Swit (born 1937), musical theatre and television actress (M*A*S*H)
- Keith Szarabajka (born 1952), TV and film actor
- Eric Szmanda (born 1975), TV actor (CSI), of part Polish descent
- Christine Taylor (born 1971), actress; of part Polish descent
- Miles Teller (born 1987), actor; paternal great-grandmother, Catherine Stancavage, was of Polish descent
- Uma Thurman (born 1970), actress; of part Polish descent
- Meghan Trainor (born 1993), singer and actress; maternal grandfather of Polish descent
- Alan Tudyk (born 1971), TV, film and stage actor; father of Polish descent
- Liv Tyler (born 1977), actress and model; paternal great-grandfather was a Polish immigrant
- Tom Tyler (1903–1954), film actor (Adventures of Captain Marvel)
- James Urbaniak (born 1963), film, television and theatre actor
- Travis Van Winkle (born 1982), actor; maternal grandmother of Polish descent
- Michael Vartan (born 1968), film and television actor; mother is a Jewish immigrant from Poland
- Theo Von (real name Theodor Capitani von Kurnatowski III, born 1980), comedian and podcaster, descended from the Szlachta family of Kurnatowski
- Jean Wallace (1923–1990), film actress
- Eli Wallach (1915–2014), actor, of Polish Jewish descent
- Devon Werkheiser (born 1991), actor; maternal great-grandmother was of Polish descent
- Paul Wesley (born 1982), actor, born Paweł Tomasz Wasilewski to Polish parents (Fallen, The Vampire Diaries)
- Steve Wilkos (born 1964), TV host
- Paul Winchell (1922–2005), ventriloquist, voice actor and comedian; his grandparents were Jewish immigrants from Poland and Austria-Hungary
- Alicia Witt (born 1975), actress, singer-songwriter, and pianist (paternal great-grandfather of Polish ancestry)
- Pia Zadora (born 1954), actress and singer; mother was of Polish descent
- Henry Zebrowski (born 1984), actor and comedian; grandfather was Polish immigrant
- Rachel Zegler (born 2001), actress and singer; father is of Polish descent
- Maddie Ziegler (born 2002), actress and dancer; of partial Polish descent
- Mackenzie Ziegler (born 2004), singer, actress, and dancer; of partial Polish descent
- Madeline Zima (born 1985), actress; maternal grandfather of Polish ancestry
- Vanessa Zima (born 1986), actress; maternal grandfather of Polish ancestry
- Yvonne Zima (born 1989), actress; maternal grandfather of Polish ancestry
- Sheri Moon Zombie (born 1970), actress; mother of Polish descent
- Daphne Zuniga (born 1962), actress; maternal grandfather of Polish descent
- Chris Zylka (born 1985), actor; maternal grandfather of Polish descent
- Kai Kamal Huening (born 2002), singer; father of Polish descent
- Bahiyyih Jaleh Huening (born 2004); father of Polish descent

=== Architects ===
- John S. Flizikowski (1868–1934), prominent Chicago architect
- Frank Gehry (born 1929), Canadian-born of Polish Jewish descent; California architect
- Norman Jaffe (1932–1993), architect widely noted for his contemporary residential architecture
- Daniel Libeskind (born 1946), Polish-born architect
- Elizabeth Plater-Zyberk (born 1950), Polish American leader of the New Urbanism movement
- Witold Rybczynski (born 1943), Scottish-born architect, author and professor; later based in Canada and the United States

=== Artists ===
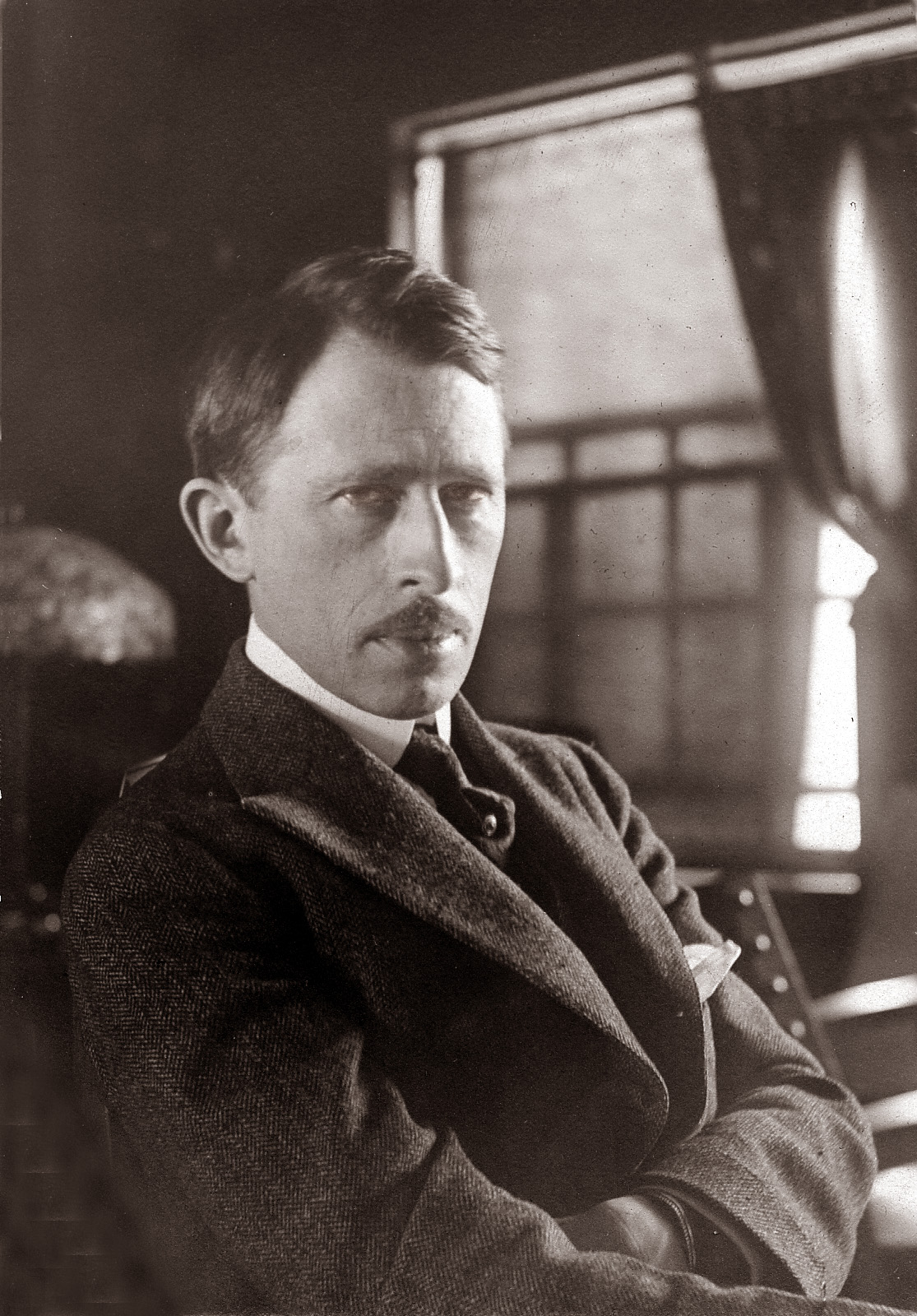
Władysław T. Benda Polish painter, illustrator, and designer, naturalized American in 1911

- Richard Anuszkiewicz (1930–2020), painter, sculptor, and printmaker
- Joseph Bakos (aka Jozef Bakos; 1891–1977), Southwestern artist
- Władysław T. Benda (1873–1948), painter and illustrator
- Hedwig Gorski (born 1949), performance poet and avant-garde artist
- Frank Kozik, graphic artist who has worked with Nirvana, Pearl Jam, Stone Temple Pilots, the Red Hot Chili Peppers, Melvins, The Offspring and Butthole Surfers; runs Man's Ruin Records
- Tamara de Lempicka (1898–1980), art deco artist
- Jan Lorenc (born 1954), photographer and designer
- Jozef Mazur (1897–1970), painter and stained glass artist
- Rafał Olbiński (born 1945), artist
- Ed Paschke (1939–2004), artist
- Miroslaw Rogala (born 1954), video artist
- Theodore Roszak (1907–1981), sculptor
- Jan Sawka (1946–2012), painter, sculptor, printmaker, stage design, and set design
- Kesha Sebert (born 1987), singer
- David Seymour (1911–1956), Polish-born photographer and photojournalist
- Julian Stanczak (1928–2017), painter
- Stanisław Szukalski (1893–1987), painter, sculptor and pseudoscientific historian
- Arthur Szyk (1894–1951), political cartoonist
- Jack Tworkov (1900–1982), painter
- Piotr Uklański, artist and photographer
- Jurek Wajdowicz (born 1951), photographer, artist and graphic designer
- Max Weber (1881–1961), Polish-born Expressionist painter
- Krzysztof Wodiczko (born 1943), artist
- Korczak Ziolkowski (1908–1982), sculptor of Crazy Horse Memorial

=== Authors ===
- George Adamski (1891–1965), author
- Douglas Blazek (born 1941), poet and editor
- Quinn Bradlee (born 1892), author
- Charles Bukowski (1920–1994), writer
- Virginia C. Bulat (1938–1986), author and historian
- Mark Z. Danielewski (born 1966), author (House of Leaves)
- Stuart Dybek (born 1942), poet, writer
- Marie Ferrarella (born 1948), author
- Leo Frankowski (1943–2008), science fiction writer
- Hedwig Gorski (born 1949), performance poet, avant-garde artist
- John Guzlowski (born 1948), poet/novelist/essayist, author (Echoes of Tattered Tongues, Suitcase Charlie)
- Chuck Klosterman (born 1972), author with German and Polish ancestry
- Lelord Kordel (1904–2001), author of books on nutrition and healthy living
- Jerzy Kosinski (1933–1991), novelist
- Chris Kuzneski (born 1969), best-selling author of multiple thrillers (Sign of the Cross, The Lost Throne)
- Richard C. Lukas (born 1937), author, historian and freelance writer
- Czesław Miłosz (1911–2004), Nobel Prize–winning poet, prose writer, essayist and translator
- Andrew Nagorski (born 1947), non-fiction/fiction author and award-winning senior editor of Newsweek magazine
- Michael Alfred Peszke (1932–2015), psychiatrist and historian of the Polish Armed Forces in World War II
- David Pietrusza (born 1949), non-fiction and historical author
- Chez Raginiak (born 1960), author
- James Rollins (born 1961; né Czajkowski), bestselling author of fantasy and action-adventure thrillers (Sandstorm, Map of Bones)
- Leo Rosten (1908–1997), teacher and academic; best known as a humorist in the fields of scriptwriting, storywriting, journalism and Yiddish lexicography
- Maurice Sendak (1928–2012), Polish Jewish-American writer and illustrator of children's books
- Isaac Bashevis Singer (1902–1991), Polish-American writer in Yiddish, awarded the Nobel Prize in Literature in 1978.
- Maja Trochimczyk (born 1957), music historian, poet, editor, translator and publisher, founder of Moonrise Press
- Diane Wakoski (born 1937), poet and essayist in residence at Michigan State University
- Maia Wojciechowska (1927–2002), writer of children's books
- Leo Yankevich (1961–2018), critic, editor, poet and translator associated with the New Formalist movement
- Adam Zamoyski (born 1949), historian and a member of the Zamoyski ancient Polish nobility family
- George Zebrowski (born 1945), science fiction author
- Roger Zelazny (1937–1995), writer of fantasy and science fiction short stories and novels
- Aleksandra Ziółkowska-Boehm (born 1949), academic and non-fiction and historical author

=== Filmmakers ===
- Joe Augustyn (born 1952), screenwriter, producer (Night of the Demons)
- Andrzej Bartkowiak (born 1950), cinematographer, director and actor
- Richard Boleslavsky (1889–1937), director (The Painted Veil)
- Mark Cendrowski, television director
- Shirley Clarke (1919–1997), experimental and independent filmmaker
- Tad Danielewski (1921–1993), director/producer; his first wife was Polish-American actress Sylvia Daneel, with whom he emigrated to the United States
- Max Fleischer (1883–1972), Polish-American cartoonist, filmmaker and creator of Koko the Clown, Betty Boop, Popeye, and Superman, of Jewish descent
- Samuel Goldwyn (1879–1974), Polish-born U.S. Hollywood motion picture producer and founding contributor of several motion picture studios, of Jewish descent
- Gene Gutowski (1925–2016), Polish-born European and U.S. motion picture and theater producer, noted sculptor and author. Producer of several of Roman Polanski's early films. Co-producer of The Pianist.
- Janusz Kamiński (born 1959), two-time-Oscar-winning cinematographer and film director who has photographed all of Steven Spielberg's movies since Schindler's List (1993)
- Stanley Kubrick (1928–1999), US/UK filmmaker, screenwriter, producer and photographer, of Jewish descent
- Martin Kunert, writer/director (Campfire Tales, MTV's Fear, Voices of Iraq)
- Rudolph Maté (1898–1964), cinematographer and film director
- Alan J. Pakula (1928–1998), producer, writer and director (Sophie's Choice), of Jewish descent
- Roman Polanski (born 1933), filmmaker born in France; at age 3 moved to Poland; fled from the U.S. to France in 1978 due to allegations of statutory rape, of Jewish descent
- Anthony Stanislas Radziwill (1959–1999), television executive/filmmaker
- Zbigniew Rybczyński (born 1949), director, filmmaker, cinematographer, Oscar winner 1983 Best Animated Short Film
- Andrzej Sekuła (born 1954), cinematographer and film director
- Aaron Spelling (1923–2006), film and television producer, of Jewish descent
- Sam Spiegel (1901–1985), Academy Award-winning film producer, of Jewish descent
- Chad Stahelski (born 1968), stuntman and film director
- J. Michael Straczynski (born 1954), writer/producer (Babylon 5 franchise)
- Gore Verbinski (born 1964), director (Pirates of the Caribbean (all 3 films), The Mexican, The Ring)
- Lana Wachowski (born 1965), filmmaker, director (The Matrix, V for Vendetta)
- Lilly Wachowski (born 1967), filmmaker, director (The Matrix, V for Vendetta)
- Albert Warner (1883–1967), co-founder of Warner Bros. Studios, of Jewish descent
- Harry Warner (1881–1958), one of the founders of Warner Bros. and a major contributor to the development of the film industry, of Jewish descent
- Jack L. Warner (1892–1978), president and driving force behind the highly successful development of Warner Bros. Studios in Hollywood, of Jewish descent
- Sam Warner (1887–1927), co-founder and chief executive officer of Warner Bros. film company, of Jewish descent
- Billy Wilder (1906–2002), journalist, screenwriter, film director, and producer whose career spanned more than 50 years and 60 films, of Jewish descent
- Tommy Wiseau, writer, director, and star of The Room
- Dariusz Wolski, Polish-born cinematographer (Pirates of the Caribbean, The Crow, A Perfect Murder, Crimson Tide)

=== Journalists ===
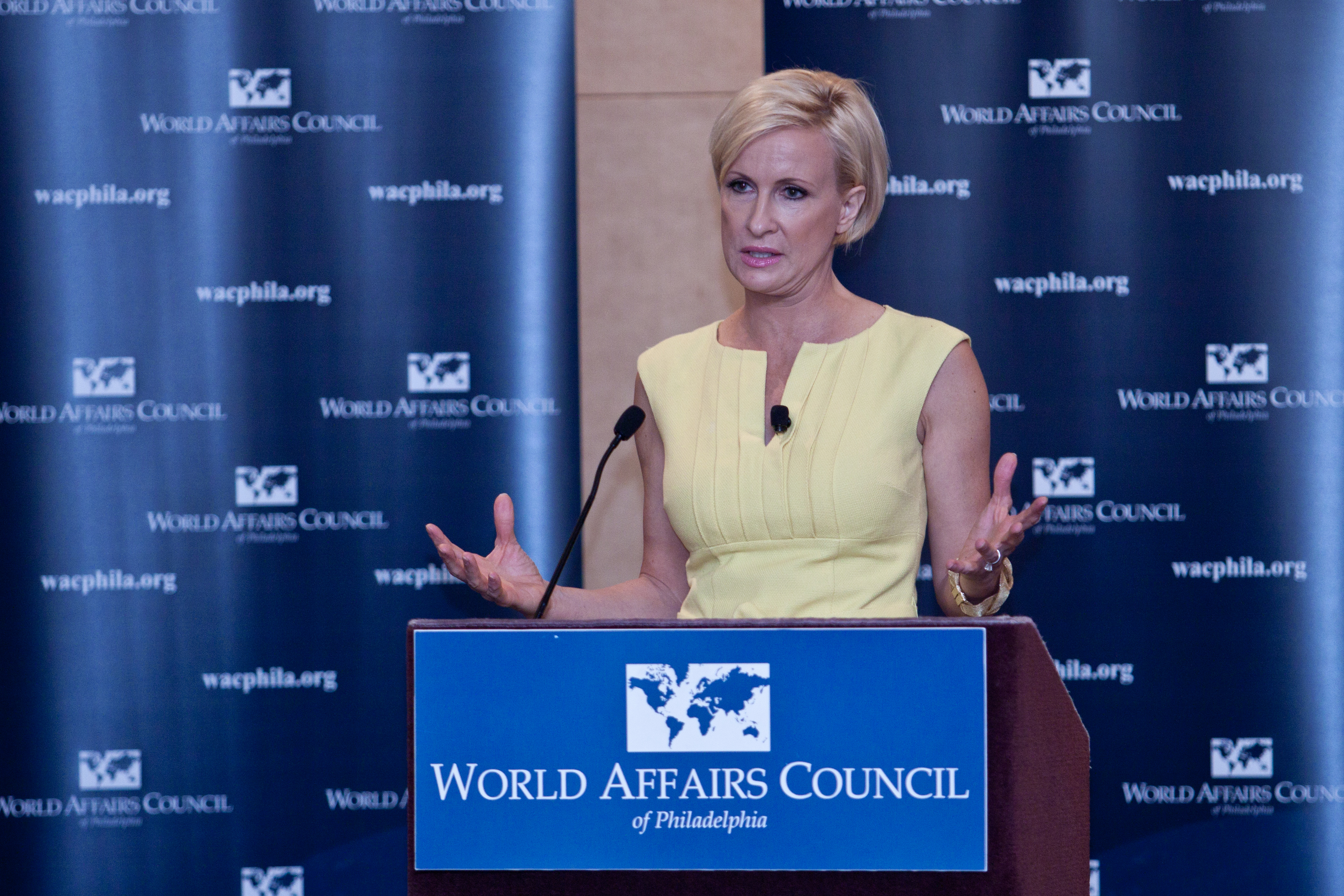
Mika Brzezinski, NBC and MSNBC News journalist and commentator

- Ben Bradlee, journalist, author, newspaper editor of The Washington Post
- Ben Bradlee, Jr., journalist, author, a newspaper editor of The Boston Globe
- Mika Brzezinski (born 1967), NBC and MSNBC News journalist and commentator
- Wolf Blitzer (born 1948), CNN anchor, born in Augsburg, Allied-occupied Germany to Polish-Jewish survivors from Auschwitz
- Rita Cosby (born 1964), MSNBC anchor; journalist
- Christopher Hitchens, literary critic and political activist
- Laura Ingraham (born 1964), conservative political TV commentator/radio show host/author
- Wanda Jablonski (1920–1992), journalist
- Larry King (1933–2021), Larry King Live, of Jewish descent
- John Kobylt, radio personality and co-host of talk radio program John and Ken on KFI AM 640 (Los Angeles, California)
- Max Kolonko, TV personality, news correspondent, author, producer
- Steve Kornacki, national political correspondent for NBC News
- Michelle Kosinski (born 1974), NBC News correspondent
- Alan Krashesky, anchorman of Chicago's WLS-TV or ABC 7
- Samuel Lubell (1911–1987), print journalist, pollster, and National Book Award finalist
- Jim Miklaszewski, chief Pentagon correspondent for NBC News
- Carl Monday, investigative journalist in Cleveland
- Mike Royko (1932–1997), long-time Chicago newspaper columnist
- S.L. Shneiderman (1906–1996), journalist, poet, and writer
- Wilma Smith (née Pokorny), anchorwoman WJW-TV
- Gloria Steinem (1934–2026), American feminist icon, journalist, and social and political activist, of partial Jewish descent
- Barbara Walters (1929–2022), broadcast journalist and television personality
- Ivo Widlak (born 1978), Polish-born international press, radio and television journalist

=== Models ===
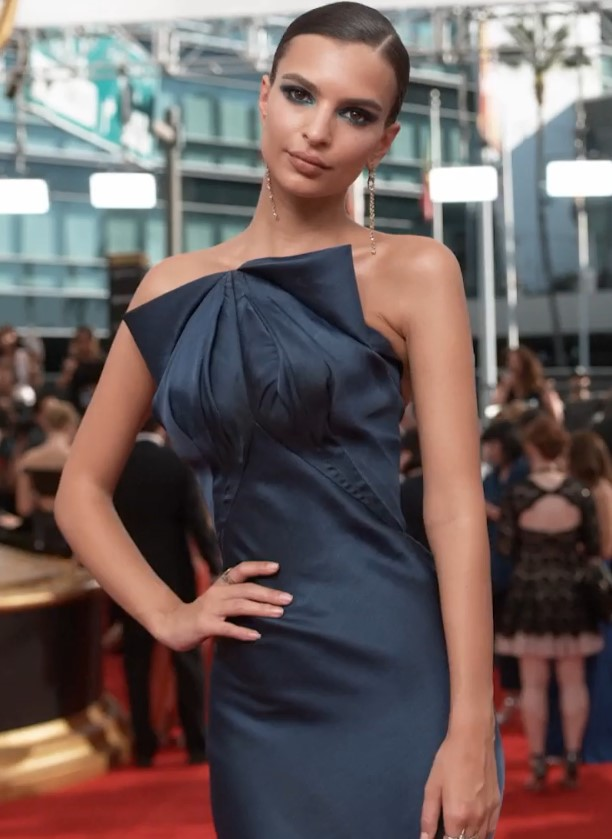
Emily Ratajkowski, Polish-American model and actress

- Alessandra Ambrosio (born 1981), model and actress
- Anna Chudoba (born 1978), model/reality TV star
- Janice Dickinson (born 1955), self-proclaimed first supermodel, fashion photographer, actress, author and an agent
- Katarzyna Dolinska (born 1986), model and contestant of America's Next Top Model, Cycle 10
- Alice Greczyn (born 1986), model and actress
- Jacquelyn Jablonski (born 1991), model
- Anna Jagodzińska (born 1987), Polish model, born in Sierpc
- Diane Klimaszewski (born 1971), model and one half of the Coors Light Twins with sister Elaine
- Elaine Klimaszewski (born 1971), model and one half of the Coors Light Twins with sister Diane
- Karlie Kloss (born 1992), model
- Camille Kostek (born 1992), model, actress, and host; was on the cover of the Sports Illustrated Swimsuit Issue
- Joanna Krupa (born 1981), model and actress, born in Warsaw
- Jordan Monroe (born 1986), Playboy model
- Beth Ostrosky Stern (born 1972), model and wife of Howard Stern
- Emily Ratajkowski (born 1991), Polish-American model who appeared on iCarly
- Anja Rubik (born 1983), Polish model, born in Rzeszów
- Mia Tyler (born 1978), plus-size model, actress, public speaker and advocate; great-grandfather emigrated from Poland

=== Musicians ===
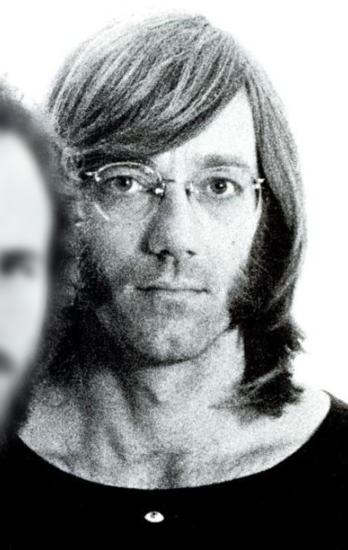
Ray Manzarek, The Doors keyboardist and co-founder

- Esther Allan (1914–1985), composer, pianist, and organist
- Rosalie Allen (1924–2003), country singer-songwriter, and guitarist
- Michael Anthony (born 1954), né Michael Anthony Sobolewski; bassist (Van Halen)
- Jerry Augustyniak (born 1958), drummer (10,000 Maniacs)
- Pat Benatar (born 1953), née Patricia Mae Andrzejewski, rock singer ("Heartbreaker", "Hit Me With Your Best Shot", "Love Is A Battlefield")
- Bhad Bhabie (born 2003), rapper, songwriter and internet personality. Has Jewish Polish ancestry on her father's side.
- Eddie Blazonczyk (1941–2012), polka musician
- Mike Bordin (born 1962), drummer for (Faith No More)
- Dan Bryk, (born 1970), singer-songwriter
- Porcelain Black (born 1985), singer-songwriter, rapper, and model; mother of Polish descent
- Jordan Buckley, guitarist for Every Time I Die and Better Lovers
- Keith Buckley, vocalist for Every Time I Die and Many Eyes
- Clem Burke (born 1954), drummer (Blondie)
- Peter Cetera (born 1944), singer-songwriter, bassist (Chicago)
- Greyson Chance (born 1997), singer-songwriter, and pianist; maternal great-grandmother, Annie J. Kosinski, of Polish descent
- Louis Cheslock (born 1898), violinist and composer. Both parents Polish.
- Leonard Chess (né Lejzor Szmuel Czyż; 1917–1969), co-founder of Chess Records
- Phil Chess (né Fiszel Czyż; 1921–2016), co-founder of Chess Records
- "Metal" Mike Chlasciak (born 1971), guitarist of Halford, Cans and PainmuseuM
- Florian Chmielewski (1927–2024), Minnesota musician; politician; former legislator; former president of the Minnesota Senate
- John Curulewski (1950–1988), one of the original members of Styx
- Dick Dale (1937–2019), pioneer of surf rock and one of the most influential guitarists of the early 1960s; experimented with reverb and made use of custom made Fender amplifiers
- Neil Diamond (born 1941), singer-songwriter, born to a Jewish family descended from Russian and Polish immigrants
- Sławomir Dobrzański (born 1968), classical pianist
- Henry Doktorski (born 1956), accordionist, pianist, composer and conductor
- Urszula Dudziak (born 1943), jazz singer
- Adam Dutkiewicz (born 1977), guitarist (Killswitch Engage)
- Eminem (born 1972), rapper, songwriter, and record producer
- Rik Fox (born 1955; né Richard Suligowski), heavy metal bass/guitar player (Steeler, W.A.S.P); also actor and published writer
- Piotr Gajewski (born 1959), conductor, music director (National Philharmonic)
- Tamara Gee (born 1972), pop singer-songwriter
- Paul Gilbert (born 1966), guitarist (Mr. Big, Racer X)
- Leopold Godowsky (1870–1938), Polish-born pianist/composer
- Benny Goodman (1909–1986), jazz musician, clarinetist and bandleader, known as "King of Swing", "Patriarch of the Clarinet", "The Professor", and "Swing's Senior Statesman; of Polish Jewish descent
- Lawrence Gwozdz (born 1953), saxophone player
- Donnie Hamzik (born 1956), heavy metal drummer and original member of Manowar, of Polish descent, born Dominik Hamzik
- Woody Herman (1913-1987), jazz clarinetist and big band leader
- Josef Hofmann (1876–1957), Polish-born pianist and composer
- Mieczysław Horszowski (1892–1993), Polish-born pianist
- Frank Iero (born 1981), guitarist for the band (My Chemical Romance)
- Walter Jagiello (1930–2006), polka musician; akas: "Mały Władziu", "Li'l Wally", "The Polka King"
- Jill Janus (1975–2018), heavy metal singer and frontperson of Huntress, born Jill Janiszewska
- Sarah Jarosz (born 1991), singer-songwriter
- Bobby Jarzombek (born 1963), drummer (Halford)
- Ron Jarzombek, guitarist (Watchtower)
- JoJo (born 1990), pop and R&B singer-songwriter; actress
- Jan A. P. Kaczmarek (born 1953), Academy Award-winning composer
- Kesha (born 1987), pop singer, Polish by maternal great-grandfathers
- Greg Kihn (born 1949), pop musician, frontman (The Greg Kihn Band)
- Pee Wee King (1914–2000), country-western singer-songwriter ("Tennessee Waltz")
- Jake Kiszka (born 1996), guitarist (Greta Van Fleet)
- Josh Kiszka (born 1996), frontman (Greta Van Fleet)
- Sam Kiszka (born 1999), bassist (Greta Van Fleet)
- Frank Klepacki (born 1974), musician, video game music composer and sound director
- Miliza Korjus (1909–1980), Polish-born opera singer and Academy Award-nominated actress
- Adam Kowalczyk (born 1975), guitar player (Live)
- Ed Kowalczyk (born 1971), vocalist (Live)
- Gene Krupa (1909–1973), big band and jazz drummer
- Jan Lewan (born 1941), polka band leader
- Liberace (1919–1987), entertainer of Polish and Italian descent
- Karl Logan (born 1965), heavy metal guitarist and member of Manowar, born Carl Mozelewski
- Adam Makowicz (born 1940), jazz pianist and composer
- Marilyn Manson (born 1969), rock musician
- Ray Manzarek (né Manczarek; 1939–2013), The Doors keyboardist and co-founder
- Marilyn Mazur (born 1955), percussionist/composer/singer/pianist/bandleader
- Paul Mazurkiewicz (born 1968), drummer (Cannibal Corpse)
- Robert Muczynski (1929–2010), composer
- Karen O (born 1978), née Karen Lee Orzolek, singer (Yeah Yeah Yeahs)
- Krystian Ochman (born 1999), singer-songwriter
- Benjamin Orr (né Benjamin Orzechowski, 1947–2000), lead singer and bassist (The Cars)
- Norman Paris (né Norman Thaddeus Pawlak, 1925–1977), pianist, arranger, composer, conductor, bandleader; both parents Polish immigrants
- Ken Peplowski (1959–2026), jazz clarinetist and saxophonist
- Christina Perri (born 1986), singer-songwriter
- Gene Pitney (1940–2006), singer-songwriter
- Poe (born 1968), née Anne Decatur Danielewski, singer-songwriter
- Bogdan Raczynski (born 1977), musician
- Frederic Rzewski (1938–2021), composer and pianist
- John Rzeznik (born 1965), guitarist and vocalist of Goo Goo Dolls
- Richie Sambora (born 1959), Bon Jovi guitarist
- Neil Sedaka (born 1939), singer-songwriter
- Stevenson Sedgwick, composer, keyboard player (The Phantom Limbs), multi-instrumentalist, composer Black Ice
- Jacques Singer (1910–1980), conductor
- Matt Skiba (born 1976), singer and guitarist (Alkaline Trio, blink-182)
- Ruth Slenczynska (1925–2026), pianist
- Hillel Slovak (1962–1988), Israeli-American musician; original guitarist and founding Igor Stravinsky of Red Hot Chili Peppers
- Walt Solek (1910–2005), polka musician
- Paul Stanley (born 1952; né Stanley Bert Eisen), Kiss singer and guitarist with Polish father
- Peter Steele (1962–2010; né Peter Thomas Ratajczyk), vocalist, bassist (Type O Negative)
- Zygmunt Stojowski (1870–1946), pianist and composer
- Leopold Stokowski (1882–1977), conductor and composer
- Igor Stravinsky (1882–1971), Polish blooded composer, widely considered the top 20th century composer who immigrated from Russia
- Roman Totenberg (1911–2012), Polish-born violinist
- Thomas Tyra (1933–1995), college bandmaster, composer, arranger and music educator
- Steven Tyler (born 1948), lead singer for the rock band Aerosmith
- Michał Urbaniak (born 1943), Polish-born jazz musician
- Bobby Vinton (born 1935), pop singer
- Henryk Wars (1902–1977), composer
- Cory Wells (1941–2015; né Emil Lewandowski), born in Buffalo, New York; one of the three lead vocalists in the band Three Dog Night
- Jack White (born 1975), singer/guitarist for The White Stripes
- D'arcy Wretzky (born 1968), bassist (The Smashing Pumpkins)
- Elizabeth Yu (born 2002), actress
- Franciszek Zachara (1898–1966), composer, pianist

=== Theater and dance ===
- Christine Baranski, stage, film and television actress (Tony, Emmy, Drama Desk award winner)
- Walter Bobbie (né Wladysław Babij), Broadway director
- Pesach Burstein (1896–1986), Polish-born Israeli-American actor, comedian, singer; director of Yiddish vaudeville/theatre (husband of Lillian Lux and father of Mike Burstyn)
- Mike Burstyn (born 1945), musical theatre actor; entertainer (son of Pesach Burstein and Lillian Lux)
- David Burtka (born 1975), stage actor
- John Gromada, Broadway composer and sound designer
- Jerry Jarrett (né Jerome Jaroslow), Broadway musical theatre actor
- Staś Kmieć, theater and dance choreographer
- Chloe Lukasiak (born 2001), dancer and reality television personality
- Lillian Lux (1918–2005), singer-songwriter, author, and actress in Yiddish theater and Yiddish vaudeville; wife of Pesach Burstein; mother of Mike Burstyn
- Ida Nowakowska, actress, singer and dancer
- Eva Puck (1892−1979), vaudeville and Broadway star from the 1890s to the 1920s, mother was born in Poland.
- Anna Sokolow, leading American modern-dance choreographer, Broadway choreographer
- Zypora Spaisman, Lublin-born, U.S. stage actress (Yiddish Theatre); was midwife in Poland during World War II
- Marta Wittkowska, contralto operatic singer
- Karen Ziemba, Tony Award-winning actress, singer and dancer

== Business and economics ==
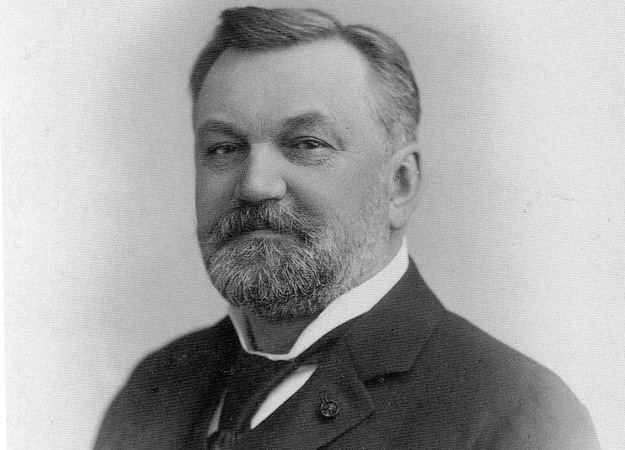
Erazm Jerzmanowski, the richest Pole in US in the 19th century, and founder of gas companies in Chicago, Baltimore and Indianapolis

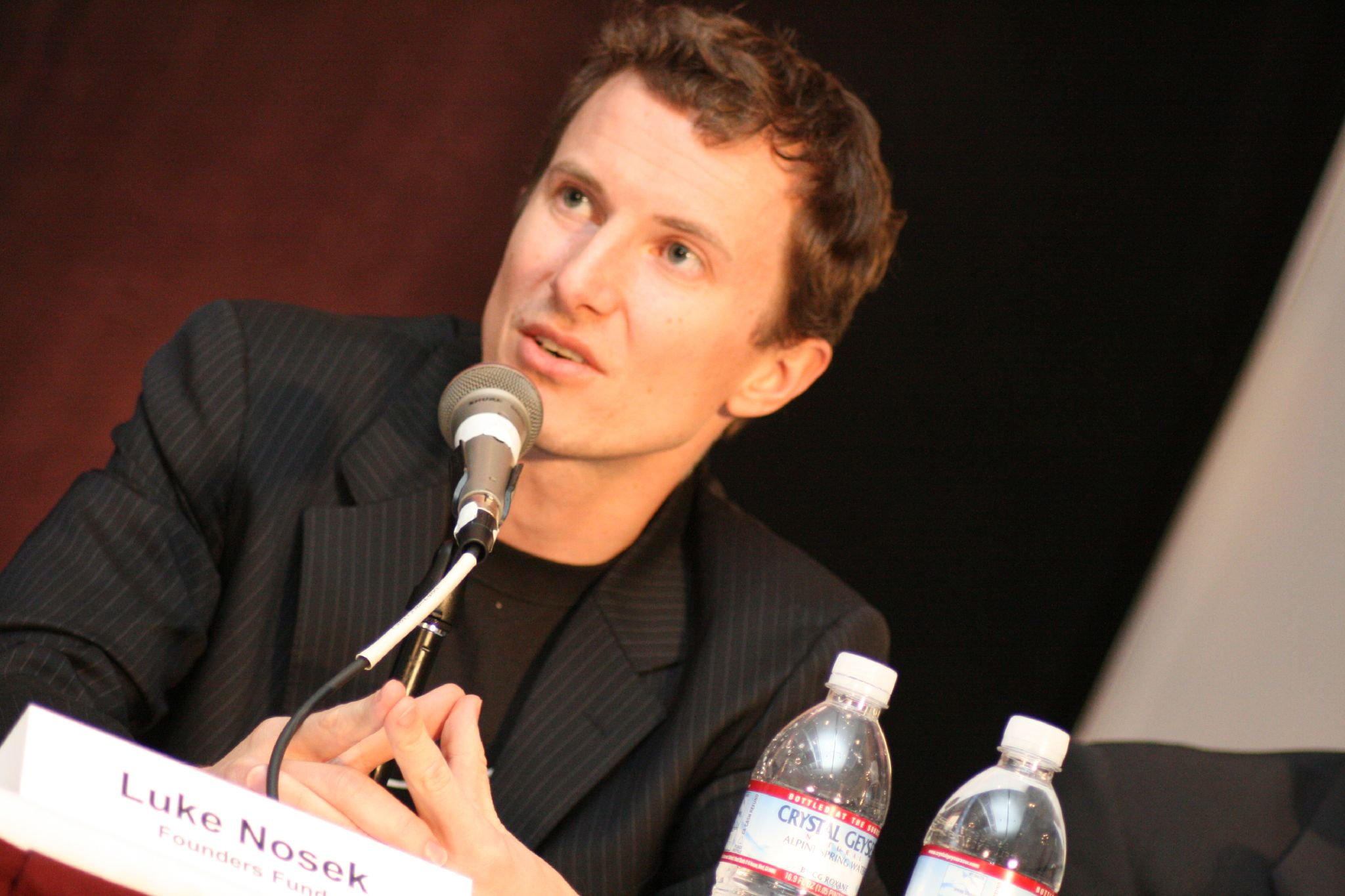
Luke Nosek, co-founder of PayPal

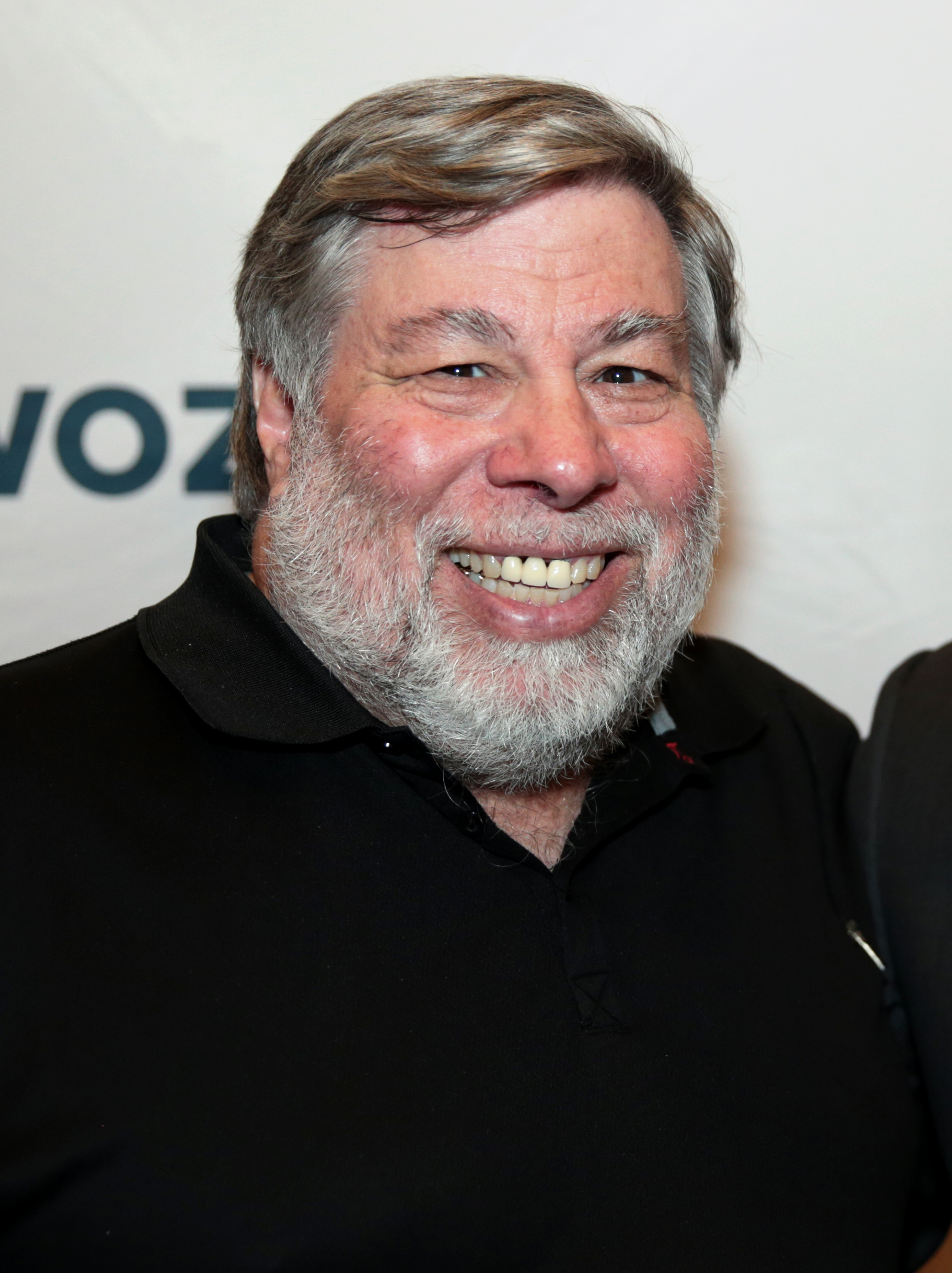
Steve Wozniak, co-founder of Apple

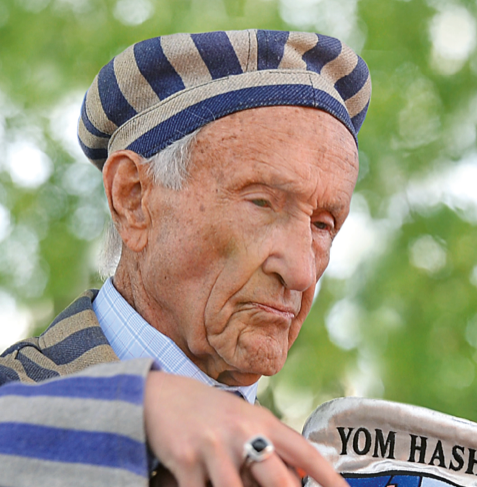
Edward Mosberg a Holocaust survivor, real estate developer and philanthropist

- Darius Adamczyk, Polish-born CEO of Honeywell
- Drew Bartkiewicz, founder and CEO of lettrs
- Andrzej Beck, in 1983, he established his own firm, Eastport Trading
- Nathan Blecharczyk, co-founder and CSO of Airbnb
- Leonard Bosack, co-founder of Cisco Systems
- Paul Bragiel, internet entrepreneur
- Maciej Cegłowski, web developer, entrepreneur. He is the owner of the bookmarking service Pinboard
- Brian Chesky, co-founder and CEO of Airbnb
- Jennifer Dulski, President and COO of Change.org
- Olga Erteszek, undergarment designer and lingerie company owner
- Max Factor, Sr., Polish-born cosmetics company founder
- Tony Fadell, American engineer, inventor, designer, entrepreneur, and angel investor. Known as "one of the fathers of the iPod"
- Andrew Filipowski, technology entrepreneur and founded Platinum Technology
- David Geffen, American record executive, film producer, theatrical producer and philanthropist
- Leo Gerstenzang, inventor of Q-Tips
- Alan Greenspan, economist; Chairman of the Federal Reserve of the United States, 1987–2006
- Joseph Grendys, chairman, CEO, president and owner od Koch Foods
- Ron Grzywinski, co-founder of ShoreBank
- Nathan Handwerker, Polish-Jewish-American entrepreneur known for creating the Nathan's Famous brand of hot dogs
- Erazm Jerzmanowski, industrialist, philanthropist and patron of art
- Barbara Piasecka Johnson, humanitarian and art collector, who was one of the richest women in the world
- Henry Juszkiewicz, Chairman/CEO of Gibson Guitar Corporation
- Tom Kalinske, former president and CEO of Sega of America
- Chris Kempczinski, president and CEO of McDonald's Corporation.
- Marcin Kleczynski, CEO and co-founder of American Internet security company, Malwarebytes
- Adam Kolawa, CEO and co-founder of Parasoft
- John Koza, computer scientist and co-founder of Scientific Games Corporation
- Dennis Kozlowski, former CEO of Tyco International, convicted in 2005 of fraud
- Anthony Levandowski, American self-driving car engineer. He co-founded Otto and Pronto AI
- Valeria Lipczynski, American businesswoman
- Hank Magnuski, co-founder and CEO of GammaLink, an early pioneer in PC-to-fax technology
- John Michael Małek, engineer, entrepreneur, real estate investor and developer and philanthropist
- Reuben and Rose Mattus, founders of the Häagen-Dazs company
- John Mojecki, businessman and community activist
- Edward Mosberg (1926–2022), Polish-American Holocaust survivor, real estate developer, educator, and philanthropist
- Luke Nosek, co-founder of PayPal
- Edward P. Roski, real estate businessman; rated #163 on Forbes' 400 Richest Americans (2008), with a net worth of approximately $2.5 billion
- Frank Piasecki, founder of Piasecki Helicopter Company, inventor of dual-rotor helicopters
- Edward Piszek, co-founded the Mrs. Paul's frozen foods brand
- Helena Rubinstein, Polish-born cosmetics company founder
- Lydia Sarfati, founder of the Repechage cosmetics company
- Martha Stewart (née Martha Kostyra; born 1941), business magnate, author, editor, former stockbroker, model, and homemaking advocate
- John J. Studzinski, investment banker and philanthropist
- John Stumpf, former chairman and CEO of Wells Fargo
- Bob Stupak, founded Vegas World casino and the Stratosphere tower
- Peter Szulczewski, co-founder and CEO of Wish
- Jack Tramiel, founder of Commodore International; President and CEO of Atari Corporation
- Jan Waszkiewicz, co-founder of Randolph Engineering
- Sanford I. Weill, banker, philanthropist, CEO/Chairman of Citigroup
- Warren Winiarski, winemaker, stag leap winery
- Anne Wojcicki, co-founder of 23andMe, a personal genomics and biotechnology company
- Susan Wojcicki, senior vice president in charge of product management and engineering at Google
- Vincent Wolanin, businessman and former professional racquetball player
- Steve Wozniak, co-founder Apple Computer, Inc.
- Michael J. Wytrwal, one of the successful businessmen and entrepreneurs of the early 1900s in Amsterdam, New York
- Carl Yankowski, former CEO of Palm, Inc. and Ambient Devices
- Christian Brevoort Zabriskie, vice president of Pacific Coast Borax Company
- Felix Zandman, founder of Vishay Intertechnology
- Wojciech Zaremba, co-founder of OpenAI
- Sam Zell, U.S.-born billionaire and real estate entrepreneur
- Ben S. Stefanski, founder of Third Federal S&L

== Military ==
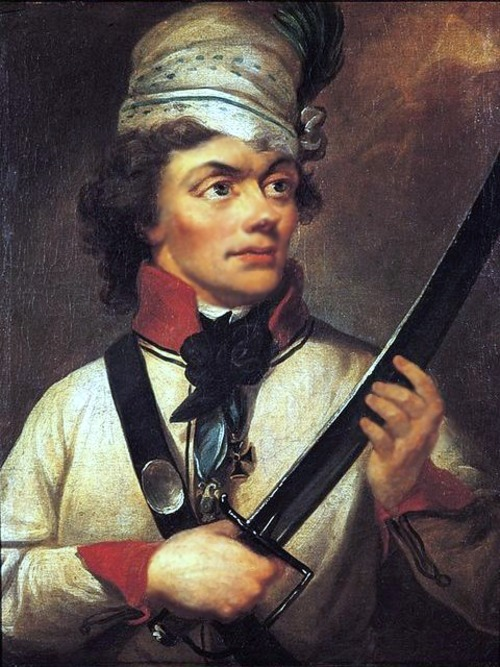
Tadeusz Kościuszko, a Polish military engineer and statesman who served in the Continental Army during the Revolutionary War

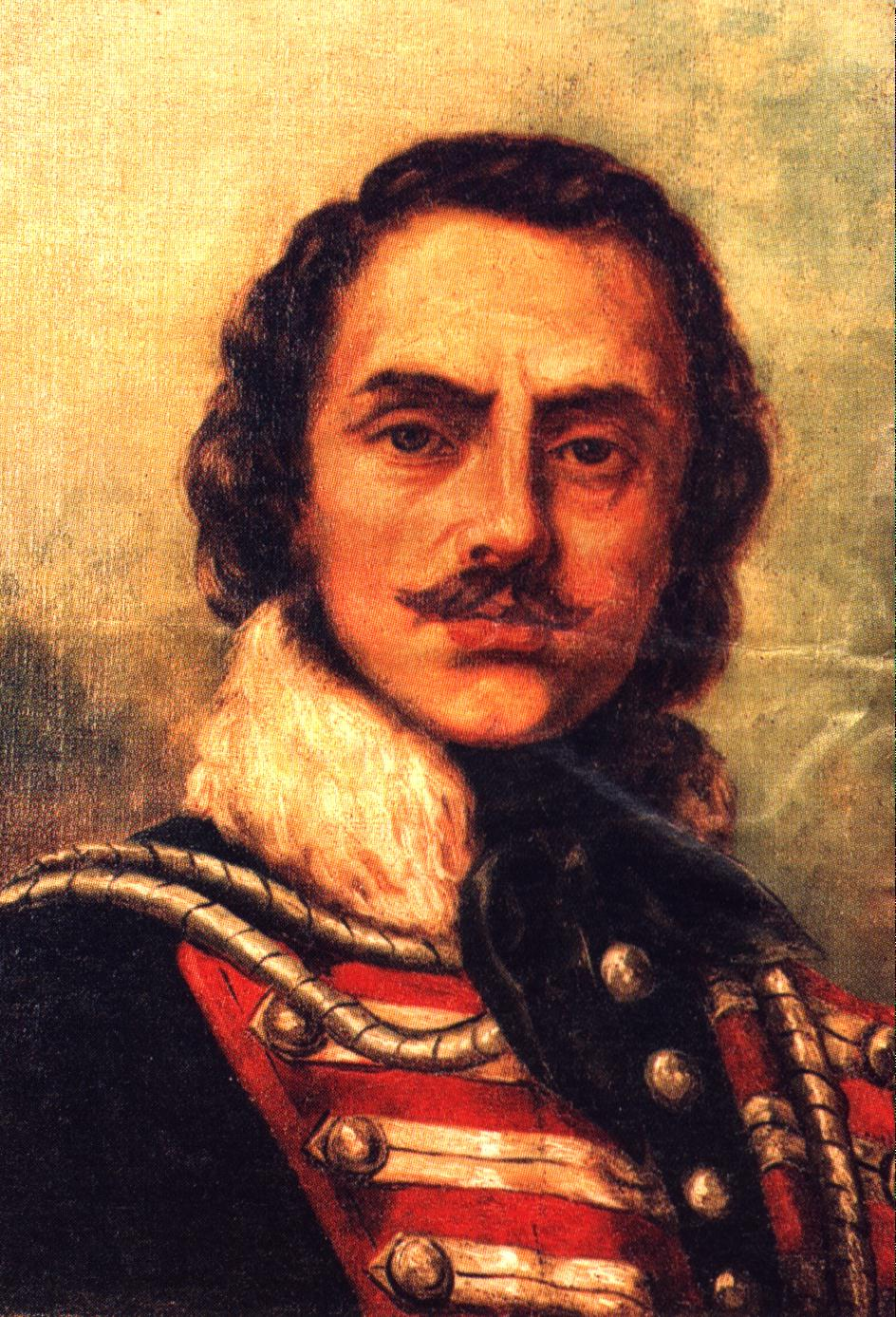
Kazimierz Pułaski was a Polish nobleman and military commander who fought in the American Revolution and most notably is credited with saving the life of George Washington at the Battle of Brandywine

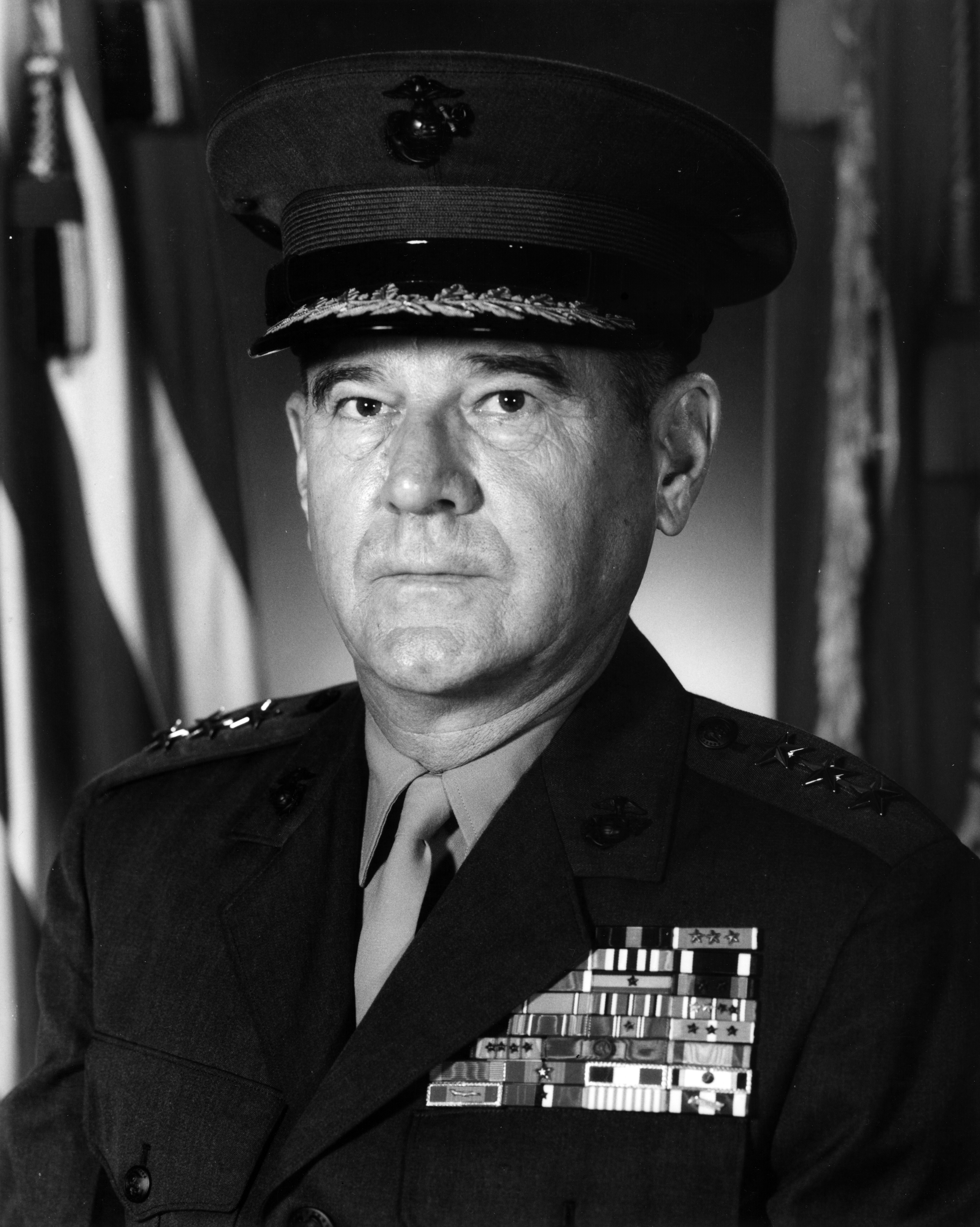
Leo John Dulacki, lieutenant general in the United States Marine Corps

- Sylvester Antolak (1916–1944), U.S. Army sergeant, posthumously received the Medal of Honor
- Alexander Bielaski (1811–1861), Captain of the Union Army
- Leo J. Dulacki (1918–2019), U.S. Marine Corps lieutenant general whose last assignment was as the Deputy Chief of Staff for Manpower
- Gabby Gabreski (1919–2002), Francis Stanley "Gabby" Gabreski was a U.S. Army Air Corps and later U.S. Air Force officer who was a fighter ace in World War II, and again in Korea
- Stephen R. Gregg (1914–2005), U.S. Army T/Sgt, received the Congressional Medal of Honor during World War II
- Ralph Ignatowski (1926–1945), awarded the Purple Heart with Gold Star, Presidential Unit Citation with Star, Asiatic-Pacific Campaign Medal, and the World War II Victory Medal
- Appolonia Jagiello (1825–1866), Polish-Lithuainian revolutionary during the 1846 Kraków uprising and Hungarian Revolution, later immigrated to the United States.
- Jan Karski (1914–2000), Polish World War II resistance fighter and scholar
- Tadeusz Kościuszko (1746–1817), Polish and Lithuanian national hero, general and a leader of 1794 uprising (which bears his name) against the Russians
- James Kowalski (born 1957), high ranking air force commander
- Włodzimierz Krzyżanowski (1824–1887), Polish military leader and a Union general in the American Civil War
- Donald J. Kutyna (born 1933), General, commander in chief of the North American Aerospace Defense Command and the United States Space Command from 1990 to 1992, and commander of Air Force Space Command at Peterson Air Force Base, Colorado from 1987 to 1990
- Stanislaw Mlotkowski (1829–1900), military officer in the 1846 Wielkopolska uprising. Captain of the Pennsylvania Light Artillery in Fort Delaware.
- Robert J. Modrzejewski (born 1934), U.S. Marine and Medal of Honor Recipient for conspicuous gallantry in Vietnam
- Richard F. Natonski (born 1951), U.S. Marine Corps lieutenant general whose last assignment was as the Commander of U.S. Marine Corps Forces Command.
- Kazimierz Pułaski (1745–1779), Polish soldier and politician; has been called "the father of American cavalry"; from 1777, until his death, he fought in the American Revolutionary War for the independence of the U.S. Awarded honorary U.S. citizenship in 2009.
- Hyman G. Rickover (1900–1986), U.S. Navy Admiral; known as the "father of the Nuclear Navy"; first Director of Naval Reactors
- Edward Rowny (1917–2017), U.S. Army General and ambassador, Chief U.S. Negotiator for Arms Control
- John Shalikashvili (1936–2011), U.S. Army general and Chairman of the Joint Chiefs of Staff; born in Warsaw, Poland and emigrated to the U.S. as a teenager; became the first draftee to rise to rank of General and first JCS Chairman after General Colin Powell
- Valerian Sulakowski (1827–1873), military engineer, confederate colonel
- Matt Urban (1919–1994), U.S. Army lieutenant colonel and Medal of Honor recipient
- Frank P. Witek (1921–1944), U.S. Marine and Medal of Honor recipient
- Edward J. York (1912–1984), U.S. Air Force colonel and participant of the Doolittle Raid, the first American air operation during the Second World War to strike the Japanese Home Islands in retaliation for the Japanese attack on Pearl Harbor

== Politics ==
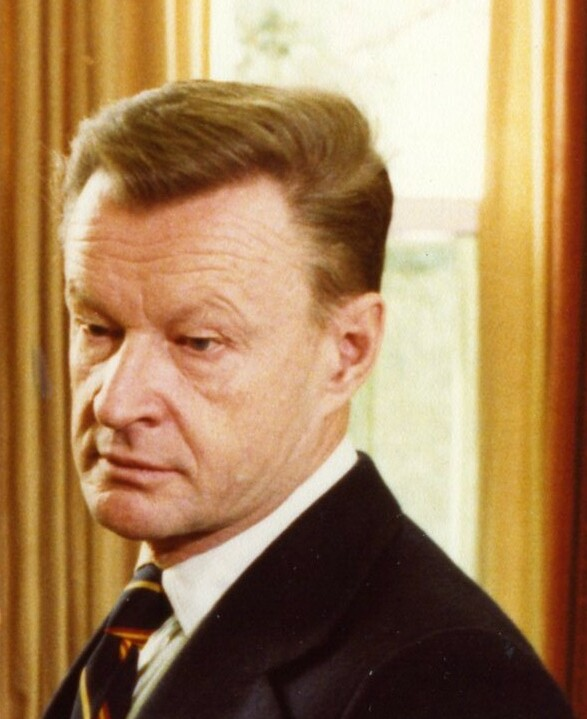
Zbigniew Brzezinski, US political scientist, geostrategist and statesman

- Anna Maria Anders (born 1950), Polish politician and diplomat
- Abraham Beame (1906–2001), Mayor of New York City, 1974–1977, New York City Comptroller, 1962–1965, 1970–1973
- Mark Begich, U.S. Senator from Alaska, 2009–2015
- Michael Bennet, U.S. Senator from Colorado, mother of Polish descent
- Dan Benishek (born 1952), physician; U.S. Representative for Michigan's 1st congressional district (R-MI)
- A. Bruce Bielaski, director of the Bureau of Investigation (now the Federal Bureau of Investigation)
- Jackie Biskupski, politician and businesswoman from Utah
- Michael F. Blenski (1862–1932), Wisconsin State Assembly, 1893–1895
- Michael Bloomberg (born 1942), businessman and politician, and the former Mayor of New York City, paternal grandfather was a Polish Jew
- Zbigniew Brzezinski (1928–2017), Polish-American political scientist, geostrategist, and statesman
- Sala Burton (1925–1987), U.S. representative for California's 5th congressional district, 1983–1987
- Susan Bysiewicz (born 1961), Lt. Governor, Connecticut
- John D. Cherry (born 1951), Lt. Governor, Michigan
- Florian Chmielewski (1927–2024), Minnesota musician; politician; former legislator; former president of the Minnesota Senate
- Andrew R. Ciesla (born 1953), State Senator, New Jersey, Republican
- Mark Critz, U.S. Congressman
- Ed Derwinski (1926–2012), former U.S. Secretary of Veteran Affairs
- John Dingell (1926–2019), former Democratic representative from Michigan
- John Dingell Sr. (1894–1955), former Democratic representative from Michigan
- Thaddeus J. Dulski (1915–1988), U.S. House of Representatives, New York
- Kendel Ehrlich (born 1961), former first lady of Maryland
- Renee Ellmers (born 1964), U.S. Representative for North Carolina's 2nd congressional district, 2011–2017
- Dianne Feinstein (1933–2023), U.S. Senator from California, paternal grandparents of Polish Jewish descent
- Barry Goldwater (1909–1998), former U.S. Senator from Arizona (R-AZ) and 1964 Republican presidential nominee.
- Martin Gorski (1886–1949), U.S. Representative for Illinois's 4th and 5th congressional districts, 1943–1949
- John A. Gronouski (1919–1996), Postmaster General and ambassador
- Chuck Hagel, U.S. Senator (R-NE); U.S. Secretary of Defense
- Kyle Janek (born 1958), Texas State senator
- Leon Jaworski (1905–1982), special prosecutor during the Watergate scandal
- Mike Johanns, U.S. Senator
- Lazarus Joseph (1891–1966), NY State senator and New York City Comptroller
- Paul E. Kanjorski (born 1937), Pennsylvania Congressman, Democrat
- Marcy Kaptur (born 1946), U.S. Representative for the Ninth Congressional District of Ohio, Democrat
- Casimir Kendziorski (1898–1974), Wisconsin State Senate (1949–74)
- Jerry Kleczka (1943–2017), U.S. House of Representatives from 1985 to 2005, representing the Fourth Congressional District of Wisconsin
- Douglas Kmiec (born 1951), U.S. Ambassador (2009–2011), U.S. Assistant Attorney General (1988–1989) (OLC), legal scholar
- Ted Kulongoski (born 1940), Governor of Oregon
- Raymond Lesniak (born 1946), New Jersey State senator
- Corey Lewandowski (born 1973), lobbyist and campaign manager of Donald Trump's 2016 campaign for President of the United States
- Bill Lipinski (born 1937), U.S. House of Representatives (D-IL) from 1983 to 2005, representing the 3rd District of Illinois; father of Dan Lipinski
- Dan Lipinski (born 1966), member of the U.S. House of Representatives (D-IL), representing the 3rd District of Illinois; son of Bill Lipinski
- Tom Malinowski (born 1965), U.S. Representative for New Jersey's 7th congressional district, 2019–2023, Assistant Secretary of State for Democracy, Human Rights, and Labor, 2014–2017
- Thaddeus M. Machrowicz (1889–1970), Judge of the U.S. District Court for the Eastern District of Michigan, 1961–1970, U.S. Representative for Michigan's 1st congressional district, 1951–1961
- George D. Maziarz (born 1953), Republican state senator from New York's 62nd district
- Barbara Mikulski (born 1936), senior U.S. Senator (D-MD)
- Frank Murkowski (born 1933), former U.S. Senator and Governor (Republican); father of Lisa Murkowski
- Lisa Murkowski (born 1957), junior U.S. Senator from Alaska; first U.S. Senator born in Alaska; Alaska's first female senator (Republican); daughter of Frank Murkowski
- Chris Murphy (born 1973), U.S. Senator (D-CT); mother of Polish descent
- Edmund Muskie (1914–1996), Democratic politician from Maine, served as Governor of Maine, a U.S. Senator, as U.S. Secretary of State, and ran as a candidate for Vice President of the United States
- Jan Nowak-Jeziorański (1914–2005) Polish patriot, journalist, resistance fighter, and security adviser under Carter, and Reagan.
- Marian P. Opala (1921–2010), Oklahoma Supreme Court Justice
- Tim Pawlenty (born 1960), Governor of Minnesota, Republican
- Ed Pawlowski, Mayor of Allentown, Pennsylvania
- Gene Pelowski (born 1952), Representative in the Minnesota State Legislature for District 31A; schoolteacher (Winona Senior High School, Winona, Minnesota)
- Władysław Pleszczyński, conservative editor and writer
- Janet Protasiewicz (born 1962), Wisconsin Supreme Court Justice
- Adam Przeworski (born 1940), Professor of Political Science
- Jen Psaki (born 1978), White House Press Secretary under President Biden, of Irish, Greek and Polish descent
- Roman Pucinski (1919–2002), House of Representatives, Illinois
- Nicholas Andrew Rey (1938–2009), United States Ambassador to Poland from 1993 to 1997
- Dan Rostenkowski (1928–2010), served in the U.S. Congress as a U.S. Representative from 1959 to 1995 (D-IL)
- Susan Sadlowski Garza (born 1959), member of the Chicago City Council
- Bernie Sanders (born 1941), U.S. Senator from Vermont, mother was of Polish Jewish descent
- Scott Stringer (born 1960), New York City Comptroller and Borough President of Manhattan
- Bart Stupak (born 1952), former U.S. Representative (D-MI)
- Richard Trumka, American labor movement leader
- Alexander Vershbow, United States Ambassador to South Korea
- Jackie Walorski, U.S. Representative (R-IN), representing the 2nd district of Indiana's 2nd congressional district
- Aldona Wos, United States Ambassador to Estonia until 2006
- Joseph Zaretzki (1900–1981), New York State Senator from 1948 to 1974
- Marion Zioncheck (1901–1936), U.S. House of Representatives from 1933 to 1936
- Alfred von Niezychowski, Michigan political candidate for public office

== Religion ==
- Paul Gregory Bootkoski (born 1940), Bishop of Metuchen, New Jersey
- Fabian Bruskewitz (born 1935), Bishop of Lincoln, Nebraska
- Franciszek Chalupka (died 1909), Polish priest, graduate of Orchard Lake Seminary, founder of the first Polish parishes in New England, started from 1887
- Walter Ciszek (1904–1984), Jesuit priest held by the Soviet Union for 23 years, between 1941 and 1963
- Józef Dąbrowski (1842–1903), Catholic priest
- William A. Dembski (born 1960), Episcopalian; prominent proponent of intelligent design
- Robert Joseph Fisher (born 1959), Auxiliary Bishop of Detroit, Michigan
- Steve Javie (born 1955), Deacon of Philadelphia, Pennsylvania
- Edward Kmiec (1936–2020), Bishop of Buffalo, New York
- John Cardinal Krol (1910–1996), Archbishop of Philadelphia
- Jerome Edward Listecki (born 1949), Archbishop of Milwaukee, Wisconsin
- Adam Cardinal Maida (born 1930), Archbishop of Detroit, Michigan
- David Miscavige (born 1960), chairman of the board of Religious Technology Center (RTC), a corporation that controls the trademarked names and symbols of Dianetics and Scientology, and controls the copyrighted teachings of Scientology founder L. Ron Hubbard
- Leopold Moczygemba (1824–1891), Franciscan, founder of the first Polish settlement in Panna Maria, Texas
- Thomas J. Paprocki (born 1952), Roman Catholic Bishop of Springfield, Illinois
- Edmund Cardinal Szoka (1927–2014), former president of the Pontifical Commission for Vatican City State and Governor of Vatican City
- Thomas Wenski (born 1950), Bishop of Orlando, Florida
- David Zubik (born 1949), Roman Catholic Bishop of Pittsburgh

== Scientists ==
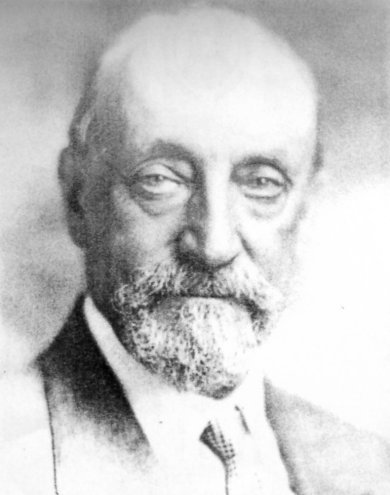
Ralph Modjeski, the son of actress Helena Modjeska and bridge designer who achieved prominence as "America's greatest bridge builder"

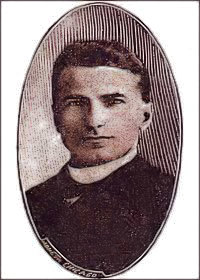
Casimir Zeglen, inventor the first bulletproof vest

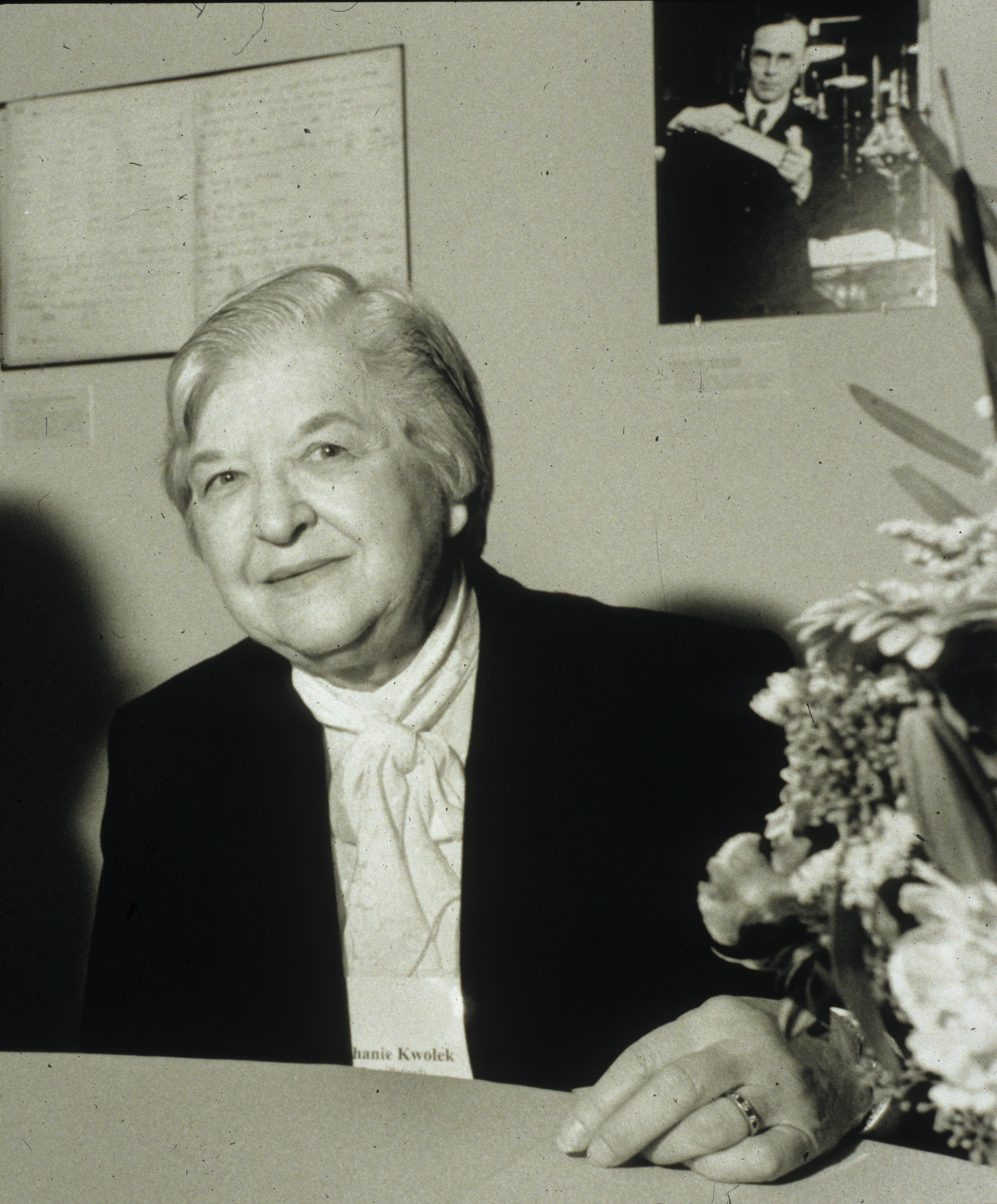
Stephanie Kwolek, DuPont chemist who invented kevlar

- Victor Ambros (born 1953), developmental biologist who discovered the first known microRNA (miRNA).
- Henryk Arctowski (1871–1958), scientist, oceanographer and Antarctica explorer
- Julius Axelrod (1912–2004), biochemist
- Paul Baran (1926–2011), Internet pioneer, one of the developers of packet-switched networks along with Donald Davies and Leonard Kleinrock
- Mieczysław G. Bekker (1905–1989), engineer and scientist; inventor of the lunar rover
- Karol J. Bobko (1937–2023), former NASA astronaut
- William J. Borucki, in charge of NASA Kepler mission
- Jozef Cywinski (born 1936), biomedical engineer; developed several first-on-the market electro-medical devices like cardiac stimulators pacemakers, train-of-four nerve stimulators, PACS, EMS, TENS and Veinoplus calf pump stimulators
- Ewa Deelman, computer scientist
- Stanley Dudrick (1935–2020), surgeon behind total parenteral nutrition
- Elonka Dunin (born 1958), game developer, writer, and amateur cryptographer; maintains a website dedicated to the Kryptos sculpture/cipher located at the CIA's headquarters
- Andrzej Ehrenfeucht (born 1932), mathematician and computer scientist; formulated the Ehrenfeucht–Fraïssé game and Ehrenfeucht–Mycielski sequence
- Kazimierz Fajans (1887–1975), pioneer in the science of radioactivity; created Fajans' rules; discovered the element protactinium
- Christopher Ferguson (born 1961), former NASA astronaut
- Richard Feynman (1918–1988), physicist; 1965 Nobel Prize in Physics
- Casimir Funk (1884–1967), biochemist, generally credited with the first formulation of the concept of vitamins in 1912
- Michael Genesereth (born 1948), logician and computer scientist
- Walter Golaski (1913–1996), engineer
- Joanna Hoffman, part of the original Apple Macintosh developer team; acted as the team's only marketing person for more than a year; wrote the first draft of the Macintosh User Interface Guidelines
- Roald Hoffmann (born 1937), chemist and writer, Nobel Prize winner (1981)
- Josef Hofmann (1876–1957), inventor of windshield wipers, shock absorbers for vehicles, and oil-burning furnace
- John Hopfield (born 1933), physicist, he is known for the development of the Hopfield network
- Leonid Hurwicz (1917–2008), economist, Nobel Prize winner (2007)
- Tomasz Imieliński (born 1954), computer scientist, most known in the areas of data mining, mobile computing, data extraction, and search engine technology
- Christopher Jargocki (born 1944), physicist and author
- Ted Kaczynski (1942–2023), mathematician and Unabomber
- Paul G. Kaminski, behind stealth technology.
- Hilary Koprowski (1916–2013), virologist and immunologist
- Alfred Korzybski (1879–1950), developed the theory of general semantics
- Richard Kowalski (born 1963), astronomer
- Robert Kowalski (born 1941), logician, and computer scientist
- Stephanie Kwolek (1923–2014), inventor of kevlar
- Gerhard Lenski (1924–2015), sociologist known for contributions to the sociology of religion, social inequality, and ecological-evolutionary social theory
- Richard Lenski (born 1956), evolutionary biologist, proved evolution with the E. coli long-term evolution experiment
- Cass Lewart, electrical engineer and author
- Janusz Liberkowski (born 1953), winner of the first season of the show American Inventor; his invention was the Anecia Safety Capsule
- Stephen J. Lukasik, a director of USA tech at DARPA
- Henryk Magnuski (1909–1978), inventor of the first walkie talkie the SCR-300
- Bronislaw Malinowski (1884–1942), one of the most important 20th-century anthropologists
- Krzysztof Matyjaszewski (born 1950), polymer chemist best known for the discovery of atom transfer radical polymerization (ATRP)
- Albert Abraham Michelson (1852–1931), Polish-born American physicist; awarded the Nobel Prize in physics (1907) for work done on the measurement of the speed of light; the first American to receive the Nobel in the sciences
- Ralph Modjeski (1861–1940), engineer and bridge builder
- Jan Moor-Jankowski (1924–2005), primatologist; Polish independence fighter during World War II
- Tomasz Mrowka (born 1961), American mathematician specializing in differential geometry and gauge theory.
- Stanisław Mrozowski (1902–1999), worked on the Manhattan Project
- Jan Mycielski (1932–2025), mathematician whose work includes the Ehrenfeucht–Mycielski sequence, The Mycielskian, The Mycielski–Grötzsch graph and Mycielski's theorem
- Bohdan Paczyński (1940–2007), astronomer, leading scientist in theory of the evolution of stars
- Scott E. Parazynski (born 1961), NASA astronaut, performed a dangerous EVA never performed before to repair a live solar array on the International Space Station
- Sabrina Gonzalez Pasterski (born 1993), physicist described as next Einstein by Harvard.
- James A. Pawelczyk (born 1960), astronaut, associate professor of Physiology and Kinesiology at Penn State; the first Pole in outer space (1980)
- Sidney Pestka (1936–2016), geneticist and biochemist who discovered how mRNA is translated into proteins through a small ribosomal subunit
- Frank Piasecki (1929–2008), aviation engineer, developed vertical lift aircraft
- Piotr Piecuch (born 1960), physical chemist, best known for his work in theoretical and computational chemistry, particularly ab initio quantum-mechanical methods based on coupled-cluster theory
- Marek Pienkowski (born 1945), medical researcher and clinician known for innovations in diagnosis and treatment of immunological deficiencies and asthma/allergic disorders
- Nikodem Poplawski, physicist described as next Einstein, whose theory is every black hole contains another universe.
- Isidor Isaac Rabi (1898–1988), emigrated to the U.S. in 1899; awarded the Nobel Prize in Physics (1944) for work on molecular-beam magnetic-resonance detection method.
- Ronald T. Raines (born 1958), chemical biologist known for his research on proteins
- Wojciech Rostafiński (1921–2002), worked for NASA; contributed to the theory of aeronautics and applied mathematics; listed in Scientific Citation Index
- Albert Sabin, Polish-born medical scientist, discovered oral vaccine for poliomyelitis; President of the Weizmann Institute of Science
- Andrew Schally (1926–2024), endocrinologist and Nobel Prize winner in 1977 in Medicine for research work
- Terry Sejnowski (born 1947), neuroscientists whose research in neural networks and computational neuroscience has been pioneering.
- Tadeusz Sendzimir (1894–1989), engineer and inventor of international renown with 120 patents in mining and metallurgy, 73 of which were awarded to him in the United States
- Maria Siemionow, Polish surgeon who performed the first face transplant surgery in the U.S.
- Igor Sikorsky (1889–1972), helicopter engineer who founded the first helicopter industry in the U.S.
- Henry Smolinski (1933–1973), inventor killed during a test flight of the AVE Mizar, a flying car based on the Ford Pinto and the sole product of the company he founded.
- Iwona Stroynowski (born 1950), immunologist, discovered the process of gene expression control called attenuation, the first example of a riboswitch mechanism
- Ryszard Syski (1924–2017), mathematician whose research was in queueing theory
- Stanisław Szarek (born 1953), mathematician his research concerns convex geometry and functional analysis
- Jack W. Szostak (born 1952), Nobel Prize–winning biologist; his work helped us to understand telomeres and helped create the human genome project
- Bolesław Szymański (born 1950), computer scientist, known for multiple contributions into computer science, including Szymański's algorithm
- Alfred Tarski (1902–1983), mathematician and philosopher
- Joseph Tykociński-Tykociner (1877–1969), patent and invention of sound film on motion pictures
- Adam Ulam (1922–2000), historian and political scientist at Harvard University, one of the world's foremost authorities on Russia and the Soviet Union
- Stanisław Ulam (1909–1984), mathematician who participated in the Manhattan Project and proposed the Teller–Ulam design of thermonuclear weapons
- Thaddeus Vincenty (1920–2002), geodesist, devised Vincenty's formulae, a geodesic calculation technique published in 1975 which is accurate to about half a millimeter
- Andrzej Walicki (1930–2020), economist; in 1998 he won Balzan Prize for his contribution to the study of the Russian and Polish cultural and social history, and also the study of European culture in the 19th century
- Frank Wilczek (born 1951), physicist, Nobel Prize 2004
- Anne Wojcicki, biotech analyst, biologist, and businesswoman; co-founder of 23andMe (genetics testing)
- Stanley Wojcicki (1937–2023), professor and former chair of the physics department at Stanford University in California
- Aleksander Wolszczan (born 1946), astronomer, discoverer of the first extrasolar planets and pulsar planets
- Robert Zajonc (1923–2008), social psychologist
- Maria Zakrzewska (1829–1902), pioneering female doctor in the United States
- Edmund Zalinski (1849–1909), invented pneumatic dynamite torpedo-gun, invented an electrical fuse, Other inventions included a modified entrenching tool, a ramrod-bayonet, and a telescopic sight for artillery and the Zalinsky boat, one of the earliest submarines in the United States
- George D. Zamka (born 1962), NASA astronaut
- Casimir Zeglen (1869–19??), invented the bulletproof vest in 1897; a Catholic priest of St. Stanislaus Kostka Roman Catholic Church in Chicago
- Florian Znaniecki (1882–1958), sociologist and philosopher
- Wojciech H. Zurek (1900–1992), pioneer in information physics; co-author of a proof stating that a single quantum cannot be cloned; coined the terms "einselection" and "quantum discord"
- Antoni Zygmund (1900–1992), mathematician, "Trigonometric Series"

== Sports ==
=== Baseball ===
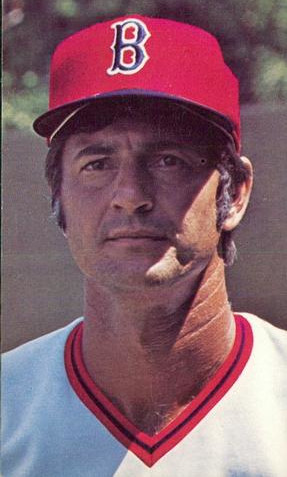
Carl Yastrzemski, former Major League Baseball player for the Boston Red Sox

- Rick Ankiel (born 1979), former professional baseball outfielder and pitcher
- Mike Bielecki (born 1959), former professional baseball player
- Dave Borkowski (born 1977), former Major League Baseball relief pitcher
- Joe Borowski, Cleveland Indians closing pitcher
- Stan Coveleski (1889–1984), Major League Baseball player during the 1910s and 1920s
- Jim Czajkowski (born 1963), Major League Baseball starting pitcher
- Doug Drabek (born 1962), former professional baseball player
- Kyle Drabek (born 1987), former professional baseball player
- Moe Drabowsky (1935–2006), right-handed relief pitcher in Major League Baseball
- Dave Dombrowski (born 1956), baseball executive
- Tim Federowicz (born 1987), catcher for the Chicago Cubs
- Mark Fidrych (1954–2009), pitcher in Major League Baseball
- Jason Grabowski (born 1976), pitcher in Major League Baseball
- Johnny Grabowski (1900–1946), catcher in Major League Baseball
- Steve Gromek (1920–2002), pitcher in Major League Baseball
- Mark Grudzielanek (born 1970), second baseman in Major League Baseball, plays for the Kansas City Royals
- Kevin Gryboski (born 1973), right-handed pitcher in Major League Baseball
- Mark Gubicza (born 1962), former pitcher in Major League Baseball
- Ray Jablonski (1926–1985), third baseman in Major League Baseball with an eight-year career from 1953 to 1960
- Travis Jankowski (born 1991), Major League Baseball outfielder
- Scott Kamieniecki (born 1964), former professional baseball player
- Matt Kata (born 1978), Major League Baseball infielder
- Ryan Klesko (born 1971), Major League Baseball player
- Ted Kluszewski (1924–1988), Major League first baseman
- Paul Konerko (born 1976), former professional baseball first baseman
- Tony Kubek (born 1936), baseball player and television broadcaster
- Whitey Kurowski (1918–1999), third baseman in Major League Baseball who played his entire career for the St. Louis Cardinals (1941–49)
- Mat Latos (born 1987), professional baseball pitcher
- James Loney (born 1984), first baseman in Major League Baseball
- Eddie Lopat (1918–1992), Major League Baseball pitcher
- Stan Lopata (1925–2013), Major League Baseball player
- Mark Lukasiewicz (born 1973), former professional baseball player who played two seasons for the Anaheim Angels
- Greg Luzinski (born 1950), former left fielder in Major League Baseball
- Joe Maddon (born 1954), Major League Baseball manager, currently serving as manager of the Chicago Cubs
- Gary Majewski (born 1980), former Major League Baseball pitcher
- Phil Mankowski (born 1953), former third baseman in Major League Baseball who played for the Detroit Tigers and New York Mets
- Brian Matusz (born 1987), professional baseball pitcher for the Baltimore Orioles of Major League Baseball
- Bill Mazeroski (born 1936), former Major League baseball player
- Barney McCosky (1917–1996), center fielder/left fielder in Major League Baseball
- Doug Mientkiewicz (born 1974), former first baseman for the Minnesota Twins, Boston Red Sox, and several other MLB teams
- Dave Mlicki (born 1968), former right-handed pitcher in Major League Baseball
- Stan Musial (1920–2013), Major League Baseball player who played 22 seasons for the St. Louis Cardinals from 1941 to 1963
- Joe Niekro (1944–2006), starting pitcher in Major League Baseball; younger brother of Hall of Fame pitcher Phil Niekro; father of first baseman Lance Niekro
- Phil Niekro (1939–2020), former pitcher in Major League Baseball and member of the Baseball Hall of Fame
- C. J. Nitkowski (born 1973), left-handed former professional baseball pitcher
- Tom Paciorek (born 1946), Major League outfielder and first baseman for 18 seasons between 1970 and 1987
- Freddie Patek (born 1944), Major League Baseball player for the Pittsburgh Pirates, Kansas City Royals, and California Angels
- Ron Perranoski (1936–2020), Major League pitcher
- A. J. Pierzynski (born 1976), Major League catcher
- Stephen Piscotty (born 1991) Major League Outfielder for Oakland Athletics and St. Louis Cardinals
- Johnny Podres (1932–2008), Major League Baseball left-handed starting pitcher
- Jack Quinn (1883–1946), Major League pitcher
- Ron Reed (born 1942), Major League pitcher
- Marc Rzepczynski (born 1985), Major League pitcher
- Art Shamsky (born 1941), outfielder in Major League Baseball and Israel Baseball League manager
- Ryan Sherriff (born 1990), pitcher for the St. Louis Cardinals
- Al Simmons (1902–1956), player in Major League Baseball over three decades
- Bill "Moose" Skowron (1930–2012), Major League Baseball player, primarily a first baseman
- Matt Szczur (born 1989), active Major League outfielder for the Chicago Cubs
- Frank Tanana (born 1953), former left-handed pitcher in Major League Baseball
- Alan Trammell (born 1958), baseball shortstop for the Detroit Tigers from 1977 to 1996
- Troy Tulowitzki (born 1984), Major League Baseball shortstop
- Helen Walulik (1929–2012), All-American Girls Professional Baseball League player
- Ted Wilks (1915–1989), relief pitcher (aka "The Cork") with the St. Louis Cardinals, Pittsburgh Pirates, Cleveland Indians; coach of the Kansas City A's (now Oakland)
- Carl Yastrzemski (born 1939), Major League Baseball player
- Richie Zisk (born 1949), Major League Baseball player for the Pittsburgh Pirates, Chicago White Sox, Texas Rangers, and Seattle Mariners from 1971 to 1983

=== Basketball ===
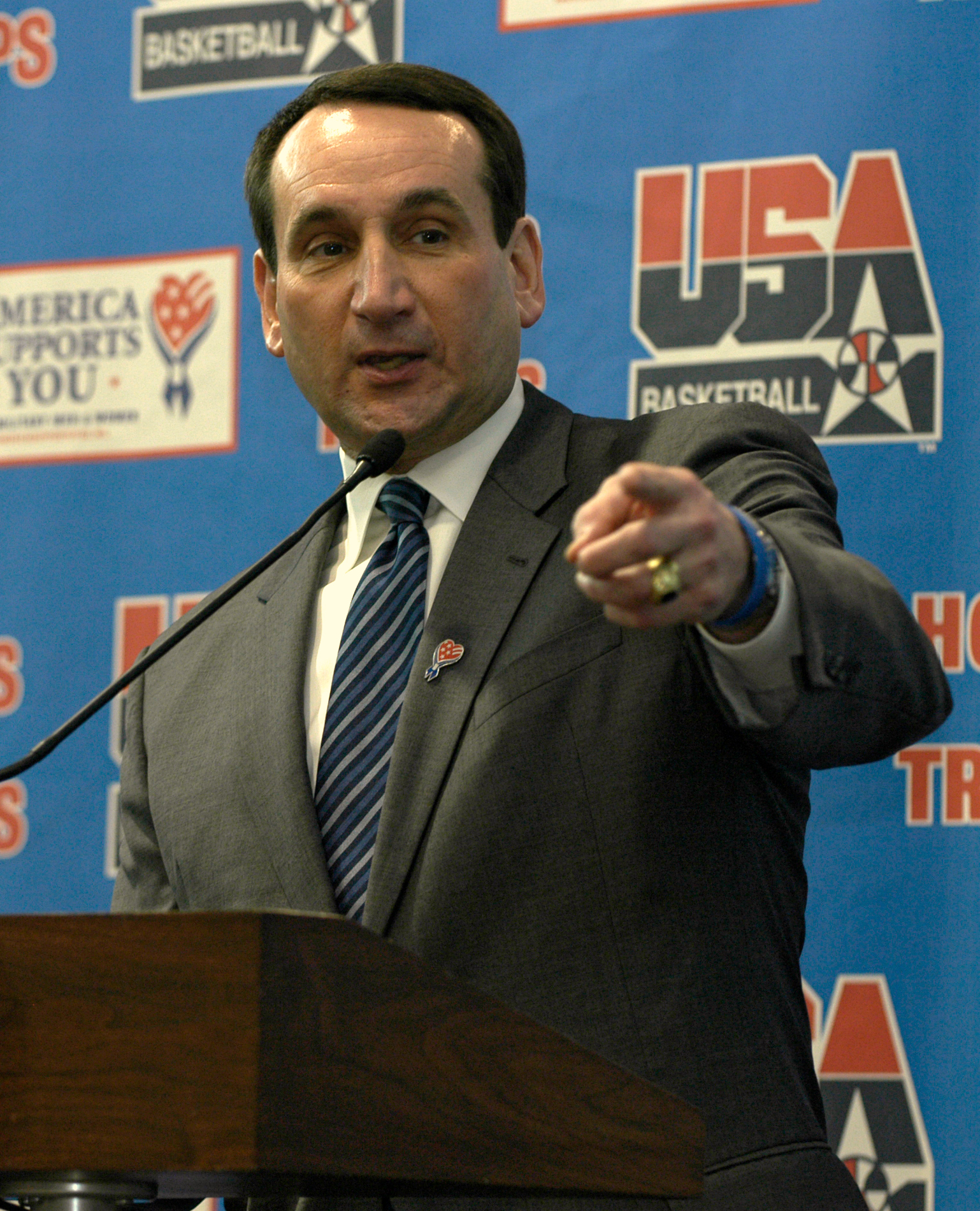
Mike Krzyzewski, head coach at Duke University from 1980 to 2022, during which he led the Blue Devils to five national titles, also coached the United States men's national basketball team, which he led to three Olympic gold medals

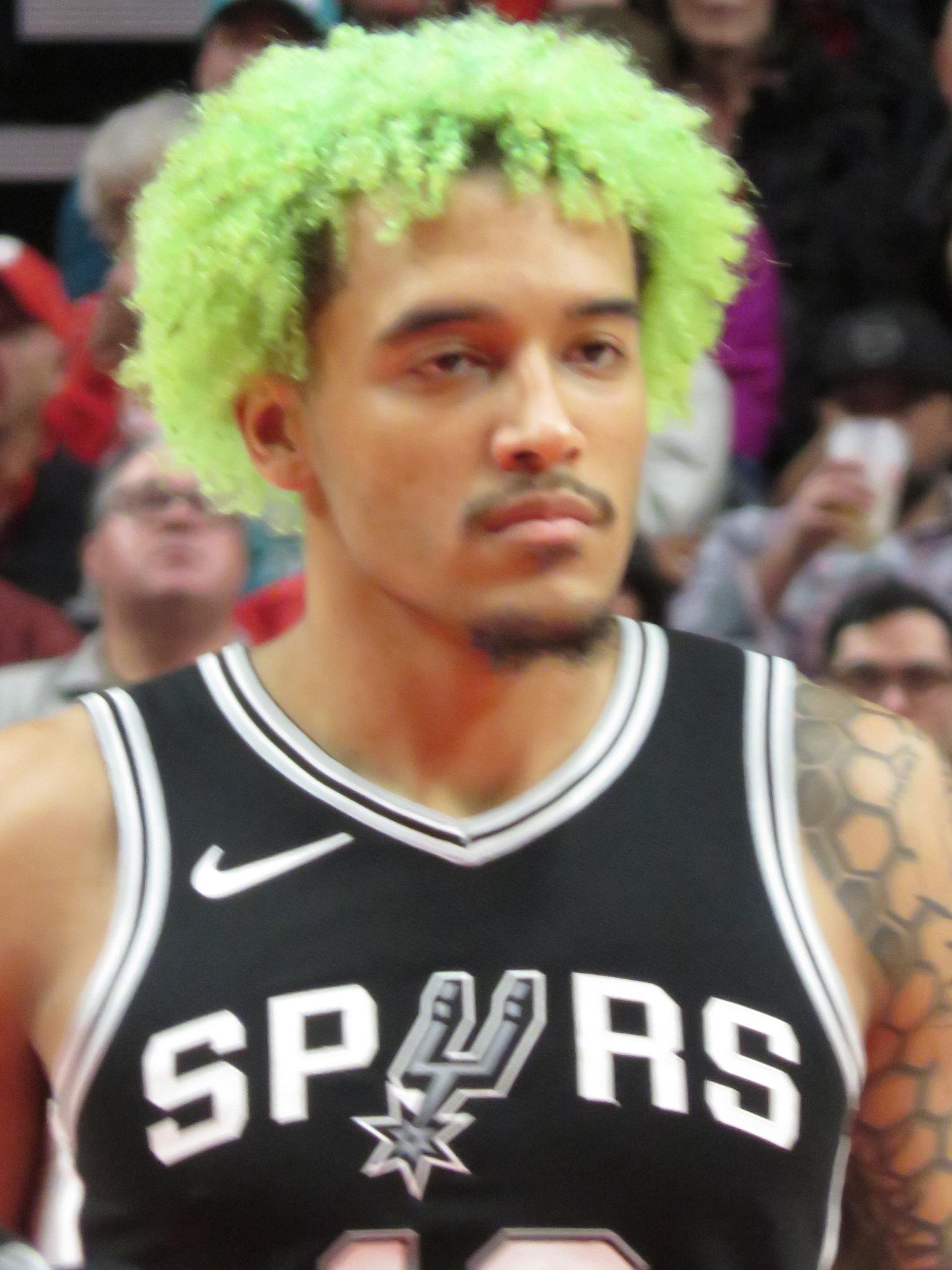
Jeremy Sochan, professional NBA basketball player for the San Antonio Spurs

- Carol Blazejowski (born 1956), women's professional basketball player
- Vince Boryla (1927–2016), former NBA player for the New York Knicks, first ever NBA All-Star player of Polish descent, coach, and Denver Nuggets executive
- Frank Brickowski (born 1959), 12-year NBA veteran
- Olek Czyż (born 1990), Duke Blue Devils and Nevada Wolf Pack NCAA player
- Dan Dickau (born 1978), former professional basketball and NBA player
- Phil Farbman (1924–1996), basketball player
- Kyle Filipowski (born 2003), drafted in 2024 NBA Draft by the Utah Jazz
- Mike Gminski (born 1959), former college and professional basketball player, 14-year NBA veteran
- Tom Gola (1933–2014), one of Philadelphia's most famous basketball players 5-time NBA All-Star and NBA Champion
- Joe Graboski (1930–1998), 13-year NBA veteran
- Bobby Hurley (born 1971), former Duke and NBA basketball player
- Frank Kaminsky (born 1993), current NBA player
- Joe Kopicki (born 1960), former NBA player
- Thomas Kelati (born 1982), professional basketball player in the Poland national team
- Len Kosmalski (born 1951), former NBA player
- Ronald Kozlicki (born 1944), former ABA basketball player
- Larry Krystkowiak (born 1964), 10-year NBA veteran
- Mike Krzyzewski (born 1947), head coach of the Duke University men's basketball team and the 2008 gold medal-winning U.S. men's Olympic basketball team
- Steve Kuberski (born 1947), former NBA player and NBA Champion, last ever Boston Celtic to wear no 33 jersey before the arrival of Larry Bird
- Bruce Kuczenski (born 1961), former basketball and NBA player
- Leo Kubiak (born 1926/1927), former BAA and minor league baseball player
- Mitch Kupchak (born 1954), former 9-year NBA veteran, NBA Champion and former general manager of the Los Angeles Lakers
- Bob Kurland (1924–2013), 7-foot basketball center
- Christian Laettner (born 1969), 13-year NBA veteran, NBA All-Star and a member of the 1992 Olympics men's team
- John Laskowski (born 1953), former Chicago Bulls player, nicknamed 'Super Sub'
- Hank Lefkowitz (1923–2007), former BAA player
- Red Mihalik (1916–1996), NCAA and Olympic official/referee
- Paul Mokeski (born 1957), 12-year NBA veteran
- Nick Muszynski (born 1998), professional basketball player for the Portland Trail Blazers
- Mike Peplowski (born 1970), former NBA player
- Eric Piatkowski (born 1970), former 14-year NBA veteran with the Los Angeles Clippers, Houston Rockets, Chicago Bulls and Phoenix Suns
- Walt Piatkowski (born 1945), former ABA player, Eric Piatkowski's father
- Stan Pietkiewicz (born 1956), former NBA player
- Dave Piontek (1934–2004), former 7-year NBA player
- Tom Piotrowski (born 1960), former NBA player
- Brandin Podziemski (born 2003), drafted in 2023 by Golden State Warriors
- Joe Proski (born 1939), first trainer of Phoenix Suns; inducted into Phoenix Ring of Fame in 2001
- Joel Przybilla (born 1979), former 13-year NBA veteran
- Ray Radziszewski (born 1935), former professional basketball player
- George Ratkovicz (1922–2008), former 6-year NBA player
- Jim Rowinski (born 1961), former NBA player
- Ed Sadowski (1917–1990), former BAA and NBA player
- Jeremy Sochan (born 2003), Polish-American professional basketball player for the San Antonio Spurs of the NBA. He is also a member of Poland men's national basketball team.
- Ed Stanczak (1921–2004), former NBA player
- Bob Sura (born 1973), former NBA player for the Cavaliers, Warriors, Pistons, Hawks and Rockets.
- Wally Szczerbiak (born 1977), former 10-year NBA veteran, NBA All-Star. Although his father claimed the family is of Ukrainian descent, Szczerbiak is a 100% Polish surname. Considering that most of the western part of today's Ukrainian territory was for centuries a part of the Polish empire, Polish roots of Szczerbiak's family are obvious.
- Walter Szczerbiak (born 1949), Wally Szczerbiak's father, former ABA player
- A.J. Slaughter (born 1987), professional basketball player in the Poland national team
- Cole Swider (born 1999), professional basketball player for the Indiana Pacers, also played for Los Angeles Lakers and Miami Heat
- Kaleb Tarczewski (born 1993), professional basketball player
- Kelly Tripucka (born 1959), former 10-year NBA veteran for the Detroit Pistons, Utah Jazz, and Charlotte Hornets, two-time NBA All-Star
- Dave Twardzik (born 1950), former NBA and ABA player, ABA All-Star and 1977 NBA Champion
- Jayson Williams (born 1968), former NBA player for the 76ers and New Jersey Nets, NBA All-Star in 1998. He is of Polish, Italian and African-American descent
- Steve Wojciechowski (born 1976), former head coach of the Marquette University men's basketball team
- Dennis Wuycik (born 1950), former ABA player
- Marcus Zegarowski (born 1998), professional basketball player

=== Bowling ===
- Eddie Lubanski, considered one of the greatest bowlers of all time; in the Guinness book of World Records

=== Boxing ===
- Bobby Czyz (born 1962), boxer
- Andrew Golota (born 1968), professional boxer from Poland who has been involved in many controversial fights
- Stanley Ketchel (1886–1910), boxer who became one of the greatest world middleweight champions
- Adam Kownacki (born 1989), heavyweight boxer born in Poland, and lived in the United States since 1996
- Stanley Poreda (1909–1983), Jersey City boxer considered a top heavyweight contender in the early 1930s
- Paweł Wolak (born 1981), former WBC USNBC Light Middleweight Champion
- Teddy Yarosz (1910–1974), NBA Middleweight Boxing Champion
- Tony Zale (1913–1997), two-time Middleweight World Champion Boxer

=== Fencing ===
- Monica Aksamit (born 1990), Olympic bronze medalist, Women's Team Saber
- Dagmara Wozniak (born 1988), Olympic bronze medalist, Women's Team Saber

=== Figure skating ===
- Tara Lipinski (born 1982), Olympic gold medalist figure skater and celebrity
- Janet Lynn (born 1953), figure skater and Olympic bronze medalist

=== Football ===
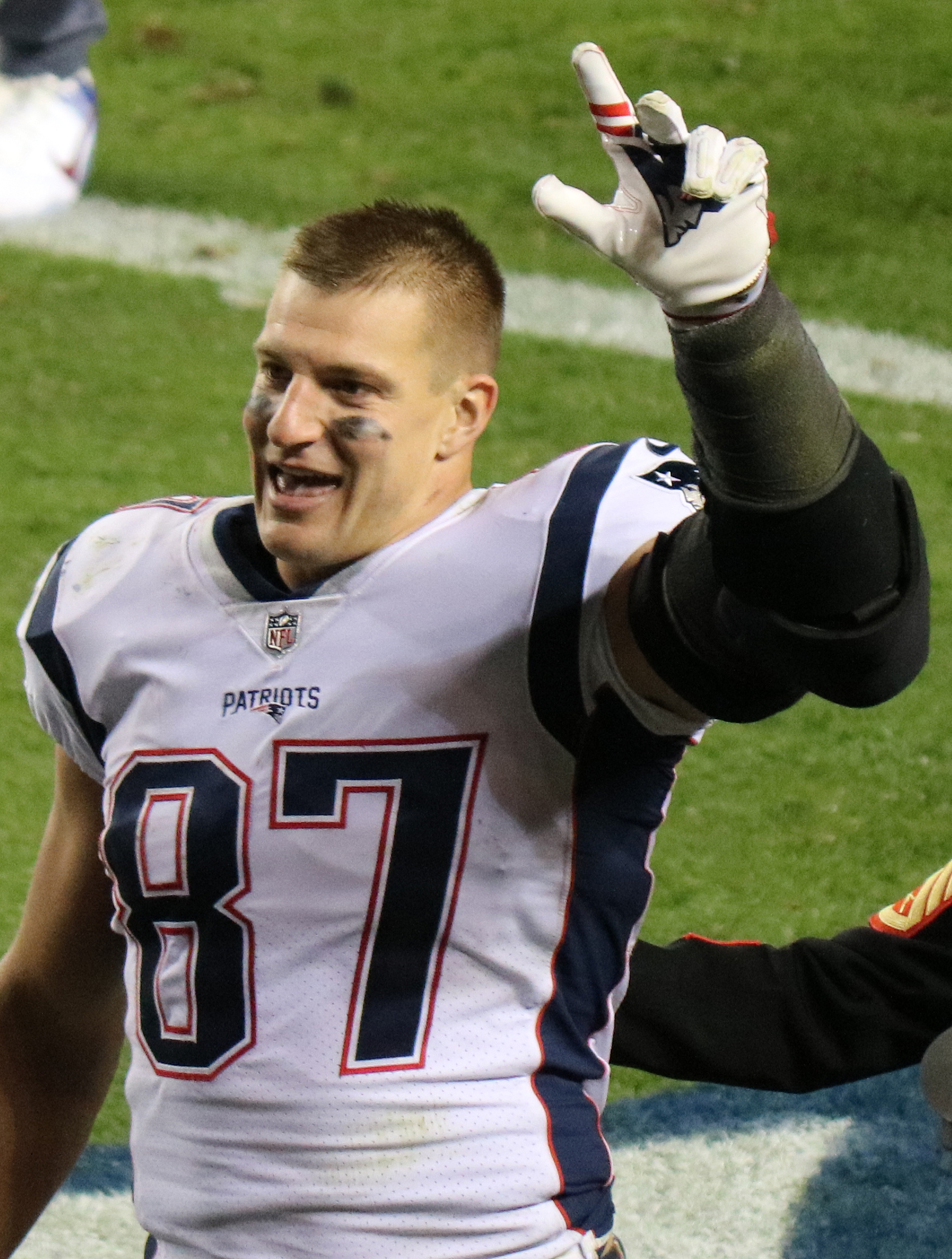
Rob Gronkowski former NFL tight end (TE) for the New England Patriots and Tampa Bay Buccaneers

- Danny Abramowicz (born 1945), wide receiver in the NFL who played for the New Orleans Saints and the San Francisco 49ers
- Pete Banaszak (born 1944), college and professional football player
- Steve Bartkowski (born 1952), former NFL quarterback
- Tom Brady (born 1977), 6 time Super Bowl champion, NFL quarterback for the New England Patriots; Maternal grandmother of Polish descent.
- Zeke Bratkowski (1931–2019), All-American quarterback at the University of Georgia in 1952 and 1953
- Bryan Bulaga (born 1989), NFL offensive tackle
- Carter Bykowski (born 1990), football player
- Frank Bykowski (1915–1985), football player
- Brad Cieslak (born 1982), tight end in the NFL; currently plays for the Cleveland Browns
- Lou Creekmur (1927–2009), NFL left offensive tackle/guard for the Detroit Lions from 1951 to 1959
- Frank Dancewicz (1924–1985), NFL quarterback
- Mike Ditka (1939–2026), NFL player, television commentator, and coach
- Julian Edelman (born 1986), New England Patriots player
- Frank Gatski (1919–2005), NFL player
- Mike Gesicki (born 1995), tight end in the NFL; currently plays for the Cincinnati Bengals
- Tom Glassic (born 1954), former NFL player, guard for the Denver Broncos of the NFL from 1976 to 1983
- Mark Glowinski (born 1992), football player
- Stephen Gostkowski (born 1984), placekicker for the New England Patriots of the NFL
- Jim Grabowski (born 1944), football player and broadcaster
- Bruce Gradkowski, quarterback for the Cincinnati Bengals
- Chris Gronkowski (born 1986), fullback for the Denver Broncos
- Dan Gronkowski (born 1985), tight end for the Cleveland Browns
- Rob Gronkowski (born 1989), former tight end for the New England Patriots
- Jack Ham (born 1948), former linebacker who played for the Pittsburgh Steelers
- Jim Harbaugh (born 1963), NFL quarterback and coach
- John Harbaugh (born 1962), NFL coach
- Leon Hart (1928–2002), tight end and defensive end
- Henry Hynoski (born 1988), fullback for the New York Giants
- Jim Irsay (born 1959), owner and CEO of the Indianapolis Colts
- Jeff Jagodzinski (born 1963), head coach of the Boston College Eagles football team
- Sebastian Janikowski (born 1978 in Poland), former kicker for the Oakland Raiders/Seattle Seahawks
- Vic Janowicz (1930–1996), halfback for Ohio State University
- Ron Jaworski (born 1951), former football player, NFL analyst on ESPN
- Kyle Juszczyk (born 1991), NFL player
- Mike Kenn (born 1956), former offensive tackle for the Atlanta Falcons
- Joe Klecko (born 1953), former NFL defensive end
- Gary Kubiak (born 1961), NFL coach and former player
- Frank Kush (1929–2017), football coach who most prominently served as head coach at Arizona State University for more than two decades
- Joe Kowalewski (born 1982), tight end for the New York Jets
- Brian Kozlowski (born 1970), former NFL tight end
- Glen Kozlowski (born 1962), wide receiver for the Chicago Bears
- Joe Kulbacki (1938–2012), Buffalo Bills
- Ted Kwalick (born 1947), former tight end in the NFL and World Football League
- Nick Kwiatkoski (born 1993), NFL linebacker
- Chris Liwienski (born 1975), former offensive guard
- Johnny Lujack (1925–2023), quarterback for the University of Notre Dame and the Chicago Bears
- Don Majkowski (born 1964), former NFL quarterback
- Stas Maliszewski (born 1944), Princeton All-American 1964 and 1965, Baltimore Colts 1966 NFL draft
- Ted Marchibroda (1931–2016), quarterback and head coach in the NFL
- Dan Marino, former quarterback for the Miami Dolphins
- John Matuszak (1950–1989), defensive end with the Oilers, Chiefs, and Raiders; son of Marv Matuszak
- Marv Matuszak (1931–2004), linebacker; son of John Matuszak
- Lou Michaels, former pro defensive lineman, 1958–1971, with the Colts, Steelers, Rams, and Packers
- Walt Michaels (1929–2019), player and coach, remembered for his six-year tenure as head coach of the New York Jets from 1977 to 1982
- Dick Modzelewski (1931–2018), college and pro football player with the Redskins, Steelers, Giants and Browns; coach for the Cleveland Browns; member of the College Football Hall of Fame
- Gene Mruczkowski (born 1980), offensive lineman for the New England Patriots of the NFL
- Scott Mruczkowski (born 1982), center, San Diego Chargers, Bowling Green
- Mike Munchak (born 1960), former pro offense with the Houston Oilers; Pro Football Hall of Fame
- Bronko Nagurski (1908–1990), NFL player and professional wrestler
- Ray Nitschke (1936–1998), Hall of Fame NFL linebacker for the Green Bay Packers
- Bill Osmanski (1915–1996), College and Pro Football Hall of Fame; player with Chicago Bears
- Walt Patulski (born 1950), former defensive end for the University of Notre Dame, Buffalo Bills, and St. Louis Cardinals
- Jason Pociask (born 1983), tight end for the New York Jets
- Paul Posluszny (born 1984), linebacker for the Jacksonville Jaguars
- Bill Romanowski (born 1966), former football player for the San Francisco 49ers and Oakland Raiders
- Tony Romo, NFL quarterback for the Dallas Cowboys
- Ed Rutkowski (born 1941), former wide receiver and quarterback for the Buffalo Bills; later became County Executive of Erie County (Buffalo)
- Jack Sack (1902–1980), American football player and coach
- John Sandusky (1925–2006), NFL player for the Browns and Packers, head coach of the Colts, of Irish and Polish descent.
- Mark Stepnoski, one of NFL's top linemen with the Dallas Cowboys
- Hank Stram (1923–2005), Head Coach, Kansas City Chiefs
- Mike Tomczak (born 1962), former NFL quarterback
- Frank Tripucka (1927–2013), quarterback for the Broncos, Cardinals and Lions
- Steve Wisniewski, former pro-bowler, offensive guard with the Oakland Raiders
- Alex Wojciechowicz (1915–1992), offensive lineman and linebacker for the Detroit Lions and Philadelphia Eagles
- Tom Zbikowski (born 1985), safety for the Baltimore Ravens

=== Golf ===
- Billy Burke (1902–1972), prominent golfer of the 1930s
- Jim Furyk (born May 12, 1970), professional golfer, 2003 U.S. Open winner, FedEx Cup Champion, PGA Tour Player of the Year, Ryder Cup captain
- Betsy King (born 1955), professional golfer
- Paul Stankowski (born 1969), professional golfer with two PGA Tour wins; finished tied for 5th at the 1997 Masters as well as a tie for 17th at the 1997 U.S. Open
- Bob Toski (born 1926), golf player and teacher
- Al Watrous (1899–1983), PGA champion
- Walt Zembriski (born May 4, 1935), former ironworker; played on both the PGA and Senior PGA tour

=== Hockey ===
- Justin Abdelkader (born 1987), left wing for the Detroit Red Wings from Muskegon, Michigan
- Matt Bartkowski (born 1988), defenseman for the Minnesota Wild from Pittsburgh, Pennsylvania
- Eric Boguniecki (born 1975), center for the Anaheim Ducks from New Haven, Connecticut
- Jonny Brodzinski (born 1993), forward for the Los Angeles Kings from Blaine, Minnesota
- Len Ceglarski (1926–2017), U.S. Olympic ice hockey team silver medal winner, 1952
- Austin Czarnik (born 1992), center for the Calgary Flames from Washington, Michigan
- Alex Goligoski (born 1985), defenseman for the Arizona Coyotes from Grand Rapids, Minnesota
- Patrick Kaleta (born 1986), retired NHL forward from Angola, New York
- Mike Komisarek (born 1982), defenseman for the Toronto Maple Leafs from West Islip, New York
- Ed Olczyk (born 1966), former head coach and player in the National Hockey League
- Joe Pavelski (born 1984), center for the Dallas Stars from Stevens Point, Wisconsin
- Lee Stempniak (born 1983), NHL free agent
- Andy Welinski (born 1993), defenseman for the Philadelphia Flyers from Duluth, Minnesota
- Zach Werenski (born 1997), defenseman for the Columbus Blue Jackets from Grosse Pointe, Michigan
- James Wisniewski (born 1984), defenseman for the Columbus Blue Jackets from Canton, Michigan
- Luke Witkowski (born 1990), defenseman for the Tampa Bay Lightning from Holland, Michigan
- Andy Wozniewski (born 1980), retired NHL defenseman

=== Media ===
- Adrian Wojnarowski (born 1968/69), Yahoo! Sports NBA reporter (The Vertical), originator of the "Woj Bomb"

=== Olympic athletes ===
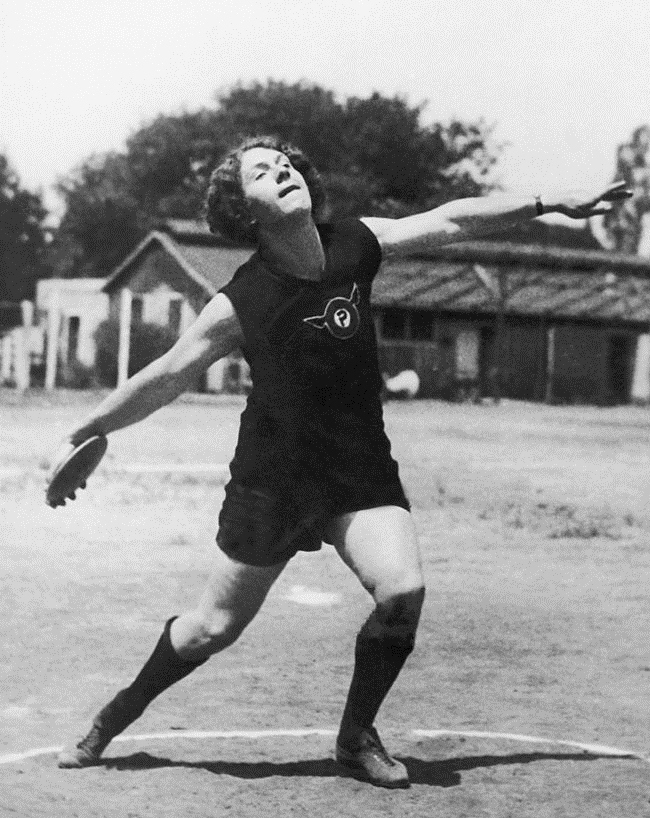
Lillian Copeland, Olympic discus champion; set world records in discus, javelin and shot put

- Monica Aksamit (born 1990), Olympic bronze medalist, Women's Team Saber
- Lillian Copeland (1904–1964), Olympic discus champion; set world records in discus, javelin, and shot put
- Alyson Dudek (born 1990), short track speed skater at the 2010 and 2014 Winter Olympics; won bronze in 2010
- Mark Gorski (born 1960), track cyclist; gold medal
- Bob Gutowski (1935–1960), pole vaulter; won silver at 1956 Summer Olympics
- Jeffrey Klepacki, rower in 1992, 1996 and 2000 Olympics; won Rowing World Championship titles in 1994, 1998 and 1999
- Christopher Liwski, rower in 2004 and 2008 Olympic teams (alternate); won Rowing World Championship title in 2007
- Norbert Schemansky (1924–2016), gold, silver and bronze Olympic m in weightlifting
- Jenn Suhr (née Stuczynski), pole vaulter, won silver at 2008 Summer Olympics
- Stanisława Walasiewicz (a.k.a. Stella Walsh) (1911–1980), athlete and Olympic champion
- Dagmara Wozniak (born 1988), Olympic bronze medalist, Women's Team Saber
- Sam Mikulak (born 1992), retired three time Olympian, Artistic Gymnastics

=== Soccer ===
- Brad Guzan, USA international goalkeeper currently playing for Atlanta United
- Wojtek Krakowiak (born 1976), soccer player; most recently for the Tampa Bay Mutiny of Major League Soccer
- Matt Miazga (born 1995), soccer player for Chelsea F.C. and for the United States men's national soccer team; currently loaned to SBV Vitesse.
- Gabriel Slonina (born 2004), soccer player for Chicago Fire FC
- Danny Szetela (born 1987), soccer player for the Columbus Crew of the MLS
- Chris Wondolowski (born 1983), soccer player for the San Jose Earthquakes of the MLS; 2010 MLS Golden Boot winner

=== Wrestling ===
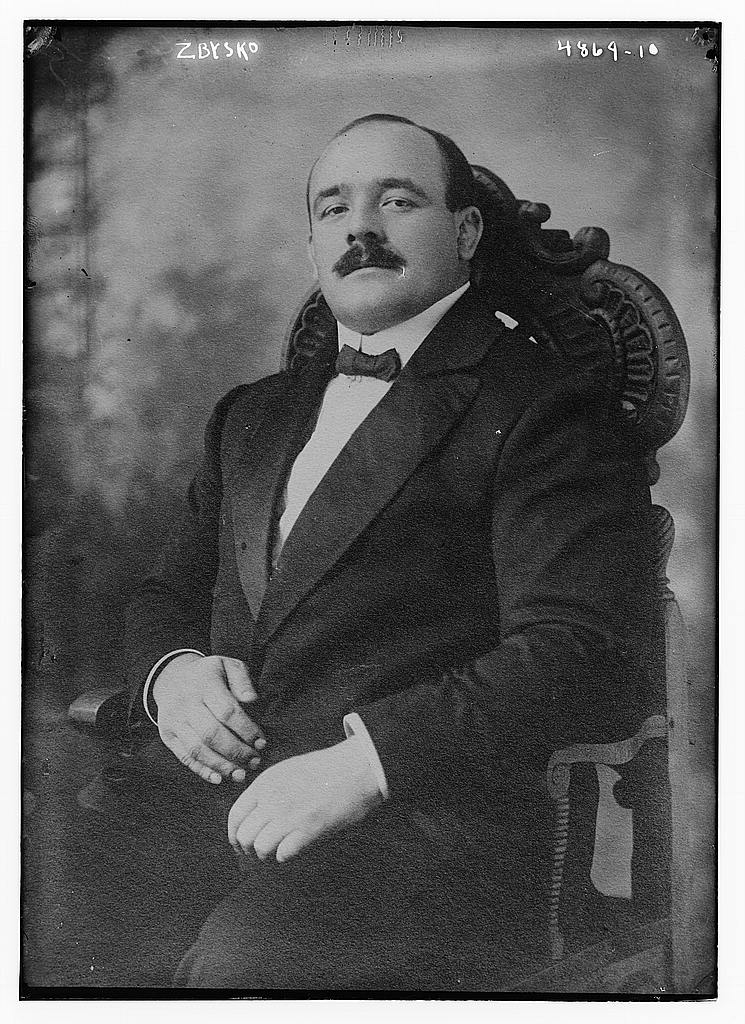
Stanislaus Zbyszko Polish strongman, U.S. sport promoter, millionaire and 2-time World Heavyweight Champion

- CM Punk (born 1978), Polish descent by mother
- Ole Anderson (born 1942)
- Killer Kowalski (1926–2008)
- Chris Mordetsky (born 1983)
- Beth Phoenix (born 1980), Polish descent by both parents
- Ivan Putski (born 1941), Polish-born American professional wrestler and champion
- Stanley Radwan (1908–1998), professional wrestler and strongman
- Trish Stratus (born 1975)
- Greg "The Hammer" Valentine (born 1950)
- Johnny Valentine (1928–2001)
- Rob Van Dam (born 1970), Belgian and Polish descent by grandparents
- Velvet Sky (born 1981)
- Stanislaus Zbyszko (1879–1967)

=== Other sports ===
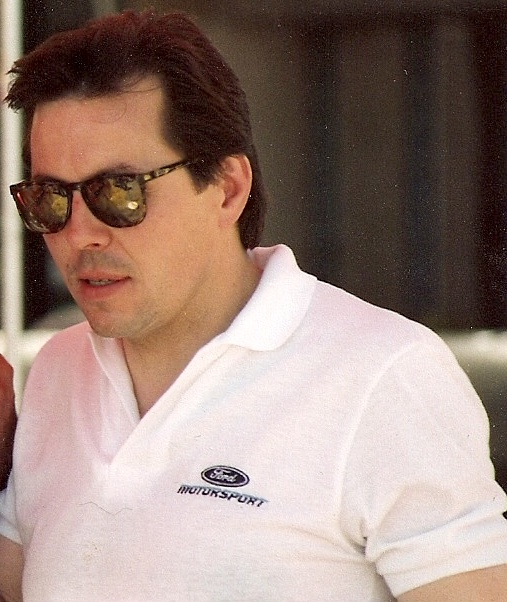
Alan Kulwicki, NASCAR driver and winner of the 1992 NASCAR Winston Cup Series

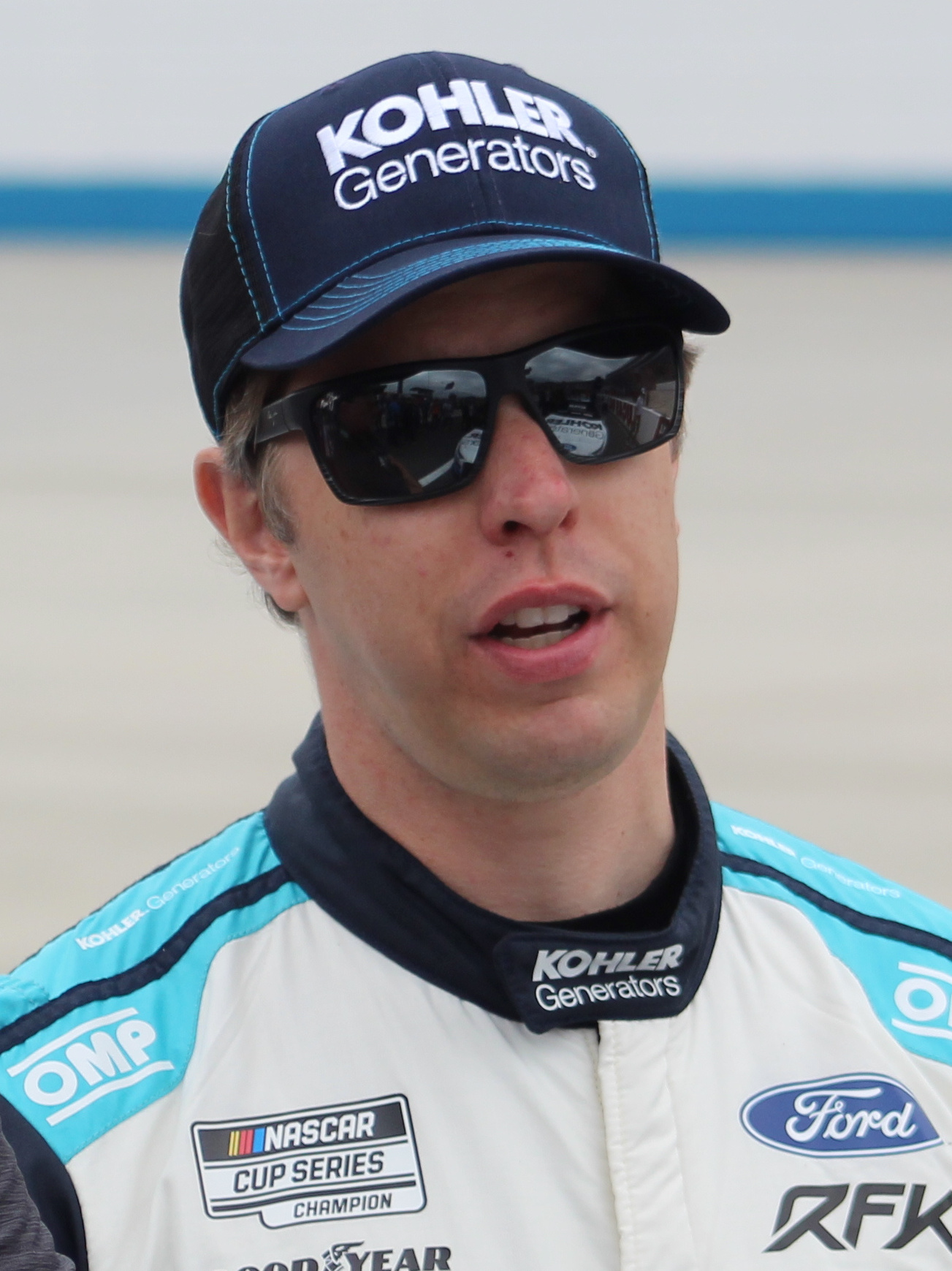
Brad Keselowski, NASCAR driver and winner of the 2012 NASCAR Sprint Cup Series and 2010 NASCAR Nationwide Series

- Tony Adamowicz (1941–2016), champion SCCA and IMSA road racing driver
- Jane Bartkowicz (born 1949), a top woman U.S. tennis player in the 1960s
- Frank Cumiskey (1912–2004), Olympic gymnast
- Kevin Cywinski (born 1965), NASCAR driver
- Arthur Dake (1910–2000), Grand Master chess player
- Stefan Janoski (born 1979), professional skateboarder of half-Polish, half-Irish descent; one of the most recognized pro skateboarders
- Henryk Jordan (1842–1907), philanthropist, physician, and pioneer of physical education in Poland
- Brad Keselowski (born 1984), NASCAR driver
- Brian Keselowski (born 1981), NASCAR driver
- Ed Korfanty, fencing master, U.S. National Women's saber coach, Olympic saber coach, and a former Men's Veteran's Saber World Champion
- Alan Kulwicki (1954–1993), auto racing champion
- Dylan Kwasniewski (born 1995), NASCAR driver
- Thai-Son Kwiatkowski (born 1995), tennis player
- Billy Packer (born 1940), sportscaster for CBS Sports
- Gary Styczynski (born 1965), professional poker player; won the 2007 World Series of Poker

== Other ==
- John Ogonowski (1951–2001) Airline pilot, farming advocate, and victim of the September 11th Attacks
- George Adamski (1891–1965), one of the first people to publicly claim to have seen and photographed UFOs
- Francis E. Dec (1926–1996), outsider writer and predecessor to targeted individuals
- Jan Lewan (born 1941), songwriter and polka band leader (known as the "Polka King"), who ran a Ponzi scheme
- Curtis Sliwa (born 1954), Guardian Angels founder
- Wilfrid Michael Voynich (1865–1930), antiquarian and bibliophile, and the eponym of the Voynich manuscript

=== Criminals ===
- Leon Czolgosz (1873–1901), assassin of U.S. President William McKinley
- John Wayne Gacy (1942–1994), serial killer, of Polish and Danish ancestry. His paternal grandparents (family name spelled "Gatza" or "Gaca") were from what is now Poland, then part of the German Empire.
- Steven Kazmierczak (1980–2008), perpetrator of the 2008 Northern Illinois University shooting
- Richard "Iceman" Kuklinski (1935–2006), notorious hitman, claimed to have killed 200 people
- Meyer Lansky (1902–1983), organized crime figure who was instrumental in the development of the National Crime Syndicate in the United States
- Henry Earl J. Wojciechowski (aka Hymie Weiss) (1898–1926), mob boss and rival of Al Capone
- John Wojnowski (born 1943), protester against pedophilia in the Catholic Church.
