= Cass Lewart =

American engineer

Cass Lewart is an author, electrical engineer and Polish Holocaust survivor. He has written extensively on computer and data communication, as well as non-fiction articles on his life experiences. He is also a speaker on computer related topic and an award-winning computer hobbyist.

== Career ==
Cass Lewart has written 10 books and numerous articles relating to personal computers, database programming and data communication. He worked in the electrical engineering field for 40 years and is an avid computer hobbyist. His writings on computer related topics include the Modem Handbook for the Communications Professional published in 1987 and his most recent book The Ultimate Modem Handbook published by Simon & Schuster. The Ultimate Modem Handbook was reviewed by Robert Slade in an industry publication and his books have been used as sources for New York Times technology articles.

He and his wife were 2005 recipients of the Amateur Computer Group of New Jersey: Hobbyist of the Year award. Cass has been a speaker at computer clubs meetings and contributed papers to the Trenton Computer Festival Annual Proceedings Book.

He wrote a short memoir on his experiences growing up in Poland during World War II and his survival of the Holocaust (Shoah). as well as the non-fiction story Pleasure of Winning.
