= Chez Raginiak =

Polish author

Chez Raginiak is an author. Raginiak was born and raised in communist Poland. In 1985, when he was 25 years old, Raginiak escaped Poland. By securing a temporary exit visa to Italy during the "Polish Pope" travel thaw of the mid-1980s. He crossed the Alps from Italy to Austria where he spent the next 6 months in an Austrian refugee camp before relocating to the United States.

His first book, My Escape To Freedom, was nominated for a Midwest Book Award in 2008. His second book, Learn English Without Teachers, is being translated to Spanish, Polish, Arabic, Hmong, Somali, and Burmese. His third book, Tradition! What's your polka?, was endorsed by Jack Canfield, author of Chicken Soup for the Soul.
