= Polish American Museum =

Polish-American museum in Port Washington, New York, U.S.

Coordinates: 40°49′45.44″N 73°41′23.56″W

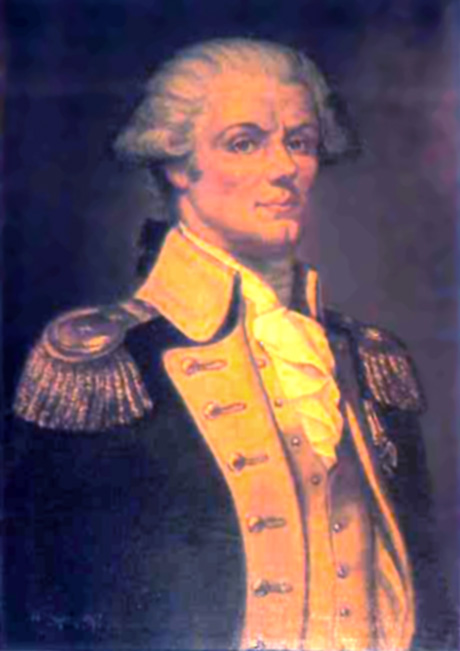
Portrait of Tadeusz Kościuszko (1746–1817) at the Polish American Museum

The Polish American Museum is located at 16 Belleview Avenue in Port Washington, New York, USA. It was founded on January 20, 1977. It features displays of folk art, costumes, historical artifacts and paintings, as well as bilingual research library with particular focus on achievements of the people of Polish heritage in America.

Nearly everything in the museum, which is housed at the old Port Washington library, was donated by members of the community: from the war memorabilia, army uniforms, Polish medals and weapons, to the books about Poland in both English and Polish. Barbara Szydlowski, president of the museum, remarked that many Polish immigrants made their way to Nassau County about a century ago to work in North Shore estates, but their descendants are dispersed. "We're trying to do more on the history of Poles on Long Island," she said, "but it's very hard because the population is so scattered."

The Museum puts a strong emphasis on famous people of Polish ancestry with a portrait of Pope John Paul II displayed prominently along with that of Tadeusz Kościuszko wearing the uniform of Brigadier General of the American Revolutionary Army, and Kazimierz Pułaski as General Commander of the Cavalry under George Washington. There is a room dedicated to Polish Nobel Prize laureates including Marie Curie and Lech Wałęsa. In the music room there are plaster replicas of Frédéric Chopin's death mask and of his left hand, brought in from Warsaw by a museum member. One of the most poignant items on display is the blue-and-white striped jacket of a concentration-camp inmate, a Polish prisoner who was held by the Germans in World War II, donated by a patron who survived as many as seven different camps in 1944–1945, which is now a part of the Holocaust exhibit. One annex of the museum, that has been receiving visitor accolades is the CMS Annex. The CMS (Center for Military Studies Annex) features the military stories of Poles and Polish Americans that took part in the many wars and campaigns that shaped both US and Polish history. Among the featured exhibits is Long Island's own Frank Gabreski the top U.S. ace in the European Theater during WW2.

The current director is Gerald Kochan.

== Museum archives ==
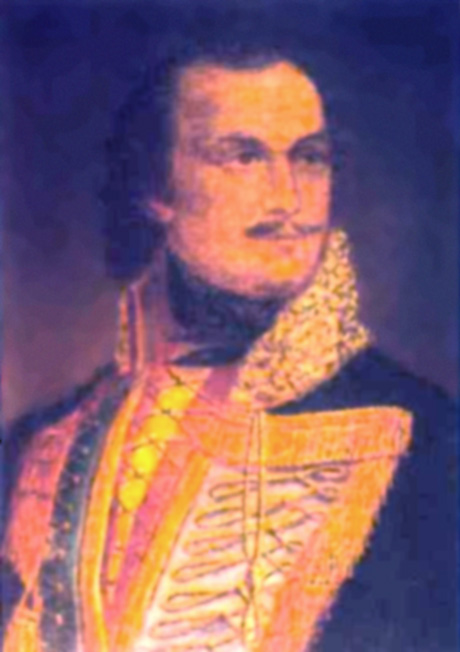
Portrait of Kazimierz Pułaski at the Museum

Archival holdings of the Museum include artifacts related to the history of Poland and Polish American community such as the extensive Henry Archacki Archive, and the collection of Polish-American art (ca. 1900–1990). Research materials concerning Polish history and culture include records of Polish American participation in the American Civil War, historical writings and notes, photographs, personal letters, audio and video tapes, clippings, newsletters, directories and certificates. Materials about Polish-American organizations feature documents from Polish National Alliance, Polish Roman Catholic Union of America, Polish Falcons of America, and information on Polish press published in the United States, not to mention the correspondence between many Polish-American writers, painters, sculptors, photographers, historians, and military officers. Quantity: ca. 50 cu ft (1.4 m^{3}).

Museum holdings include also old maps, as well as the library and the collection of artifacts from the Polish Institute of Arts and Sciences of America about the lives of people of Polish heritage. Original photographic and lithographic displays, at the reading room, are held during special events throughout the year. The Polish American Museum is a unique educational resource designed to familiarize its visitors with the culture and folk heritage of the Polish people. It aspires to illustrate the contributions of people of Polish heritage not only to America, but also to humanity.

== See also ==
- Jamestown Polish craftsmen
- List of Polish Americans
- National Polish-American Sports Hall of Fame
- Polish Americans
- Polish Museum of America
- 1619 Jamestown Polish craftsmen strike
- Zbigniew Stefanski

== Related reading ==
- "Jamestown Colony: A Political, Social, and Cultural History (2007)"
- "Jamestown Pioneers from Poland, 1608-1958 (1958)"
- "Poles in the United States (1912)"
