= Polish Museum of America =

Museum in Chicago, Illinois

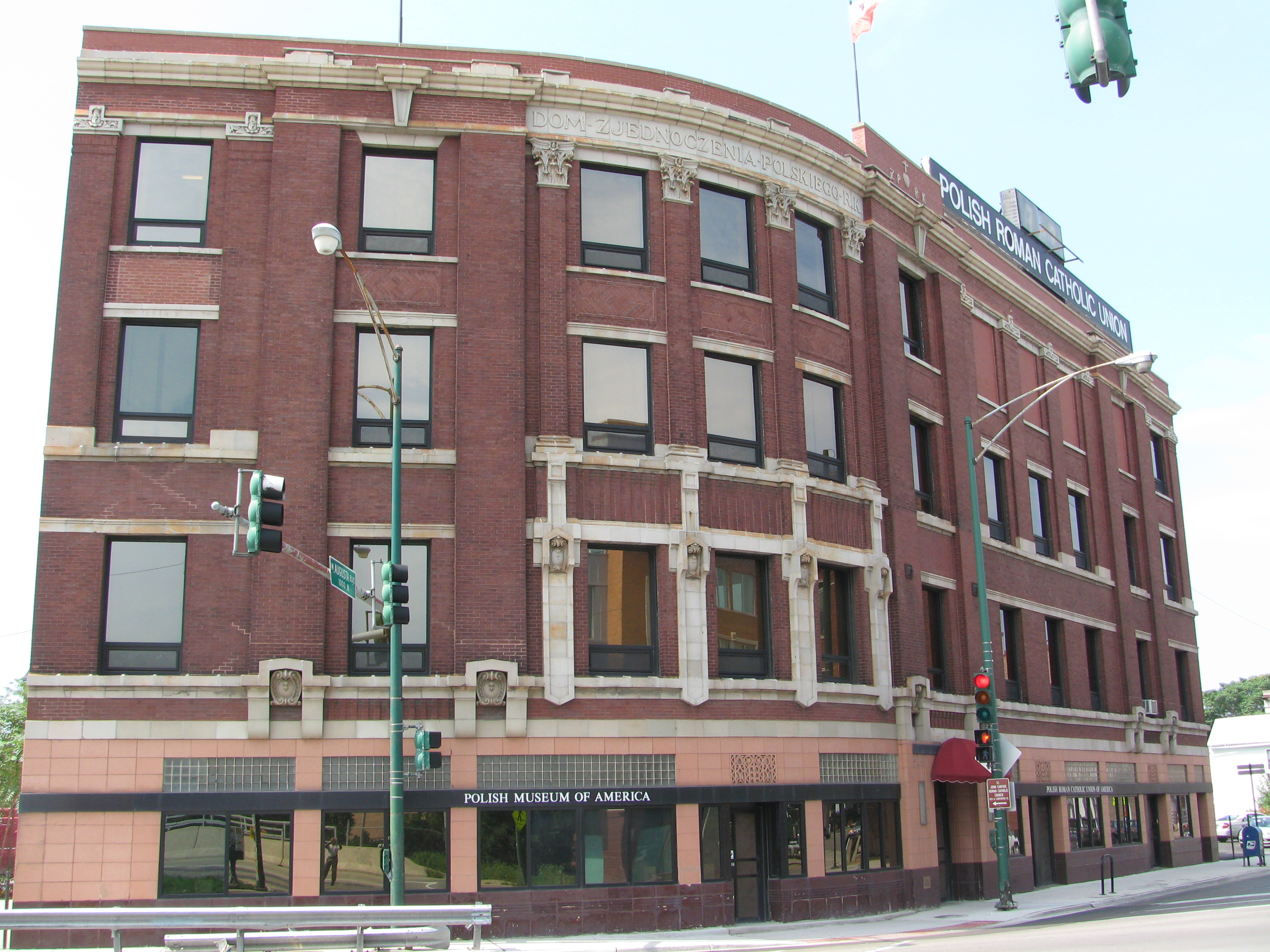
- Established: 1935
- Location: 984 N Milwaukee Avenue; Chicago, Illinois 60622; United States
- Coordinates: 41.8996°N 87.6612°W
- Director: Malgorzata Kot
- Website: www.polishmuseumofamerica.org
- Polish Roman Catholic Union of America
- U.S. National Register of Historic Places
- Location within Chicago metropolitan area Location within Illinois
- Location: 984 N. Milwaukee Ave., Chicago, Illinois
- Area: less than one acre
- Built: 1913
- Architect: Flizikowski, John S.
- Architectural style: Classical Revival, Art Deco
- MPS: Ethnic (European) Historic Settlement in the city of Chicago 1860-1930 MPS
- NRHP reference No.: 12001114
- Added to NRHP: January 2, 2013

The Polish Museum of America is located in West Town, in what had been the historical Polish Downtown neighborhood of Chicago. It is home to numerous Polish artifacts, artwork, and embroidered folk costumes in its growing collection. Founded in 1935, it is one of the oldest ethnic museums in the United States and a Core Member of the Chicago Cultural Alliance, a consortium of 25 ethnic museums and cultural centers in Chicago.

Each year, the museum organizes several exhibitions, publishes accompanying bilingual catalogs, and conducts a wide range of public programming, frequently in collaboration with other museums, educational institutions, and cultural centers. It promotes the knowledge of Polish history and culture by focusing on Polish and Polish American art through its collection of paintings, sculptures, drawings and lithographs by well-known artists. In addition to exhibits the Polish Museum of America also maintains cultural programs such as lectures, movies and slide presentations, theater performances, meetings with schools and people dedicated to Polish Culture from all over the world.

The museum serves as the focus of official commemorations of Casimir Pulaski Day where various city and state officials congregate to pay tribute to Chicago's Polish Community.

The building at 984 North Milwaukee Avenue is on the National Register of Historic Places.

== History ==
After a fire wiped out the Polish Library and National Museum at Alliance College in 1931, prominent voices in the Polish-American community began agitating for a venue in the United States which could both promote Polish culture and history as well as attest to the Polish presence in North America.

The Polish Museum of America was established in 1935 as the "Museum and Archives of the Polish Roman Catholic Union of America". Miecislaus Haiman was appointed its first curator, archivist and chief librarian. The museum officially opened its doors on January 12, 1937.

== Building ==
The Polish Museum of America is located within the headquarters of the Polish Roman Catholic Union of America. Designed by John S. Flizikowski, a notable Polish-American architect, construction began on the building in July 1912. Built of pressed brick in the Classical Revival style, the building is augmented by later Art Deco terracotta decorations inspired by Polish folkloric motifs. Listed as possessing potentially significant architectural or historical features, the building was ranked as orange in the city commissioned Chicago Historic Resources Survey, only one step below the most important designation of red.

== Permanent exhibitions ==
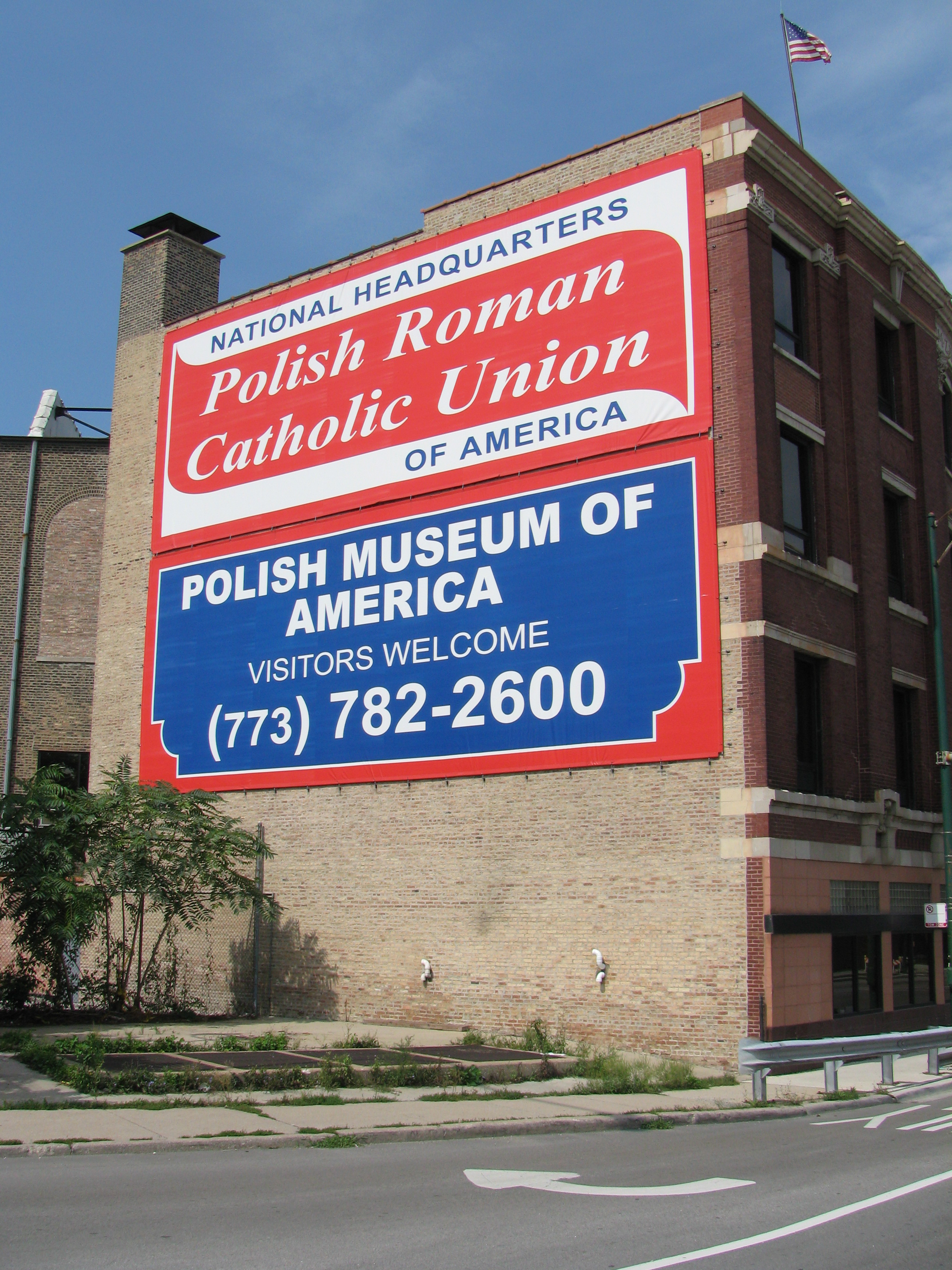
Polish Museum of America and Polish Roman Catholic Union signs that are visible to westbound travelers on the Kennedy Expressway

- The Entry Hall stairwell is lined with works by Polish and Polish American artists focusing on poster art dealing with war relief for Poland by the likes of Wladyslaw Benda.
- The art gallery on the third floor, closed for some five years, was completely rebuilt and opened to the public on November 5, 2011. It is now named the Stephen and Elizabeth Ann Kusmierczak Art Gallery and displays an array of paintings and sculptures from some of Poland's finest and most well-known artists. Much of the collection traveled to the New York World's Fair in 1939. After the September 1939 invasion of Poland by both Nazi and Soviet forces, it was purchased and preserved by the Polish Roman Catholic Union and transferred to Chicago.
- The Folk Costumes exhibit highlights Polish folk costumes from various regions of Poland.
- The Folk Crafts displays are a collection of antique traditional Polish folk crafts. This unique collection also includes ceramics, metalwork, and decorative wood-carved objects from the 19th and 20th centuries. In addition, the museum holds an impressive collection of pisanki (Polish Easter eggs).
- The Tadeusz Kościuszko Collection is composed of 73 handwritten letters, as well as medals, sketches, and other artifacts dealing with Tadeusz Kościuszko, including plans dealing with the Battle of Saratoga.
- The Maritime room is a collection of model ships and memorabilia focusing on Poland's Interwar period.
- The Military collection is a display featuring uniforms, medals, and materials showing the participation of Poles and Polish Americans in conflicts both domestic and foreign throughout the 19th and 20th centuries.
- The Helena Modjeska exhibit is a collection of theater costumes, posters and artifacts dealing with famed Polish-American Shakespearean actress Helena Modjeska that were donated by Chicago journalist Anthony Czarnecki in 1947.
- The Paderewski Room is an annex to the main portion of the museum highlighting the life of the composer and Polish statesman Ignacy Jan Paderewski, holding the largest collection of Paderewski memorabilia worldwide. On display are the pen with which he signed the Treaty of Versailles, a Steinway piano specially constructed for the pianist, and furnishings from the suite he had occupied for the last two years of his life in New York City's posh Buckingham Hotel.
- The Panna Maria exhibits contain objects and artifacts from and relating to the oldest Polish settlement in the United States in Panna Maria, Texas, including the original Stations of the Cross from the first church built by Poles in North America.
- The Pope John Paul II collection shows objects and artifacts dealing with Pope John Paul II, The exhibit focuses on memorabilia dealing with Pope John Paul II in Chicago, particularly his official visit to the city in 1979 as Pope.
- The Casimir Pulaski collection is composed of letters and artifacts dealing with General Casimir Pulaski.
- Stained Glass, Kossak & de Rosen exhibits
- Model train collection
- Polish Sailing Exhibit

Some of the museum's most precious holdings include a sleigh that was a gift of the Polish King Stanislaus Leszczynski to his daughter, sculptures by famed cult artist Stanislav Szukalski, a collection of original drawings by Count Thaddeus von Zukotynski, exhibits from the Polish Pavilion at the 1939 New York World's Fair, as well as a bas relief carved in salt from the Wieliczka Salt Mine.

The museum also possesses the painting of "Pulaski at Savannah" by Stanisław Kaczor Batowski, which was exhibited at the Century of Progress Fair in 1933 where it won first place. After the fair closed, the painting went on display at The Art Institute of Chicago where it was unveiled by Eleanor Roosevelt on July 10, 1934, and was on exhibit until its purchase by the Polish Women's Alliance on the museum's behalf in 1939. Another important painting is an extremely rare portrait of Edward Kozłowski, the first Polish priest to be named (1914) a Bishop of Milwaukee, and the second (after Chicago's Paul Peter Rhode) Polish bishop in the history of the Roman Catholic Church in America.

== Library and archives ==
The library and archives at The Polish Museum of America were organized simultaneously with the museum's opening, to meet the research needs of its staff, visiting researchers, students and members of the general public interested in Polish and Polish-American history. The archives of the Polish Museum of America hold numerous paintings, documents, coins and artifacts relating to the history of Poland and Polonia. Its impressive inventories run the gamut from its collection of 730 jubilee books of Polish Roman Catholic parishes to the recruitment records of volunteers for the Polish Army in France. The library's collections are an essential resource for the museum's research, exhibition development and educational programs.

== Alleged haunting ==
One of the most visited rooms is the Ignace Paderewski Room, which was started around June 1941 through generous donations from his sister Antonina Paderewski Wilkonska. The room also includes items donated from the Buckingham Hotel in New York City where Paderewski spent the last months of his life. The room was officially opened to the public on November 3, 1941. Many believe that the museum and in particular the Paderewski Room is haunted, perhaps by Paderewski himself. The staff recounts a number of incidents related by a number of people, including the cleaning crew who have claimed to experience ghostly-related phenomena late at night. The Ghost Research Society was even brought in by the museum staff to investigate these claims.

According to the Ghost Research Society's Website:

According to an article in the Polish Museum of America's Newsletter of Autumn 2004 written by Mr. Kurdek:

"Operations Manager Rich Kujawa is our resident Paderewski expert and chief raconteur about these eerie events. Over the past few years, Rich has made a ritual of placing flowers on the mantel over the PR's (Paderewski's Room) fireplace on the maestro's birthday, November 6, and also on June 29, the day he died. Rich has noticed that the flowers and their fragrance endure well beyond November 6, while those from June 29 strangely leave no scent and die within a few days. Rich also recalls an incident that occurred while he was giving a tour of the PR to a school group. For some odd reason, the cassette tape began playing Paderewski's Minuet on its own, and then just as mysteriously stopped playing after a short while.

"Also two former Mormon missionary museum volunteers told Rich they would periodically hear the sound of someone typing while they were working on a poster project in the PR. On display in that room is Paderewski's typewriter. Rich says Paderewski was known as a practical joker in life, so perhaps what we've been witnessing is the handiwork of a mischievous but basically benevolent ghost. Another source of unusual tales is Helena Glinczak of our maintenance staff. Helena has long felt 'spooked' by a presence in the PR, but she has since learned to live with it. A former weekend guide also often spoke of her reluctance to enter the PR for the same reason."

Other experiences are of an olfactory nature and have been smelled by Kurdek on the first floor, near the museum's conference room and the adjoining corridor. He has gotten a whiff of something burning and food cooking when there was no source to explain this.

== See also ==
- Jamestown Polish craftsmen
- List of Polish Americans
- Memoirs of a Merchant (Pamiętnik handlowca) - diary (1625)
- National Polish-American Sports Hall of Fame
- Polish American Museum
- Polish Americans
- 1619 Jamestown Polish craftsmen strike
- Zbigniew Stefanski

== Related reading ==
- "Jamestown Colony: A Political, Social, and Cultural History (2007)"
- "Jamestown Pioneers from Poland, 1608-1958 (1958)"
- "Poles in the United States (1912)"
