= Frank Szymanski =

American football player (1923–1987)

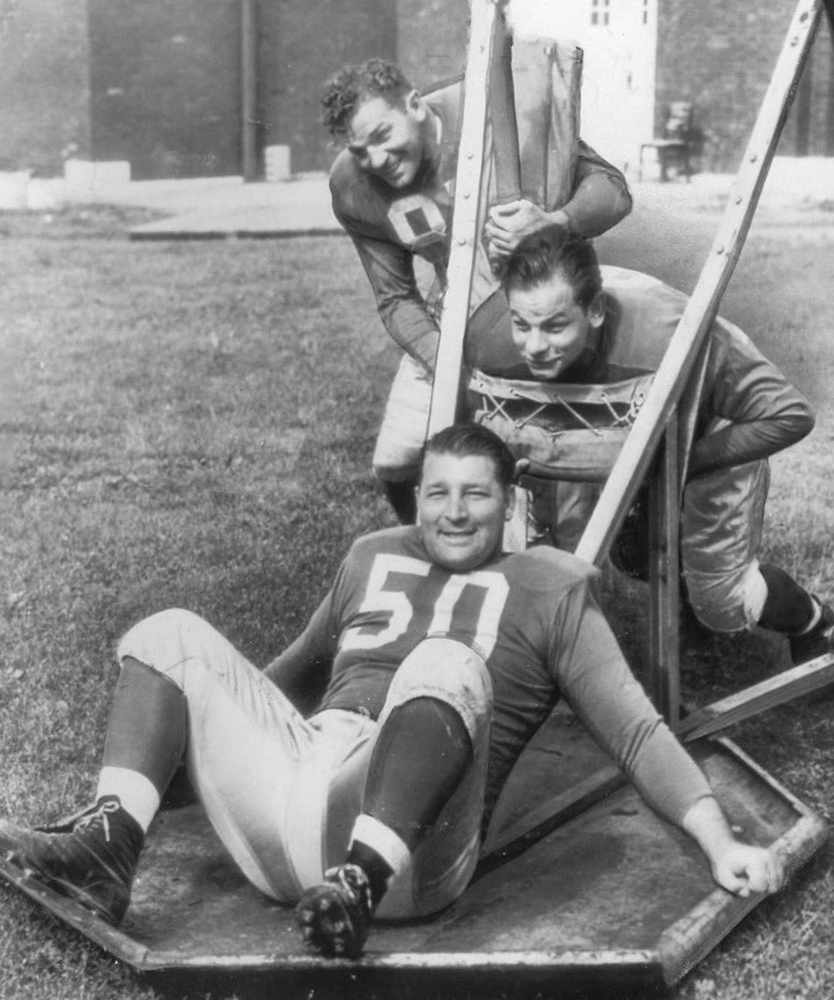
- Szymanski (right) in 1946

No. 83, 51, 44
- Position: Center

Personal information
- Born: July 6, 1923; Detroit, Michigan, U.S.
- Died: April 26, 1987 (aged 63); Detroit, Michigan, U.S.
- Listed height: 5 ft 11 in (1.80 m)
- Listed weight: 225 lb (102 kg)

Career information
- High school: Northwestern (Detroit)
- College: Notre Dame
- NFL draft: 1945: 1st round, 6th overall pick

Career history
- Detroit Lions (1945–1947); Philadelphia Eagles (1948); Chicago Bears (1949)

Awards and highlights
- NFL champion (1948); National champion (1943)

Career NFL statistics
- Games played: 47
- Games started: 9
- Fumble recoveries: 4
- Interceptions: 1
- Stats at Pro Football Reference

Frank Szymanski (July 6, 1923 – April 26, 1987) was an American professional football player and probate judge in Wayne County, MI. He played college football at the University of Notre Dame and played for three teams in the National Football League (NFL), winning an NFL Championship with the Philadelphia Eagles in 1948. Szymanski was of Polish descent.

== Football ==
=== High school ===
While living in Detroit, Szymanski played football at Northeastern High School and was voted to both All-City and All-State teams. He was elected to All-City teams as both a fullback and guard, and to All-State team as a tackle.

=== College ===
Szymanski played for the Notre Dame Fighting Irish under Frank Leahy in 1943 and under Edward McKeever in 1944. In 1943 he started at center and linebacker for all ten games of the Irish's 9–1 season, after which they were named unanimous national champions for the first time since 1930. He also played in the 1943 College All-Star Game defeating the defending NFL Champion Washington Redskins 27–7. Szymanski served in the Navy for the beginning of the 1944 season and rejoined the team after a medical discharge for a 59–0 loss to rival Army which remains the largest defeat in Irish history. The Irish did not lose a game for the rest of the season as Szymanski played both sides of the ball, amounting 173 minutes of playing time in the final 180 minutes of the season.

=== NFL career ===
Szymanski was selected by the Detroit Lions in the first round of the 1945 NFL Draft as the sixth pick overall. He played in six games in his rookie season but recorded the only interception of his career. Szymanski started his first game for the Lions in 1946 during a 10 loss season. He continued to play for the Lions in 1947, playing in a career high 12 games and recording two fumble recoveries before moving to the Philadelphia Eagles for the 1948 season. On November 15, 1947, the Lions paid tribute to their center by celebrating "Szymanski day" at historic Briggs Stadium. Szymanski arrived in Philadelphia at the right time and played in nine games during the season that brought the Eagles their first NFL Championship. The Eagles triumphed over the Chicago Cardinals in a brutal 7–0 game that featured heavy snowfall. As the defending champions the Eagles were invited to the College All-Star Game and on August 22, 1949, Szymanski won his second such game, this time from the professional side of the ball. In his final season Szymanski recorded two more fumble recoveries while playing for the Chicago Bears in 1949.

== Move to the court ==
While playing for the Detroit Lions Szymanski attended Detroit Law School at night. After his NFL career he practiced privately for a number of years before being appointed auditor general of Michigan by Governor G. Mennen Williams in 1956. In 1959 Szymanski was elected probate judge in Wayne County. He served at that post until his death in 1987.

== Recognition ==
In 1995 Szymanski was inducted into the National Polish-American Sports Hall of Fame for his impressive career. Szymanski was also named a member of the Wall Street Journal Law Blog Football Hall of Fame for his combined career of football prowess and legal stature. He received by far the most votes of any inductee, partially due to a campaign launched by his sons.

== Humor ==
In the 1940s Szymanski was called as a witness during a civil suit in South Bend. After the judge asked him how good of a center he was Szymanski thought for a bit and replied, "Sir, I'm the best center Notre Dame has ever had." A surprised Frank Leahy later asked the usually modest Szymanski why he had made such a statement. "I hated to do it," he said. "But, after all, I was under oath." This story about Szymanski was included in the first Chicken Soup for the Soul book.
