= John Wroblewski =

American ice hockey player and coach

- Born: May 26, 1981 (age 45) Neenah, Wisconsin, U.S.
- Height: 6 ft 1 in (185 cm)
- Weight: 212 lb (96 kg; 15 st 2 lb)
- Position: Right wing
- Shot: Right
- Played for: Fresno Falcons (ECHL)
- Coached for: Ontario Reign; United States women's national ice hockey team
- NHL draft: Undrafted
- Playing career: 2003–2007
- Coaching career: 2020–present

John Ellsworth Wroblewski (born May 26, 1981) is an American former ice hockey player. He is currently the head coach of the United States women's national ice hockey team and led them to the Olympic gold medal in the 2026 Olympics. He is the former head coach of the USA Hockey National Team Development Program and Ontario Reign of the American Hockey League.

== Coaching career ==
On August 3, 2011, the Gwinnett Gladiators announced that Wroblewski, the former assistant coach for the Wheeling Nailers, had been selected to take over from Jeff Pyle as the team's head coach. After two successful seasons in Gwinnett, Wroblewski joined the Rochester Americans of the American Hockey League (AHL) as an assistant coach. After another two seasons, he was fired as part of a coaching overhaul by the Amerks' owners, the Buffalo Sabres.

On August 17, 2020, the Los Angeles Kings named Wroblewski the new head coach of the AHL's Ontario Reign. On May 31, 2022, Wroblewski was named the head coach of the United States women's national ice hockey team for the 2022 IIHF Women's World Championship. Wroblewski continued to coach the US national women's team in the 2026 Winter Olympics in Milan, Italy, where the team won gold in a match against Canada. On June 18, 2026, Wroblewski received the National Polish-American Sports Hall of Fame Excellence in Sports Award for coaching Team USA's Women's Hockey squad to the 2026 Gold Medal at the Winter Olympic Games in Turin.

== Career statistics ==
			Regular season					Playoffs
Season	Team	League	GP	G	A	Pts	PIM	GP	G	A	Pts	PIM
1999–00	University of Notre Dame	NCAA	30	0	4	4	8	—	—	—	—	—
2000–01	University of Notre Dame	NCAA	36	2	4	6	22	—	—	—	—	—
2001–02	University of Notre Dame	NCAA	38	10	11	21	26	—	—	—	—	—
2002–03	University of Notre Dame	NCAA	40	17	16	33	38	—	—	—	—	—
2003–04	Fresno Falcons	ECHL	72	9	15	24	42	—	—	—	—	—
2004–05	Fresno Falcons	ECHL	57	13	10	23	62	—	—	—	—	—
2005–06	Fresno Falcons	ECHL	72	23	12	35	109	18	4	6	10	39
2006–07	Fresno Falcons	ECHL	72	20	23	43	86	6	3	3	6	2
ECHL totals			273	65	60	125	299	24	7	9	16	41
