= John S. Flizikowski =

American architect

- Image of Flizikowski from a family album, edited from a wedding portrait, June 1903
- Born: Józef Flizikowski; April 19, 1868; Preußisch Stargard, Kreis Preußisch Stargard, Prussia
- Died: July 15, 1934 (aged 66); Chicago, Illinois, US
- Other name: José
- Occupation: Architect
- Political party: GOP
- Spouses: Annie Kowalkowski; Elizabeth Dettlaff
- Children: 5
- Parents: Joseph (father); Anna née Paluchowski (mother)

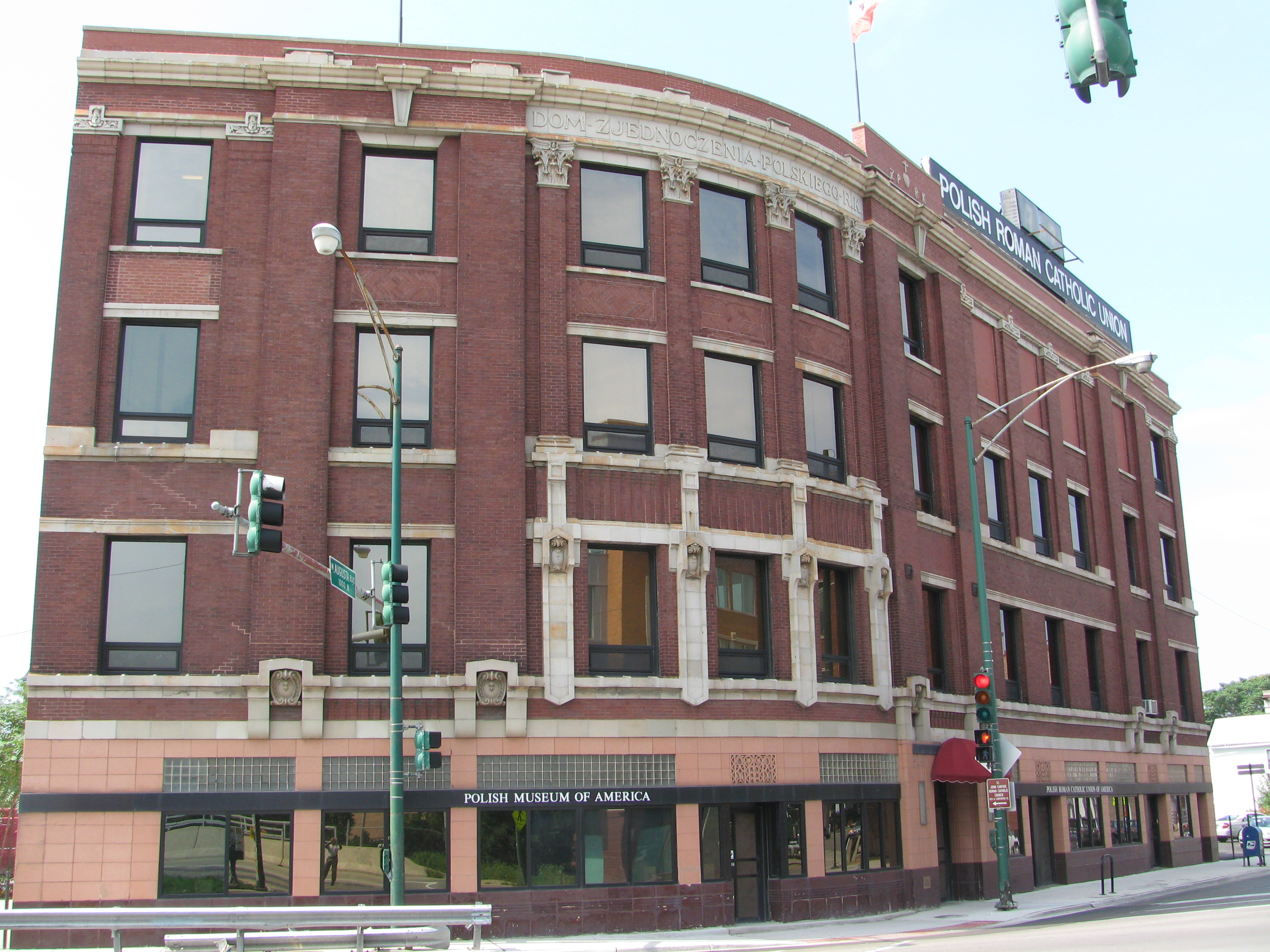
Polish Museum of America

White Eagle Brewing Company in Bridgeport, Chicago

John S. Flizikowski (also known as José; born April 19, 1868, in Preußisch Stargard, West Prussia, now Starogard Gdański, Poland; died July 15, 1934, in Chicago, Illinois) was a notable Chicago architect of residential, church and commercial buildings during the late 19th and early 20th centuries.

== Education and career ==
Flizikowski's parents were Joseph and Anna (Paluchowski) Flizikowski. He was educated at the gymnasium in Stargard and the Art Institute of Cologne, followed by further study at the Technische Hochschule Charlottenburg, graduating in 1891. He moved to the United States in 1893 and settled in Chicago, where he initially worked as a draftsman for eight months before going into business as an architect in 1894. He specialized in houses, churches, and schools.

== Works ==
Among buildings in Chicago designed by Flizikowski were St. Michael’s Lithuanian church, Holy Cross church and parish residence, the Lutheran church on Humboldt and Dickens Avenues, St. Florian School, and the headquarters of the Polish Roman Catholic Union on Division Street.

The Index to the American Contractor's Chicago Building Permit Column, 1898–1912, maintained on the website of The Chicago Historical Society, lists 197 addresses where building permits were issued with John Flizikowski as architect. Among these are the White Eagle Brewing Co. (1911) and Polish Roman Catholic Union of America, home of the Polish Museum of America (1912).

The Chicago Historic Resources Survey (CHRS) of 1995 lists 9 of Flizikowski's buildings that "possess some architectural feature or historical association that made them potentially significant in the context of the surrounding community."

== Personal ==
Flizikowski was a Catholic and a republican. He was married twice to Annie Kowalkowski and to Elizabeth Dettlaff, and had four daughters and one son.
