= Polish Americans =

American citizens of Polish descent

Polscy Amerykanie
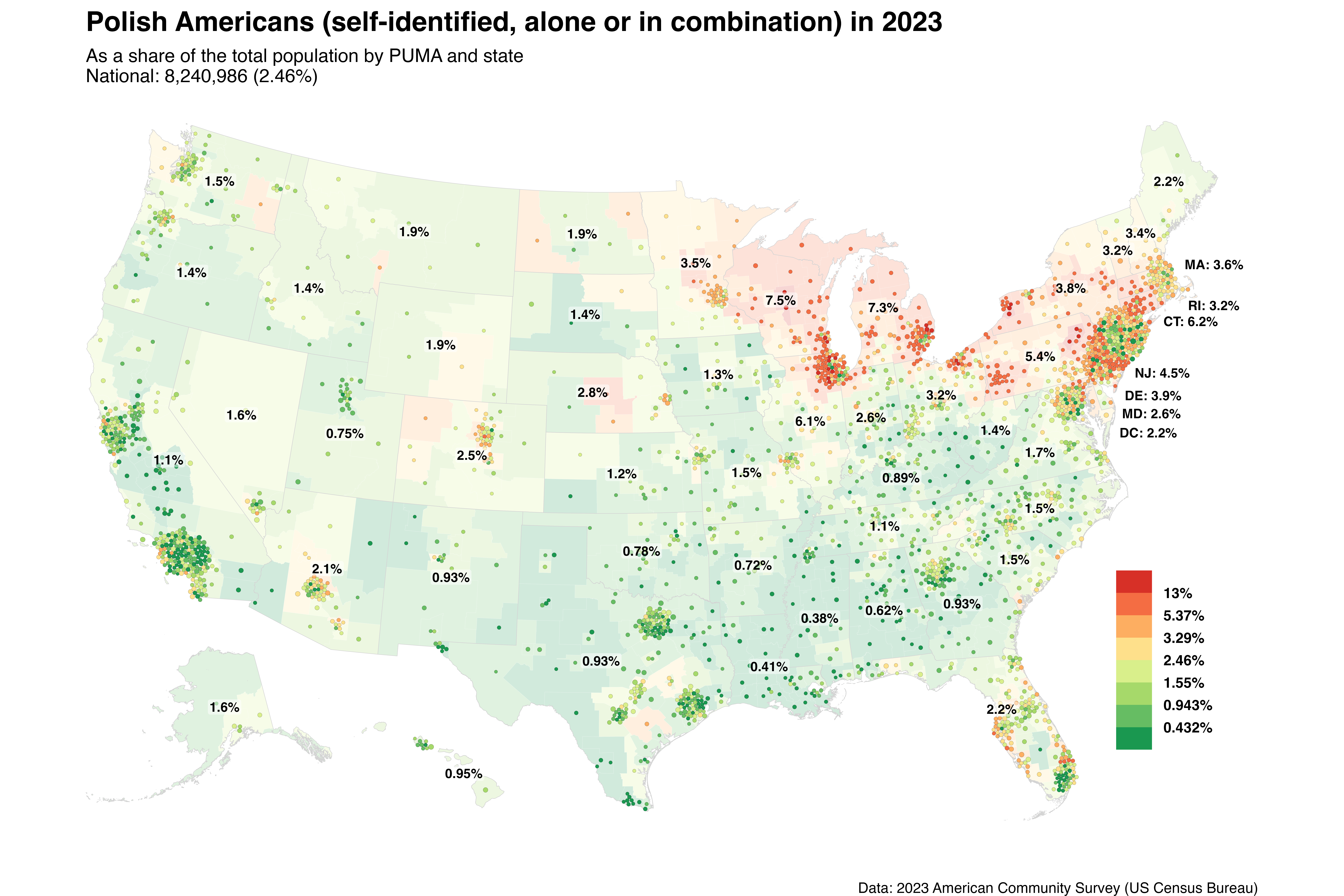
- Americans with Polish ancestry by PUMA and state according to the U.S. Census Bureau's American Community Survey in 2023

Total population
- Alone (one ancestry); 2,755,630 (2020 census); 0.83% of the total US population Alone or in combination 8,599,601 (2020 census); 2.59% of the total US population

Regions with significant populations
- Midwest; Northeast; California; Florida; Texas

Languages
- English (American English dialects); Polish

Religion
- Christianity; Judaism

Related ethnic groups
- Poles; Polish Canadians; Czech Americans; Lithuanian Americans; Slovak Americans; Ukrainian Americans

Polish Americans (Polish: Polscy Amerykanie) are Americans who are of full or partial Polish origin. Polish settlement in the United States started in the mid-19th century. The flow of people has fluctuated over time, depending upon conditions in Poland and the United States. The Polish American population is concentrated around the Great Lakes, New England and the Mid-Atlantic. Illinois, New York, Michigan, Pennsylvania, Minnesota and Florida are the states with the largest populations, though none of them contain more than 15% of the Polish American population.

Poland has a long history of republicanism going back to the establishment of the first national legislature, the Sejm of the Kingdom of Poland, in 1386. This legislature became bicameral in 1493. Poland and Lithuania formed a federated state in 1569 with the establishment of the Polish-Lithuanian Commonwealth. In this commonwealth of two nations there was a joint legislature called the General Sejm. An elective monarchy was started in 1572. Influenced by the Constitution of the United States, the commonwealth enacted a written constitution called the Constitution of 3 May 1791.

In addition to political liberty, Poland has a long tradition of religious liberty. Statutes for the toleration of specific religious groups date to the 13th century. The Compact of Warsaw, which was passed in 1573, codified religious tolerance for the nobility and burghers in the commonwealth. Polish Americans have been very active in religion, particularly Christianity and Judaism.

Polish Americans have demonstrated a strong interest in the sovereignty of Poland. During World War I, notable numbers of Polish Americans joined either the United States Armed Forces or the Blue Army with the goal of re-establishing an independent Poland. The Polish American Congress was established during World War II to advocate in the United States for a sovereign Poland. The congress lobbied successfully for the admission of Poland to the North Atlantic Treaty Organization in 1999.

Polish Americans continue to produce and consume many of the foods from the old country. Festivals centered on food, religion, art, and patriotism are found in many locations throughout the United States. News media is produced in Polish and/or English. There are several museums as well.

== Demographics ==
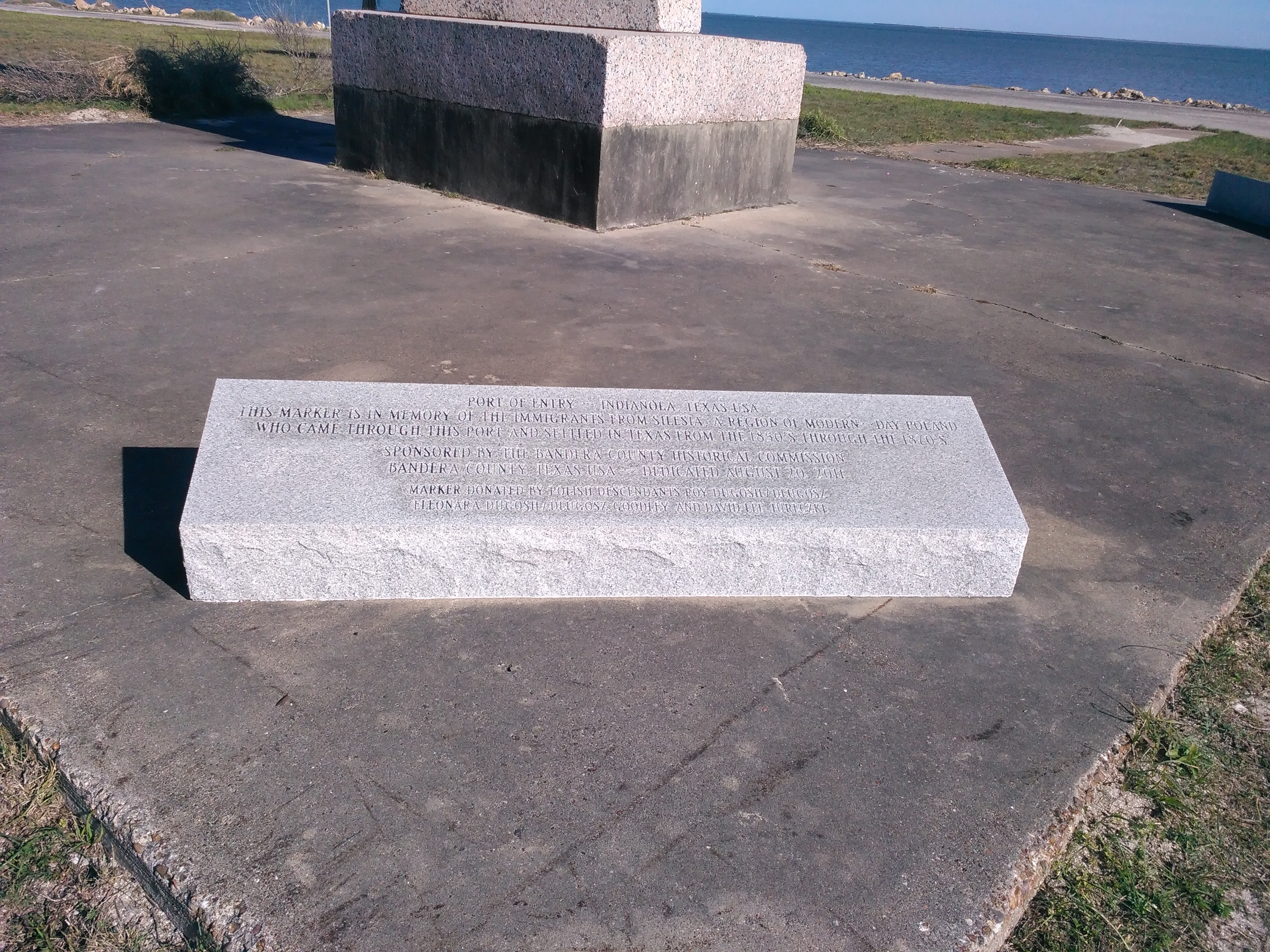
Marker of immigration from Silesia into Texas, located in Indianola, Texas

A small number of Poles emigrated to North America during the colonial period. The Jamestown Polish craftsmen, who arrived in the Virginia Colony as early as 1608, were the most well known settlers. Soon after the establishment of the United States, Poland lost its independence through a process known as the Partitions of Poland. Polish people and land were divided into zones ruled by the Kingdom of Prussia, the Habsburg monarchy, and the Russian Empire. There were several attempts to re-establish Polish sovereignty. One such attempt was the Greater Poland Uprising, which was part of the wave of uprisings in Europe known as the Revolutions of 1848. In 1854 some Poles from Prussia decided to leave for the United States where they established the first Polish settlement in Panna Maria, Texas. The movement of Poles to the United States surged to more than 2 million over the remainder of the 19th century and into the beginning of the 20th century as economic and cultural pressures in Prussia, Austria, and Russia increased. At the same time the United States enjoyed a period of economic growth and prosperity known as the Gilded Age. Many of these Poles were temporary economic migrants who worked for several years in the United States before returning home with their savings. This first wave of immigration ended with World War I and the subsequent establishment of the Second Polish Republic in 1918.

After World War II the United States government passed the Displaced Persons Act in 1948 and the Refugee Relief Act in 1953. These laws allowed for the admission of war refugees into the United States. A U.S. Senate report estimated that there were 233,300 displaced persons of Polish origin living in other European countries. The American Committee for Resettlement of Polish Displaced Persons was created to facilitate the resettlement of the majority of these displaced persons.

The economic distress from the collapse of the Polish People's Republic in 1989 created another wave of Polish emigration to the United States.

=== 2020 Census ===
Number of Polish Americans (self-reported) as per U.S. Census
Year	Number
1900	1,903,000
1970	5,105,000
1980	8,228,037
1990	9,366,106
2000	8,977,444
2010	9,569,207
2020	8,599,601

The United States Census Bureau published an infographic in 2023 entitled Detailed Races and Ethnicities in the United States and Puerto Rico: 2020 Census. This data source showed that the number of Americans in 2020 who cited their ethnic group as Polish was 2,686,362 alone and 8,599,601 alone or in any combination. The proportion of the former to the latter was 31.2%, thus indicating that a substantial majority were of mixed origin. The adjacent table shows the Polish American population going back to 1900.

While the Polish American population is dispersed across the union, there are four states of note. Illinois has the largest population both for the alone and combination categories. The alone population of 352,882 equaled 13.1% of the total alone in the United States in 2020. The alone or in any combination figure of 857,583 was equivalent to 10.0% of the national total. Also of note in Illinois is the high concentration of the Polish American population in Cook County. 57.6% of the alone population in the state and 48.0% of the combination population were located in that county in 2020. Other counties with notable numbers were DuPage, Will, and Lake.

New York had the second largest Polish American population in the 2020 Census. The alone category summed to 274,580 while the combination category was 788,624. These figures equaled 10.2% and 9.2% of the national totals respectively. There are two nodes in the state. Erie County had the largest population with 58,949 alone and 147,201 in combination, making it the largest in the state and second largest in the nation. The other node consists of the five contiguous counties of New York, Kings, Queens, Nassau, and Suffolk.

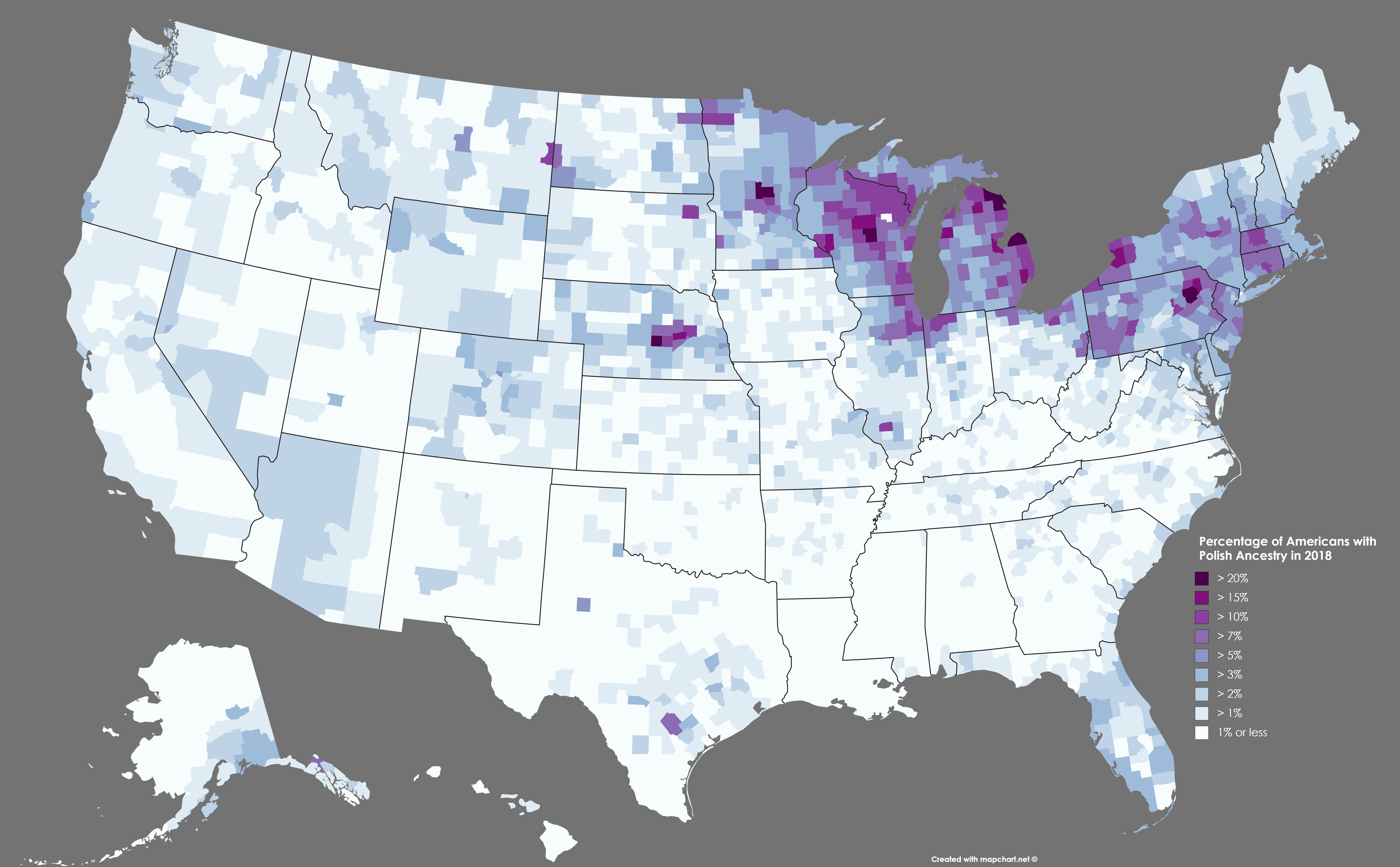
Distribution of Polish Americans by county in 2019

The third highest ranking state is Michigan. Its alone population of 256,398 comprised 9.5% of the national figure in 2020. The combination population of 752,515 was 8.8% of the national total. The population is concentrated in the three contiguous counties of Macomb, Wayne, and Oakland. These three counties were the third, fourth, and fifth largest in the United States respectively. Their populations for both the alone and combination categories were close.

Pennsylvania had the fourth highest ranking population in 2020. Its alone population was 206,264 and its combination total was 710,565. The Polish American population is very dispersed in the commonwealth. Allegheny County had 12.3% of the alone and 14.6% of the combination population in Pennsylvania, lower ratios for the leading county compared to the top three states. Other counties of note were Luzerne, Philadelphia, Bucks, and Montgomery.

Other states with 5% of the total Polish American population in either category were Florida, New Jersey, Wisconsin, Minnesota and California.

=== Polish language ===
Year	Speakers
1910	943,781
1920	1,077,392
1930	965,899
1940	801,680
1960	581,591
1970	419,006
1980	820,647
1990	723,483
2000	649,649
2010	608,333
2019	510,430

The United States Census Bureau began to count language use in its decennial census starting in 1890. In addition, the bureau conducts an annual service called the American Community Survey which began estimating language use in 2005. The most recent publication of language use from this survey is dated 2019. In that year 8 million people over five years old reported Polish as the language spoken at home. The adjacent table gives the historical figures for Polish language use in the United States. The peak year for Polish language in the United States was 1920 when 15 million people reported it as their language spoken at home.

At the state and local level several governments provide language service in Polish. The Illinois Department of Human Services as well as the Illinois Department of Employment Security offer services in the language. The City of Chicago provides language assistance in Polish. In 2022 New York expanded its language access policy for state government services. Polish is one of the languages covered by this law. Local Law 30 of 2017 in New York City designated Polish as one of ten languages guaranteed interpretation and translation services for interaction with the city government.

=== Communities ===
. .

- Illinois: Chicago
- Maryland: Baltimore
- Michigan: Detroit
- Nebraska: Omaha
- New York: Buffalo, New York City
- Ohio: Cleveland, Toledo
- Pennsylvania: Anthracite Coal Mining Region, Philadelphia, Pittsburgh
- Texas: Central, South
- Wisconsin: Milwaukee, Stevens Point

== Religion ==
Christianity and Judaism are the most common religions among Polish Americans. However, a small group of Lipka Tatars, originating from the Białystok region, founded the Powers Street Mosque in Brooklyn in 1907.

=== Christianity ===
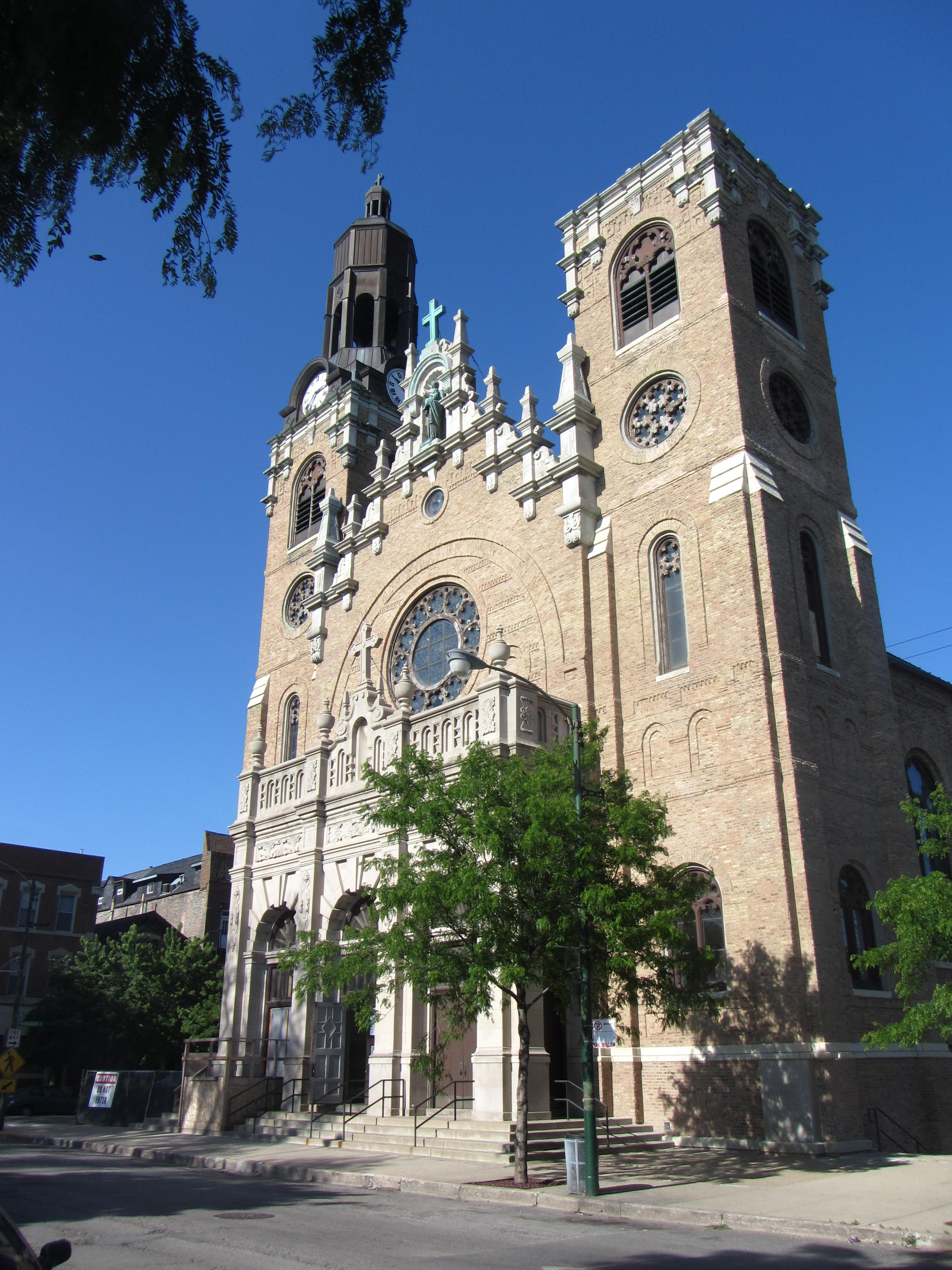
St. Stanislaus Kostka Church in Chicago, Illinois, the city's first Polish parish

The Central Archives of American Polonia is a research center at the Orchard Lake Schools. The archives compiles data about the history of Christianity among Polish Americans. Its General List of Polish Parishes counts 1.036 Roman Catholic parishes of a Polish character that were established over the history of the United States. A portion of these parishes are no longer active. The first parish, Immaculate Conception, was established in Panna Maria, Texas in 1854. The dioceses with the largest concentration are the Archdiocese of Chicago at 64, the Diocese of Buffalo at 50, the Diocese of Scranton at 49, and the Archdiocese of Detroit at 40. The Polish Roman Catholic Union of America was instrumental in establishing many churches in the dioceses of Chicago, Detroit, and Buffalo. The monumental scale of some of these urban churches led to the creation of a new genre of architecture known as Polish cathedral style. Parishes were established in rural areas such as farming communities and mining towns as well. The General List of Polish Parishes indicates that 177 parishes were established in Pennsylvania, 122 in New York, 118 in Michigan, 112 in Wisconsin, and 99 in Illinois.

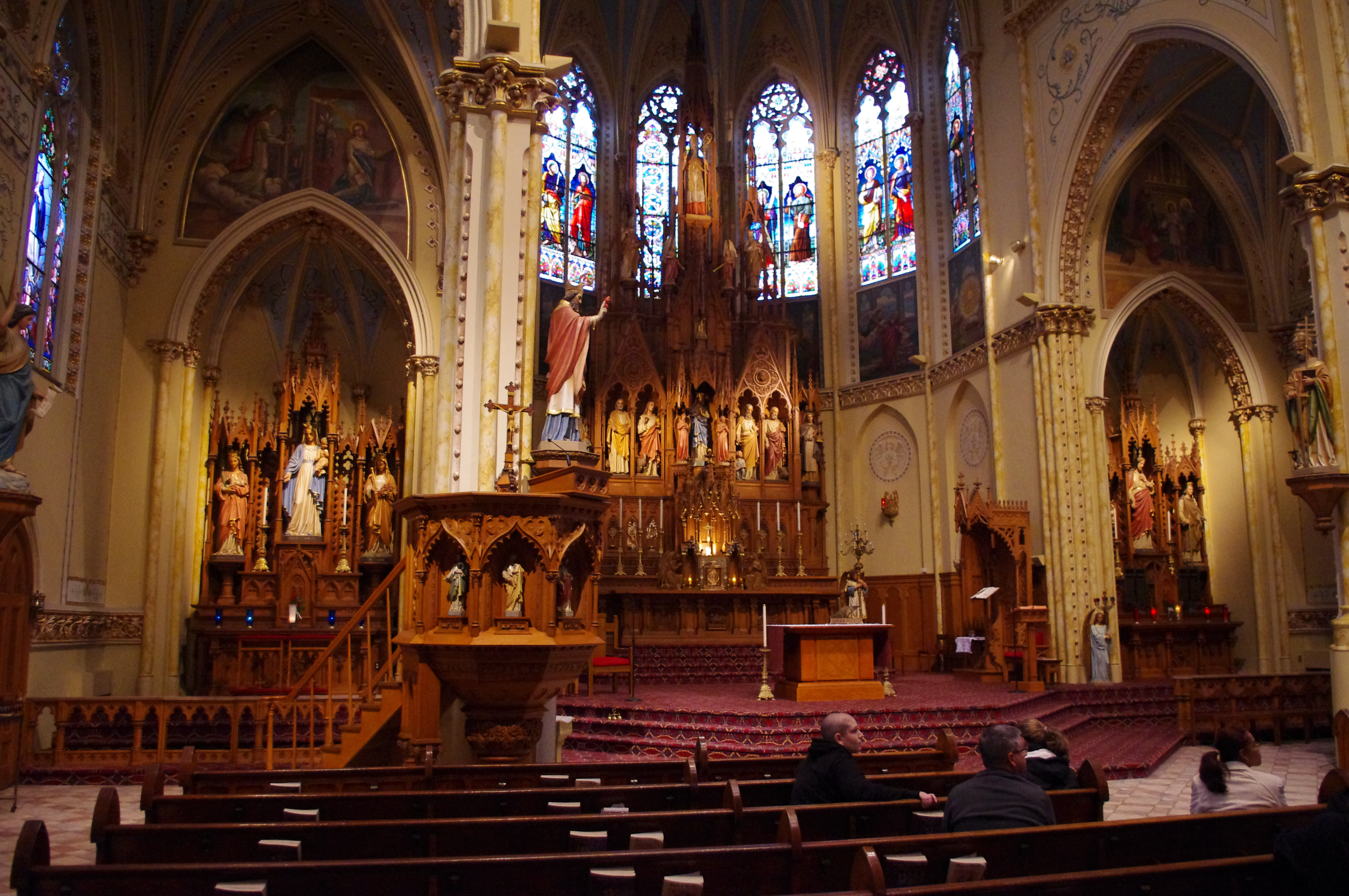
Inside view of St. Stanislaus Church in Slavic Village in Cleveland, Ohio

The General List of Polish Parishes shows that the most common names for the parishes established were Polish saints such as St. Stanislaus, St. Casimir, St. Stanislaus Kostka, and St. Adalbert. Also common were Sacred Heart and St. Joseph. However, the most popular was St. Mary including as Our Lady of Czestochowa. Devotion to this form of St. Mary was confirmed by the opening of The National Shrine of Our Lady of Czestochowa in 1955. This shrine in Pennsylvania proved so popular that a larger facility was built in 1966. Several statesmen and bishops have visited including Pope John Paul II.

The Order of Saint Paul the First Hermit, also known as the Pauline Fathers and Brothers, operates the National Shrine of Our Lady of Czestochowa. In addition, the monastic order serves several other parishes, primarily in New York. Another religious order for men present in the United States is the Congregation of the Resurrection of Our Lord Jesus Christ, more commonly known as the Resurrectionists. As of 2025, the order is stationed at 21 parishes and universities, mostly in Illinois and California. There is a related order for women known as the Sisters of the Resurrection of Our Lord Jesus Christ. There are two orders of note in the Franciscan tradition as well. The Felician Sisters arrived in the United States in 1874. Their expansive ministry encompasses education, health care, and social services. The order founded and sponsors three institutions of higher education: Felician University, Madonna University, and Villa Maria College. The Order of Friars Minor Conventual, generally known as the Conventual Franciscan Friars, founded and operate the National Shrine of St. Maximilian Kolbe in Illinois. In addition, the order serves the Basilica of St. Josaphat, the third church designated a basilica in the United States.

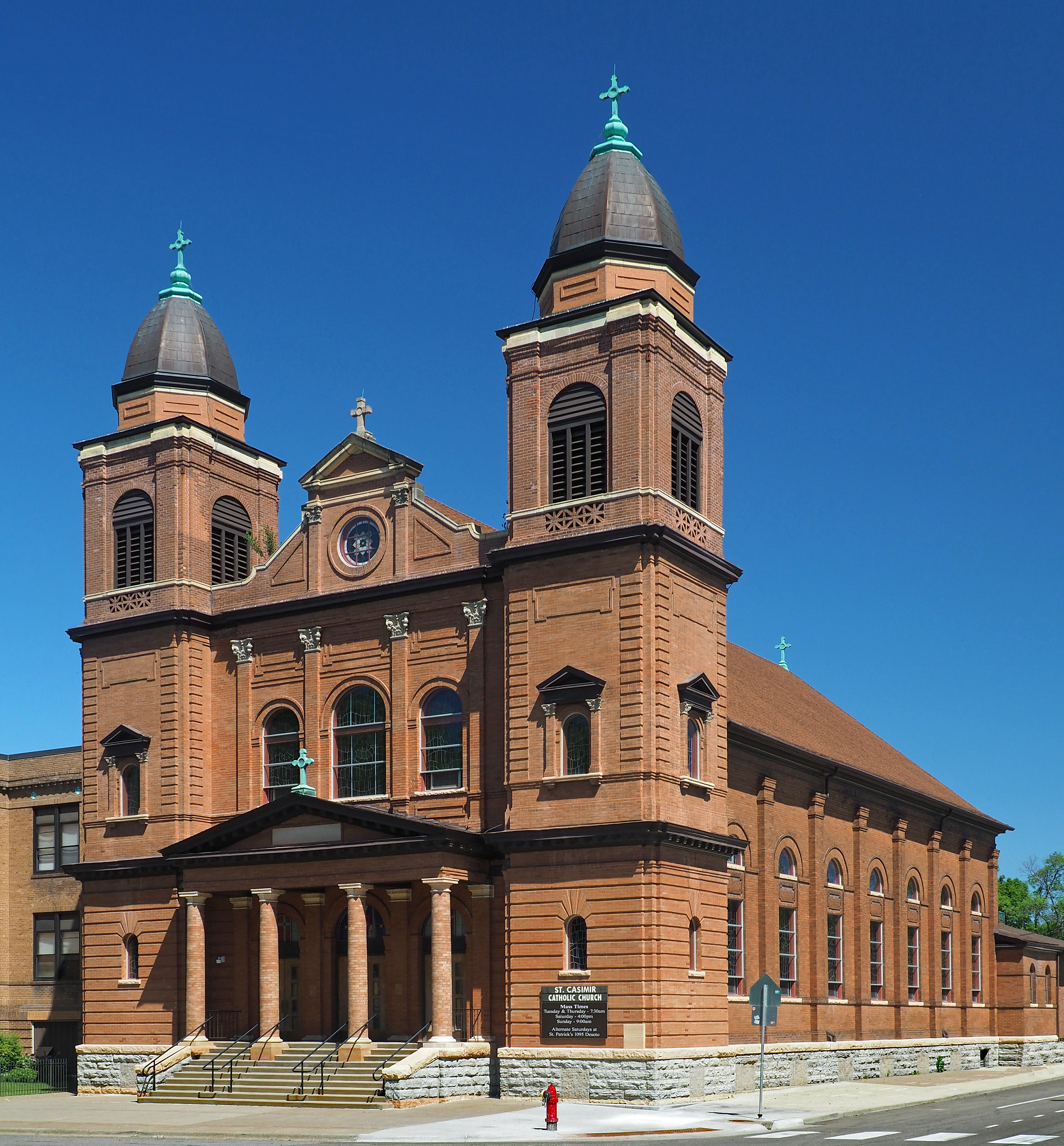
Church of St. Casimir in Saint Paul, Minnesota, built in 1904

In Michigan the Orchard Lake Schools were established in 1885. One of the schools was the SS. Cyril & Methodius Seminary which trained foreign-born priests for ministry to Polish-speaking Catholics in the United States. The seminary operated from 1885 to 2022. The Archdiocese of Chicago offers Polish language services through its Polonia ministry. As of 2025 there are 37 parishes in the diocese which offer masses in the Polish language and 38 schools which offer religious education in Polish.

Customs around the liturgical year remain common among Polish Americans. Wigilia is practiced at Christmas Eve while swieconka is performed at churches on Holy Saturday.

Though the majority of Polish Americans remain loyal to the Catholic Church, a breakaway church called the Polish National Catholic Church was founded in 1897. At that time Polish parishioners in Scranton believed that church leadership, then dominated by Irish bishops and priests, was lacking in Polish representation. At the beginning of 2025 the church consisted of 108 parishes of which 27 are in Pennsylvania and 13 are in New York.

=== Judaism ===
World Agudath Israel was formed in Poland in 1912 by Jews who disagreed with the secular orientation of Zionism. Agudath Israel of America, also known as Agudas Yisroel or Agudah, was established in 1922. This organization advocates for Orthodox Jews at all levels of government in the United States. It also provides social, educational, and youth services.

== Government ==
When drafting the Constitution of the United States, Thomas Jefferson was inspired by the religious tolerance of the Warsaw Confederation.

The Congressional Poland Caucus is a congressional membership organization. The caucus advocates for stronger U.S.-Poland relations around shared values and economic ties.

Polish-Americans founded the Polish American Congress (PAC) in 1944 to support a free and sovereign Poland at the end of World War II. In 1948 it successfully lobbied the U.S. government to admit 140,000 Polish displaced persons, war victims, and veterans to the United States. During the communist era the congress organized humanitarian efforts to Poland. PAC encouraged the passage of the Support East European Democracy Act of 1989 which committed $800 million to Poland. The congress urged the admission of Poland into NATO which happened in 1999. The federation comprises six national membership organizations as of 2025: Polish Daily News, American Council for Polish Culture, Polish Army Veterans Association of America, Polish Falcons of America, Polish National Alliance, and Polish Roman Catholic Union of America.

== Military ==
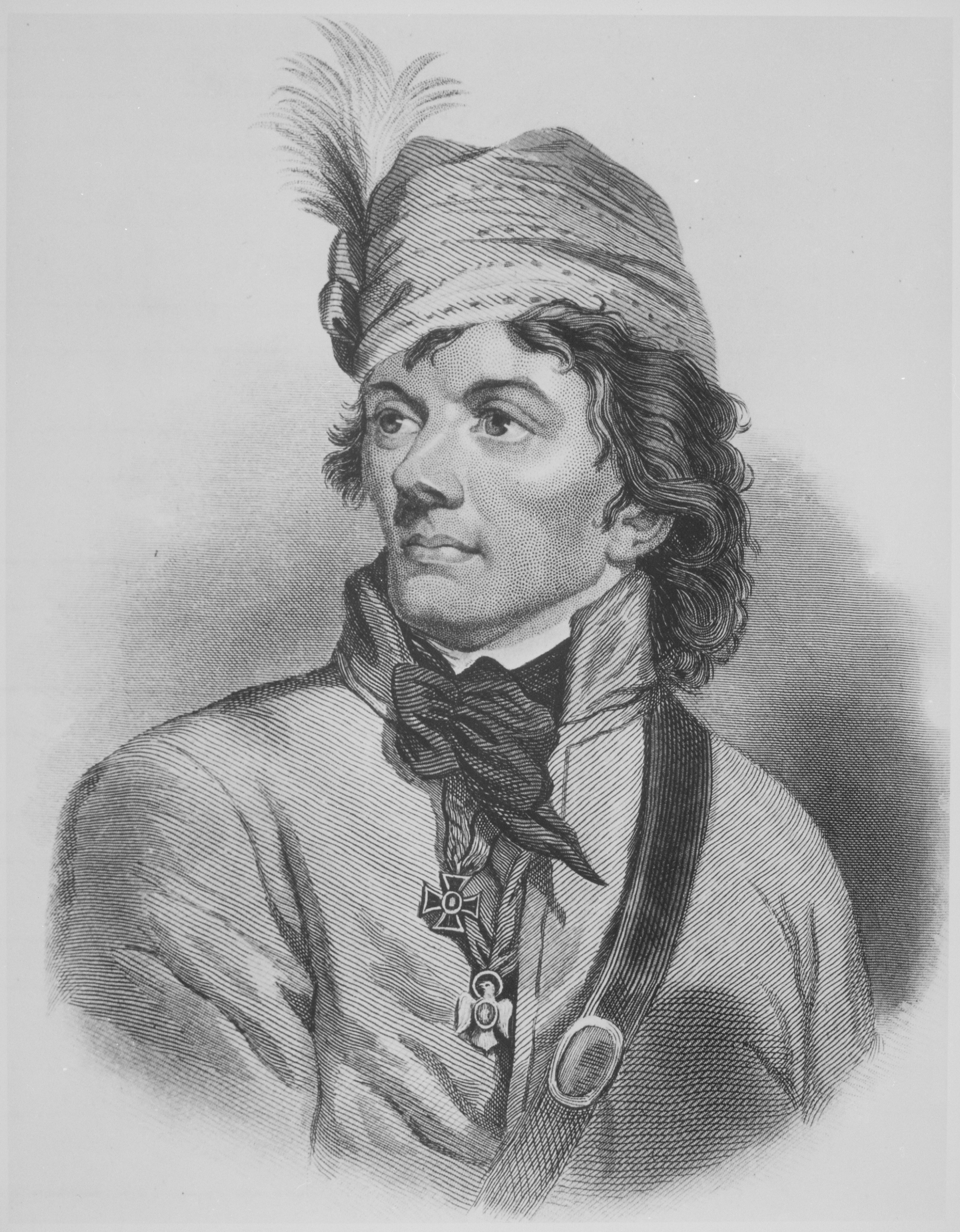
Tadeusz Kościuszko

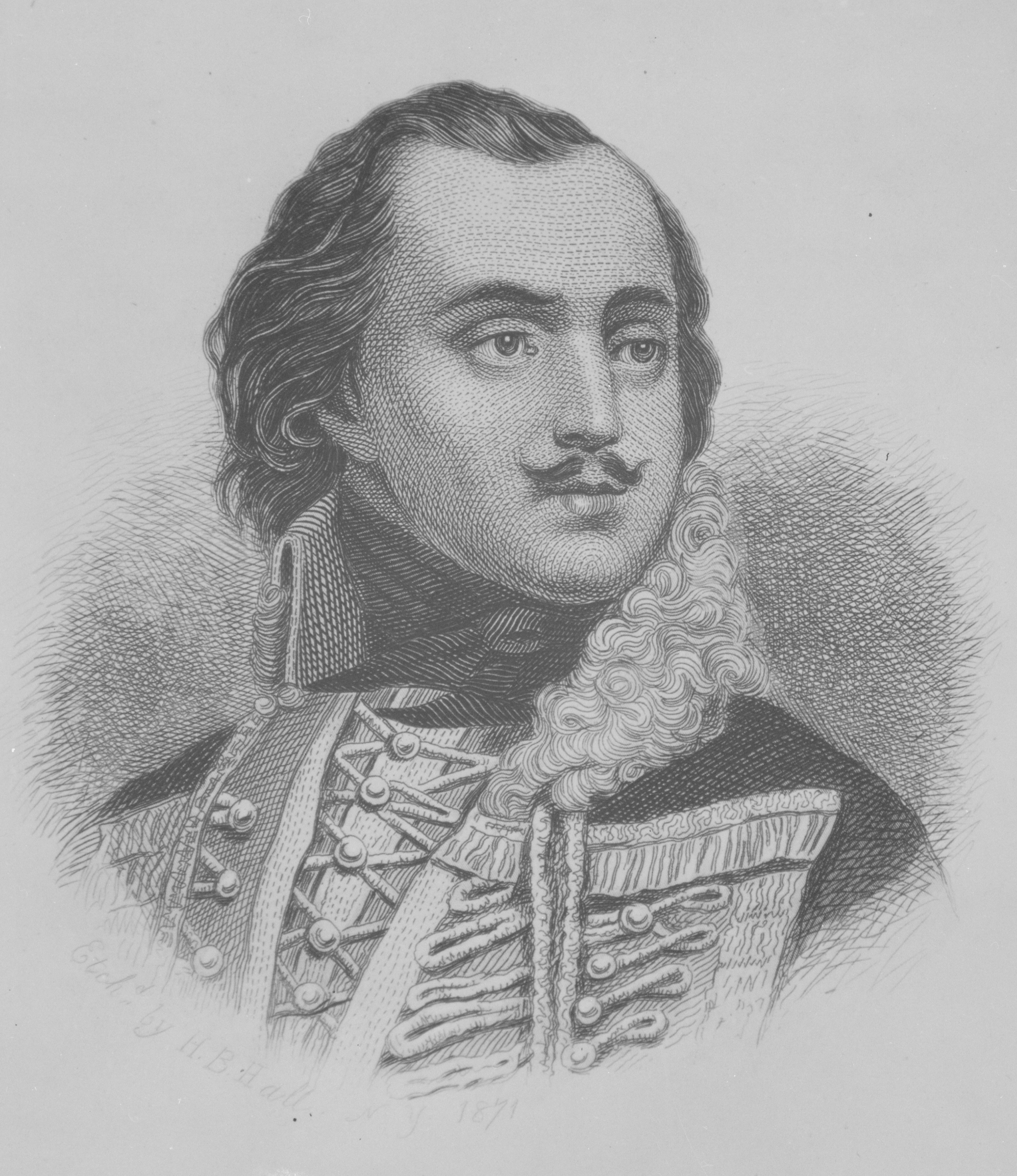
Kazimierz Pułaski

Two Polish volunteers, Casimir Pulaski and Tadeusz Kościuszko, served in the Continental Army during the American Revolutionary War. Casimir Pulaski created and led the Pulaski's Legion of cavalry. He was mortally wounded at the Siege of Savannah. Fort Pulaski is named in his honor. Tadeusz Kosciuszko designed and oversaw the construction of state-of-the-art fortifications, including those at West Point. He returned to the United States in 1797 and lived in Philadelphia. His former residence in that city is designated the Thaddeus Kosciuszko National Memorial and is the smallest unit in the U.S. National Park system. The National Monument Audit is an inventory of public monuments in the United States. It counts 51 monuments of Pulaski and 22 of Kosciuszko.

During the American Civil War the 58th New York Infantry Regiment was known as the Polish Legion.

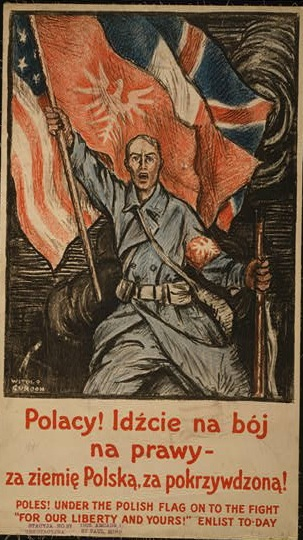
Polish American recruitment WWI

Polish Americans who served in the United States Armed Forces during World War I created three different veterans associations after the war. These associations merged in 1931 to form the Polish Legion of American Veterans. Polish Americans who served in the Blue Army during World War I created the Polish Army Veterans Association of America in 1921. Many of the soldiers in the Blue Army, also known as Haller's Army, were members of the Polish Falcons of America. Poland regained its independence in 1918 and the Blue Army merged into the Polish Land Forces.

After the end of the Cold War, the National Guard created the State Partnership Program. The Illinois National Guard has been partnered with the Polish Armed Forces since 1993. The United States Navy commissioned Naval Support Facility Redzikowo in 2020. This facility supports the Aegis Ashore missile defense system, which NATO announced as operational in 2024. In 2023 the United States Army established its eighth garrison in Europe and first in Poland. U.S. Army Garrison Poland is headquartered at Camp Kosciuszko.

== Benefit Societies ==
Fraternal benefit societies are mutual insurance companies whose profits are devoted to a specific social mission. The American Fraternal Alliance is the umbrella organization for benefit societies in the United States and Canada. There are several societies with a Polish American characteristic. The oldest is the Polish Roman Catholic Union of America, also known as PRCUA Life, which was founded in 1873. As its name indicates, its original mission was to build Roman Catholic churches and schools with an emphasis on Polish traditions. The Polish National Alliance of the United States of North America, often referred to as the PNA or Alliance, was established in 1880. It was founded to promote Polish independence and to integrate Polish immigrants into the civic culture of the United States. Today both organizations offer scholarships and operate Polish language and dance schools. Another benefit society is the Polish Falcons of America. This organization was started in 1887 but did not become a fraternal benefit society until 1928. It emphasizes physical fitness and Polish patriotism due to its heritage in the Sokol movement.

First Catholic Slovak Ladies Association, also known as FCSLA Life, is a benefit society focused on Catholic values and Slavic traditions that was founded in 1892. It purchased both the Polish Union of U.S.A and the Polish Women's Alliance of America in 2017. Catholic Financial Life is an amalgamation of many benefit societies. In 2017 it merged with Degree of Honor Protective Association which had purchased the Polish White Eagle Association in 2001. The Knights of Columbus, which was established in 1882 to unite Catholic men and to help families of the deceased, expanded into Poland in 2006.

== Culture ==
American Council for Polish Culture is an alliance of Polish American clubs, associations, and institutes that was established in 1948. The council is focused on promoting Polish culture, history, and traditions. There are 42 affiliate and supporting organizations as of 2025.

=== Cuisine ===
Kiełbasa is commonly marketed in the United States as Polish sausage. It comes in fresh and smoked varieties. In Chicago the sausage is the meat in the sandwich known as Maxwell Street Polish. Likewise, in Cleveland there is the Polish Boy.

Polish Jews brought the bagel to the United States. Christians eat pączki doughnuts before Lent. Other baked goods include babka, rugelach, bialy, and placek.

Pierogi are stuffed dumplings that are shared with other Eastern European cuisines. Kluski are another type of dumplings.

Gołąbki and bigos are available sometimes in Polish American communities.

=== Festivals and Holidays ===
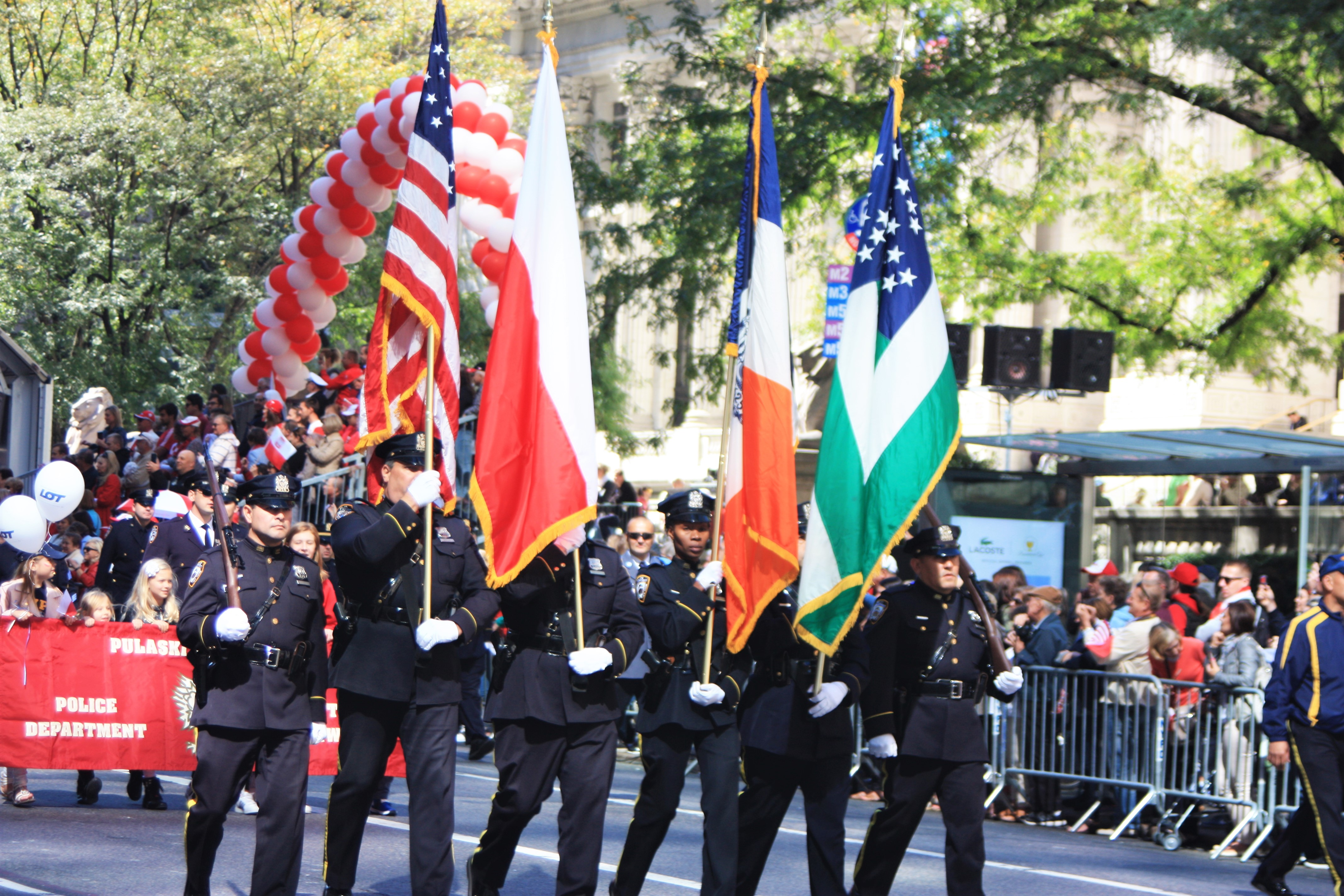
Polish-American parade in New York City, 2017

Polish Fest in Milwaukee claims to be the largest Polish festival in the United States. The festival encompasses food and drink, music and dance, arts and crafts, genealogy, and religion. It occurs in June and was started in 1982. Another festival vying for the title of the largest in the United States is the Taste of Polonia festival in Chicago. This festival includes food and beverage, music and dance, gambling, and carnival rides. It began in 1980 and is held every Labor Day weekend. Just east of Chicago in Whiting, Indiana there is Pierogi Fest. This annual food festival for Eastern European cuisine was first held in 1993. One of the oldest cultural festivals, dating back to 1954, is the Syracuse Polish Festival. This festival focuses on cuisine and activities for children since the festival raises money for a scholarship fund. The Polish Festival in Portland, Oregon began in 1993.

Easter Monday is Dyngus Day. This ancient holiday has been celebrated in South Bend since the 1950s. The largest celebration occurs in the Buffalo metropolitan area. There is a parade, a run, music, folk dancers, food, and drink in the historic Polonia neighborhood as well as other venues in the city and its suburbs. The National Shrine of Our Lady of Czestochowa holds its Polish American Festival & Country Fair near the feast day of its patroness at the end of August. This five-day celebration of culture and tradition was started in 1966.

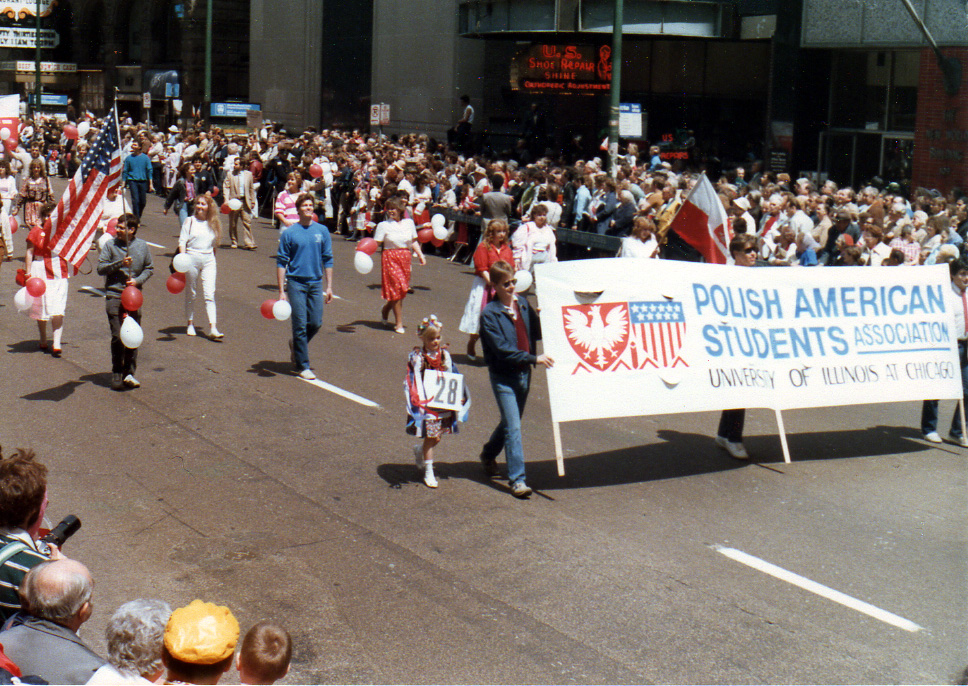
Polish Constitution Day Parade in Chicago, 1985

The Seattle Polish Film Festival was founded in 1992 and is organized by the Seattle-Gdynia Sister City Association. Another film festival is the New York Polish Film Festival which was started in 2005.

Constitution Day is a holiday that remembers the Constitution of 3 May 1791. This agreement codified the constitutional dual monarchy of the Polish-Lithuanian Commonwealth. After the collapse of Poland it became a rallying cry for the restoration of sovereignty. It became an official holiday in Poland in 1919 after the establishment of the Second Polish Republic. However, the holiday was banned by Nazi and Soviet occupiers during World War II and by the Polish People's Republic. It was restored as a holiday in 1990 after the end of communism. In the United States the oldest and largest celebration is the parade in Chicago which was started in 1891.

=== Media ===
Polvision is a Polish language television station that was founded in 1987. It broadcasts throughout the Chicago metropolitan area. Dziennik Związkowy, also known as Polish Daily News, is a Polish language newspaper in Chicago that was started in 1908. Another Polish language newspaper is Nowy Dziennik. It serves the New York City metropolitan area and was first published in 1971. A bi-lingual news publication is Tygodnik Polski/The Polish Weekly which continues the tradition of a newspaper founded in 1904 in Detroit. A digital bi-lingual news portal is the Polish News Online which began in 1997. The Polish American Journal was started in 1911 and switched to printing only in English in 1948. Am-Pol Eagle is an English language newspaper that was first published in 1960. It serves the Buffalo metropolitan area.

Hippocrene Books is a publishing house with a specialty in Polish-interest books. Ohio University Press has published 19 books in its Polish and Polish-American Studies Series.

=== Sports ===
The U.S. Open Cup is the national championship for soccer. It was started in 1914. Two Polish American teams have won the championship: Chicago Falcons in 1953 and A.A.C. Eagles in 1990.

The National Polish-American Sports Hall of Fame was founded in 1973 to recognize competitors in the field of sports. The majority of the inductees have been in baseball and American football.

=== Architecture ===
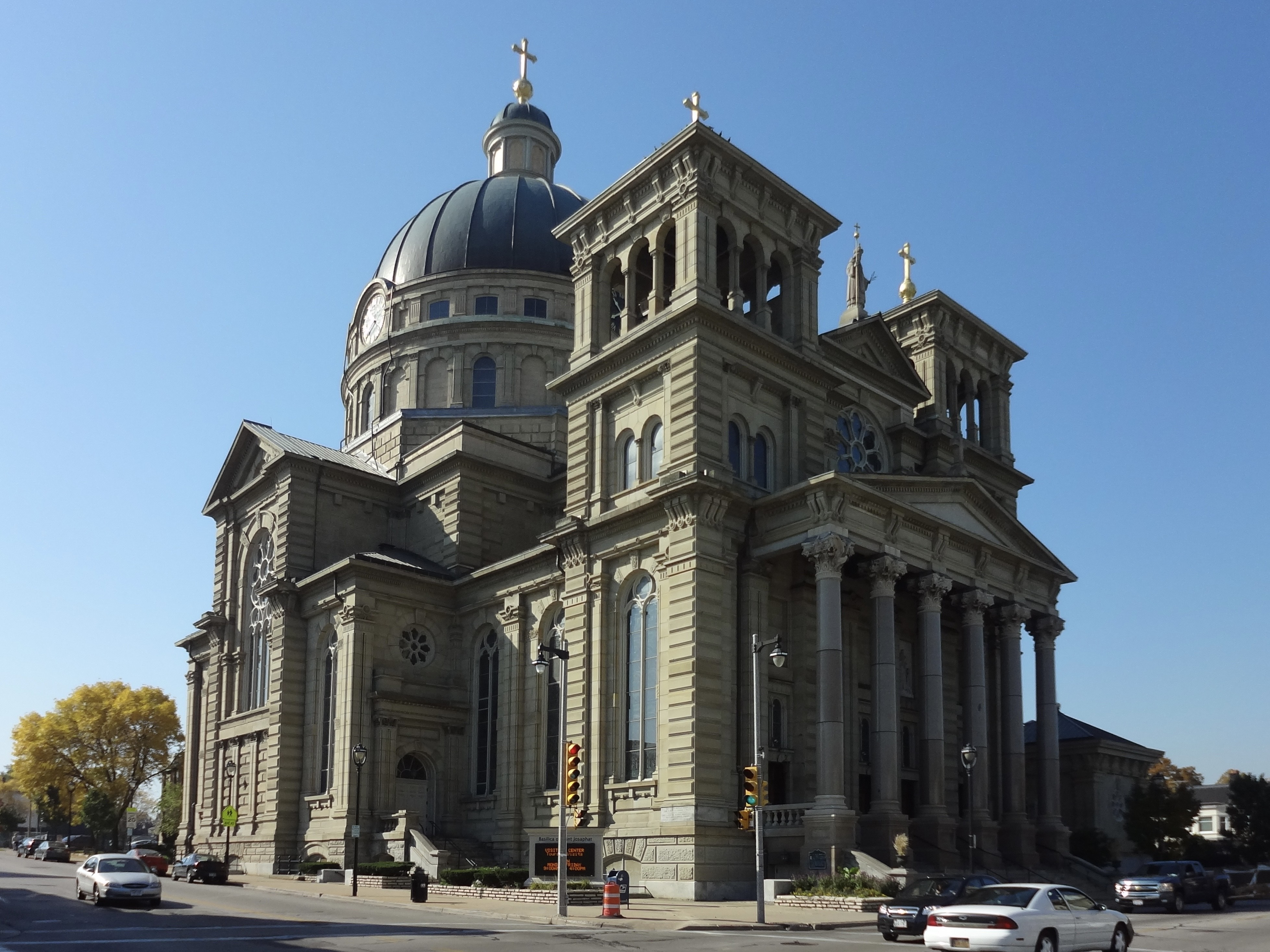
Basilica of St. Josaphat in Milwaukee is an example of the Polish cathedral style of architecture.

Polish cathedral style refers to large churches built by Polish Americans that were equivalent in size to cathedrals but not necessarily cathedrals. These religious buildings were built according to architectural styles from different periods in Poland's history. This method of architecture is known as historicism. The largest number of examples of these churches are found in Chicago and Detroit.

In Milwaukee raised cottages are called Polish flats.

Polish settlers in Texas built houses with high-pitched roofs. The shaded veranda that was created by these roofs was a popular living space for the settlers. According to oral histories recorded from descendants, the verandas were used for "almost all daily activities from preparing meals to dressing animal hides." The first house built by a Pole in Texas is the John Gawlik House which was constructed in 1858. The house is located in the central historic district of Panna Maria.

=== Museums and Archives ===
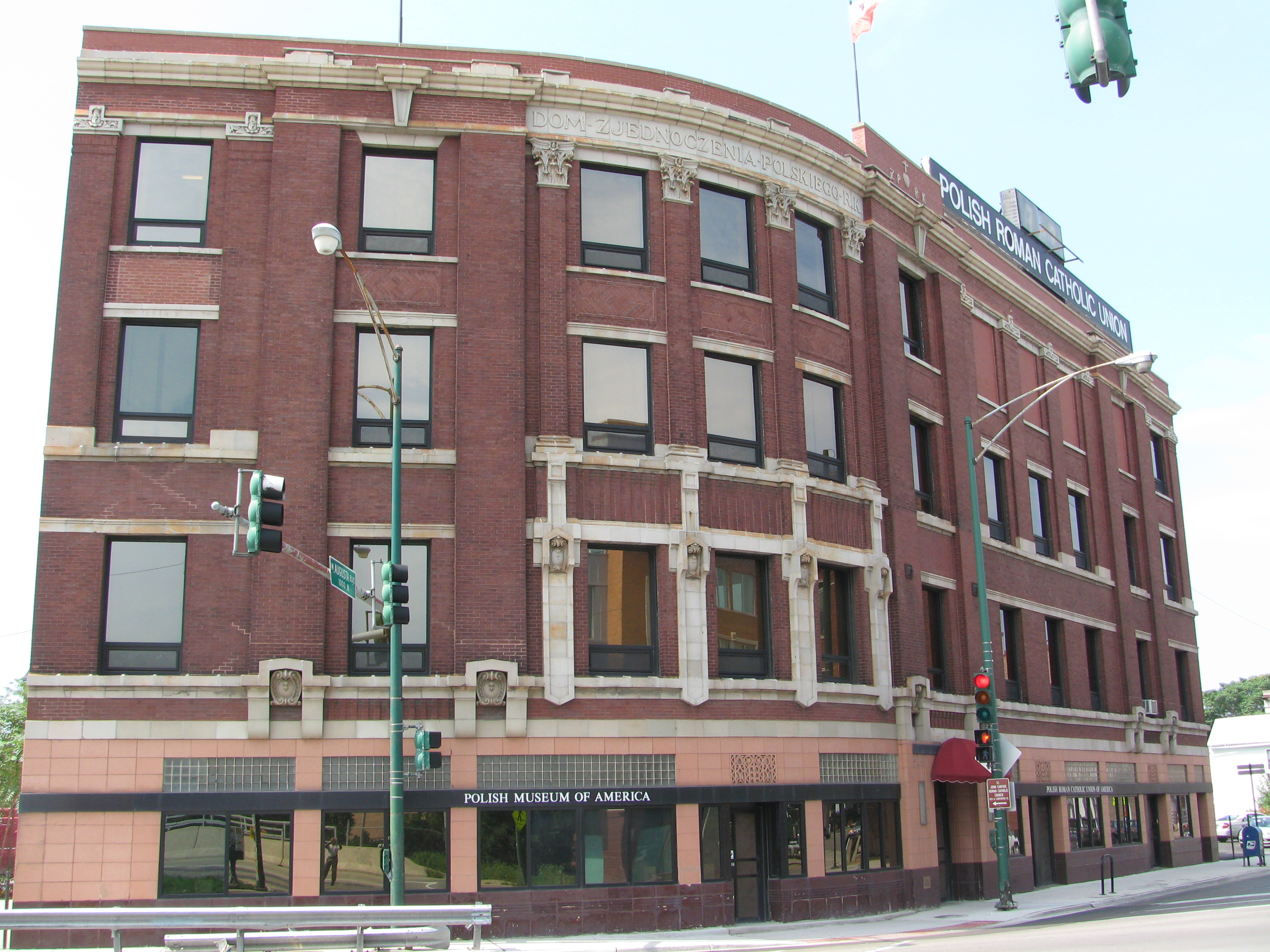
The Polish Museum of America in Chicago

The Polish Museum of America in Chicago's Polish Downtown was founded in 1935. It consists of a museum of Polish and Polish American artifacts, a library of books in both Polish and English, and an archives. The Polish Roman Catholic Union of America started the PMA and continues to sponsor it. Another sponsor is the Ministry of Culture and National Heritage of the Republic of Poland. The Polish American Museum was established in 1977 and is located in Port Washington, New York. This museum focuses on military artifacts and folk art as its two partners are the Center for Military Studies and the Polish Art Center. The Polish American Cultural Center, which is located in Philadelphia, is a museum of Polish history and culture.

The Polish Heritage Center at Panna Maria is a museum dedicated to the first and oldest permanent Polish settlement in the United States. This visitor center is located in the Panna Maria Historic District in Texas. A fifth museum of note is the Kashubian Cultural Institute & Polish Museum located in Winona, Minnesota. Kashubians are a regional sub-culture from Poland who settled in Wisconsin and Minnesota. The museum was established in 1979.

The Polish Music Center is an institute at the USC Thornton School of Music. It consists of a library and archives dedicated to classical music and folk dances from Poland. Cooperation with the Polish State Archives started in 2013. Furthermore, the institute hosts concerts and initiated the annual Paderewski Festival in Paso Robles, California.

== See also ==
- History of Poles in the United States
- Kashubian Americans
- Poland–United States relations
- Polish-American Vote
- Polish Canadians
- Polish diaspora
- Polish people

=== Lists ===
- Category:American politicians of Polish descent
- List of place names of Polish origin in the United States
- List of Polish Americans
