= National Polish-American Sports Hall of Fame =

Sports hall of fame

The National Polish-American Sports Hall of Fame and Museum was founded in 1973. The mission of the National Polish-American Sports Hall of Fame is to recognize and preserve outstanding achievement by individuals of Polish heritage in the field of sports and to educate the entire community with the hope of encouraging and inspiring personal excellence. The hall is located in Troy, Michigan.

Each year, inductees are elected in a nationwide vote among NPASHF officers, Hall of Fame inductees and more than 500 members of the Sports Panel Council. With over 150 inductees, the National Polish-American Sports Hall of Fame has an outstanding collection of historic artifacts on display at the American Polish Cultural Center in Troy, Michigan. Stan Musial, the first inductee, is represented with items worthy of being in Cooperstown. Visitors can also see uniforms worn by greats such as Steve Gromek, Carol Blazejowski, Mark Fidrych and Ed Olczyk; the boxing gloves used by 1940s heavyweight champion Tony Zale; basketballs, baseballs, footballs, and bowling balls used and signed by Mike Krzyzewski, Whitey Kurowski, Ted Marchibroda, and Eddie Lubanski. Among other items is a football signed by Bob Skoronski, Vince Lombardi and other members of the 1967 Super Bowl I Champion Green Bay Packers.

In 2013, the Hall of Fame instituted its NPASHF Excellence in Sports Award and race driver Brad Keselowski was the initial recipient. Other winners include Liz Johnson, Frank Kaminsky, Gary Kubiak, Joe Maddon, Dave Dombrowski, Sam Mikulak, Natalie Wojcik, Paul Juda, Zach Werenski and John Wroblewski.

The Hall of Fame on June 20, 2019, named its inaugural Excellence in Media Award the Tony Kubek Award and Adrian Wojnarowski of ESPN was the inaugural recipient. Sportswriter Joe Posnanski won in 2021, Detroit Red Wings broadcaster Ken Kal in 2024 and FOX Sports producer Pete Macheska in 2025

At the Avenue of Stars, "Aleja Gwiazd Sportowców Polonijnych", of Rzeszów, Poland, bronze plates with handprints of outstanding sportsmen of Polish origin were unveiled July 15, 2023, including NPASHF inductees Bob Brudzinski and Ann Meyers Drysdale.

Celebrating 50 years, the NPASHF hosted a gala banquet with almost two dozen inductees on hand. Ann Meyers Drysdale served as keynote speaker and Jon Paul Morosi as master of ceremonies. The National Polish-American Sports Hall of Fame held its 53rd Annual Induction Banquet on June 18, 2026 in Troy, Michigan. The Class of 2026: NFL Super Bowl Champion Rob Gronkowski, hockey player David Legwand, football standout Bryan Bulaga and basketball's Dave Myers posthumously. Zach Werenski and John Wroblewski were co-recipients of the Excellence in Sports Award.

== Baseball ==
- Oscar Bielaski (2005)
- Stan Coveleski (1976)
- Art "Pinky" Deras (2011)
- Moe Drabowsky (1999)
- Mark Fidrych (2009)
- Steve Gromek (1981)
- Mark Grudzielanek (2019)
- Mark Gubicza (2022)
- Ryan Klesko (2014)
- Ted Kluszewski (1974)
- Jim Konstanty (2008)
- Mike Krukow (2020)
- Tony Kubek (1982)
- Whitey Kurowski (1988)
- Bob Kuzava (2003)
- Eddie Lopat (1978)
- Stan Lopata (1997)
- Greg Luzinski (1989)
- Bill Mazeroski (1979)
- Barney McCosky (1995)
- Stan Musial (1973)
- Joe Niekro (1992)
- Phil Niekro (1990)
- Danny Ozark (2010)
- Tom Paciorek (1992)
- Ron Perranoski (1983)
- A. J. Pierzynski (2020)
- Johnny Podres (2002)
- Jack Quinn (2006)
- Ron Reed (2005)
- Jenny Romatowski (1999)
- Ray Sadecki (2007)
- Al Simmons (1975)
- Bill Skowron (1980)
- Frank Tanana (1996)
- Alan Trammell (1998)
- Connie Wisniewski (2020)
- Carl Yastrzemski (1986)
- Richie Zisk (2004)

== Basketball ==
- Carol Blazejowski (1994)
- Vince Boryla (1984)
- Ann Meyers Drysdale (2016)
- Mike Gminski (2003)
- Tom Gola (1977)
- Bobby Hurley (2006)
- Larry Krystkowiak (2018)
- Mike Krzyzewski (1991)
- Mitch Kupchak (2002)
- Bob Kurland (1996)
- Christian Laettner (2008)
- David Myers (2026)
- June Olkowski (2012)
- John Payak (1982)
- Susan Rojcewicz (2025)
- Juliene Brazinski Simpson (2017)
- Kelly Tripucka (2000)

== Billiards ==
- LoreeJon Ogonowski-Brown (2022)
- Frank Taberski (2020)

== Bowling ==
- Johnny Crimmins (1976)
- Billy Golembiewski (1981)
- Cass Grygier (1984)
- Eddie Lubanski (1978)
- Aleta Rzepecki-Sill (2008)
- Ann Setlock (1983)

== Boxing ==
- Duane Bobick (2014)
- Bobby Czyz (2009)
- Stanley Ketchel (1984)
- Teddy Yarosz (2005)
- Tony Zale (1975)

== Bull Riding ==
- Jonnie Jonckowski (2025)

== Fencing ==
- Janusz Bednarski (2017)

== Figure Skating ==
- Janet Lynn (1990)
- Elaine Zayak (2013)

== American Football ==
- Danny Abramowicz (1992)
- Pete Banaszak (1990)
- Steve Bartkowski (1993)
- Zeke Bratkowski (1995)
- Bob Brudzinski (2005)
- Bryan Bulaga (2026)
- Lou Creekmur (2001)
- Zygmont Czarobski (1980)
- Mark Dantonio (2022)
- Mike Ditka (2001)
- Conrad Dobler (2018)
- Jim Dombrowski (2013)
- Forest Evashevski (2000)
- Frank Gatski (1989)
- Stephen Gostkowski (2025)
- Jim Grabowski (1993)
- Rob Gronkowski (2026)
- Jack Ham (1987)
- Leon Hart (1988)
- Vic Janowicz (1987)
- Ron Jaworski (1991)
- Mike Kenn (2006)
- Joe Klecko (1999)
- Ed Klewicki (1982)
- Gary Kubiak (2017)
- Frank Kush (1998)
- Ted Kwalick (2005)
- Greg Landry (2012)
- Johnny Lujack (1978)
- Ted Marchibroda (1976)
- Chester Marcol (2016)
- Mike McCoy (2019)
- Lou Michaels (1994)
- Walt Michaels (1997)
- Dick Modzelewski (1986)
- Mike Munchak (2003)
- Bronko Nagurski (2020)
- Tom Nowatzke (2008)
- Dominic Olejniczak (2020)
- Bill Osmanski (1977)
- Walt Patulski (2014)
- Frank Piekarski (2005)
- Bill Romanowski (2011)
- Mark Rypien (2006)
- Tom Sestak (2007)
- Bob Skoronski (2000)
- Emil Sitko (2020)
- Hank Stram (1985)
- Dick Szymanski (1994)
- Frank Szymanski (1995)
- Frank Tripucka (1997)
- Steve Wisniewski (2004)
- Alex Wojciechowicz (1975)

== Golf ==
- Billy Burke (2005)
- Betsy King (2000)
- Warren Orlick (1983)
- Bob Toski (1987)
- Al Watrous (1979)
- Evan Williams (2018)

== Gymnastics ==
- George Szypula (1985)

== Ice Hockey ==
- Walter Broda (2005)
- Len Ceglarski (1993)
- Joe Kocur (2016)
- David Legwand (2026)
- Tom Lysiak (2012)
- Allison Mleczko (2019)
- Ed Olczyk (2004)
- Bryan Smolinski (2015)
- Pete Stemkowski (2002)
- Craig Wolanin (2025)

== Lacrosse ==
- John Danowski (2022)

== Motor Sports ==
- Tony Adamowicz (2016)
- Tom D'Eath (2011)
- Alan Kulwicki (2001)

== Skiing ==
- Kristina Koznick (2015)

== Softball ==
- Ed Tyson (1974)

== Sports Journalism ==
- Ed Browalski (1983)
- Billy Packer (1988)

== Sports Officials ==
- Steve Javie (2017)
- Stan Javie (2011)
- Red Mihalik (1996)

== Speed Skating ==
- J.R. Celski (2020)

== Swimming ==
- Rachel Komisarz Baugh (2018)
- Chet Jastremski (2007)
- Kristy Kowal (2010)
- Joe Verdeur (2009)

== Taekwondo ==
- Arlene Limas (2019)

== Tennis ==
- Jane "Peaches" Bartkowicz (2010)
- Frank Parker (1988)

== Track & Field ==
- Bob Gutowski (1980)
- Stella Walsh (1974)
- Frances Sobczak Kaszubski (2020)

== Volleyball ==
- Andy Banachowski (2009)
- Randy Stoklos (2015)

== Water Polo ==
- Monte Nitzkowski (2016)

== Weightlifting ==
- Norbert Schemansky (1979)
- Stanley Stanczyk (1991)

== Wrestling ==
- Władek "Killer" Kowalski (2007)
- Stanley Zbyszko (1983)
- Ivan Putski (2025)

== See also ==
- Polish American Museum
- Polish Museum of America
