= Eddie Lubanski =

American ten-pin bowler (1929–2010)

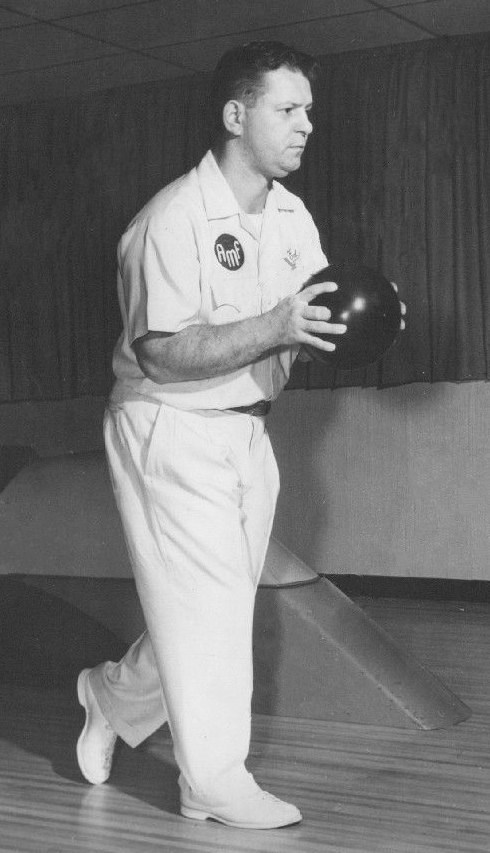
- Lubanski in 1959
- Born: September 3, 1929; Detroit, U.S.
- Died: November 8, 2010 (aged 81); Warren, Michigan, U.S.
- Occupation: Ten-pin bowling

Edward Anthony (Eddie) Lubanski (September 3, 1929 – November 8, 2010) was an American bowler whose achievements were recognized by the Guinness book of World Records in a career that spanned more than four decades. Lubanski was named Bowler of the Year in 1959, when he notably rolled back-to-back 300 games in a mixed doubles exhibition. He had 11 such sanctioned perfect games in his career. His lifetime 204 average stood as the highest in the professional ranks for more than 25 years.

On June 22, 1959, Lubanski made bowling history at the Bowling Palace in Miami, where he became the first professional to record back-to-back 300 games (24 consecutive strikes) in a live televised match. In the second and third games of the three-game series, he was paired with female bowlers Lois Davis and Karyl Weiss, respectively. The rules stipulated that, if the first bowler did not knock down all 10 pins on the first ball, his partner would attempt the pick-up and continue to bowl until said person failed to strike. Because Lubanski struck every time, however, Davis and Weiss never had the opportunity to throw a ball.

The following year, Lubanski (768) teamed with fellow Detroiter Bob Kwolek (814) to establish a world record doubles total of 1,582 pins.

Lubanski later served as bowling instructor and president of the Professional Bowlers Association. He was inducted into the Michigan Sports Hall of Fame, ABC Hall of Fame, Polish American Sports Hall of Fame and City of Detroit Sports Hall of Fame.

Lubanski was born in Detroit to Polish immigrants Edward and Josephine Lubanski. He was married for 62 years to Betty, and couple had four children: Janis, Edward, Paul and Robert.
