= Jamestown Polish craftsmen =

First Polish-Americans in Virginia

The Polish craftsmen in the Jamestown Colony (Polish: Rzemieślnicy z Jamestown) first arrived in 1608 to serve in essential industries in the New World. They are generally considered the first Polish Americans.

== History ==
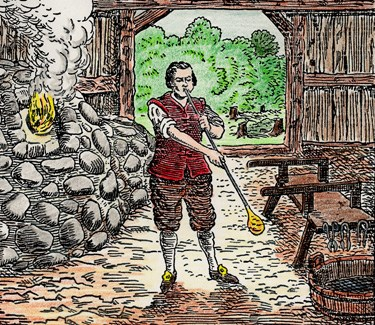
The first glass house at the Jamestown Colony was built and operated exclusively by Polish immigrants, circa. 1608

The first Polish immigrants came to the Jamestown colony in October 1608, during the "second supply", twelve years before the Pilgrims arrived in Massachusetts. These early settlers were brought as skilled artisans by the English soldier–adventurer Captain John Smith, and included a glass blower, a pitch and tar maker, a soap maker and a timberman. English writer Richard Hakluyt wrote in 1586 that colonization would require "men skillful in burning of Sope ashes, and in making of Pitch and Tarre, and Rosen, to be fetched out of Prussia and Poland, which are thence to be had for small wages, being there in manner of slaves." John Smith traveled from England to Poland in 1603 to recruit artisans for his voyage to America.

There were six Polish men that traveled with him in 1603; their names were never known definitely until 1943, when historian Karol Wachtl searched through historical Polish pamphlets in war-torn France dating to the mid-19th century. Although it is not known what documents he used in his findings, his publication, "Polonia w Ameryce" was accurate in naming the settlers.

Two of these workers would later save Smith's life in an attack by Native Americans as noted in Smith's writings. Contemporary historical accounts refer to this first group of foreign craftsmen as Dutchmen and Poles.

The foreign craftsmen began producing glassware, pitch, and potash soon after their arrival in 1608. These goods were used in the colony, but were also important as they were the first goods exported from the colony to Europe. Later more skilled workers arrived and continued to produce tar, resin, and turpentine, and clapboard and frankincense as well.

In 1947, a purported historical memoir, "Pamiętnik handlowca" ("A Merchantilist's memoir") was rumored to have surfaced in the United States and to have confirmed the names of the settlers. The memoir was to have been written by Zbigniew Stefanski, a Pole who lived in the Jamestown colony with John Smith and later to have written his memoir in Amsterdam, Netherlands in 1625. The memoir was to have revealed much about the Jamestown colony, and to have detailed stories about how Polish settlers taught the pioneers how to dig wells for drinking water, fought a strike for their right to vote, and introduced the settlers to baseball. No copy of the original text is known to exist. Nonetheless, famed settlers known today include Michał Łowicki, Zbigniew Stefański, Jan Mata, and Stanisław Sadowski. Stefanski's purported memoir changed the perception of Jamestown history; it is known from primary English sources that the Poles were hired as skilled artisans, but in Stefanski's memoir, the 6 men were to have been merchants (or at least trading officials) in Poland.

No mention of the religious background of the Polish settlers was made, and historian James Pula suggests that the Poles were likely Protestant because contemporary English sources such as Richard Hakluyt's in 1584 explicitly said no Catholic artisans should be used because of "the special inclination they have of favor to the King of Spain". Captain John Smith noted that two craftsmen helped save his life during an Indian attack that occurred near the glasshouse. (also noted in "Smith's own journals"). An excavation done in 1948–1949 found four Hessian crucibles and large quantities of "common green glass". The glass remains of window panes, bottles, and drinking jugs were found. The Glass House and the glass manufacturing industry was started and operated exclusively by the Polish workers.

== Strike ==
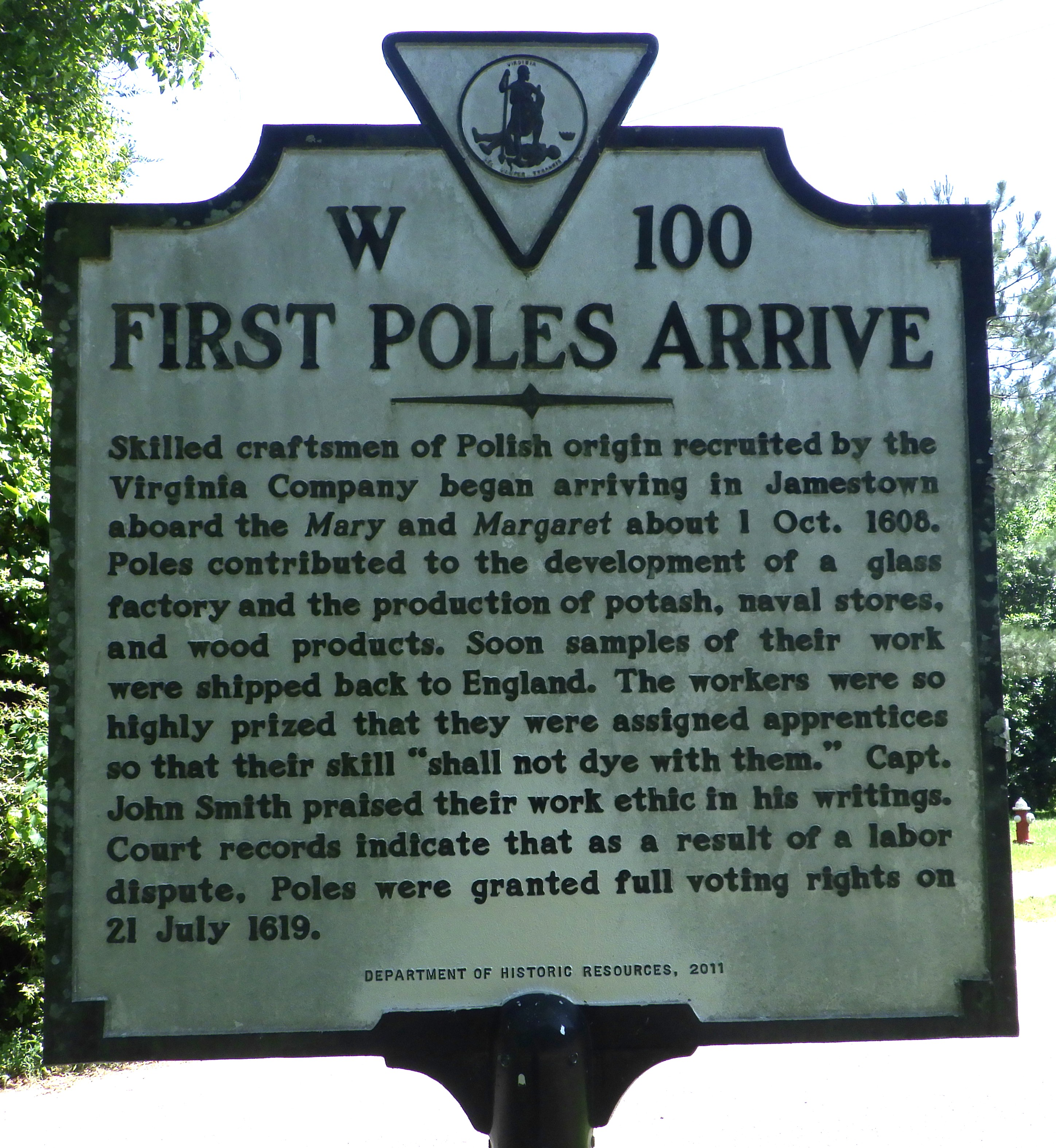
Historical marker

When the first elections in the colony were held in 1619, the colony did not allow any continental settlers to vote, including approximately 50 Polish craftsmen and their families. They were denied the right to vote on the grounds that they were not of English descent. In reaction, the Poles launched the first recorded strike in the New World, and they refused to work unless they were given the right to vote.

The skills of these Polish colonists were vital to the new settlement, as the House of Burgesses, representing the Virginia Company, ultimately recognized when it met on July 21, 1619, to discuss a negotiated settlement to the strike. Under labor pressure, the Virginia Company's Council reversed the decision to disenfranchise the craftsmen, and simultaneously struck an agreement with the craftsmen to apprentice young men from the colony. The company leaders feared not only the loss of income and labor, but that the colony might gain a reputation for not being welcoming to further settlers not of English descent, especially skilled craftsmen.

"For pitch and tar, we advise and require that the Polackers be returned in part to these their works, with such other assistance as shall be necessary. The like we shall desire for pot-ashes and soap-ashes, when there shall be fit store of hand to assist them: Requiring in the mean time, the care be generally taken, that Servants and Apprentices be so trained up in these works, as that the skill do not perish together with the Masters." (from Records of the Virginia Company, May 17, 1620.)

=== Impact and historical significance ===
In need of their industries, the House of Burgesses extended the "rights of Englishmen" to the Poles (which included some East Prussians.) Historians have identified this struggle a historical first in many respects: as an American labor strike, fight for civil rights and voting representation, and the origin of the first-ever trade apprenticeship in the American colonies.

Subsequently, the Poles established the first bilingual schools in the New World, teaching both Polish and English and later extending the curriculum to include Latin and German. The political and economic power of the Polish community declined, however, with the increased colonial warfare with Native Americans.

== Depictions ==
Poles in Jamestown by Arthur Szyk, 1939. Depiction of the Jamestown Polish craftsmen.

Arguably the best-known rendition of the Jamestown Polish craftsmen is the painting of Poles in Jamestown by Arthur Szyk. The painting was part of a collection in the Polish Pavilion of the New York World Exposition in 1939. It displays 11 Poles, when historical documents state there were "eight Dutchmen and Poles". Historian Arthur Waldo recalled expecting to see only five Poles in the painting, and asked Szyk in-person why he chose to portray 11. Szyk explained that he was inspired to make the painting by a group of historians from the Polish Foreign Office who wanted the painting to be against a summer backdrop.

Staying true to history, Szyk chose to paint the second arrival of Jamestown Polish craftsmen, who arrived in 1609, rather than the first group of Poles, who were believed to number five. The painting also shows Poles in tight-fitting trousers and bright decorations characteristic of the mountaineer region, but the black summer cap tops were clearly Krakovian. Szyk explained to Waldo that they were shown as peasants rather than artisans because doing so allowed more creative license in making folk costumes and creating a distinctly Polish look. Szyk, reflecting on his work, took satisfaction in expressing Polish identity and pride through the painting.

== See also ==
- Jamestown Exposition
- Southern Colonies
- Palant
