= Pamiętnik handlowca =

Purported 17th-century diary of a Polish artisan in Jamestown Colony, Virginia

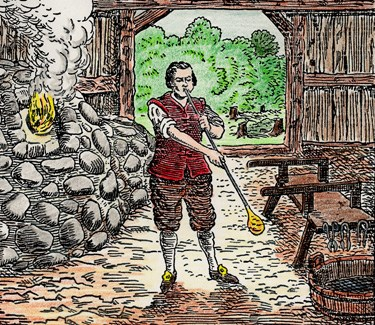
Polish artisan glassblower in Jamestown, Virginia, circa 1608.

Pamiętnik handlowca (A Merchant's Memoir, or Memoirs of a Merchant; in Latin, Memorialium commercatori) is the name of a purported diary written by a Polish merchant, Zbigniew Stefański, in 1625. No copy of the original text is known to exist. The diary was said to be written in Polish and to contain a first-hand account of the Jamestown Colony in Virginia. It was claimed to be the only extant primary source from the Jamestown Colony that provides the perspective of Polish artisans who had been brought in by Captain John Smith in 1608. As the existence of the diary has been confirmed by only a single researcher, its veracity and very existence have been questioned.

== Doubts about authenticity ==
The Memoir is said to have surfaced in Chicago, Illinois, in 1947, when a person offered to sell it to Mieczysław Haiman, the director of the Polish Museum of America. The book was popularized through the writings of the journalist and ethnographer Arthur Waldo, who claimed to have seen it and to have made a partial copy for his records, but more recently, researchers have questioned the authenticity of the source, which cannot be located in any museum, library, or collection. Waldo claimed that his copy had been given away and refused to provide further details to fellow researchers. James S. Pula in 2008 concluded, "Given all of the vain attempts to locate so much as a single reference to the Pamietnik, let alone an extant copy, it would appear that, unless some independent verification surfaces, Stefański's memoir must be rejected as a legitimate source."

== Contents and import ==
The Memoir allegedly revealed much about the Jamestown Colony and gave details of how Polish settlers taught the English pioneers how to dig wells for drinking water, fought a strike for their right to vote, and introduced the settlers to baseball. The book also allegedly confirmed the names of the six Polish settlers in Jamestown, which had previously been known only from secondary sources, often written over 100 years later. The purported existence of the diary may have helped change the perception of Jamestown history. The Poles are known, from primary English sources, to have been hired as skilled artisans, but in Stefański's memoir the six men were to have been presented as merchants or at least as trading officials in Poland.

== See also ==
- Colony of Virginia
- List of Polish Americans
- List of Slovak Americans
- Polish Americans
- Slovak Americans
