= Géraldine Schwarz =

German–French writer

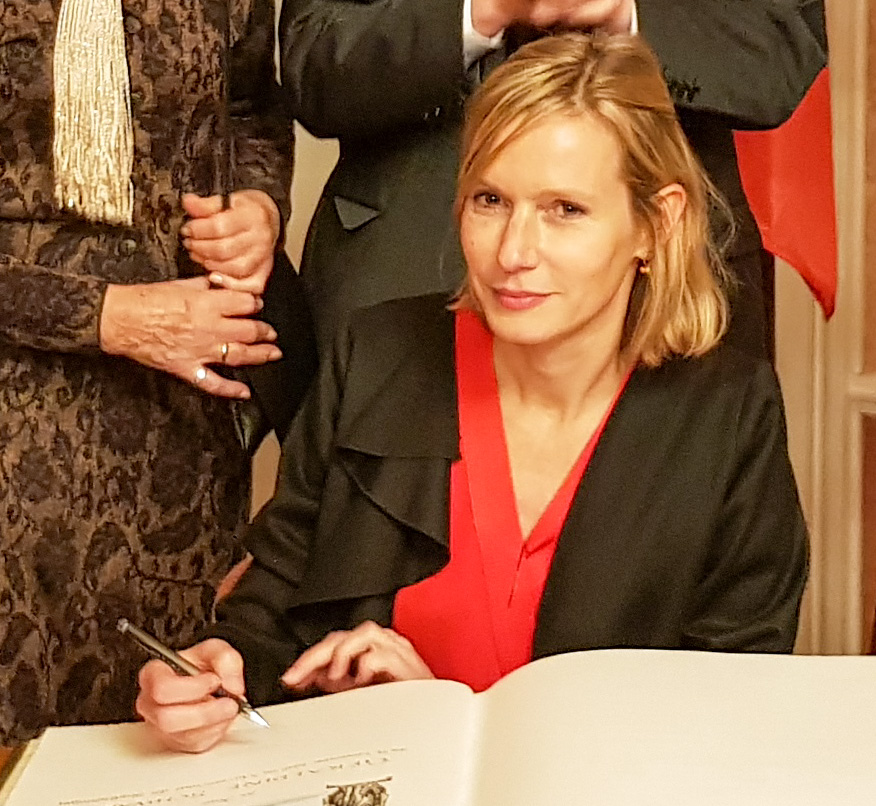
In 2019

Géraldine Schwarz (born 1 October 1974 in Strasbourg) is a German–French journalist, author and documentary filmmaker. In her publications, she pleads for a rethinking of memory politics and remembrance practice to help the past make our present better.

== Biography ==
As a daughter of a French mother and a German father, Schwarz defines herself as "a child of German-French reconciliation" and "a committed European". She grew up in the Paris area and attended the Lycee International de Saint-Germain-en-Laye from 1985 to 1992., where she passed her abitur exam at the German department in 1992. From 1993 to 1997 she studied history at the Sorbonne and at the London School of Economics. In 1997 she joined the Paris Journalist School Centre de formation des journalistes de Paris (CFJ). At the age of 25 she worked for Bloomberg News in Paris and became a correspondent for Agence France Press in Berlin. Ten years later, she took leave from news journalism. Since 2010, she has been publishing and appearing in various international media. She also makes documentary films. Her extensive documentary essay Les Amnésiques was published in France in 2017 and was awarded the European Book Prize in 2018.

== Works ==
=== Les Amnésiques ===
In 2017 Géraldine Schwarz published Les Amnésiques at Flammarion, an autobiographic and historical essay, which was translated into more than ten languages, among them German Die Gedächtnislosen, Erinnerung einer Europäerin. ISBN 978-3-906910-30-7 and English Those Who Forget at Simon & Schuster and Pushkin, ISBN 978-1-5011-9908-0. Through three generations of her family Schwarz depicts the painful Vergangenheitsbewältigung of the Nazi era in Germany. The author one day discovers that in 1938 her German grandfather Karl Schwarz had aryanised a business owned by two Jewish families Löbmann and Wertheimer in Mannheim for a low price. When after the war a survivor of the Jewish families demanded reparation payments, the grandfather refused to accept his responsibility as a Mitläufer. Her German grandmother Lydia was seduced by the life Hitler afforded Aryan women and also took advantage of the Jewish exodus from Mannheim in 1940, decorating her dining room with personal belongings from the homes of fleeing Jews. Géraldine Schwarz starts to question the past: How guilty were her grandparents? What makes us complicit? On her mother's side, she investigates the role of her French grandfather, a policeman of the Vichy regime. After the publication of the book in France, a commemorative plaque for the Löbmann and Wertheimer families was erected in the former concentration camp Le Camp des Milles. Both families were imprisoned there between 1940 and 1942, before they were deported to Auschwitz and gassed there. The sons Fritz Löbmann and Otto Wertheimer were among the children of Izieu, who were traced and found in their hideout near Lyon and also deported to Auschwitz by command of Gestapo leader Klaus Barbie.

=== Post-war reckoning and accepting responsibility ===
Schwarz claims that working up the past not by forgetting but by remembering it and bearing responsibility came late and after decades of scandalous impunity, but was after all successful. She finds the key to that success in focussing on the role of the Mitläufer, those dozens of millions of Germans who became accomplices of the Nazi criminals for opportunistic or conformistic reasons. This process of identification with the offenders promoted the people's awareness of their fallibility and sharpened their democratic responsibility. It is true, Schwarz says, that in France people are ashamed of the collaboration of the Vichy leadership with the Third Reich, the question of people's responsibility, however, has not been discussed. The author shows that many countries do not face up to their fascist, communist or colonial past. She realises a deep misunderstanding about the importance of Vergangenheitsbewältigung for the democratic stability of a country – also when dealing with populists. On the other hand, she argues that coming to terms with history is not expected to make way for a culture of guilt, which splits society. She rather advocates a reminiscential culture which is pragmatic and responsibility-oriented, to learn from history what is important for the present.

=== Reception ===
In many countries the book triggered discussions about how they are facing their own history. In her comments at the award ceremony of the Winfried-Prize cultural scientist Aleida Assmann, Germany's expert on cultural and communicative memory, said that Schwarz "has invented a new genre", a book whose framework is "not only transnational, but also transgenerational". It shows, from Assmann's point of view, "that it is possible to keep up sentiments and family loyalty, and still face historical facts", and thus make from memory an irreplaceable foundation of civic education and the self-image of a nation.

The director of the NS-Dokumentationszentrum in Munich Mirjam Zadoff wrote in Der Spiegel: "Schwarz describes as those who forget all those who today again call for forgetting, who compare the Nazi era to a birdshit in history and dispraise the Holocaust memorial as a memorial of disgrace. Samantha Power wrote in The Washington Post: "Schwarz embeds her appeal to citizens and nations to do memory work in a gripping detective story centered on her own family's history. She has a gift for finding the single scene or exchange of dialogue that drives home her points ... Schwarz's book deserves to be read and discussed widely in the United States principally for all it has to teach us about the urgency of confronting the darkest dimensions of our own history." Susan Glasser commented in The New Yorker: "Out of all the books I read this year—and I read many, stuck at home during 2020s endless quarantine—the one that resonated perhaps the most was Those Who Forget ... It made the very convincing case that, until and unless there is a full accounting for what happened with Donald Trump, 2020 is not over and never will be."

I In the Netherlands Bas Heijne wrote: "Schwarz calls for a retrospect to the present: Don't be a Mitläufer like your grandparents ... Even though you think that your contribution hardly makes a difference, you still can play an important role in history."

=== Newspaper articles and other publications ===
- "Enquête sur la seconde vie des nazis", Le Monde, 28 January 2015.
- "Die Nazis und der Nahe Osten". Welt am Sonntag, 15 February 2015.
- "Pourquoi les Allemands ont presque tout bon", Le Monde, 22 December 2015.
- "My family has a Nazi past. I see that ideology returning across Europe", The Guardian, 18 April 2018.
- "Il faut rendre aux Européens la fierté d'appartenir à ce continent", Le Monde, 29 April 2019.
- "N'insultons pas les Allemands de l'Est qui ont délibérément choisi d'enterrer leur pays", Le Monde, 9 November 2019.
- "Les espoirs perdus de la réunification", Die Tageszeitung, 9 November 2019.
- "Erinnert euch ! Wir brauchen eine neue Erinnerungskultur", Die Welt, 27 January 2020.
- "Germans know that toppling a few statues isn't enough to confront the past", The Guardian, 23 June 2020.
- "Sin Memoria no hay democracia". El País, 28 June 2020.
- "Suppressed history is like a Boomerang", De Balie cultuurcentrum, Amsterdam, August 2020.
- "Hoe kunnen we lering trekken uit de geschiedenis?" [How can we learn from History?], in Tijdschrift Nexus Instituut, Nexus 84, You tell us stories, why? September 2020
- "It's tempting to want to forget the past", Time, 22 September 2020.
- "Was uns die Krise lehrt", Die Tageszeitung, 28 November 2020.
- "Learning to learn from History", Magazine of the European Observatory on Memories, December 2020.
- Tell Me About Yesterday Tomorrow, Munich Documentation Centre for the History of National Socialism, collective volume together with among others Roger Cohen, Liam Gillick, Annette Kelm, Fred Moten, Khalil Muhammad, Andrea Petö, Dirk Rupnow, Philippe Sands, Geraldine Schwarz, and Niko Wahl, 2021.
- "Merkel: la magia de una gobernante", El Pais, 24 January 2021.
- "What researching my family's Nazi history taught me about how to approach the past", The Guardian, 2 Apr 2021.
- "D’où nous venons : Ce qui nous unit, ce qui nous divise", Flammarion, Paris 2024. ISBN 978-2-0804-4281-9.

=== Films ===
- Rester en Algérie, with Philippe Baron, France Télévision 2012
- Exil nazi: La promesse de l'orient, Artline Films, France Télévision, RTBF 2014
- Les espoirs perdus de la Réunification, Eléphant et Chrysalide productions, France Télévision, RTBF, 2019

== Acknowledgements and awards ==
1. 2018: The European Book Prize
2. 2019: The German Winfried-Prize for international understanding and peace of the city of Fulda
3. 2019: The Italian North-South Prize for Literature
4. 2020: Longlisted for the British Baillie Gifford Prize for Non-Fiction
5. 2020: Best Books of the year of the American Kirkus Reviews
6. 2021: Shortlisted for the American Mark Lynton Prize
