= Anna Bikont =

Polish journalist and writer

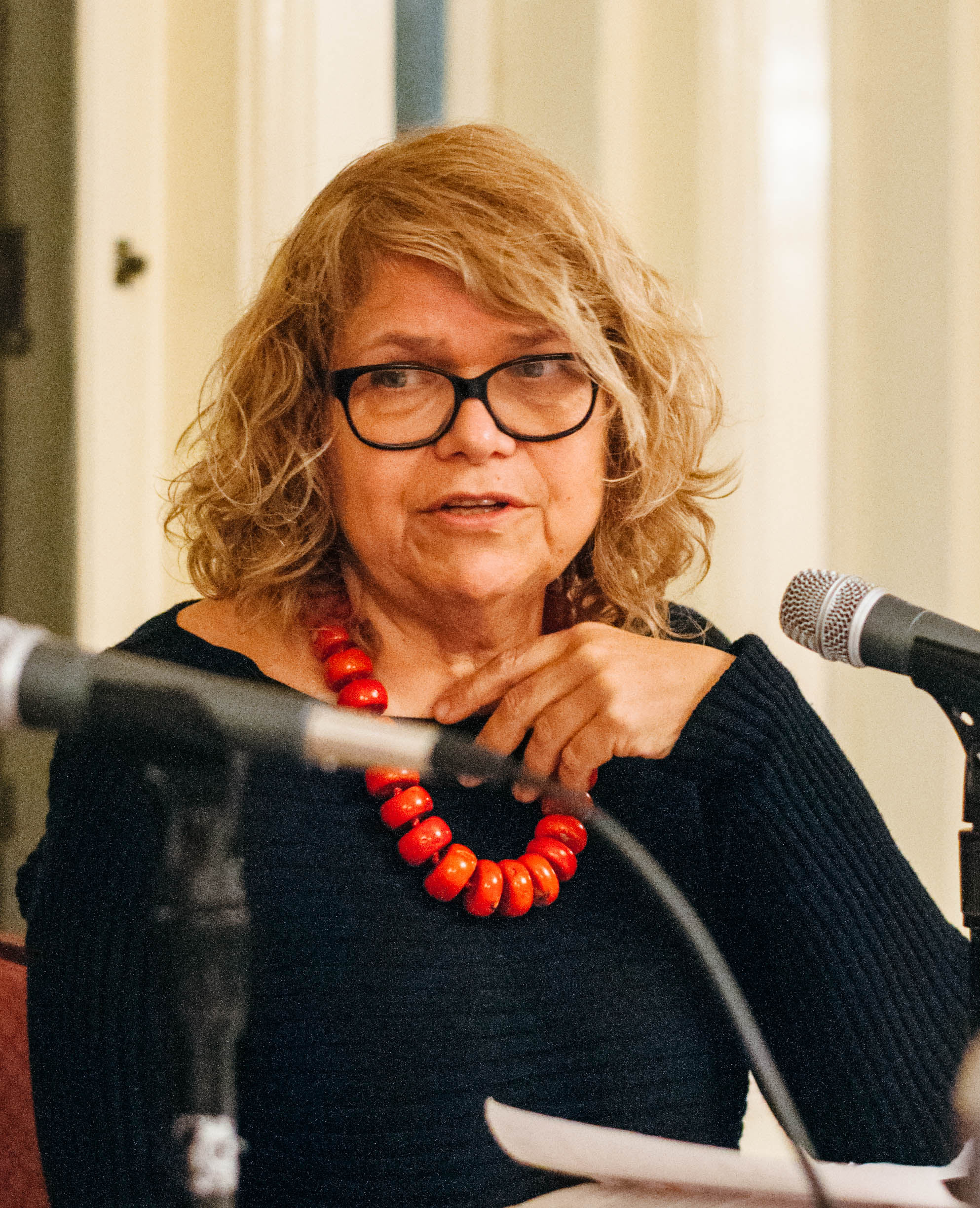
- Bikont at a reading of The Crime and the Silence at Boston University in 2015.
- Born: 17 July 1954 (age 71); Warsaw, Poland
- Education: Warsaw University
- Occupation: Writer
- Known for: Co-founder Gazeta Wyborcza
- Spouse: Piotr Bikont (deceased 2017)

Anna Bikont (born 17 July 1954) is a Polish journalist for the Gazeta Wyborcza newspaper in Warsaw. She is the author of several books, including My z Jedwabnego (2004) about the 1941 Jedwabne pogrom, which was published in English as The Crime and the Silence: Confronting the Massacre of Jews in Wartime Jedwabne (2015). The French edition, Le crime et le silence, won the European Book Prize in 2011.

== Early life and education ==
Bikont was born in a Polish-Jewish family in Warsaw to journalist Wilhelmina Skulska and Catholic-Polish writer Andrzej Kruczkowski. She has a sister, Maria Kruczkowska. A psychologist by training, Bikont also received an honorary doctorate from the University of Gotenborg.

== Career ==
Bikont worked at the University of Warsaw as a research assistant in psychology from 1980 to 1989. She joined Solidarity in 1980, becoming the editor of Informację Solidarności, an internal pamphlet that came out initially daily, then weekly and helped inform many other clandestine publications operating at that time. In 1982, she co-founded and began to edits the Tygodnik Mazowsze weekly, Poland's largest underground publication, continuing to do until 1989, when she became one of the founders of Gazeta Wyborcza, the first legal newspaper published outside the communist government's control. It became independent of Solidarity in 1990. She has continued to work for the paper as a senior journalist.

In response to Jan T. Gross's history of the Jedwabne massacre, Neighbors: The Destruction of the Jewish Community in Jedwabne, Poland (2001), the Polish government commissioned an investigation led by prosecutor Radosław Ignatiew for the Institute of National Remembrance (IPN). Bikont began her own journalistic investigation, interviewing numerous people in Jedwabne, including descendants of survivors and persons living in the city when Gross's book was published. She also wrote more about the topic in her 2004 book My z Jedwabnego (Jedwabne: Battlefield of Memory).

Her book Sendlerowa. W Ukryciu (English: Sendler: In Hiding) was a finalist for the Nike Award, and also received the 2018 Ryszard Kapuściński Award. The work chronicles the life of Irena Sendler and other Polish women who provided shelter for Jewish children during the Shoah.

== Personal life ==
Her husband, journalist and director Piotr Bikont (1955–2017), died in a car accident in 2017.

== Selected publications ==
Books

- Nie koniec, nie początek. Powojenne wybory polskich Żydów, Czarne, 2025.
- Nigdy nie byłaś Żydówką: Sześć opowieści o dziewczynkach w ukryciu, Czarne, 2023.
- (with Joanna Szczęsna) Pamiątkowe rupiecie. Biografia Wisławy Szymborskiej, Agora, Warsaw: Agora, 2023.
- Cena: W poszukiwaniu żydowskich dzieci po wojnie, Czarne, 2022.
- Lawina i Kamienie: Pisarze od i do Komunizmu, Czarne, 2021.
- (with Helena Łuczywo), Jacek (a biography of Jacek Kuroń), Znak, 2018.
- Wielogłos o Zagładzie, Kraków: Mocak, 2018.
- Sendlerowa. W ukryciu ('Sendler: In Hiding'), Wołowiec: Wydawnictwo Czarne, 2017.
- Lawina i Kamienie ('The Avalanche and the Stones', co-authored with Joanna Szczęsna), Warsaw: Prószynski, 2006.
- My z Jedwabnego ('Jedwabne: Battlefield of Memory'), Warsaw: Prószyński, 2004.
  - Le crime et le silence, Paris: Denoël, 2011. (French)
  - The Crime and the Silence: Confronting the Massacre of Jews in Wartime Jedwabne. New York: Farrar, Straus & Giroux, 2015. (English)
  - Vi från Jedwabne, Stockholm: Atlas, 2015. (Swedish)
  - Anaḥnu mi-Yedṿabneh : ha-peshaʻ ṿe-ha-hashtaḳah, Jerusalem: Carmel, 2016. (Hebrew)
  - De misdaad en het zwijgen : Jedwabne 1941, de levende herinnering aan een pogrom in Polen, Amsterdam: Nieuw Amsterdam Uitgevers, 2016. (Dutch)
  - Zui xing yu chen mo : Zhi mian ye de wa bu nei you tai ren da tu sha, Beijing: She hui ke xue wen xian chu ban she, 2018. (Chinese)
  - Il crimine e il silenzio: Jedwabne 1941 - Un massacro in cerca di verità, Torino: Einaudi, 2019. (Italian)
  - Wir aus Jedwabne: Polen und Juden während der Shoah, Berlin: Jüdischer Verlag, 2020. (German)
- Pamiątkowe rupiecie. Biografia Wisławy Szymborskiej ('Dusty Keepsakes. The biography of Wisława Szymborska', co-authored with Joanna Szczęsna), Warsaw: Prószyński i S-ka, 1997.
- And I Still See Their Faces; Images of Polish Jews, (editor), 1996.
- Małe vademecum Peerelu ('The Little Vade Mecum of Living in the Polish People's Republic', co-authored with Piotr Bikont and Wojciech Cesarski), Warsaw: Agora, 1990.

Selected Essays

- „Anachnu m'Jedwabne”, in: Ha-heshbon ha-polani: Imut im Zikaron (Facing Memory: The Polish Account), ed. Miri Paz, Tel Aviv: Hakibbutz Hameuchad, 2007.
- „A Belligerent Voice in Defence of Peace, or Europeans in Wroclaw”, Edinburgh: Edinburgh Review nr 121, 2007
- „Lechosław Goździk. Il revoluzionario e il pescatore”, Roma: MicroMega 9/2006
- „L'intimidee”, in: La vie est un reportage, Paris: Les editions Noir sur Blanc, 2005
- „We of Jedwabne”, in: The Neighbors Respond: The Controversy over the Jedwabne Massacre in Poland, ed. Antony Polonsky and Joanna B. Michlic, Princeton and Oxford: Princeton University Press, 2004.
- „Ryszard Kapuscinski celebrates Herodotus” (interview with Ryszard Kapuściński), New York: Omnivore, A Journal of Writing and Visual Culture from the New York Institute for the Humanities at NYU, Autumn 2003
- „Seen from Jedwabne”, Jerusalem: Yad Vashem Studies XXX, 2004
- „Neighbours”, Index of Censorship, UK: Thanet Press, 2001

== Selected awards ==
- 2018 – Ryszard Kapuściński Award (Sendlerowa : w ukryciu)
- 2015 – National Jewish Book Award in the Holocaust category for The Crime and the Silence: Confronting the Massacre of Jews in Wartime Jedwabne
- 2011 – European Book Prize for Le Crime et le Silence (“My z Jedwabnego”).
- 2005 – Best History Book of the Year, awarded by Polityka weekly, for “My z Jedwabnego”.
- 2005 – shortlisted for the Nike Award, the Polish equivalent of the Booker Prize, for "My z Jedwabnego".
- 2001 – the Grand Press prize – the most prestigious journalistic award in Poland, for articles on the crime in Jedwabne, published by Gazeta Wyborcza.

Fellowships

- Cullman Fellowship, New York Public Library, New York, 2008/2009
