= Rob Riemen =

Rob Rieman
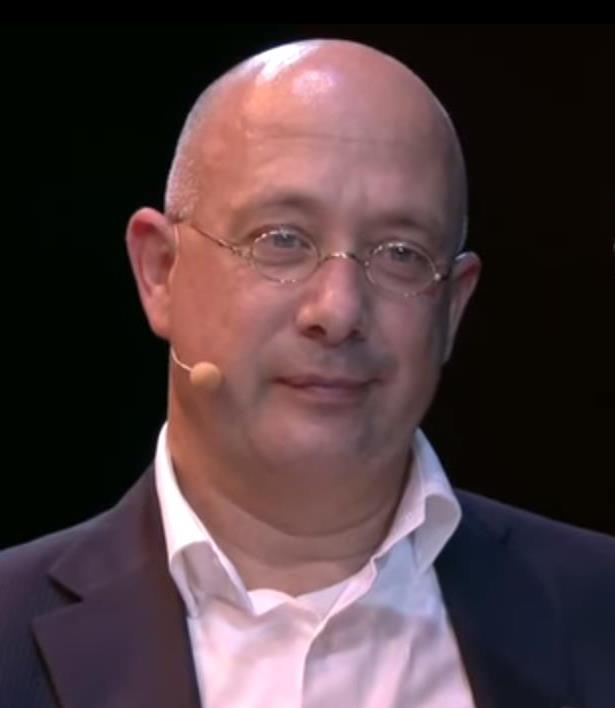
- Riemen (2018)
- Born: February 18, 1962 (age 64)
- Education: Catholic University of Brabant

Rob Riemen (born 18 February 1962) is a Dutch writer and cultural philosopher. He is the director of the Nexus Institute.

== Background ==
Riemen grew up in a Catholic working-class family. His father was a union administrator and his mother also worked in a union. Riemen studied theology and philosophy at the Catholic University of Brabant where he graduated in 1992. In the same year, his brother and his first wife died. He then came into contact with publisher and bookseller Johan Polak, who supported him in setting up the magazine Nexus. After the death of Polak, Riemen founded the Nexus Institute in 1994.

== Publications and discussions ==
His book Nobility of Spirit (Adel van de geest, 2009), a plea for classical humanistic values, such as living in truth, creating beauty, making justice happen and gaining wisdom. It has been translated into Spanish, English, French, Romanian, German and Italian.

In 2010, Riemen published To Fight Against This Age (De eeuwige terugkeer van het fascisme). Riemen discusses statements by the Party for Freedom (PVV) in the light of historical fascism and believes that the PVV has taken advantage of a spiritual vacuum arising from the decline of professional education, commercial culture, and a lack of principles in politics. This drew criticicm from former VVD leader Frits Bolkestein.

In November 2010, discussion arose about statements made by Riemen in the newspaper NRC Handelsblad that, among other things, Geert Wilders should be called a fascist. On the television program Nieuwsuur, Arend Jan Boekestijn debated this position with Riemen.

In August 2011, Riemen called the PVV a fascist party, after the Brabant PVV group had made a call to immediately stop the subsidy to the Nexus Institute.

== Selected bibliography ==
- Adel van de geest; een vergeten ideaal, Atlas/Contact, Amsterdam, 2009. 188 pp. ISBN 978 90 4501 7327
  - Nobility of Spirit: a forgotten ideal, New Haven, Connecticut: Yale University Press. Engelse versie.
- De eeuwige terugkeer van het fascisme, Atlas, Amsterdam/Antwerp, 2010. 62 pp. ISBN 978 90 4501 8560
  - To Fight Against This Age: On Fascism and Humanism, W.W. Norton & Company, 2018
- With George Steiner: The Idea of Europe. An Essay, New York: Overlook Duckworth, 2015.
  - De terugkeer van Europa: haar tranen, daden en dromen, Tilburg: Nexus Instituut. Reeks: Nexus, 70.
