= Maxim Leo =

German journalist and author (born 1970)

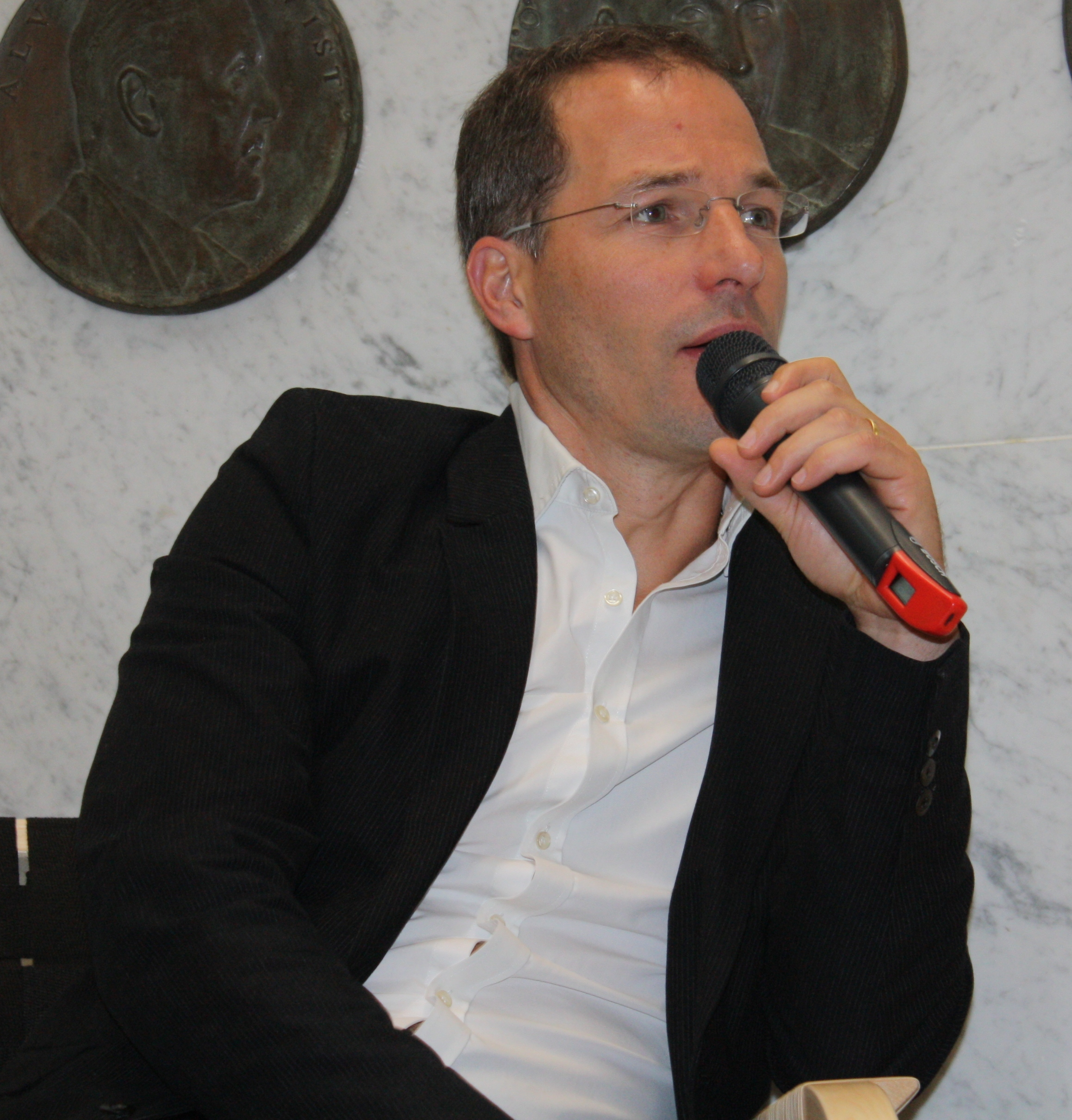
- Born: 30 January 1970 (age 56); East Berlin, East Germany
- Education: Free University of Berlin
- Mother: Annette Leo
- Relatives: Gerhard Leo (grandfather)

Maxim Leo (born 30 January 1970) is a German journalist and author. He was born in East Germany and studied Political Science at the Free University of Berlin. He has been an editor at the Berliner Zeitung since 1997. In 2011, he won the European Book Prize for his book Red Love, detailing his Jewish family's history during the Cold War in East Germany.
