= Annette Leo =

German historian and biographer (born 1948)

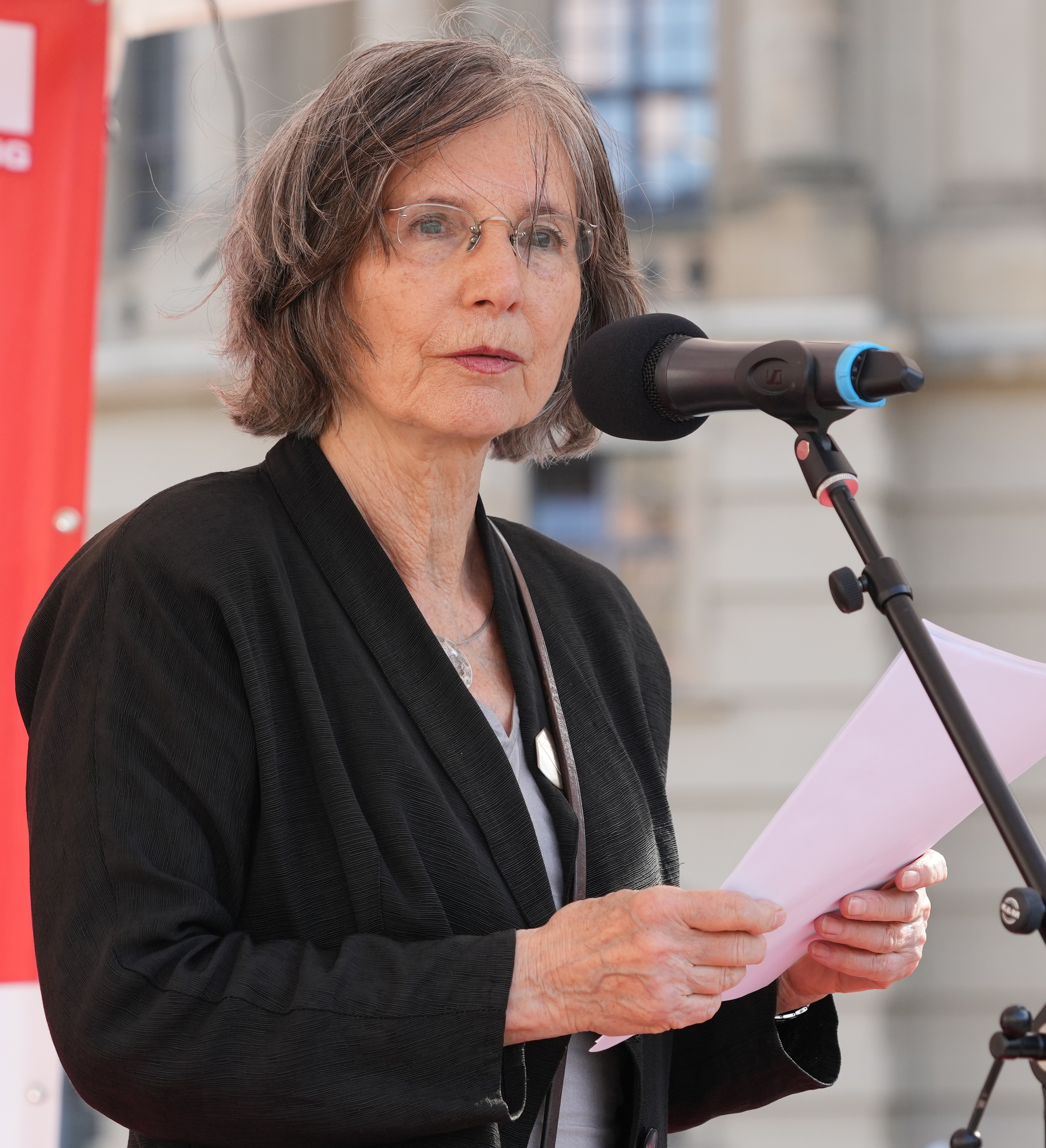
- Annette Leo in 2022
- Born: 25 February 1948 (age 78); Berlin, West Germany
- Education: Humboldt University of Berlin, East Germany
- Occupations: Journalist; Historian; Biographer; Academic/researcher; University teacher (Jena)
- Spouse: Wolf Leo (divorced)
- Children: Maxim Leo
- Parent(s): Gerhard Leo (1923 – 2009); Nora Lubinski (1922 – 2010)

Annette Leo is a German historian and biographer. In 2008, she was a recipient of the Annalise Wagner Prize.

== Life ==
Annette Leo was born in Duesseldorf, the eldest of her parents' daughters. When she was four, her parents, relocating against the overwhelming east-west tide of central European migration during the 1950s, took her to live in East Berlin. She later discovered that the sudden move was triggered not - at least not directly - by political conviction, but by an instruction her father had received from the Communist Party: alongside his other work, her father was working for the party. The family took a winter break in Thuringia in 1952 and simply never returned to West Germany. Annette Leo grew up in the German Democratic Republic (East Germany). Gerhard Leo (1923 – 2009), her father, was a Jewish journalist originally from Berlin who had escaped Nazi Germany and spent the war years as a Résistance fighter in France. Her mother, born Nora Lubinski (1922 – 2010), was the daughter of Dagobert Lubinski (1893 – 1943), another left-wing journalist and a resistance activist: he stayed in Germany and was murdered at Auschwitz. As she grew up in East Berlin, anti-fascism was one of the things that bound the Leo family together. That never translated into a comfortable relationship with the allegedly anti-fascist East German state, however.

In 1966, Annette Leo joined the party. (East Germany had been a one-party dictatorship since shortly after 1946.) 1966 was also the year in which she passed her Abitur (school final exams), opening the way to a university-level education. More immediately, however, she undertook a two-year internship with the Berliner Zeitung (newspaper). Between 1968 and 1973, Leo studied History and Romance studies at the Humboldt University, at that time in East Berlin. Her son, Maxim Leo, was born in 1970 while she was still working for her degree.

On graduating, she embarked on a career in journalism. One of the publications to which she contributed between 1979 and 1981 was the political and economic weekly magazine Horizont. She had always wanted to become a journalist, but now she hated it: "... party hacks and burned out security service employees ... people who put on a jacket to walk down the corridor". (Note: ... abgehalfterte Parteigänger und verbrannte Geheimdienstler ... Leute, die ihr Jackett anzogen, wenn sie auf den Gang gingen.) In 1982 she received her doctorate from Berlin University: her dissertation concerned the "Spanish Workers' Commissions in the struggle against Franco". (Note: "Spanischen Arbeiterkommission im Kampf gegen Franco") Between 1982 and 1986, she worked as a contributing editor with the Neue Berliner Illustrierte (weekly magazine). Then, from 1986 till 1989, she supported herself as a freelance historian and journalist. As it began to appear that time was running out for the East German one-party dictatorship, in January 1990 Annette Leo was a co-founder of Die andere, described by backers as "the first alternative [weekly] newspaper in the German Democratic Republic". (Note: als"... der ersten alternativen Zeitung der DDR.")

After reunification, between 1991 and 1993, Leo took an academic position at the Prenzlauer Berg Museum on the south side of Berlin. Then from 1993 till 1996she worked with the Research Institute for Workers' Education ("Forschungsinstitut Arbeit, Bildung, Partizipation") at Recklinghausen. Here she worked on the oral history project "Politisch-gesellschaftlicher Wandel im Geschichtsbewusstsein von Arbeitnehmern in den alten und neuen Bundesländern" (loosely, "social and political change in historical awareness of workers in the old and new federal states (i.e. in former West Germany and former East Germany))".

She worked between 2001 and 2005 with the Center for Research on Antisemitism at Technische Universität Berlin. While working at the centre, in 2004, she published a biography of the linguist and folklorist Wolfgang Steinitz (1905 – 1967). In 2006, Leo became a research associate at the Historical Institute of the University of Jena, where for some years she also held a teaching chair. The Steinitz book was not her first serious biography. In 1991, Annette Leo published "Briefe zwischen Kommen und Gehen", a biography of Dagobert Lubinski, her maternal grandfather who had been a communist journalist and a resistance fighter. Lubinski was also Jewish and was murdered at Auschwitz.

In 2008, Annette Leo received the Annalise Wagner Prize for a piece of work she produced on daily life in the Ravensbrück women's concentration camp at Fürstenberg during the Hitler years. In 2012 her biography of Erwin Strittmatter (1912 – 1994) triggered a widespread debate on the author's historical role as one of the most popular novelists in the German Democratic Republic.

Leo's 2018 documentary film "Das Kind auf der Liste" ("The child on the list") presents the story of the Sinto child Willy Blum and his family. In 1944, Willy Blum, then aged 16, was taken with his 10-year-old brother Rudolf from the Buchenwald concentration camp to the Auschwitz concentration camp where both boys were murdered. They were part of a batch of 200 children and young people sent on the death train from Buchenwald to Auschwitz. Originally the two hundredth on the list was to have been the three-year-old toddler Stefan Jerzy Zweig but at some stage someone had crossed out Zweig's name and substituted that of the Sinto child. The fates of the boy who was murdered and that of the boy who survived were accordingly always intertwined. A heavily politicised version of the story from the perspective of Zweig (who has subsequently achieved a measure of notability on his own account as an author and cameraman) was already familiar to many German readers, cinema goers and television audiences thanks to the success of the 1958 East German novel Naked Among Wolves which has been adapted for the big screen and (at least twice) for the small screen, but until Annette Leo produced her documentary, the story of the boys who were murdered was unknown. At least one critic reacted by asking why it had taken so long for the story of the Blum boys to come into the public sphere ("Endlich! Warum erst jetzt?").

== Maxim ==
Annette Leo's son, Maxim Leo (born 30 January 1970) is a Franco-German author, screen-write and journalist who writes for the Berliner Zeitung.
