= Irena Sendler =

Polish humanitarian and resistance fighter (1910–2008)

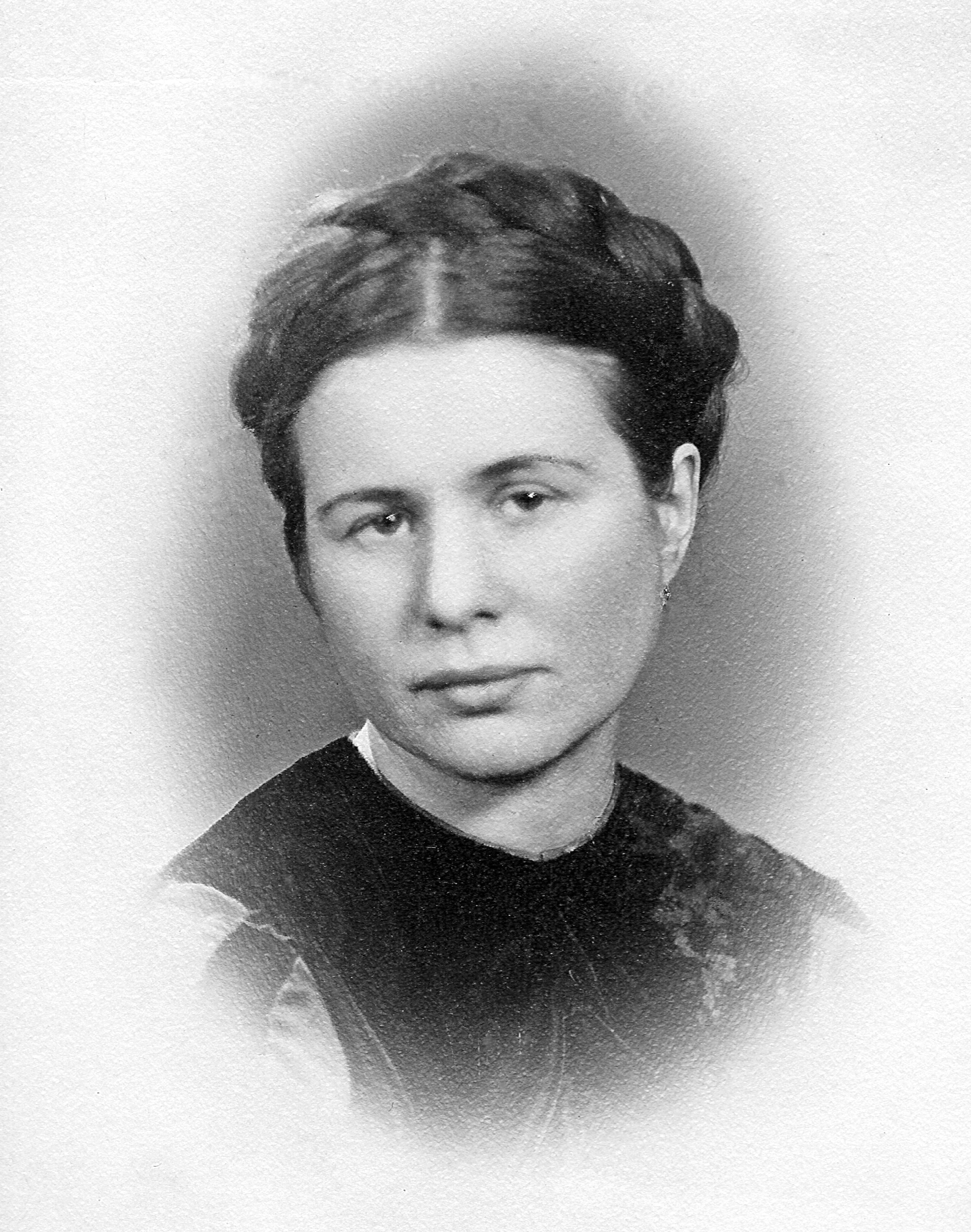
- Sendler c. 1942
- Born: Irena Krzyżanowska; 15 February 1910; Warsaw, Congress Poland, Russian Empire
- Died: 12 May 2008 (aged 98); Warsaw, Poland
- Occupations: Social worker, humanitarian, nurse, administrator, educator
- Spouses: Mieczyslaw Sendler (m. 1931; div. 1947) (m. 1961; div. 1971) Stefan Zgrzembski (m. 1947; died 1961)
- Children: 3
- Parents: Stanisław Krzyżanowski (father); Janina Karolina Grzybowska (mother)

Irena Stanisława Sendler (Note: Polish pronunciation: [iˈrɛna staɲiˈswava ˈsɛndlɛr]. In accordance with Polish naming customs, her last name is sometimes rendered Sendlerowa [sɛndlɛˈrɔva].) (née Krzyżanowska; (Note: Polish pronunciation: [kʂɨʐaˈnɔfska].) 15 February 1910 – 12 May 2008), operating under the nom de guerre Jolanta, was a Polish humanitarian, social worker, and nurse who served in the Polish Underground Resistance during World War II in German-occupied Warsaw. From October 1943 she was head of the children's section of Żegota, the Polish Council to Aid Jews (Polish: Rada Pomocy Żydom).

In the 1930s, Sendler conducted her social work as one of the activists connected to the Free Polish University. From 1935 to October 1943, she worked for the Department of Social Welfare and Public Health of the City of Warsaw. During the war she pursued conspiratorial activities, such as rescuing Jews, primarily as part of the network of workers and volunteers from that department, mostly women. Sendler participated, with dozens of others, in smuggling Jewish children out of the Warsaw Ghetto and then providing them with false identity documents and shelter with willing Polish families or in orphanages and other care facilities, including Catholic nun convents, saving those children from the Holocaust.

The German occupiers suspected Sendler's involvement in the Polish Underground and in October 1943 she was arrested by the Gestapo, but she managed to hide the list of the names and locations of the rescued Jewish children, preventing this information from falling into the hands of the Gestapo. Withstanding torture and imprisonment, Sendler never revealed anything about her work or the location of the saved children. She was sentenced to death but narrowly escaped on the day of her scheduled execution, after Żegota bribed German officials to obtain her release.

In post-war communist Poland, Sendler continued her social activism but also pursued a government career. In 1965, she was recognised by the State of Israel as Righteous Among the Nations. Among the many decorations Sendler received were the Gold Cross of Merit granted to her in 1946 for the saving of Jews and the Order of the White Eagle, Poland's highest honour, awarded late in Sendler's life for her wartime humanitarian efforts. (Note: Sendler was one of the first Poles recognized as Righteous Among the Nations due to the efforts of Jonas Turkow, who stated for a Polish language periodical in Israel: "This noble woman ... worked for Żegota and saved hundreds of Jewish children, placing them in orphanages, convents and other places". The number of Jewish children saved through Sendler's efforts is not known. The Social Welfare Department of the Central Committee of Polish Jews stated in January 1947 that Sendler saved at least several dozen Jewish children. Later in her life, Sendler repeatedly claimed that she had saved 2,500 Jewish children. When Michał Głowiński, who as a child survived the war with Sendler's help, was working on his book The Black Seasons in the late 1990s, Sendler insisted that he write about the 2,500 children she saved. As Głowiński later told Anna Bikont, he felt obliged to comply because "one cannot refuse Sendler". Sendler often spoke of the list of 2,500 children she produced, kept in two bottles and gave to Adolf Berman, but no such list has ever materialized and Berman never mentioned its existence. For the first time she talked about the list and the 2,500 saved children (and adults) in 1979; back then, however, she did not suggest that she was personally responsible for their survival and named twenty-four people also involved in their rescue.)

== Biography ==
=== Before World War II ===
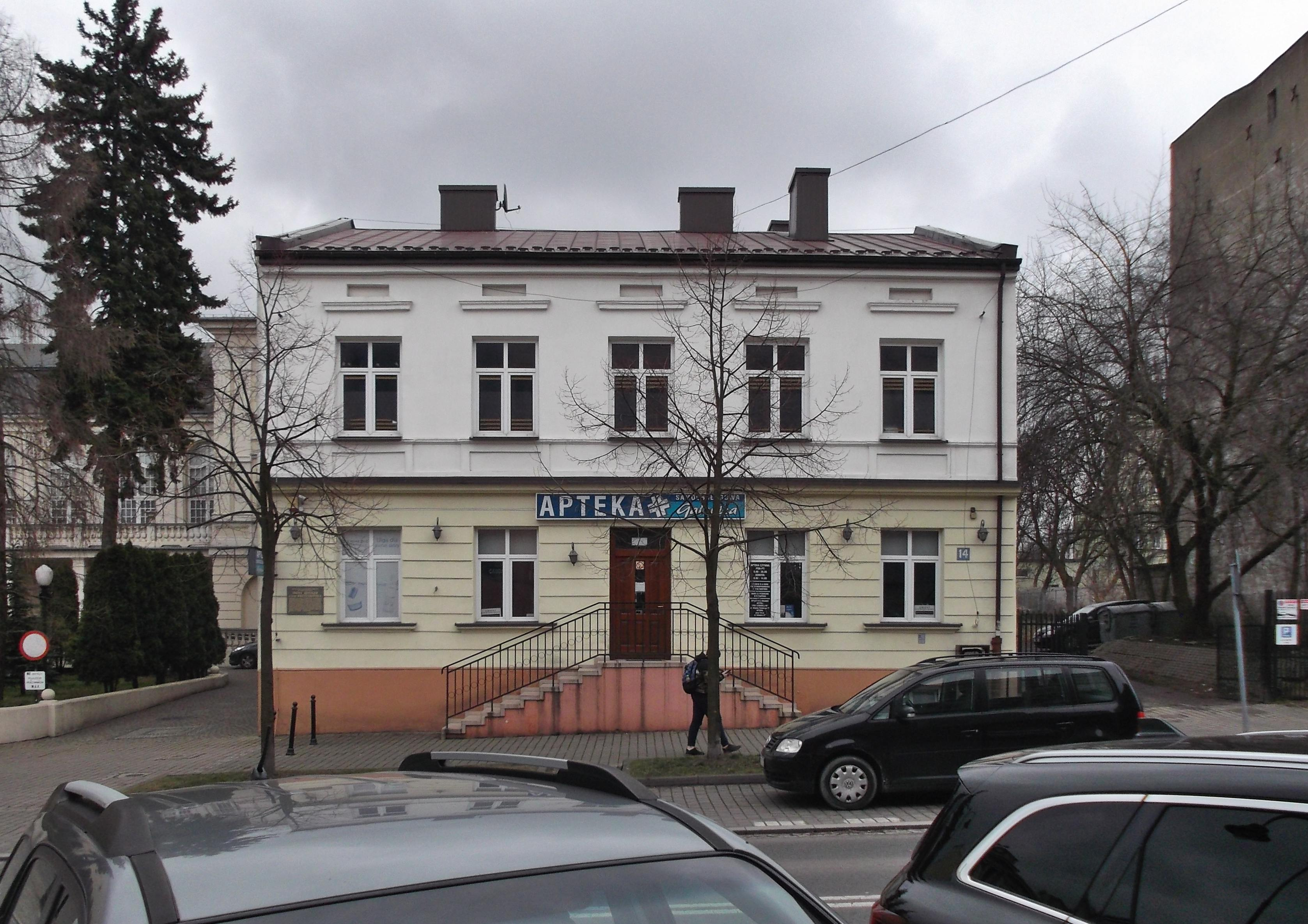
Childhood home of Irena Sendler in Piotrków Trybunalski

Sendler was born on 15 February 1910 in Warsaw, to Stanisław Henryk Krzyżanowski, a physician, and his wife, Janina Karolina (née Grzybowska). She was baptized Irena Stanisława on 2 February 1917 in Otwock. She initially grew up in Otwock, a town about 15 miles (24 km) southeast of Warsaw, where there was a Jewish community. Her father, a humanitarian who treated the very poor, including Jews, free of charge, died in February 1917 from typhus contracted from his patients. After his death, the Jewish community offered financial help for the widow and her daughter, though Janina Krzyżanowska declined their assistance. Afterwards she lived in Tarczyn and Piotrków Trybunalski.

From 1927, Sendler studied law for two years and then Polish literature at the University of Warsaw, interrupting her studies for several years from 1932 to 1937. She opposed the ghetto benches system practiced in the 1930s at many Polish institutions of higher learning (from 1937 at the University of Warsaw) and defaced the "non-Jewish" identification on her grade card. She reported having suffered from academic disciplinary measures because of her activities and reputation as a communist and philo-Semite. By the outbreak of World War II she submitted her magister degree thesis, but had not taken the final exams. Sendler joined the Union of Polish Democratic Youth (Związek Polskiej Młodzieży Demokratycznej) in 1928; during the war she became a member of the Polish Socialist Party (PPS). She was repeatedly refused employment in the Warsaw school system because of negative recommendations issued by the university, which ascribed radically leftist views to her.

Sendler became associated with social and educational units of the Free Polish University (Wolna Wszechnica Polska), where she met and was influenced by activists from the illegal Communist Party of Poland. At Wszechnica Sendler belonged to a group of social workers led by Professor Helena Radlińska; a dozen or more women from that circle would later engage in rescuing Jews. From her social work on-site interviews Sendler recalled many cases of extreme poverty that she encountered among the Jewish population of Warsaw.

Sendler was employed in a legal counseling and social help clinic, the Section for Mother and Child Assistance at the Citizen Committee for Helping the Unemployed. She published two pieces in 1934, both concerned with the situation of children born out of wedlock and their mothers. She worked mostly in the field, crisscrossing Warsaw's impoverished neighborhoods, and her clients were helpless, socially disadvantaged women. In 1935, the government abolished the section. Many of its members became employees of the City of Warsaw, including Sendler in the Department of Social Welfare and Public Health.

Sendler married Mieczysław Sendler in 1931. He was mobilized for war, captured as a soldier in September 1939 and remained in a German prisoner of war camp until 1945; they divorced in 1947. She then married Stefan Zgrzembski (born Adam Celnikier), a Jewish friend and wartime companion, by whom she had three children, Janina, Andrzej (who died in infancy), and Adam (who died of heart failure in 1999). In 1957 Zgrzembski left the family; he died in 1961 and Irena remarried her first husband, Mieczysław Sendler. Ten years later they divorced again.

=== During World War II ===
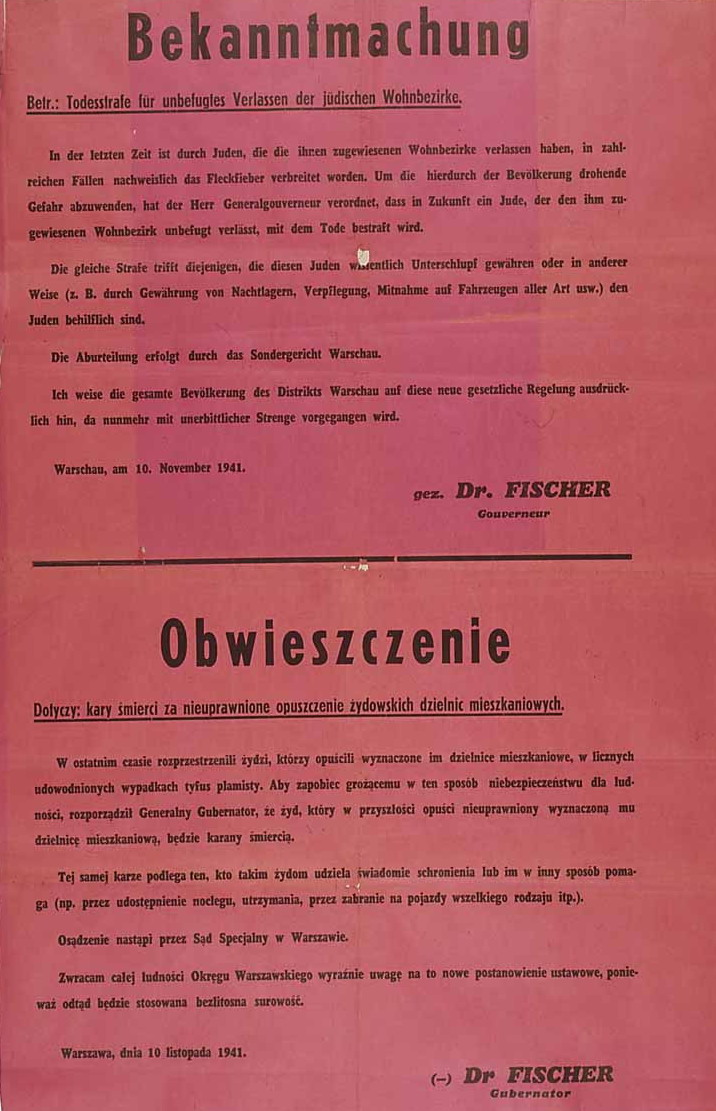
Announcement of death penalty for Jews found outside the ghetto and for Poles helping Jews in any way, 1941

Soon after the German invasion, on 1 September 1939, the German occupation authorities ordered Jews removed from the staff of the municipal Social Welfare Department where Sendler worked and barred the department from providing any assistance to Warsaw's Jewish citizens. Sendler with her colleagues and activists from the department's PPS cell became involved in helping the wounded and sick Polish soldiers. On Sendler's initiative the cell began generating false medical documents, needed by the soldiers and poor families to obtain aid. Her PPS comrades unaware, Sendler extended such assistance also to her Jewish charges, who were now officially served only by the Jewish community institutions. With Jadwiga Piotrowska, Jadwiga Sałek-Deneko and Irena Schultz, Sendler also created other false references and pursued ingenious schemes in order to help Jewish families and children excluded from their department's social welfare protection.

Around four hundred thousand Jews were crowded into a small portion of the city designated as the Warsaw Ghetto and the Nazis sealed the area in November 1940. As employees of the Social Welfare Department, Sendler and Schultz gained access to special permits for entering the ghetto to check for signs of typhus, a disease the Germans feared would spread beyond the ghetto. Under the pretext of conducting sanitary inspections, they brought medications and cleanliness items and sneaked clothing, food, and other necessities into the ghetto. For Sendler, one initial motivation for the expanding ghetto aid operation were her friends, acquaintances and former colleagues who ended up on the Jewish side of the wall, beginning with Adam Celnikier (he managed to leave the ghetto at the time of its liquidation). Sendler and other social workers would eventually help the Jews who escaped or arrange for smuggling out babies and small children from the ghetto using various means available. Transferring Jews out of the ghetto and facilitating their survival elsewhere became an urgent priority in the summer of 1942, at the time of the Great Action.

This work was done at huge risk, as—since October 1941—giving any kind of assistance to Jews in German-occupied Poland was punishable by death, not just for the person who was providing the help but also for their entire family or household.

Sendler joined the Polish Socialists, a left-wing branch of the Polish Socialist Party (PPS). The Polish Socialists evolved into the Polish Socialist Workers' Party (RPPS), which cooperated with the communist Polish Workers' Party (PPR). Sendler was known there by her conspiratorial pseudonym Klara and among her duties were searching for places to stay, issuing fake documents and being a liaison, guiding activists to clandestine meetings. In the RPPS there were Poles she knew, involved in saving Jews, as well as Jews that she had helped. Sendler participated in the secret life of the ghetto. She described a commemoration event there, on the anniversary of the October Revolution but in the spirit of the Polish leftist tradition; it included artistic performances by children. While in the ghetto, she wore a Star of David as a sign of solidarity with the Jewish people.

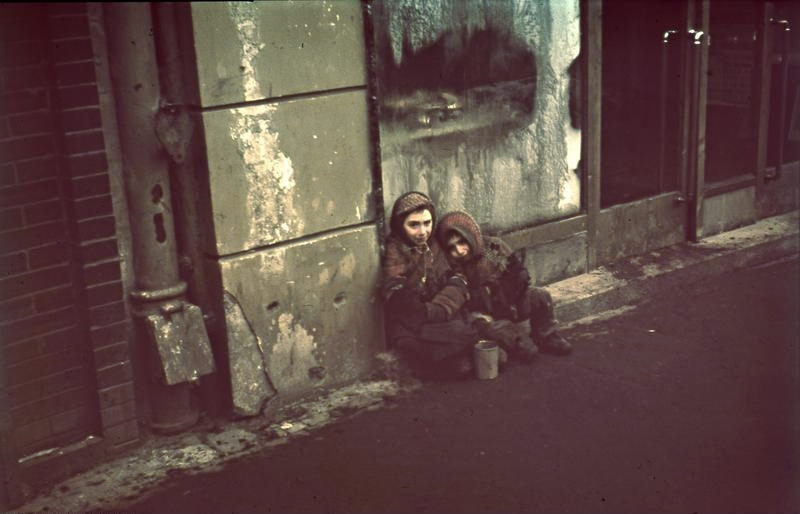
Jewish children in the Warsaw Ghetto

The Jewish ghetto was a functioning community and to many Jews seemed the safest available place for themselves and their children. In addition, survival on the outside was plausible only for people with access to financial resources. This calculation lost its validity in July 1942, when the Germans proceeded with the liquidation of the ghetto in Warsaw, to be followed by the extermination of its residents. Sendler and her associates—as related by Jonas Turkow—could take a small number of children, and a certain number could be accepted and supported by Christian institutions, but a larger-scale action was prevented by the lack of funds. Initial funds for transfer and maintenance of ghetto children were provided by members of the Jewish community, still in existence, in cooperation with women from the Welfare Department. Sendler and others, in accordance with their mission, wanted to help the neediest children (such as orphans) first. Turkow, who contacted Wanda Wyrobek and Sendler to take out of the ghetto and arrange care for his daughter Margarita, wanted to prioritize children of the most "deserving" (accomplished) people.

During the Great Action, Sendler kept entering or trying to enter the ghetto. She made desperate attempts to save her friends, but among her former Welfare Department associates unable or unwilling to leave the ghetto were Ewa Rechtman and Ala Gołąb-Grynberg. According to Jadwiga Piotrowska, who saved numerous Jewish children, during the Great Action people from the Welfare Department operated individually (had no organization or leader). Other accounts suggest that women from that group concentrated on making arrangements for Jews who had already left the ghetto, and that Sendler in particular took care of adults and adolescents.

Żegota (the Council to Aid Jews) was an underground organization that originated on 27 September 1942 as the Provisional Committee to Aid Jews, led by Zofia Kossak-Szczucka, a resistance fighter and writer. By that time, most Polish Jews were no longer alive. Żegota, established on 4 December 1942, was a new form of the committee, expanded by the participation of Jewish parties and chaired by Julian Grobelny. It was financed by the founder of the Provisional Committee, the Government Delegation for Poland, a Polish Underground State institution representing the Polish government-in-exile. Working for Żegota from January 1943, Sendler functioned as a coordinator of the Welfare Department network. They distributed money grants that became available from Żegota. Regular payments, however insufficient for the needs, enhanced their ability to assist the hiding Jews. In 1963, Sendler specifically listed 29 people she worked with within the Żegota operation, adding that 15 more perished during the war. In regard to the action of saving Jewish children, according to a 1975 opinion written by Sendler's former Welfare Department co-workers, she was the most active and organizationally gifted of participants.

During the Warsaw Ghetto Uprising, a network of emergency shelters was created by Sendler's group: private residencies where Jews could be temporarily housed, while Żegota worked on producing documents and finding longer-term locations for them. Many Jewish children went through the homes of Izabella Kuczkowska, Zofia Wędrychowska, and other social workers. Helena Rybak and Jadwiga Koszutska were activists from the communist underground.

Every child saved with my help is the justification of my existence on this Earth, and not a title to glory.

— Irena Sendler

In August 1943, Żegota set up its children's section, directed by Aleksandra Dargiel, a manager in the Central Welfare Council (RGO). Dargiel, overwhelmed by her RGO duties, resigned in September and proposed Sendler to be her replacement. Sendler, then known by her nom de guerre Jolanta, took over the section from October 1943.

Permanently, Jewish children were placed by Sendler's network with Polish families (25%), in Warsaw orphanage of the Franciscan Sisters of the Family of Mary led by Mother Provincial Matylda Getter, Roman Catholic convents such as the Sister Servants of the Blessed Virgin Mary in Turkowice (sisters Aniela Polechajłło and Antonina Manaszczuk) or the Felician Sisters, in Boduen Home charity facilities for children, and other orphanages (75%). A nun convent offered the best opportunity for a Jewish child to survive and be taken care of. To accomplish the transfers and placement of children, Sendler worked closely with other volunteers. The children were often given Christian names and taught Christian prayers in case they were tested. Sendler wanted to preserve the children's Jewish identities, so she kept careful documentation listing their Christian names, given names, and current locations. (Note: Actual events tend to be difficult to reconstruct because later, purposely or inadvertently, for different audiences and at different times, Sendler told different stories with aspects that were mutually incompatible or contrary to known facts. For example, in 1998 Sendler claimed that the communist authorities kept refusing to issue her passport for twenty years, despite the invitations from Yad Vashem she had been receiving during that period. Anna Bikont found those claims to be false. The passport was refused in 1981, after the first such invitation, because of the lack of diplomatic relations with Israel, and the decision was reversed in 1983. Previously Sendler also had a passport: on several occasions she went to Sweden to visit her son, who was receiving medical treatment there.)

According to American historian Debórah Dwork, Sendler was the inspiration and the prime mover for the whole network that saved Jewish children. She and her co-workers buried lists of the hidden children in jars in order to keep track of their original and new identities. The aim was to return the children to their original families, if still alive after the war.

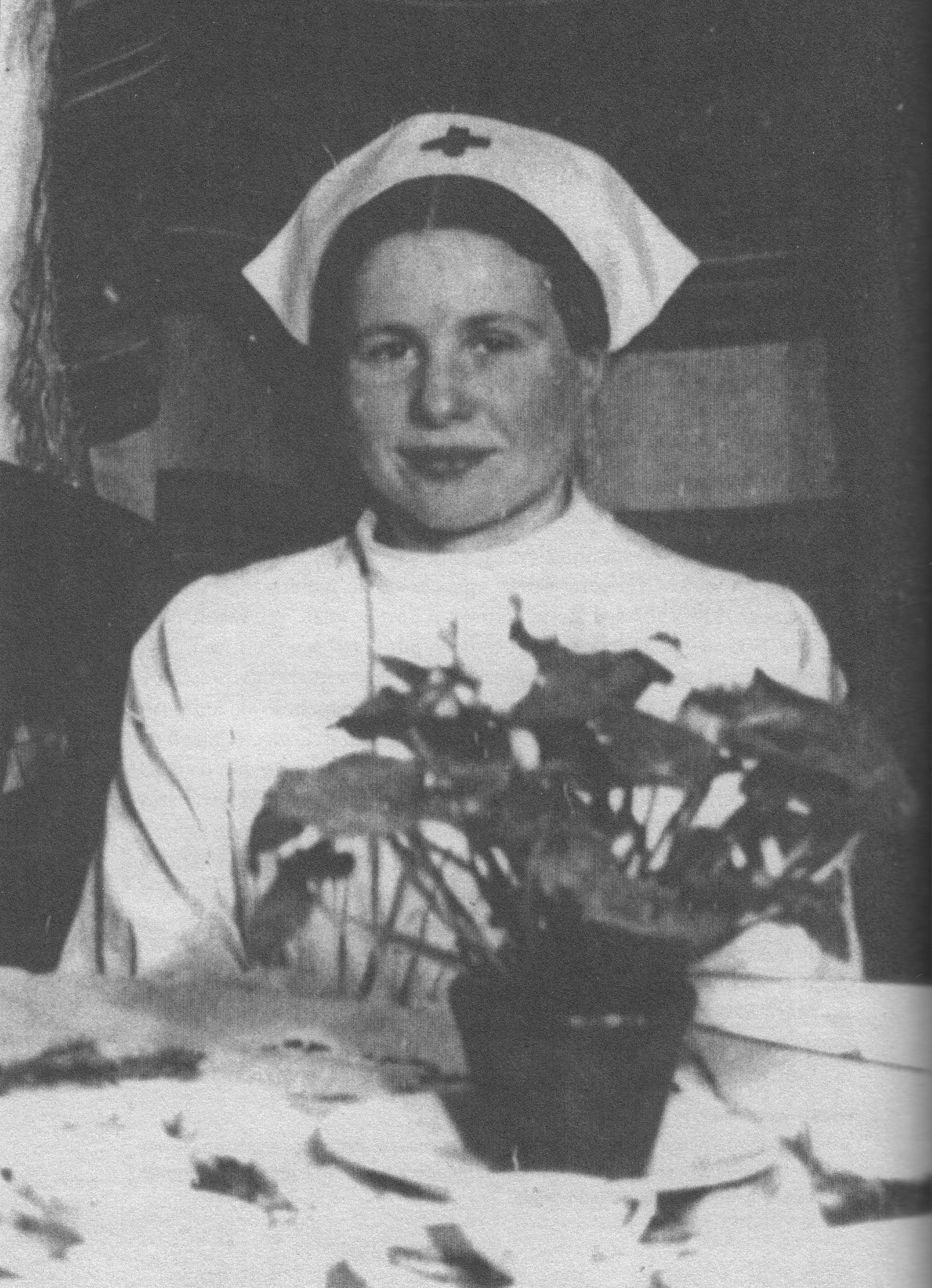
Irena Sendler in December 1944

On 18 October 1943, Sendler was arrested by the Gestapo. As they ransacked her house, Sendler tossed the lists of children to her friend Janina Grabowska, who hid the list in her loose clothing. Should the Gestapo access this information, all children would be compromised, but Grabowska was never searched. The Gestapo took Sendler to their headquarters and beat her brutally. Despite this, she refused to betray any of her comrades or the children they rescued. She was placed in the Pawiak prison, where she was subjected to further interrogations and beatings, and from there on 13 November taken to another location, to be executed by firing squad. According to biographer Anna Mieszkowska and Sendler, these events took place on 20 January. Her life was saved, however, because the German guards escorting her were bribed, and she was released on the way to the execution. Sendler was freed due to the efforts of Maria Palester, a fellow Welfare Department activist, who obtained the necessary funds from Żegota chief Julian Grobelny; she used her contacts and a teenage daughter to transfer the bribe money. On 30 November, Warsaw's mayor Julian Kulski asked the German authorities for permission to re-employ Sendler in the Welfare Department with back-pay for the period of her imprisonment. Permission was granted on 14 April 1944, but Sendler found it prudent to remain in hiding, as Klara Dąbrowska, a nurse. Already in mid-December 1943, she had resumed her duties as manager of the children's section of Żegota.

During the Warsaw Uprising, Sendler worked as a nurse in a field hospital, where a number of Jews were hidden among other patients. She was wounded by a German deserter she encountered while searching for food. She continued to work as a nurse until the Germans left Warsaw, retreating before the advancing Soviet troops.

=== After World War II ===
Sendler's hospital, now at Okęcie, previously supported by Żegota, ran out of resources. She hitchhiked in military trucks to Lublin, to obtain funding from the communist government established there, and then helped Maria Palester to reorganize the hospital as the Warsaw's Children Home. Sendler also resumed other social work activities and quickly advanced within the new structures, in December 1945 becoming head of the Department of Social Welfare in Warsaw's municipal government. She ran her department according to concepts, radical at the time, that she had learned from Helena Radlińska at the Free University.

Sendler and her co-workers gathered all of the records with the names and locations of the hidden Jewish children and gave them to their Żegota colleague Adolf Berman and his staff at the Central Committee of Polish Jews. Almost all of the children's parents had been murdered at the Treblinka extermination camp or had gone missing. Berman and Sendler both felt that the Jewish children should be reunited with "their nation", but argued vehemently about specific aims and methods; most children were taken out of Poland.

Over the years, among Sendler's social and formal functions were a membership in Warsaw City Council, chairmanships of the Commission for Widows and Orphans and of the Health Commission there, activity in the League of Women and in the managing councils of the Society of Friends of Children and the Society for Lay Schools.

Sendler joined the communist Polish Workers' Party in January 1947 and remained a member of its successor, the Polish United Workers' Party, until the party's dissolution in 1990. According to the research done by Anna Bikont, in 1947 Sendler advanced to the party executive by becoming a member of the Social Welfare Section at the Central Committee's Social-Vocational Department. From then she continuously held a succession of high-level party and administrative posts during the entire Stalinist period and beyond, including the jobs of department director in the Ministry of Education from 1953 and of department director in the Ministry of Health in 1958–1962. Especially prior to 1950, Sendler was heavily involved in Central Committee work and party activism, which included implementation of social rules and propagation of ideas dictated by the Stalinist doctrine, and policy enforcement; by engaging in such pursuits, she abandoned some of her previously held views and lost some important acquaintances. After the fall of communism, however, Sendler claimed having been brutally interrogated in 1949 by the Ministry of Public Security, accused of hiding among her employees politically active former members of the Home Army (AK), a resistance organization loyal during the war to the Polish government-in-exile. She attributed the premature birth of her son Andrzej, who did not survive, to such persecution. Anna Bikont quoted Władysław Bartoszewski, who asserted before his death in 2015 that Sendler was not persecuted in communist Poland. Her continuing employment in high-level state positions also speaks against the possibility that she was a subject of serious investigation.

In the Polish People's Republic, Sendler received at least six decorations, including the Gold Cross of Merit (Złoty Krzyż Zasługi) for the wartime saving of Jews in 1946, another Gold Cross of Merit in 1956, and the Knight's Cross of the Order of Polonia Restituta in 1963. Materials dealing with her activities during the war were published, but Sendler became a well-known public personality only after being "rediscovered" by the group from an American high school in 2000 (at the age of ninety). She was recognized by Yad Vashem as one of the Polish Righteous Among the Nations and received her award at the embassy of Israel in Warsaw in 1965, together with Irena Schultz. In 1983 she traveled to Israel, invited by Yad Vashem Institute for the tree-planting ceremony.

From 1962, Sendler worked as deputy director in several Warsaw trade medical schools. At every stage of her career, she worked long hours and was intensely involved in various social work programs, such as helping teenage prostitutes in the ruins of post-war Warsaw recover and return to society, organizing a number of orphanages and care centers for children, families and the elderly, or a center for prostitutes in Henryków. She was known for her effectiveness and displayed a sharp edge when confronted with obstruction or indifference.

Sendler's husband, Stefan Zgrzembski, never shared her enthusiasm for the post-1945 reality. Their marriage kept deteriorating. According to Janina Zgrzembska, their daughter, neither parent paid much attention to the two children. Sendler was entirely consumed by her social work passion and career, at the expense of her own offspring, who were raised by a housekeeper. Around 1956, Sendler asked Teresa Körner, whom she had helped during the war and who was now in Israel, to assist her with immigration to Israel with children, who were Jewish and not safe in Poland. Körner discouraged Sendler's move.

In the spring of 1967, suffering from a variety of health problems, including a heart condition and anxiety disorder, Sendler applied for a disability pension. She was dismissed from the school's vice-principal position in May 1967, shortly before the Arab–Israeli War. From the fall of 1967, she continued working at the same school as a teacher, manager of teacher workshops and librarian, until her 1983 retirement. According to Sendler, in 1967 her daughter Janina was removed from the already published list of students admitted to the University of Warsaw, but Janina reported that she had simply failed to satisfy the admission requirements. The antisemitic campaign of 1967–68 in Poland left Sendler deeply traumatized.

Sendler never told her children of the Jewish origin of their father; Janina Zgrzembska found out as an adult. It wouldn't make any difference, she said: the way they were brought up, race or origin didn't matter.

In 1980, Sendler joined the Solidarity movement. She lived in Warsaw for the remainder of her life. She died on 12 May 2008, aged 98, and is buried in Warsaw's Powązki Cemetery.

== Recognition and remembrance ==
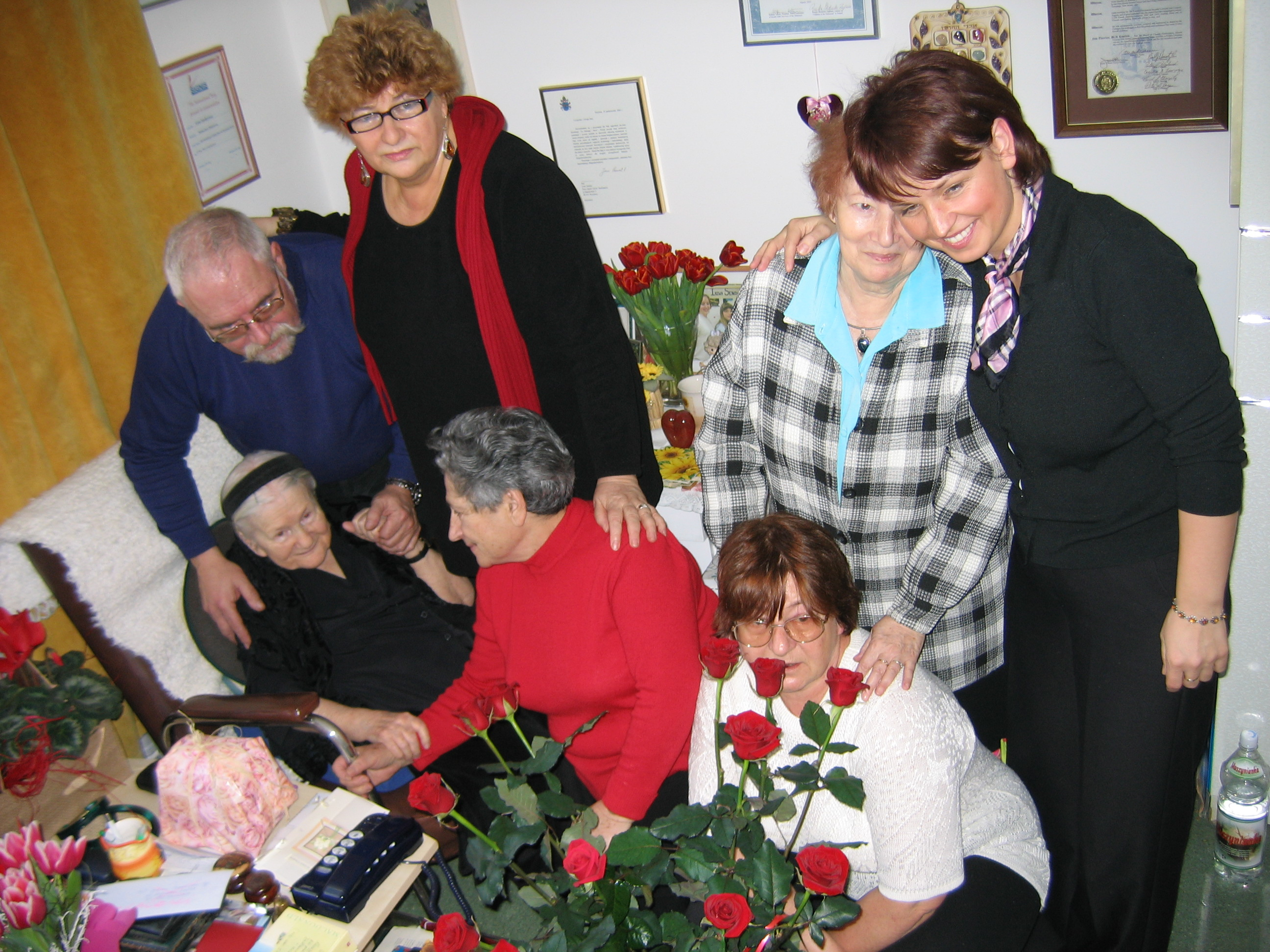
Sendler with some people she saved as children, Warsaw, 2005

In 1965, Sendler was recognized by Yad Vashem as one of the Polish Righteous Among the Nations. In 1983 she was present when a tree was planted in her honor at the Garden of the Righteous Among the Nations.

In 1991, Sendler was made an honorary citizen of Israel. On 12 June 1996, she was awarded the Commander's Cross of the Order of Polonia Restituta. She received a higher version of this award, the Commander's Cross with Star, on 7 November 2001.

Sendler's achievements were largely unknown in North America until 1999, when students at a high school in Uniontown, Kansas, led by their teacher Norman Conard, produced a play based on their research into her life story, which they called Life in a Jar. The play was a surprising success, staged over 200 times in the United States and abroad, and it significantly contributed to publicizing Sendler's story. In March 2002, Temple B'nai Jehudah of Kansas City presented Sendler, Conard, and the students who produced the play with its annual award "for contributions made to saving the world" (Tikkun olam award). The play was adapted for television as The Courageous Heart of Irena Sendler (2009), directed by John Kent Harrison, in which Sendler was portrayed by actress Anna Paquin.

In 2003, Pope John Paul II sent Sendler a personal letter praising her wartime efforts. On 10 November 2003, she received the Order of the White Eagle, Poland's highest civilian decoration, and the Polish-American award, the Jan Karski Award "For Courage and Heart", given by the American Center of Polish Culture in Washington, D.C.

In 2006, Polish NGOs Centrum Edukacji Obywatelskiej and Stowarzyszenie Dzieci Holocaustu, the Ministry of Foreign Affairs of Poland, and the Life in a Jar Foundation established the Irena Sendler's Award "For Repairing the World" (pl:Nagroda imienia Ireny Sendlerowej "Za naprawianie świata"), awarded to Polish and American teachers. The Life in a Jar Foundation is a foundation dedicated to promoting the attitude and message of Irena Sendler.

On 14 March 2007, Sendler was honoured by the Senate of Poland, and a year later, on 30 July, by the United States Congress. On 11 April 2007, she received the Order of the Smile; at that time, she was the oldest recipient of the award. In 2007 she became an honorary citizen of the cities of Warsaw and Tarczyn.

=== Posthumously ===
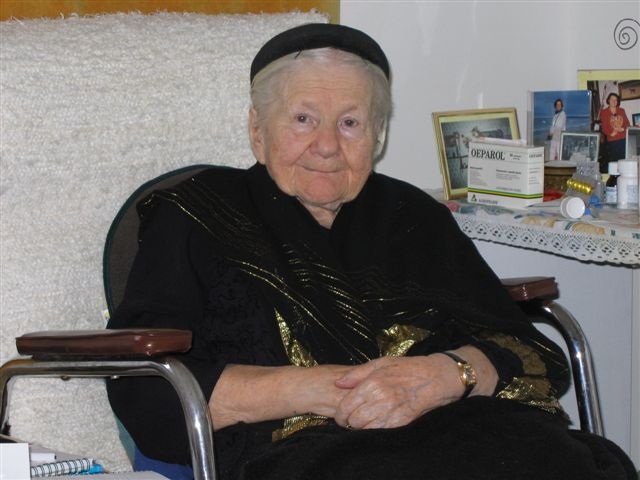
Irena Sendler in 2005

In April 2009 Sendler was posthumously granted the Humanitarian of the Year award from The Sister Rose Thering Endowment, and in May 2009, Sendler was posthumously granted the Audrey Hepburn Humanitarian Award.

Around this time American filmmaker Mary Skinner filmed a documentary, Irena Sendler, In the Name of Their Mothers (Polish: Dzieci Ireny Sendlerowej), featuring the last interviews Sendler gave before her death. The film made its national U.S. broadcast premiere through KQED Presents on PBS in May 2011 in honor of Holocaust Remembrance Day and went on to receive several awards, including the 2012 Gracie Award for outstanding public television documentaries.

In 2010 a memorial plaque commemorating Sendler was added to the wall of 2 Pawińskiego Street in Warsaw – a building in which she worked from 1932 to 1935. In 2015 she was honoured with another memorial plaque at 6 Ludwiki Street, where she lived from the 1930s to 1943. Several schools in Poland have also been named after her.

In 2013 the walkway in front of the POLIN Museum of the History of Polish Jews in Warsaw was named after Sendler.

In 2016, a permanent exhibit was established to honor Sendler's life at the Lowell Milken Center for Unsung Heroes museum, in Fort Scott, KS.

Gal Gadot has been cast to play Sendler in a historic thriller written by Justine Juel Gillmer and produced by Pilot Wave.

On 15 February 2020 Google celebrated her 110th birthday with a Google Doodle.

In 2021 a statue of her in Newark, Nottinghamshire, was announced.

=== Literature ===
In 2010, Polish historian Anna Mieszkowska wrote a biography Irena Sendler: Mother of the Children of the Holocaust. In 2011, Jack Mayer tells the story of the four Kansas school girls and their discovery of Irena Sendler in his novel Life in a Jar: The Irena Sendler Project.

In 2016, Irena's Children, a book about Sendler written by Tilar J. Mazzeo, was released by Simon & Schuster. A version adapted to be read by children was created by Mary Cronk Farell. The young reader's edition was named as a notable book for older readers by the Sydney Taylor Book Award. Another children's picture book titled Jars of Hope: How One Woman Helped Save 2,500 Children During the Holocaust, is written by Jennifer Roy and illustrated by Meg Owenson.

Sendlerowa. W ukryciu ('Sendler: In Hiding'), a biography and book about the people and events related to Sendler's wartime activities, was written by Anna Bikont and published in 2017. The book received the 2018 Ryszard Kapuściński Award for Literary Reportage.

== Gallery ==
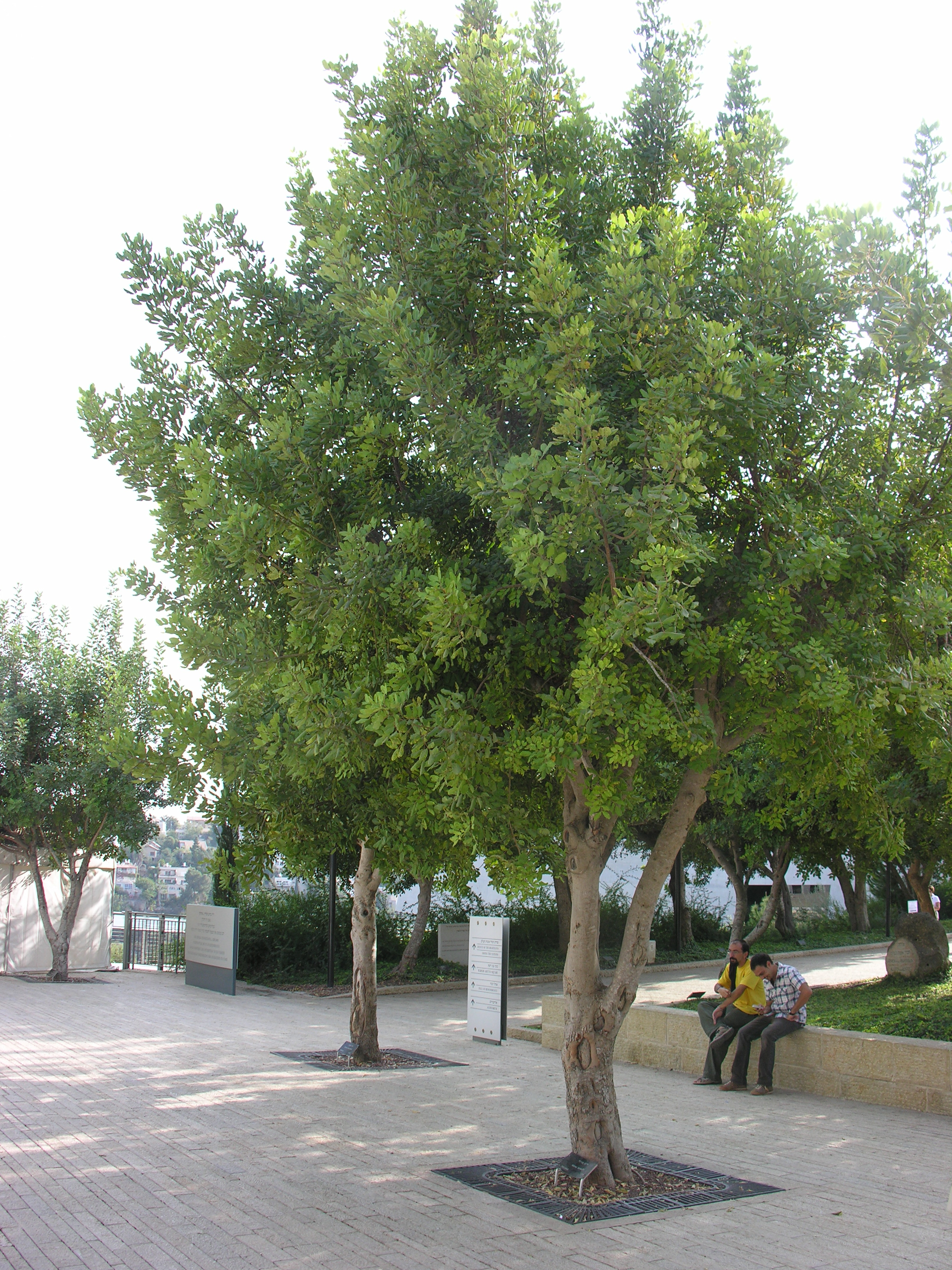
Irena Sendler's tree on the Avenue of the Righteous at Yad Vashem in Israel

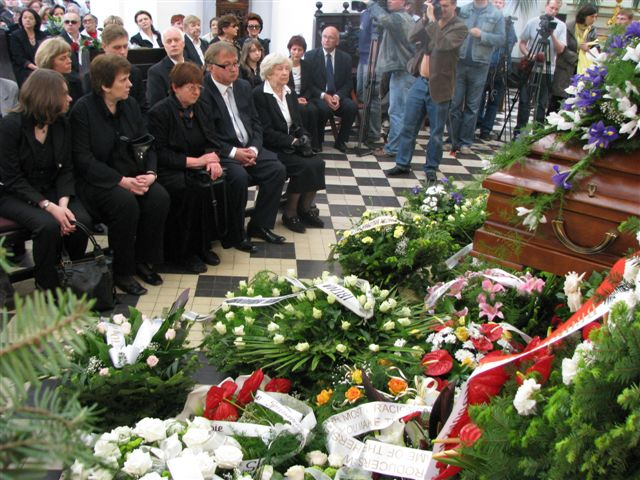
Irena Sendler's funeral, May 2008

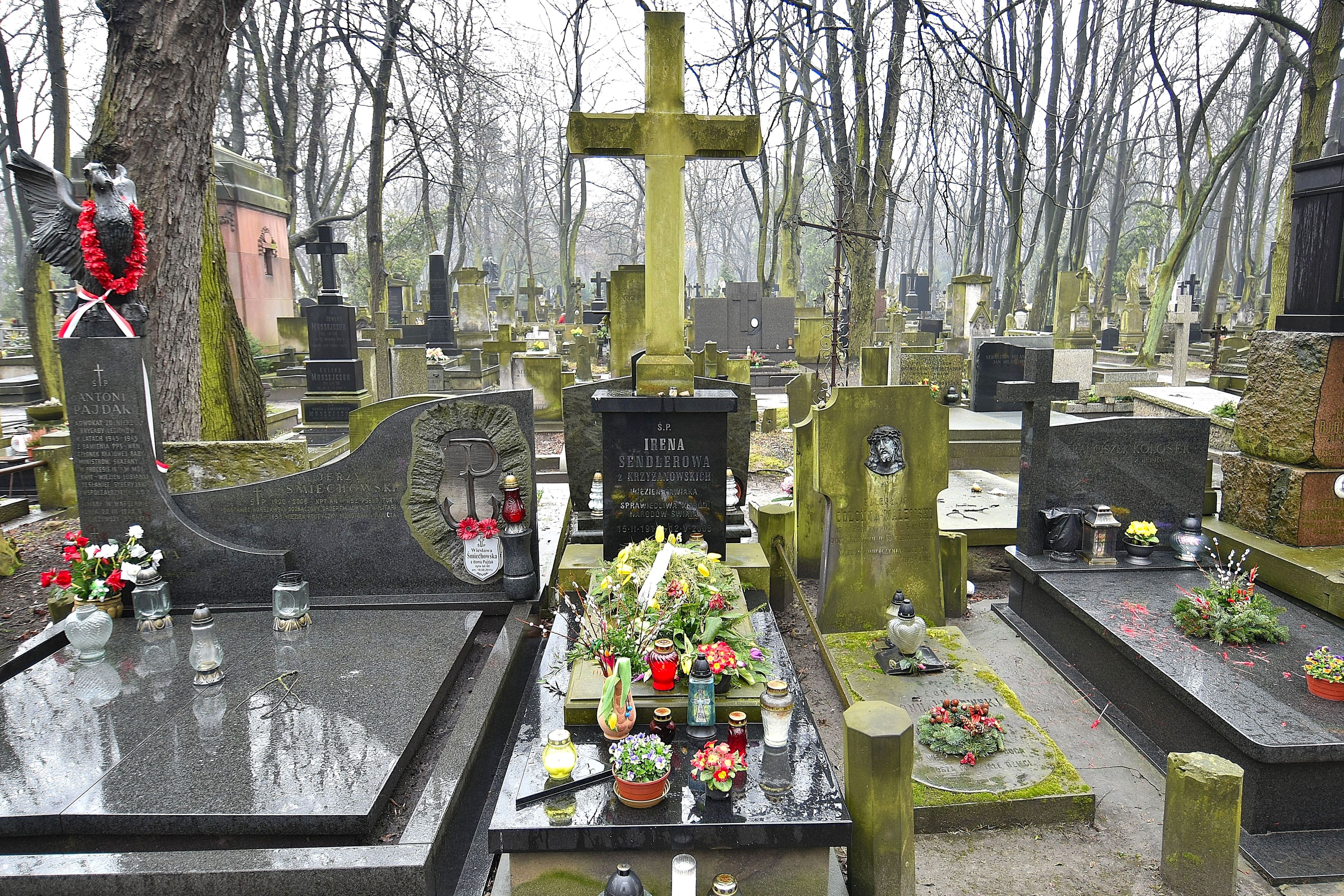
Irena Sendler's grave in Warsaw's Powązki Cemetery

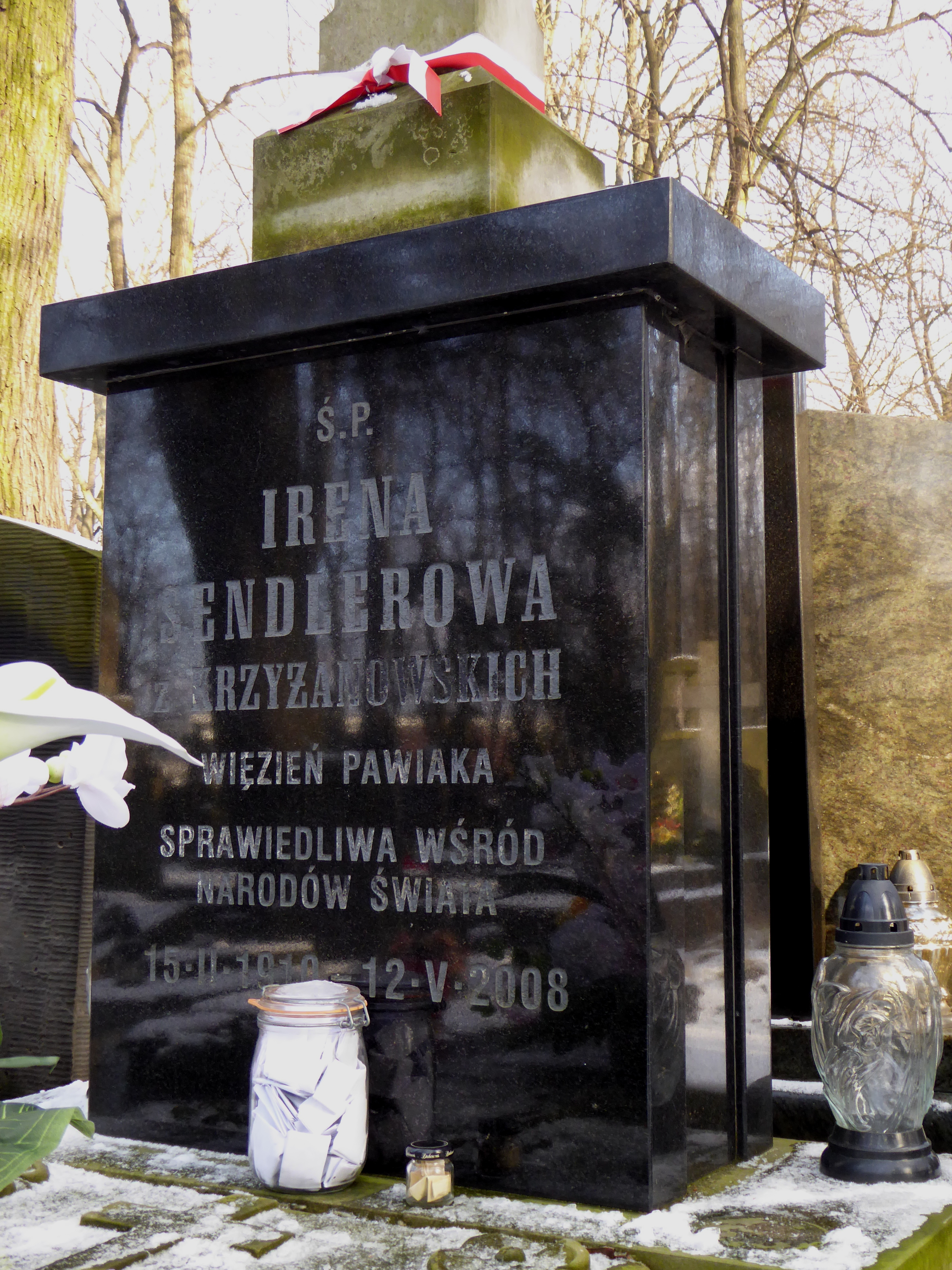
The headstone on Irena Sendler's grave

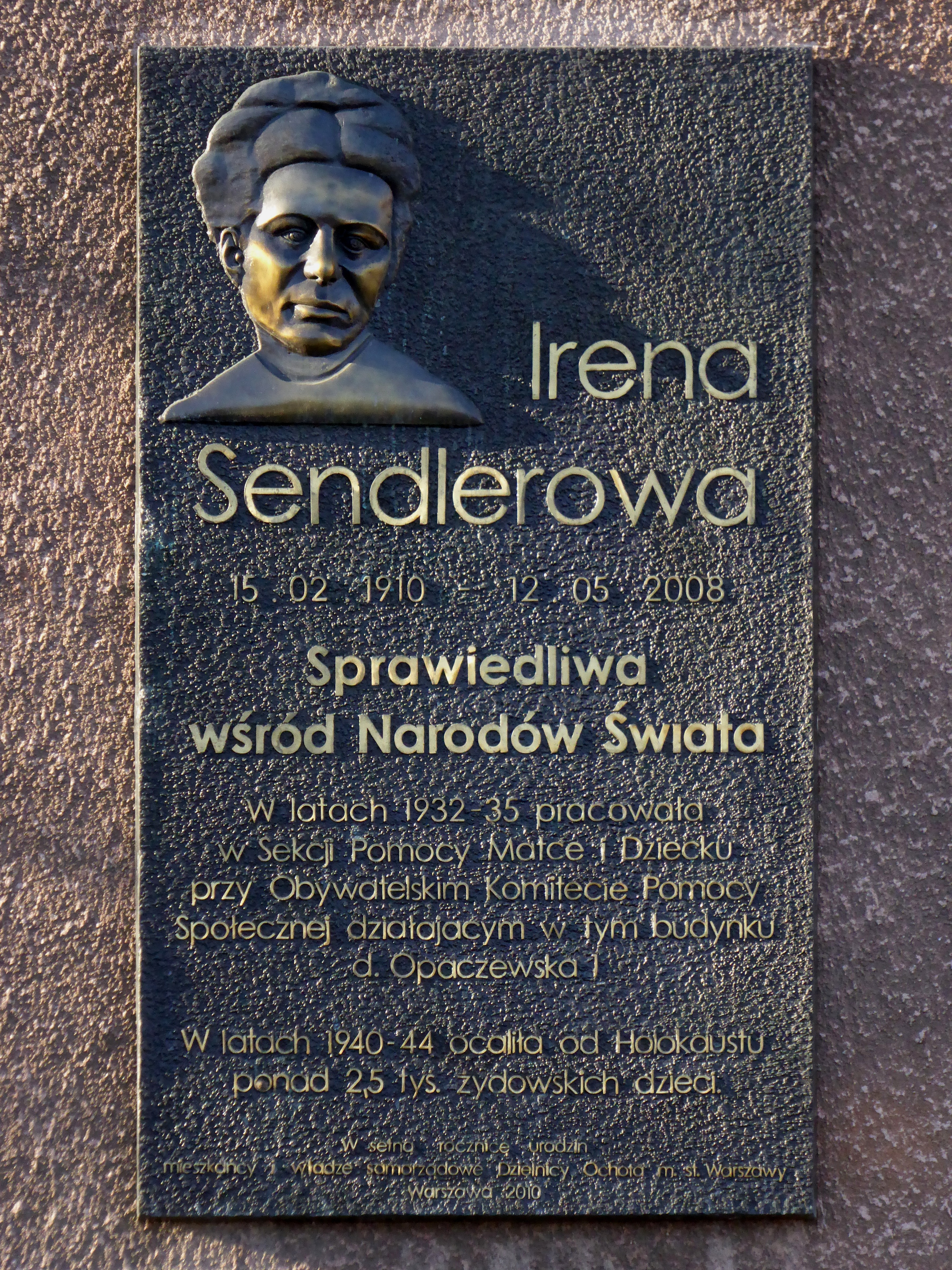
A memorial plaque on the wall of 2 Pawińskiego Street in Warsaw

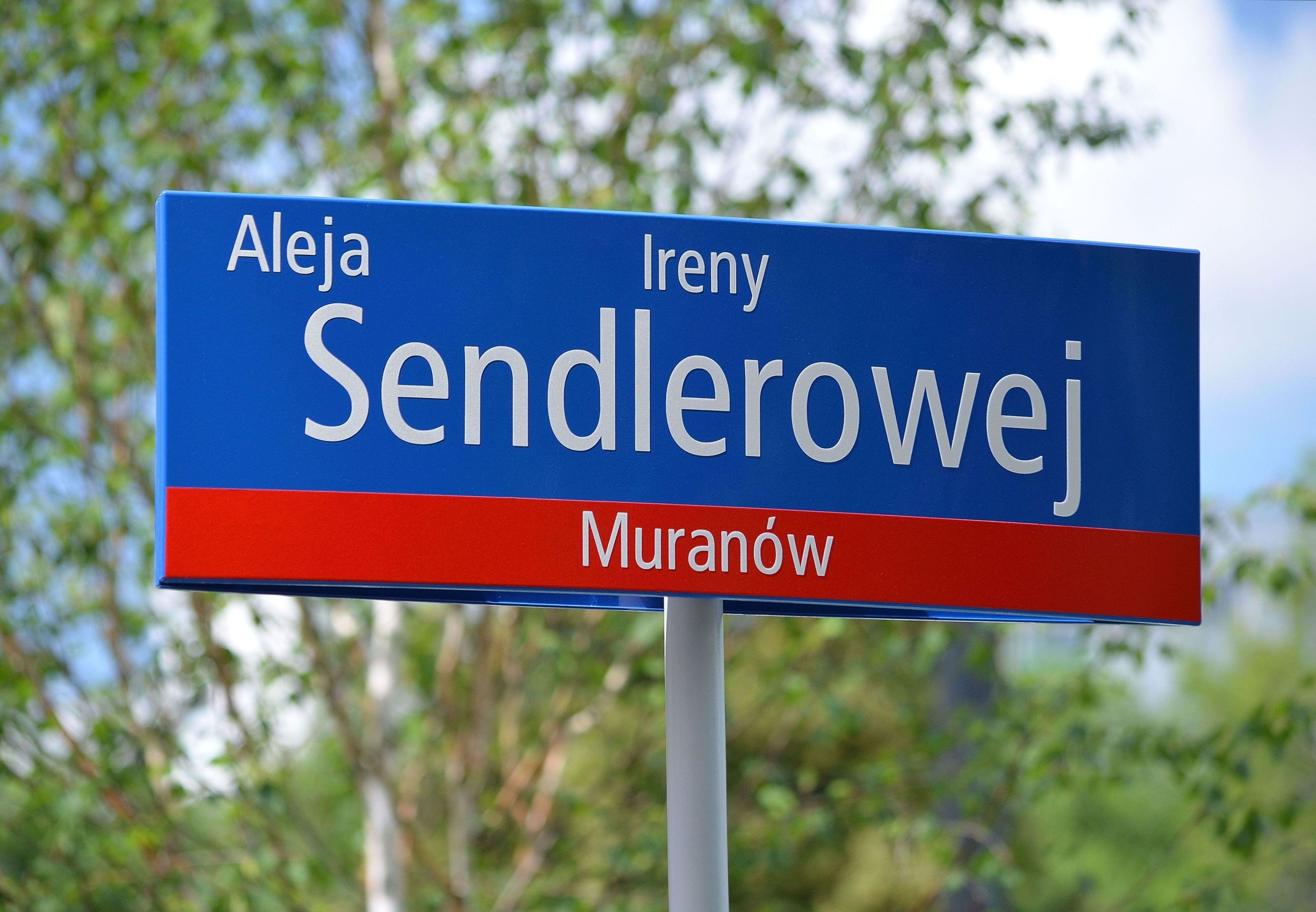
The walkway in front of the POLIN Museum of the History of Polish Jews named after Irena Sendler

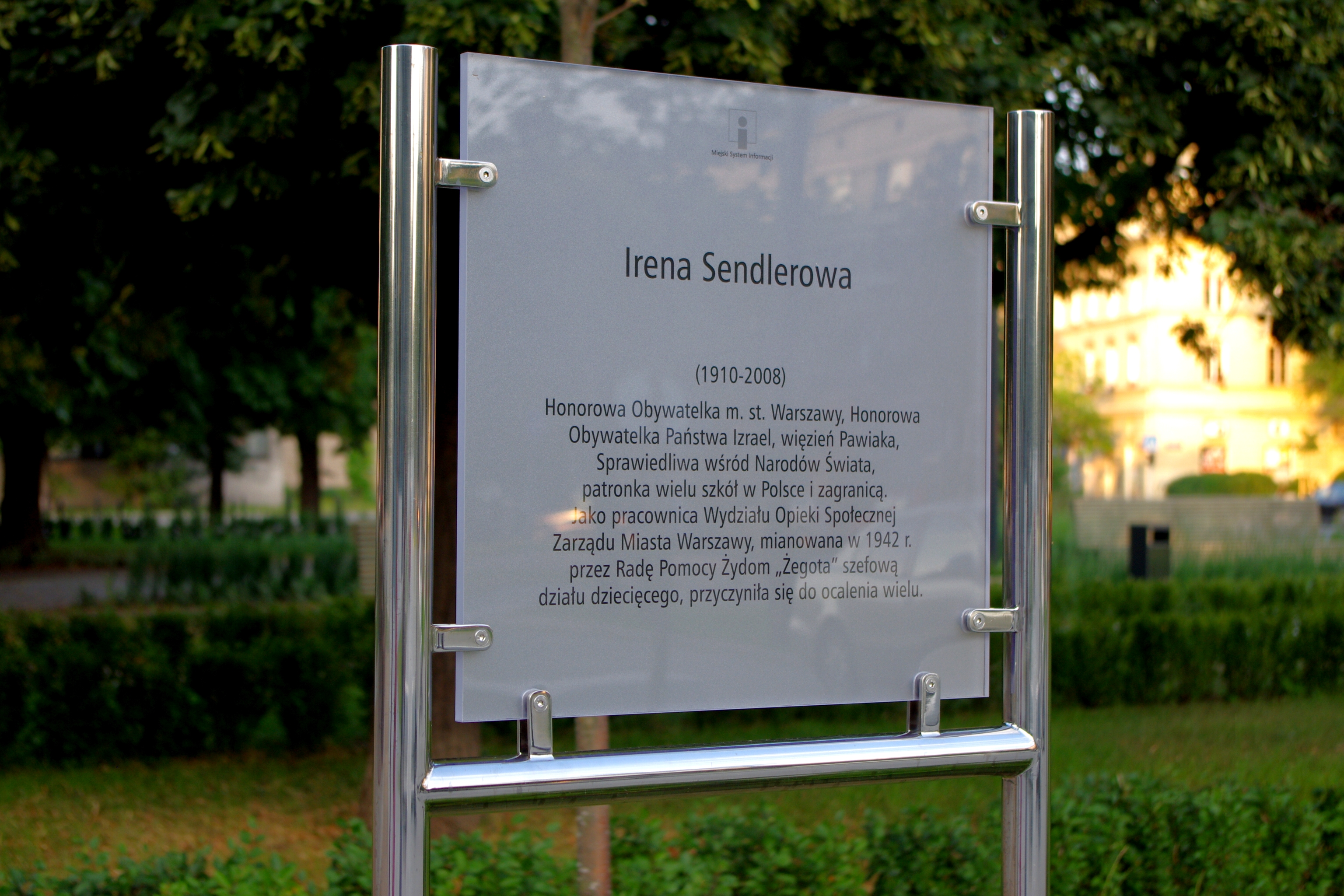
Irena Sendler Avenue

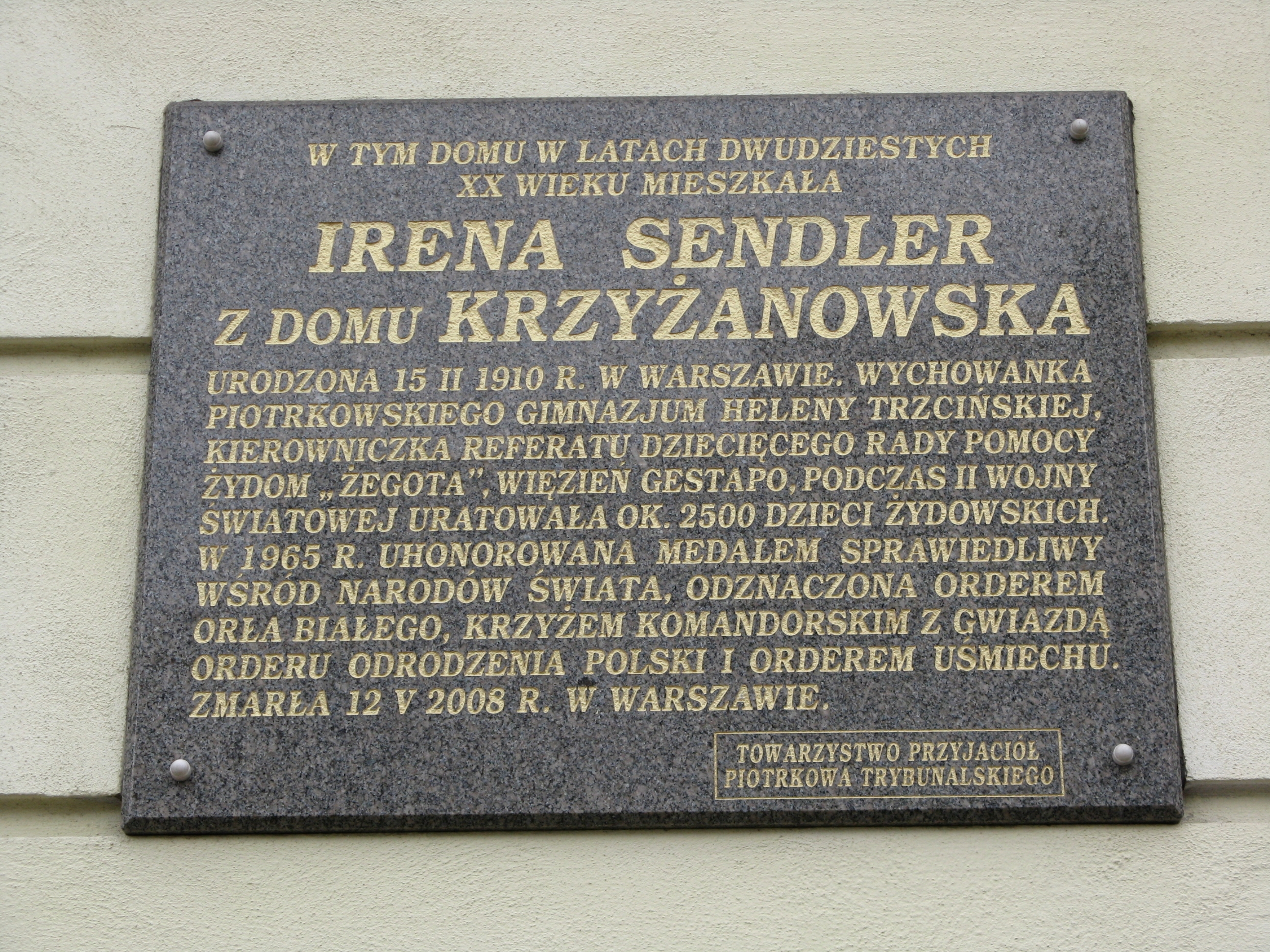
A bronze plaque in Piotrków Trybunalski telling some of her story

== See also ==
- The Holocaust in Poland
- List of Poles: Holocaust resisters
- Polish Righteous Among the Nations
- Rescue of Jews during the Holocaust
  - Rescue of Jews by Poles during the Holocaust

== Bibliography ==
- Bikont, Anna (2017). Sendlerowa. W ukryciu [Sendler: In Hiding] (in Polish). Wydawnictwo Czarne, Wołowiec. ISBN 978-83-8049-609-5.
- Halberstam, Yitta; Leventhal, Judith (13 August 2008). Small Miracles of the Holocaust (1st ed.). The Lyons Press. ISBN 978-1-59921-407-8.
- Lukas, Richard. Forgotten Survivors: Polish Christians Remember the Nazi Occupation. ISBN 978-0-7006-1350-2.
- Mieszkowska, Anna (18 November 2010). Irena Sendler: Mother of the Holocaust Children. Praeger. ISBN 978-0-313-38593-3.
- Paldiel, Mordecai (January 1993). The Path of the Righteous: Gentile Rescuers of Jews During the Holocaust. Ktav Publishing House. ISBN 9780881253764.
- Tomaszewski, Irene; Werblowski, Tecia. Zegota: The Council to Aid Jews in Occupied Poland 1942–1945. Price-Patterson. ISBN 1-896881-15-7.
