= European Book Prize =

- Awarded for: promoting European values, and contributing to European citizens' better understanding of the European Union as a cultural entity
- Location: European Union
- Presented by: Esprit d'Europe
- Reward: €10,000
- First award: 2007; 19 years ago
- Currently held by: Karl Schlögel for Ukraine: a nation on the borderland (2024)
- Website: livre-europeen.eu

The European Book Prize (French: Le Prix du Livre Européen) is a European Union literary award established in 2007. It is organized by the association Esprit d'Europe in Paris. It seeks to promote European values, and to contribute to European citizens' better understanding of the European Union as a cultural entity.

Eligible books must have been published in one of the 27 European Union (EU) member-states in the preceding year, in the original language or a translation. Works are submitted in one of two categories: essai (which in French means, something broader than the English "essay") and romans et récits ("novels and narratives"). A long list is drawn up by the organizers in Paris; the number varies but for example, in 2011, there were 50 essais plus 47 romans et recits. These are then sent to a "sponsorship committee" which narrows it down to about a seven title shortlist, which are then given to a new committee of judges, composed of journalists and authors.

The European Book Prize was founded by France Rouqe, Luce Perrot and François-Xavier Priollaud. The prize is worth 10,000 euros to each winner. The first two years saw only one winner who received 20,000 euros.

== Winners ==
The inaugural European Book Prize was awarded to Belgium's prime minister Guy Verhofstadt for United States of Europe. The ceremony was held at the European Parliament in Brussels on 5 December 2007.

Swedish crime fiction writer Henning Mankell handed the prize to the winner. While giving the prize, Mankell said that the jury was sensitive to the political courage showed by the current prime minister of Belgium. He added that in a Europe which has a lot of self-doubt, which has a lot of questions about its own future, Guy Verhofstadt offered a clear proposal for the future. He gave reasons to believe in European constitution.

While receiving the reward, Verhofstadt said, "When I wrote this book, I in fact meant it as a provocation against all those who didn't want the European Constitution. Fortunately, in the end a solution was found with the treaty, that was approved."

Year	Category	English title	Original title	Author	Nationality	Ref(s)
2007	Essay	United States of Europe	De Verenigde Staten van Europa: manifest voor een nieuw Europa	Guy Verhofstadt	Belgium	
2008	Essay	Postwar: A History of Europe Since 1945		Tony Judt	United Kingdom	
2009	Novel	Gottland	Gottland	Mariusz Szczygieł	Poland	
2009	Essay	Europe for Dummies	L'Europe pour les Nuls	Sylvie Goulard	France	
2010	Novel	Purge	Puhdistus	Sofi Oksanen	Finland	
2010	Essay	Beauty and the Inferno	La bellezza e l'inferno	Roberto Saviano	Italy	
2011	Novel	Red Love: The Story of an East German Family	Haltet euer Herz bereit: eine ostdeutsche Familiengeschichte	Maxim Leo	Germany	
2011	Essay	The Crime and the Silence	My z Jedwabnego	Anna Bikont	Poland	
2012	Novel	Madonna on the moon	Wie die Madonna auf den Mond kam	Rolf Bauerdick	Germany	
2012	Essay	Europe’s passage	De passage naar Europa. Geschiedenis van een begin	Luuk van Middelaar	Netherlands	
2013	Novel	An Englishman in Madrid	Riña de gatos	Eduardo Mendoza	Spain	
2013	Essay	The French, gravediggers of the euro	Ces Français, fossoyeurs de l’euro	Arnaud Leparmentier	France	
2014	Novel	Hannah's Dress	La robe de Hannah: Berlin 1904–2014	Pascale Hugues	France	
2014	Essay	Turbulent and Mighty Continent		Anthony Giddens	United Kingdom	
2015	Novel		Vera	Jean-Pierre Orban	Belgium	
2015	Essay	Enraged Citizens, European Peace and Democratic Deficits	Der Europäische Landbote: Die Wut der Bürger und der Friede Europas	Robert Menasse	Austria	
2016	Novel	The Impostor	El impostor	Javier Cercas	Spain	
2016	Essay		Il più e il meno	Erri De Luca	Italy	
2017	Novel		Zink	David Van Reybrouck	Belgium	
2017	Essay		Come la democrazia fallisce	Raffaele Simone	Italy	
2018	Novel	Those Who Forget	Les Amnésiques	Géraldine Schwarz	Germany	
2018	Essay	Orbán: Europe's New Strongman		Paul Lendvai	Austria	
2018	Jury prize	East West Street: On the Origins of Genocide and Crimes Against Humanity		Philippe Sands	United Kingdom	
2019	Novel	Middle England		Jonathan Coe	United Kingdom	
2019	Essay		Nous l’Europe, banquet des peuples	Laurent Gaudé	France	
2020	Novel	It Happened on the First of September (or Some Other Time)	Stalo sa prvého septembra (alebo inokedy)	Pavol Rankov	Slovakia	
2020	Jury prize	Border. A Journey to the Edge of Europe		Kapka Kassabova	Bulgaria	
2021	Novel	Niki	Νίκη	Christos Chomenidis	Greece	
2022	Novel		M. L'uomo della provvidenza	Antonio Scurati	Italy	
2023	Novel		Die Erweiterung	Robert Menasse	Austria	
2024	Novel	Ukraine: a nation on the borderland	Entscheidung in Kiew. Ukrainische Lektionen	Karl Schlögel	Germany	
2025	Novel		El loco de Dios en el fin del mundo	Javier Cercas	Spain	

- In 2023, Robert Menasse became the first laureate to be awarded the prize for two different books (in 2015 and 2023)
