= Stanisław Krzyżanowski =

Polish physician (1874–1917)

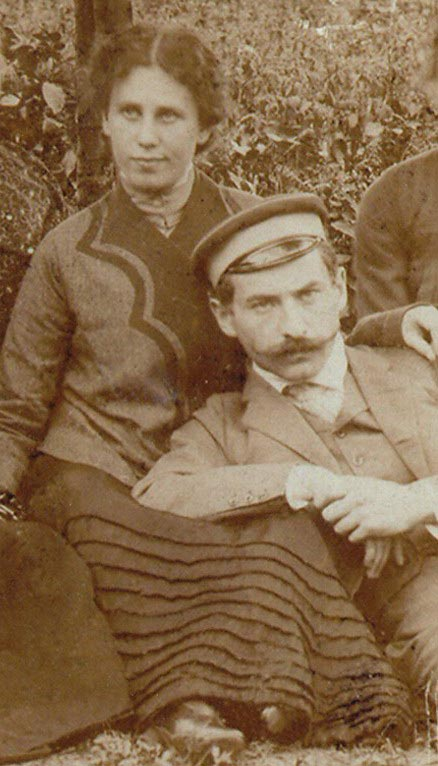
- Krzyżanowski with his wife Janina
- Born: 29 October 1874; Tarczyn, Congress Poland, Russian Empire
- Died: 10 February 1917 (aged 42); Otwock, Congress Poland, Russian Empire
- Occupation: Medical doctor
- Spouse: Janina Karolina Grzybowska
- Children: Irena Sendler

Stanisław Henryk Krzyżanowski (29 October 1874 – 10 February 1917) was a Polish physician. Alternate birth (1877) and death dates (10 November 1917) are given on the Otwock-History blog. He was among the earliest members of the Polish Socialist Party (PSP).

Krzyżanowski, was a doctor, who mostly treated poor Jewish people. During an outbreak of typhus in 1917 among his Jewish patients, Krzyżanowski eventually contracted the disease and subsequently died from its complications. His wife's name was Janina.

Krzyżanowski's life and politics had a profound impact on his daughter Irena Sendler. At great personal risk, she was instrumental in rescuing over 2,500 Jewish babies and children from the Warsaw Ghetto in 1942 during the German occupation of Poland.
