= Pascale Hugues =

French journalist and writer (born 1959)

- Born: 1959 (age 66–67); Strasbourg, France
- Occupations: Journalist, writer
- Writing career
- Language: French
- Genre: Journalism

Pascale Hugues (born 1959) is a French journalist and writer based in Berlin, Germany.

== Life ==
Hugues was born in Strasbourg into family with French and German ancestry. From 1984 to 1988 she worked as radio moderator and as journalist for BBC World Service in the United Kingdom and from 1986 to 1989 as foreign correspondent for the French newspaper Libération. From 1989 to 1995 she worked as foreign correspondent in Bonn and Berlin. After that she settled in Berlin, where she continued to work as a journalist for various French and German newspapers. She also published a number of nonfiction books and was the author of documentaries for the TV network Arte.

Hugues resides in Berlin and was married to Thomas Kufus with whom she had two children.

== Works ==
- Le bonheur allemand (1999)
- Marthe et Mathilde : L’Histoire vraie d'une incroyable amitié, 1902-2001. Les Arènes, Paris 2008
- Rue tranquille dans beau quartier
- La Robe de Hannah : Berlin 1904-2014, Les Arènes, Paris 2014
  English edition: Hannah’s Dress. Berlin 1904-2014. Polity Press, Cambridge 2017, translated by C. Jon Delogu
- Was ist das? Chroniques d'une Française à Berlin, Les Arènes, Paris 2017
- L’école des filles, Les Arènes, Paris 2021
- Si pleine de vie, Les Arènes, Paris 2026.

== Filmography ==
- Bleiben oder gehen? (Staying or leaving). Arte, 2001 - documentary about the youth in East Germany after the reunification
- Alte Liebe rostet nicht (Old Love doesn't rust). Arte, 2003 - documentary about the Franco-German Friendship

== Awards ==
- 2006: Chevalier de l’ordre national de Mérite for her contribution to the Franco-German Friendship
- 2014: European Book Prize for La robe de Hannah. Berlin 1904–2014
