= The Crime and the Silence =

2004 book by Anna Bikont

The Crime and the Silence: Confronting the Massacre of Jews in Wartime Jedwabne
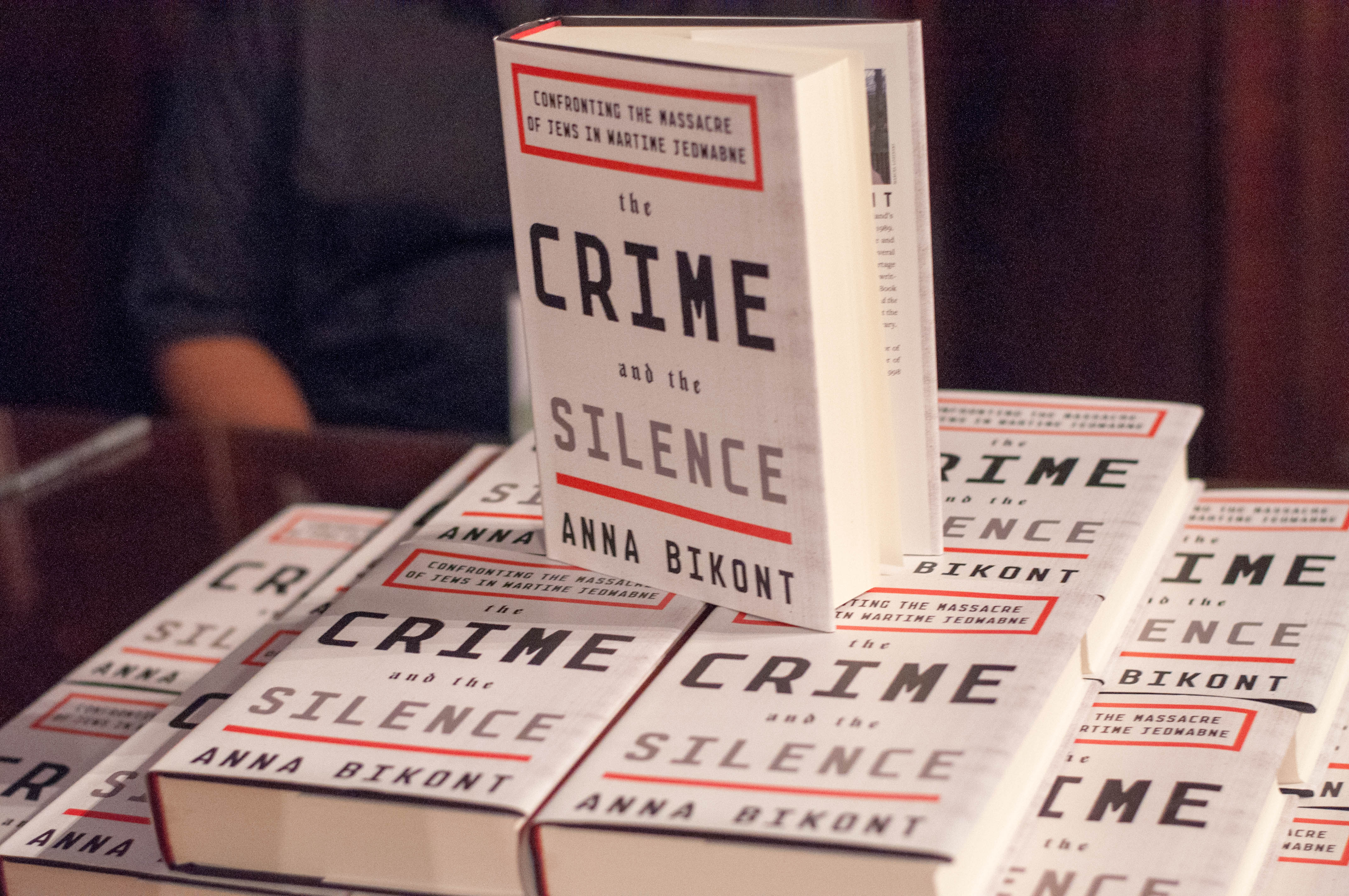
- Author: Anna Bikont
- Original title: My z Jedwabnego
- Language: Polish
- Subject: Jedwabne pogrom
- Genre: Journalistic investigation, historical studies
- Publisher: Prószyński i S-ka
- Publication date: 2004
- Pages: 417
- Awards: European Book Prize (2011)
- ISBN: 9788373376946

The Crime and the Silence: Confronting the Massacre of Jews in Wartime Jedwabne is a 2004 book by Polish journalist Anna Bikont on the Jedwabne massacre, a 1941 pogrom of Polish Jews in Jedwabne, German-occupied Poland.

== Content ==
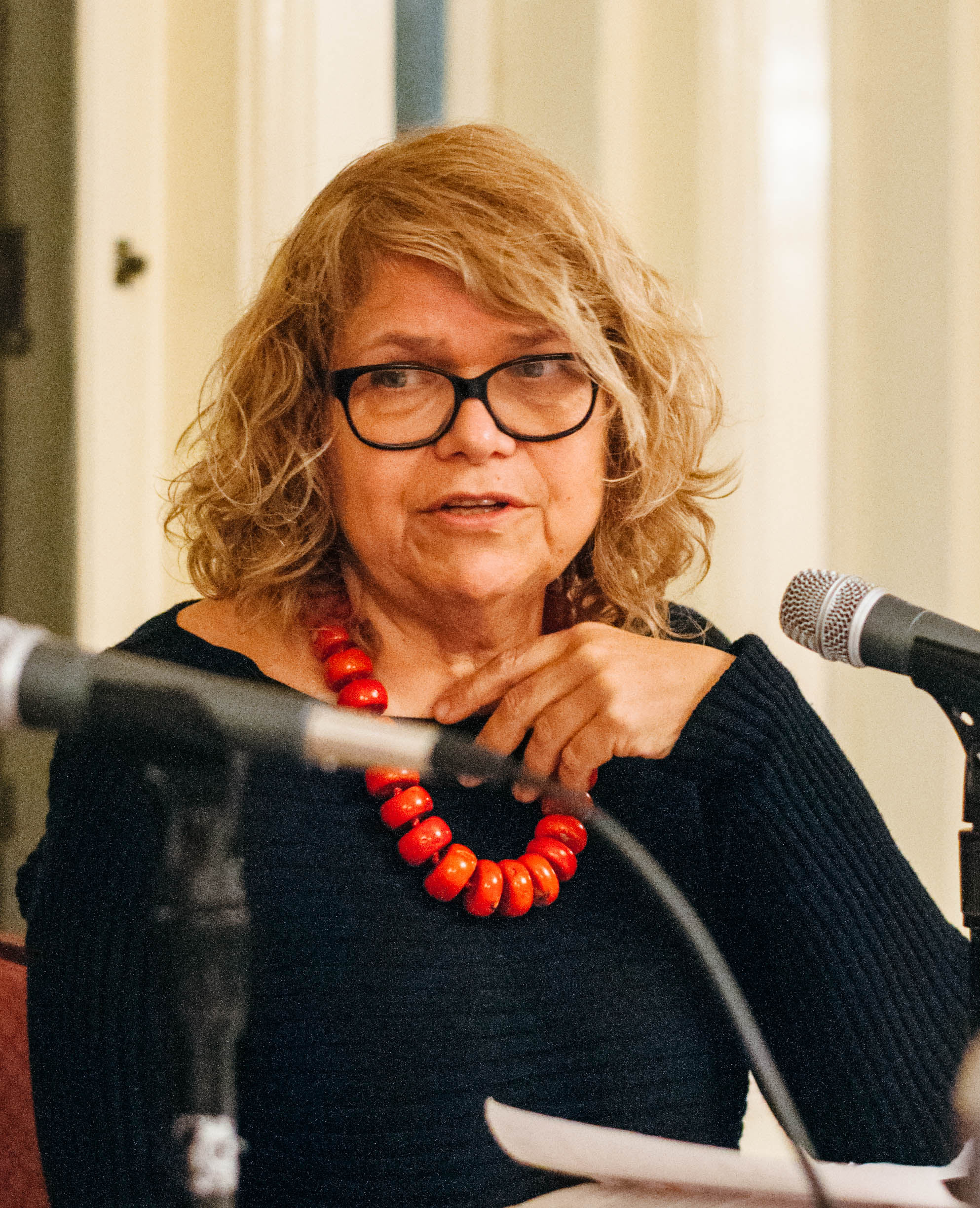
Bikont at a reading of The Crime and the Silence at Boston University in 2015

The book was first published in Polish as My z Jedwabnego (2004, "Jedwabne: Battlefield of Memory"). It was next published in French under the title Le Crime et le Silence: Jedwabne 1941, la mémoire d'un pogrom dans la Pologne d'aujourd'hui (2011) which won the European Book Prize. The English translation by Alissa Valles was published in 2015. Other translations include: in Swedish as Vi från Jedwabne (2015); in Hebrew as Anaḥnu mi-Yedṿabneh : ha-peshaʻ ṿe-ha-hashtaḳah (2016); in Dutch as De misdaad en het zwijgen : Jedwabne 1941, de levende herinnering aan een pogrom in Polen (2016); in Chinese as Zui xing yu chen mo : Zhi mian ye de wa bu nei you tai ren da tu sha (2018); in Italian as Il crimine e il silenzio: Jedwabne 1941 - Un massacro in cerca di verità (2019), and; in German as Wir aus Jedwabne: Polen und Juden während der Shoah (2020).

In writing her book Bikont was inspired by Jan. T. Gross' pioneering study on the subject (Neighbors: The Destruction of the Jewish Community in Jedwabne, Poland, 2001). One of the novel areas she explores is the reaction of Jedwabne villagers to Gross' revelations, what one of the reviewers called "the early stage of the Jedwabne debate". One of the themes of her book is the lingering antisemitism present in modern-day Jedwabne, where a number of inhabitants were unwilling to take part in her research project and yet others were afraid to be seen speaking to her. Readings of her book in Poland have been picketed by Polish nationalists.

The book is structured with interposing chapters of Bikont's diary (written in the years 2000–2003) and journalistic reportage. Pursuing some leads and interviews, Bikont traveled among others to United States, Israel, Costa Rica and Argentina.

== Reception ==
Louis Begley in his review for The New York Times wrote that the book is "beautifully written, devastating and very important". A reviewer for The Guardian likewise called the book "a powerful and important study of the poisonous effects of racism and hatred within a community". Sinclair McKay reviewing the book for The Telegraph noted that the book "is a hauntingly human study of the nightmare of persecution", though criticized it for insufficient historical background and lacking a map that many readers would find useful.

Joanna Michlic reviewed the Polish edition, praising it as "a first-class journalistic account" recommended for students, scholars of the 20th century genocides as well as to those interested in the Polish-Jewish history, noting that the book's main contribution is to be found in the "investigation of contemporary memory of these crimes" among the survivors, perpetrators, rescuers and their descendants. She calls the book "an anthropological and a psychological study of a deeply troubling memory of the darkest crimes in the history of Polish-Jewish relations" and notes that while the author is a journalist, it is an exemplary journalistic study that is valuable to scholars pursuing historical studies in this topic area.

Yves Gounin reviewed the French edition for Médiations. He compared the book to The Lost: A Search for Six of Six Million by Daniel Mendelsohn, noting that Bikont's account in French unfortunately suffers from translation problems.

Reviewing the book for the Jewish Quarterly, Jennifer Weisberg calls the book a "masterpiece", praising Bikont for her efforts to gather numerous testimonies from surviving witnesses.
