= Nexus Instituut =

Dutch cultural heritage organization

The Nexus Institute, officially in Dutch Nexus Instituut, is a Dutch organisation that studies the European cultural heritage in its artistic, philosophical and spiritual context, to thus offer insight into contemporary questions and to shape the cultural-philosophical debate. Three times a year, the institute publishes Nexus, an essayistic magazine in book form. In addition, the organization annually organizes a Nexus Lecture, a Nexus Conference, symposia, and masterclasses. Speakers include renowned philosophers, artists, scientists, and politicians such as Elisabeth Mann Borgese, Richard Holbrooke, Michael Ignatieff, Daniel Barenboim, George Steiner, Mario Vargas Llosa, John Maxwell Coetzee, Sonia Gandhi, Susan Sontag, Richard Rorty, Emmanuel Macron, Garry Kasparov, Anne Applebaum, Jeb Bush, and Amos Oz.

== History ==
The magazine Nexus was founded in 1991 by cultural philosopher Rob Riemen, and the Nexus Institute emerged from it in 1994. The institute started as an independent institution based at the Tilburg University, where the first lectures were held in the auditorium and the first Nexus Conference, featuring internationally renowned speakers such as György Konrád, Avishai Margalit, Peter Sellars, Ian Buruma, Allan Janik, and Eva Hoffman, took place in the spring of 1996.

In 2004, in the context of the Dutch Presidency of the EU, Nexus was commissioned to organize a series of international conferences: the kick-off in the Ridderzaal (Hall of Knights), working conferences in Warsaw, Berlin, and Washington, and a public closing event in Rotterdam. Speakers included Jacqueline de Romilly, Mario Vargas Llosa, and the then-President of the European Commission José Manuel Barroso.

In 2017, the Nexus Lecture was organized in Tilburg for the last time. As of 2018, the institute moved to Amsterdam, where it has already been organising the Nexus symposia and conferences for years.

== Activities ==
Public activities centered on the major questions, confronting current events with the European humanistic tradition.

=== Nexus Conference ===
This conference is the largest activity Nexus organises annually. An opening lecture by a famous thinker is followed by a public discussion among artists, philosophers, politicians, and scientists, addressing questions about life and society. How can we change the world? What are the consequences of the triumph of science and technology? How civilized are we actually? Who is truly educated?

=== Nexus Symposium ===
The symposium is a public conversation in a small circle about subjects such as the Holocaust and the power of music, about nationalism and fascism, about the beauty of the arts, and questions like what it means to be a European and what is the role of intellectuals in politics? For example, Patti Smith spoke at a symposium in 2018 about upbringing in a counterculture.

=== Nexus Lecture ===
The lecture brings the vision of a prominent intellectual on our society, art and culture, on our history and future. In September 1994, Edward Said gave the first Nexus Lecture. Since then, the lecture series has offered a platform to, among others, George Steiner, Elisabeth Mann Borgese, Sonia Gandhi, Jürgen Habermas, Daniel Barenboim, Simon Schama, Garry Kasparov, Emmanuel Macron, and Wynton Marsalis.

=== Nexus Masterclass ===
For young people and students, an international speaker – Michael Sandel, Sherry Turkle, Sidney Blumenthal, Salam Fayyad – introduces an urgent topic, from education and social media to genetic manipulation and politics. Afterward, the speaker engages in discussion with the students in the audience.

== Publications ==
=== Nexus Magazine ===
The Nexus Institute publishes the magazine in book form Nexus three times a year, featuring both classic and contemporary essays. Some editions are a reflection of the Nexus activities, where the speakers submit an essay afterward. Each edition has a central theme on which various experts from different fields and parts of the world reflect. The anniversary editions Nexus 65, ‘The University of Life,’ and Nexus 70, ‘The Return of Europe,’ were published as hardcover editions.

=== Nexus Library ===
The bound, bilingual volumes of the Nexus Library contain reflections by influential thinkers. This series includes Universitas? and The Idea of Europe by George Steiner, My Time by Thomas Mann, and A Political Life by Sonia Gandhi. The poet Adam Zagajewski and conductor Daniel Barenboim also contributed to the series.
