= Talking Dog =

Spoken magazine held monthly at the Piękny Pies club in Kraków from 2010 until 2015

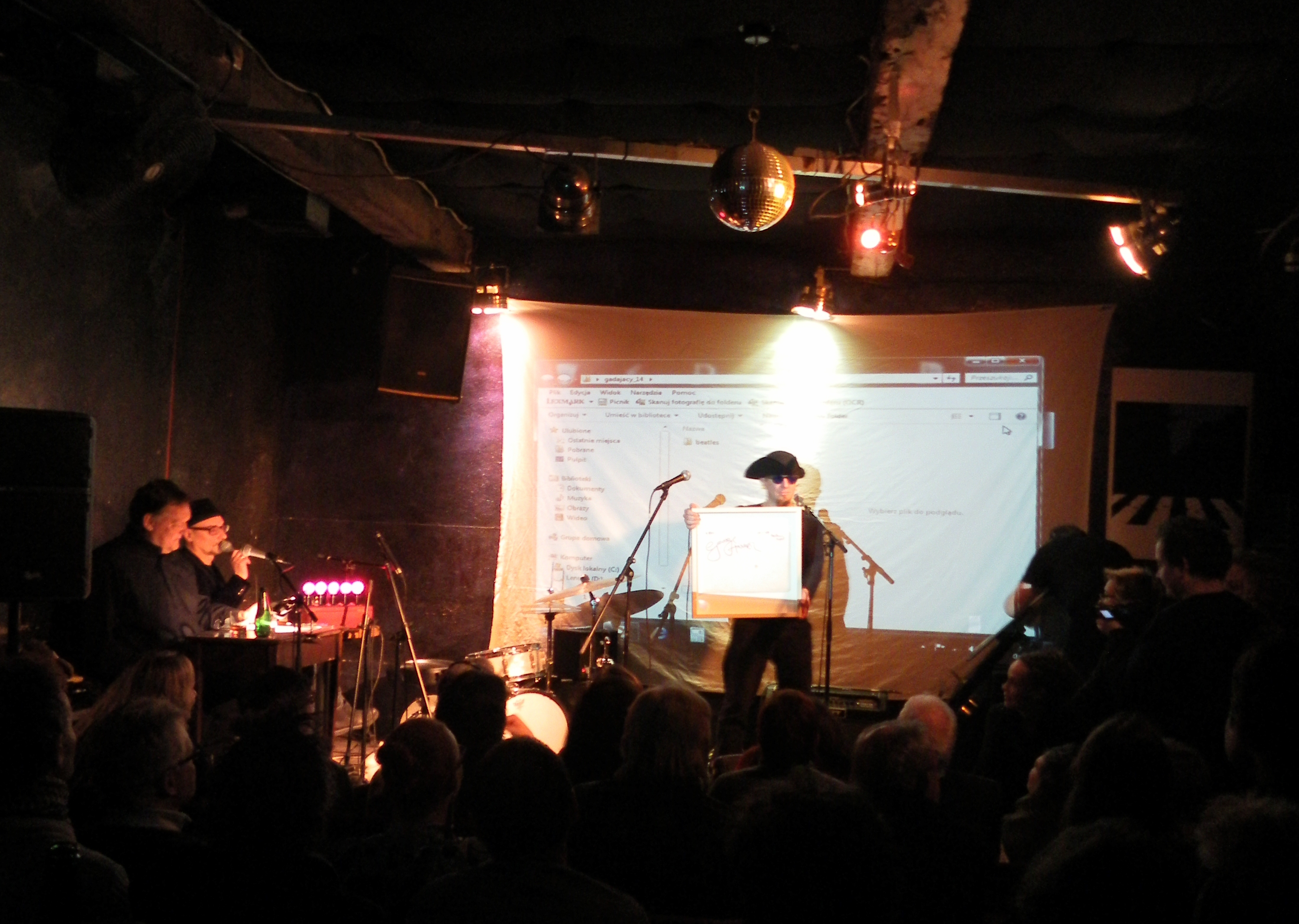
14th edition of "Gadający Pies". Aleksander Janicki on the stage, on the left Maciej Piotr Prus and Piotr Bikont.

The Talking Dog (Polish: Gadający Pies) was a spoken magazine held monthly at the Piękny Pies (Beautiful Dog) club in Kraków from the second half of 2010 until March 2015, described as "an anthropological talking magazine". It was led by Piotr Bikont and Maciej Piotr Prus. Editorial staff of the magazine included both masters of the ceremony (Prus and Bikont), and also Aleksander Janicki, Edward Pasewicz, Andrzej Pilichowski Ragno, Jorgos Skolias and Marcin Świetlicki. Since the premiere, Gadający Pies had 31 editions.

== History ==
The first edition of Gadający Pies took place in the second half of 2010. In November 2011 a special episode titled Gadająca Suka (The Talking Bitch) was held. The magazine suspended its activity from April until December 2012. It was reactivated in January 2013.

Each edition of Gadający Pies contained performances by musicians, poets, writers and scientists. Each performer had only five minutes to do the show. Prus, who was the master of the ceremony, kept five red lamps and has been consistently turning each lamp off after one minute of the performance.

Among people who regularly appeared on the stage within Gadający Pies were Marcin Baran, Miłosz Biedrzycki, Wojciech Bonowicz, Paweł Głowacki, Maciej Miezian and Jerzy Vetulani. Guest stars have included Paulina Bisztyga, Rafał Dutkiewicz, Janusz Iwański, Krzysztof Knittel, Ryszard Krynicki, Robert Makłowicz, Pablopavo and Stanisław Sojka.

In November 2013, the first edition of an international version of The Talking Dog magazine was held. Created by David McGirr, led by McGirr and Kevin Patrick Cullen, it was an event separated from the original Gadający Pies. As it was led in English, its purpose was to integrate different Kraków communities and people living in Kraków that didn't speak Polish.

== Gallery ==
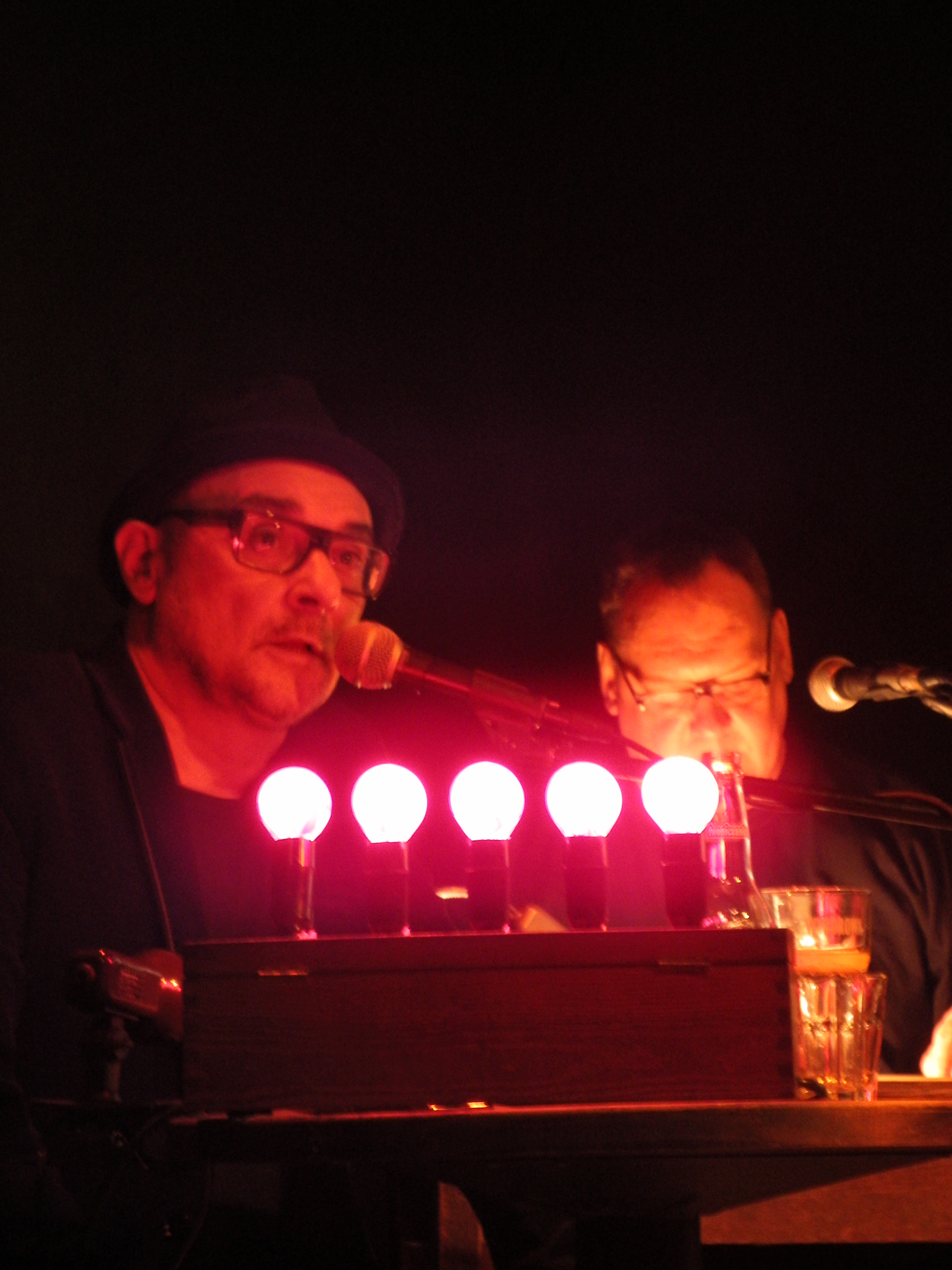
Maciej Piotr Prus (L) and Piotr Bikont (R).

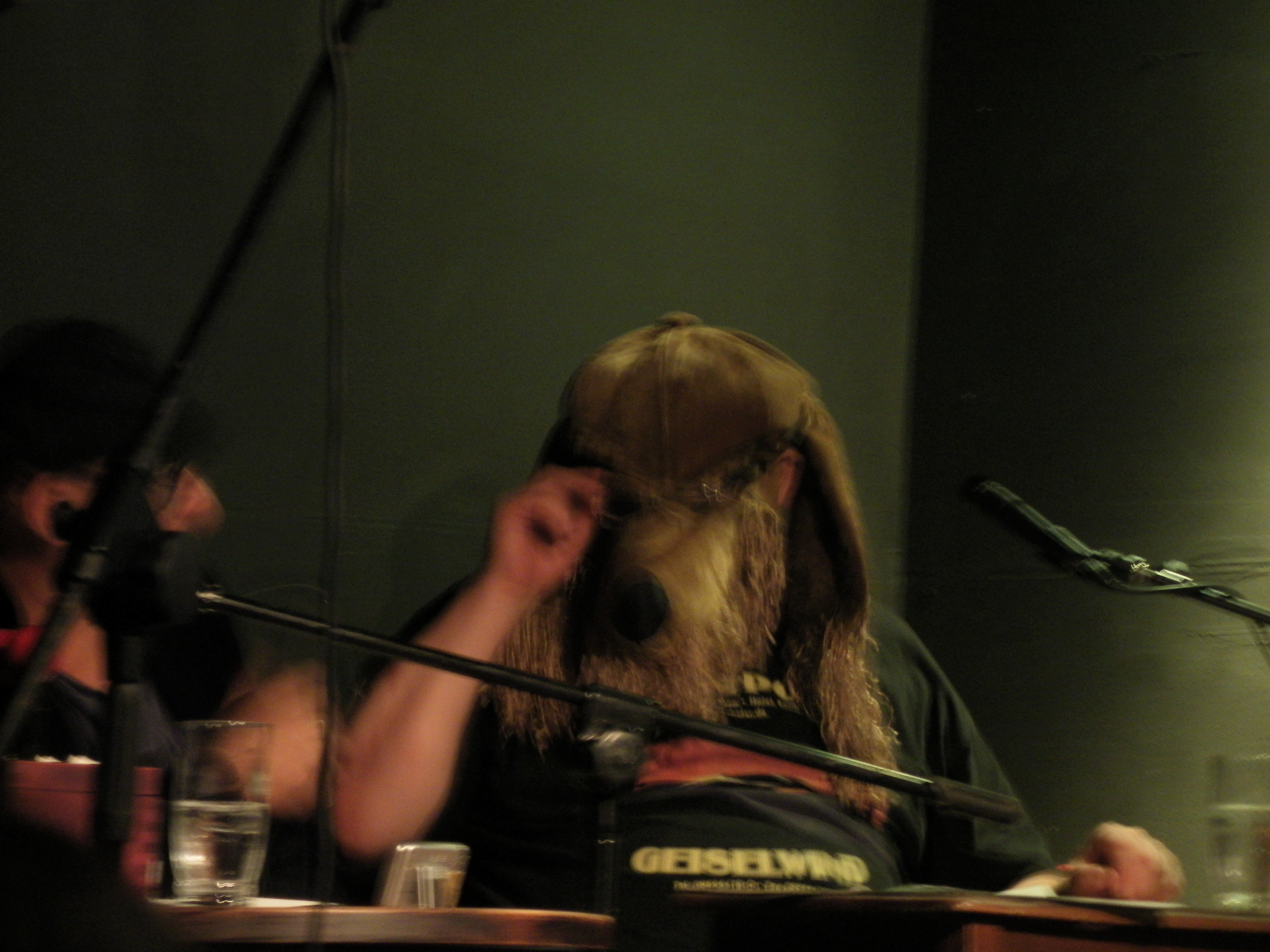
Bikont as the "Talking Dog".

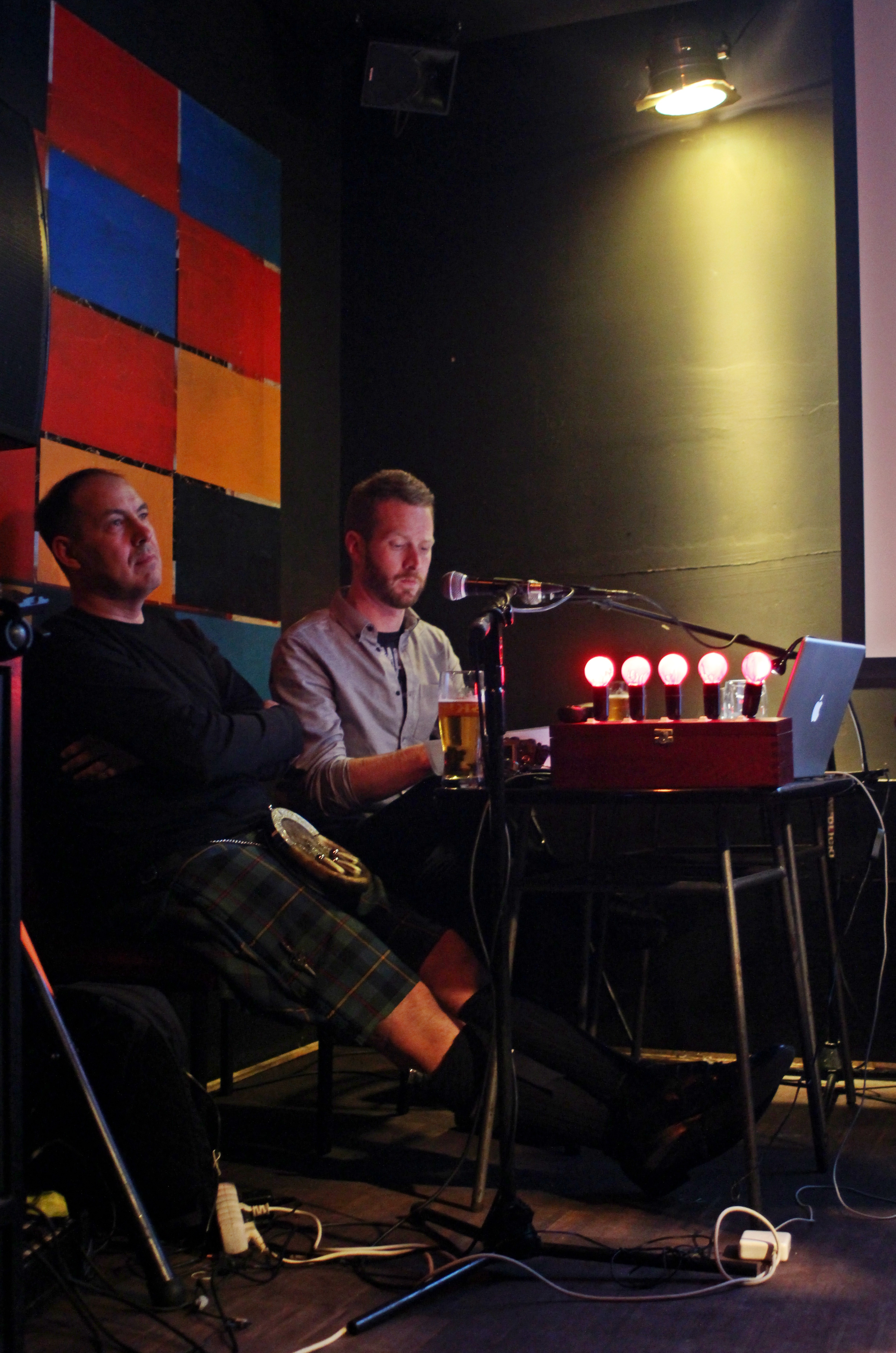
"The Talking Dog" led by David McGirr and Kevin Patrick Cullen.
