= Trafika =

International literary magazine

- Founding Editors: Dorsey Dunn, Michael Lee, Scott Rogers, Alfredo Sanchez, Jeffrey Young
- Categories: Literature, Fiction, Poetry, Conversations
- Frequency: Quarterly (1993–1994), irregularly (1995–1999)
- First issue: Autumn 1993
- Final issue: Autumn 1999
- Company: Trafika Press, Inc.
- Country: Czech Republic & United States
- Based in: Prague & New York
- Language: English
- Website: www.trafika.com
- ISSN: 1210-6488

Trafika was an international literary magazine edited in Prague, Czech Republic and New York City between 1993 and 1999, which now continues as an online literary site under the name Trafika Europe. Trafika was a printed journal that published the poetry and prose of emerging and established authors, with an emphasis on introducing the work of writers who were unknown or little known to English-language readers. In seven issues, Trafika published the work of over 120 authors writing in more than 30 languages. In addition to original literary texts and translations (into English), Trafika featured conversations with writers, including Miroslav Holub, Arnošt Lustig, György Konrád, Paul Bowles, and Tomaž Šalamun.

== History ==
Trafika was founded in Prague 1993 by Michael Lee, Alfredo Sanchez, Scott Rogers and Jeffrey Young. In 1994 Dorsey Dunn joined as editor in New York. Trafika was first published by Modra Musa Publishers in Prague and then, from 1994, by Trafika Press, Inc., a non-profit organization registered in New York. Trafika began as a quarterly but from 1995 publication became irregular. The last issue, Trafika 7, was published in 1999, and the magazine is defunct from that time.

During the 1990s the Trafika Board of Advisors included Morgan Entrekin (Grove/Atlantic); Tracy Cabanis (Alfred A. Knopf); George Dillehay (Publication Management); Jonathan Fanton (The MacArthur Foundation); Daniel Halpern (Ecco Press); Stephen Heintz (EastWest Institute); Peter Kaufman (TV Books); Jeri Laber (Human Rights Watch); Lewis Lapham (Harper’s Magazine); Maristella Lorch (The Italian Academy, New York); Wendy Luers (Foundation for a Civil Society); Marley Rusoff (Bantam, Doubleday & Dell); William Schwalbe (William Morrow & Co.); Elisabeth Sifton (Farrar, Straus & Giroux); Rebecca Sinkler (the New York Times), and Lise Stone.

Trafika received two annual grants from the National Endowment for the Arts. Other supporters included the Calouste-Gulbenkian Foundation, the Council for Literary Magazines and Presses, The Nation Institute, the Central and East European Book Publishing Project, the Open Society Fund-Prague, and the Czech Ministry of Culture.

== Contributors ==
Selected contributors: (Trafika 1, autumn 1993): Bo Carpelan, Luis Cabalquinto, Don DeLillo, Miroslav Holub, Arnošt Lustig, Josef Škvorecký, Lukáš Tomin; (Trafika 2, spring 1994): Yu Hua, Milan Milišić, Joyce Carol Oates, Drago Jančar, Jáchym Topol, Czesław Miłosz, Gilbert Sorrentino, György Konrád; (Trafika 3, summer 1994): Aleš Debeljak, Do Phuoc Tien, Norma Cole, Yves Simon, Ludvík Vaculík, Shuntarō Tanikawa, Feride Çiçekoğlu, Yuriy Tarnawsky, Yang Lian, Jim Krusoe; (Trafika 4, winter 1994): Lars Jakobson, Denis Johnson, Mia Couto, José Eduardo Agualusa, Paul Bowles, Kristien Hemmerechts, Roberto Tejada, John Barth; (Trafika 5, autumn 1995): Zafer Şenocak, Javier Marías, Tomaž Šalamun, Stephan Eibel, Aamer Hussein, Joost Zwagerman, Pierre Martory, Tor Ulven; (Trafika 6, autumn 1997): Slobodan Selenić, Ignacio Martínez de Pisón, Khaled Mattawa, Nina Bouraoui, Martin M. Šimečka, Dana Ranga, Yusef Komunyakaa, Steve Sem-Sandberg, Hatif Janabi; (Trafika 7, autumn 1999): Natasza Goerke, Herberto Hélder, Marcin Świetlicki, Eleni Sikelianos, Mohammad Choukri, Uche Nduka, Amir Or, Miłosz Biedrzycki, Péter Nádas.
