= Aleksander Janicki =

Polish visual artist and performer (born 1963)

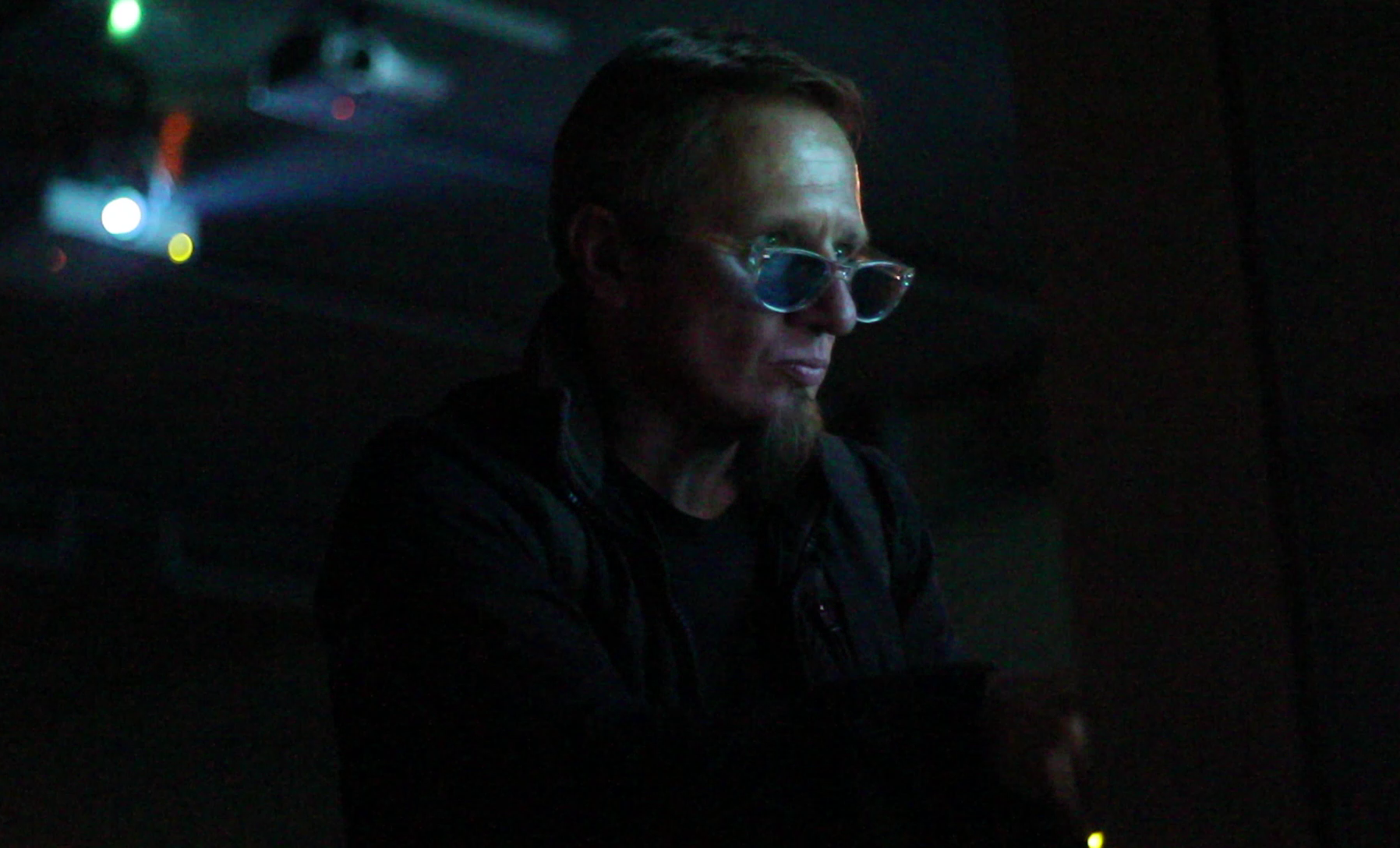
- Born: 26 February 1963; Kraków
- Education: Jan Matejko Academy of Fine Arts
- Known for: graphic arts photography stage design multimedia concepts performance
- Website: Home page

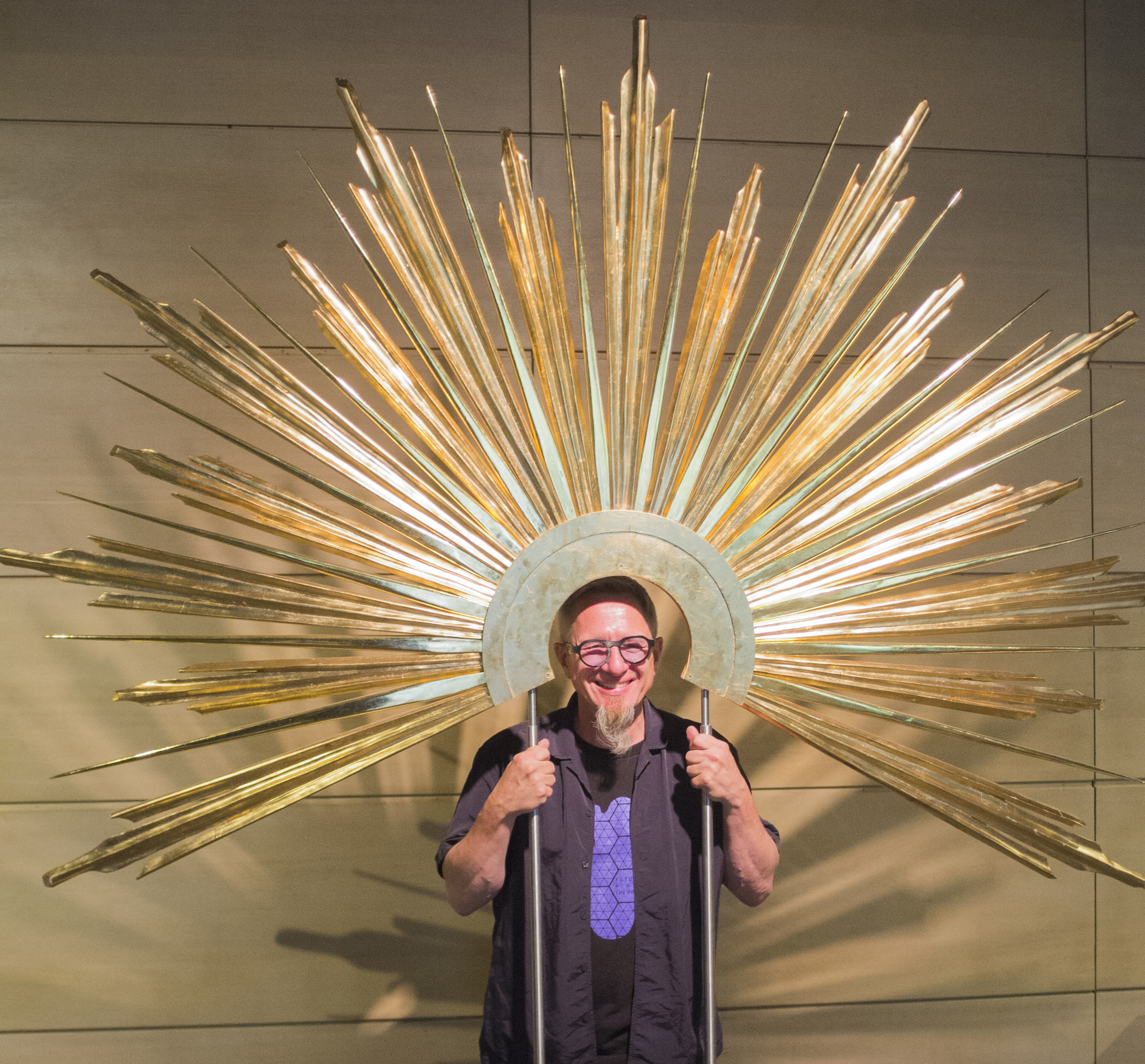
Aleksander Janicki (2022)

Aleksander Janicki (born 26 February 1963) is a Polish graphic artist, photographer, stage designer, multimedia concept designer and performer.

== Life and work ==
Since 1984 he studied at the Jan Matejko Academy of Fine Arts, from which he graduated in 1990.

He has created numerous multimedia installations in the public space. He was the author of artistic actions and paratheatrical activities, among others Visitor in the Re-Productions series, presented independently in Münster, Kassel, Venice and at the Art Forum in Berlin, Kraków, Warsaw, Frankfurt, St. Petersburg and Nuremberg. He co-created the winning project for the Polish Pavilion at Expo 2005 in Japan (together with Krzysztof Ingarden and in collaboration with Ingarden & Ewy Architects). He also made animations, intros and other short forms for television, including Canal+, TVP and Polsat (among others the intro to the program of Robert Makłowicz).

He was one of the creators and members of the editorial board of the spoken magazine Gadający Pies (The Talking Dog, 2010–2015). He invited Jerzy Vetulani to perform in the magazine.

He founded HiQ ensemble that creates audiovisual performances, combining improvised music and video art. The formation performed, among other locations, at the International Festival Audio Art (2011), as well as in the Museum of Contemporary Art in Kraków and Manggha.

As a stage designer he co-worked mostly with directors Piotr Bikont and Piotr Urbaniak, working on their shows at Silesian Theatre, Bagatela Theatre, Nowy Theater in Łódź, KTO Theatre in Kraków and Wanda Siemaszkowa Theatre in Rzeszów.

Janicki sporadically also worked as an actor. In 2004 he starred in Karol: A Man Who Became Pope as German officer Bueller, and in 2013 in the short mockumentary Hydrophobia.

In 1983 he married Katarzyna Niewodniczanska, daughter of Jerzy Niewodniczański. They have two children: Mateusz Janicki and Marianna.

== Awards ==
- 2001: Ibizografia, Hiszpania
- 2005: Award of the Association of Polish Architects, Branch in Kraków for the best design of the year
- 2006: Nationwide Award of the Association of Polish Architects, First degree
- 2006: Award of the Minister of Infrastructure of Poland, First degree
- 2007: Contractworld Award, Hanower
- 2008: 1st prize for interactive sculpture KPT, Kraków
- 2011: Best Practice Special Award for Interactive Digital Signage in the Open Space Art & Architecture
- 2011: 1st prize for the multimedia sculpture The Tree of Investment and Innovation at the Economic Forum in Krynica and the promotion of the Małopolska Region in the European Parliament in Brussels
- 2011: 1st prize for the design of the Małopolska Economic Award statuette given annually since 2011 by the Marshal of the Malopolska Region
- 2012: 1st prize for the series of multimedia sculptures for the National Science Center
- 2012: 1st prize for the design and execution of sculptures-statues for the European Digital Dragons Games Festival
- 2012: 1st prize for a multimedia statuette for the SARP and IAKS Poland contest
- 2013: 1st prize in the competition for the multimedia space of the chamber Aleksandrowice II, Muzeum Żup Krakowskich Wieliczka
- 2013: 1st prize for the design of multimedia exposure for Wieliczka Salt Mine, Touristic Route
- 2014: First prize in Multimedia Design Competition – MultiLab – MPTI for KPT
