= Iwański =

Iwanski (feminine Iwańska) is a Polish surname. Notable people include:

- Alicja Iwańska (1918–1996), Polish resistance fighter and academic
- Henryk Iwanski (1902–1978), Polish resistance fighter
- Janusz Iwanski (born 1956), Polish jazz guitarist
- Maciej Iwanski (born 1981), Polish footballer
- Michał Iwanski (born 1994), Polish painter
- Tomasz Iwanski (born 1968), Polish tennis player
