= Goerke =

Goerke is a surname. Notable people with the surname include:

- Christine Goerke (born 1969), American dramatic soprano
- Donald Goerke (1926–2010), American business executive and food developer
- Natasza Goerke (born 1962), Polish writer
