= Stanisław Sojka =

Polish singer (1959–2025)

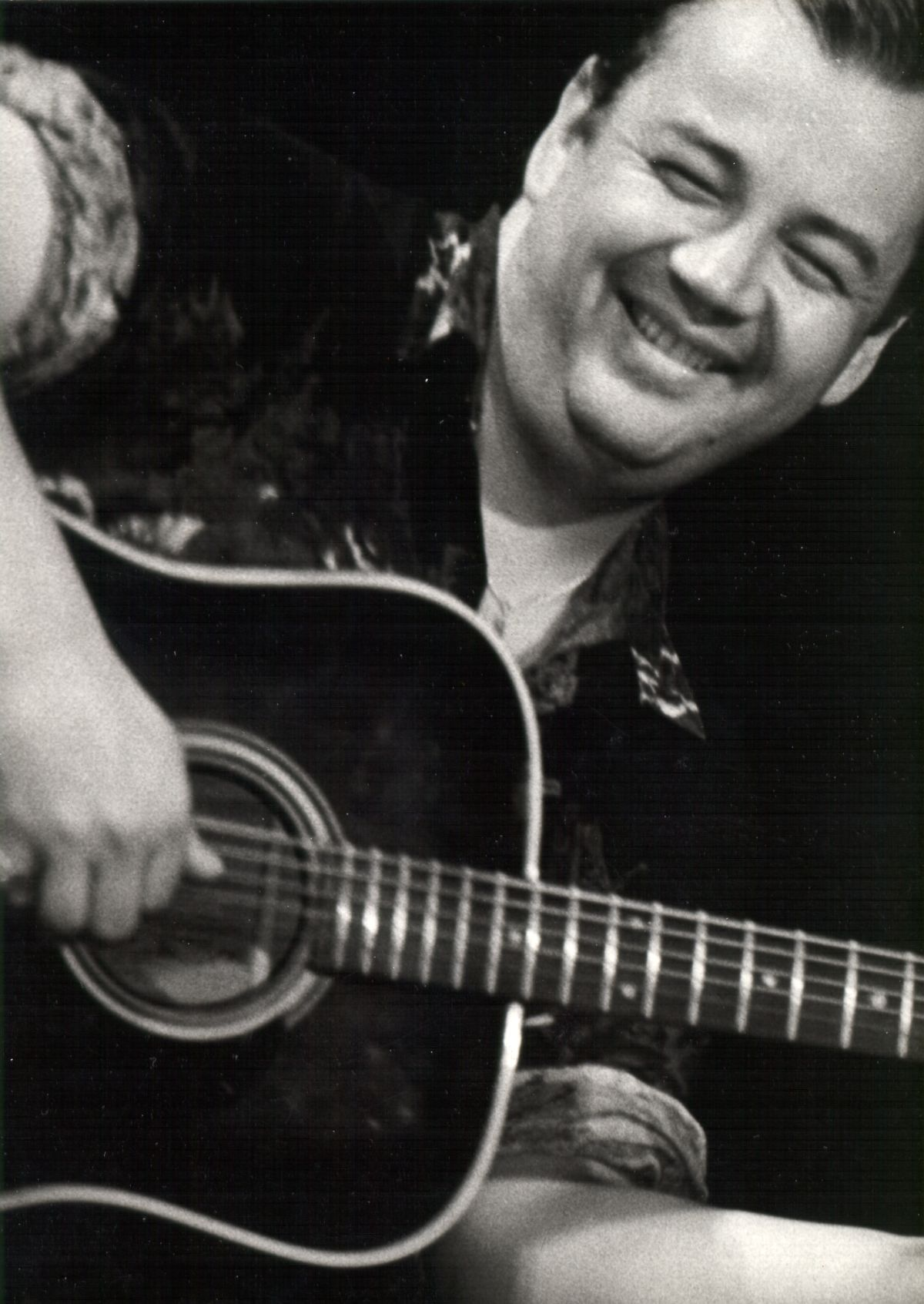
- Sojka in the 1980s
- Born: 26 April 1959; Żory, Poland
- Died: 21 August 2025 (aged 66); Sopot, Poland
- Occupations: Musician, singer
- Musical career
- Also known as: Stanisław Soyka
- Genres: Jazz, pop
- Instrument: Piano
- Labels: PolJazz, RCA, Zic Zac, ESA, QM Music, Polskie Nagrania Muza, Helicon, Pomaton EMI, EMI Music Poland, Universal Music Poland
- Website: www.soyka.pl

Stanisław Joachim Sojka (26 April 1959 – 21 August 2025), also known as Stanisław Soyka, was a Polish jazz and pop singer, pianist and composer.

== Beginnings and breakthrough ==
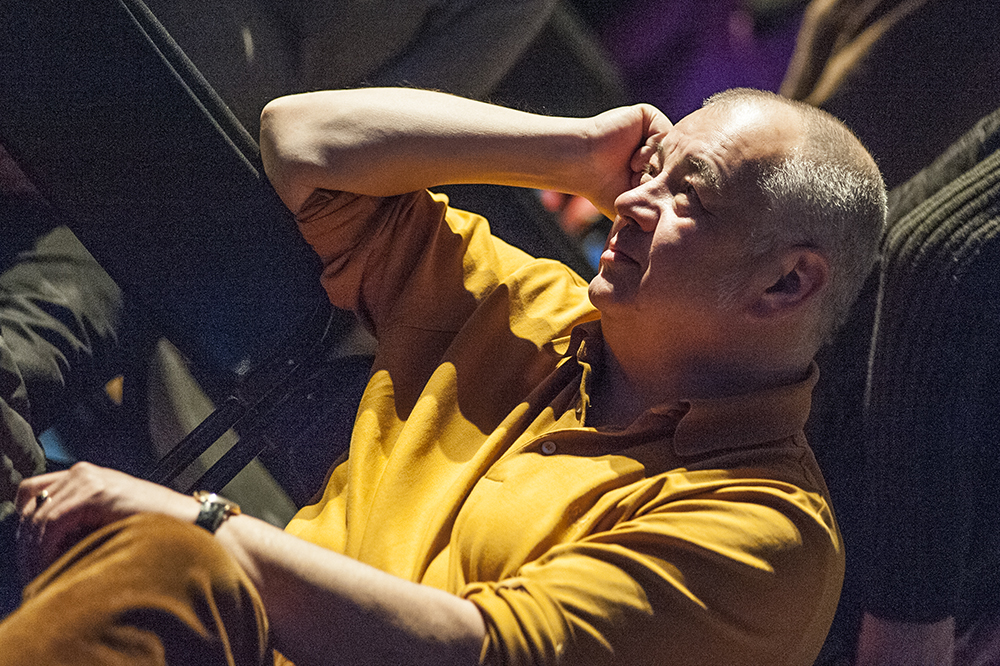
Sojka in the audience at the Warsaw Cross Culture Festival in September 2012

Sojka began performing as a boy soprano in Gliwice Cathedral Choir, when he was seven years old. At the same time he was also a second-grade violin student at the State Musical School in Gliwice. His musical education was continued at the Music High School in Katowice and completed with a master's degree in arrangement and composing from the Akademia Muzyczna im. K. Szymanowskiego w Katowicach.

Soyka made his professional debut on stage in November 1978, when he performed at the National Philharmonic Hall in Warsaw in the "Jazz at the Philharmonic" series. He presented a recital, inspired by classic jazz, soul and R&B, including songs by Ray Charles, Stevie Wonder, The Beatles and George Gershwin, but also traditional Polish Christmas carols and folklore tunes. The concert was recorded and released in 1979 as Soyka's debut album entitled Don't You Cry. In that year Stanisław Soyka won the top prize at Lubelskie Spotkania Jazzowe (Lublin Jazz Conference).

Over the next six years, he released three more jazz albums and one of religious music. He was named the best Polish jazz vocalist by readers of the magazine Jazz Forum, from 1983 to 1988. In the same period Soyka also recorded some pop songs for Polish Radio, which were later collected on the album Radioaktywny, released in 1989.

== Pop career ==
In 1986, Soyka signed a two-year record deal with RCA in Germany. There he recorded his first pop and first international album, entitled simply Stanisław Sojka. Among the producers was Harold Faltermeyer. Before the album he also produced Soyka's single "Spirit of the West", recorded for an ad campaign for West cigarettes. The album was a commercial flop, but it was a success in his native Poland. In 1988, Soyka returned to Poland and formed a duet with guitarist Janusz Iwański "Janina" from the Polish jazz group Tie Break. They recorded and performed together until 1994.

In 1991, Soyka recorded his most famous and best-selling album, Acoustic, co-produced by Dieter Meier from Yello. It brought hits like Cud niepamięci and Play It Again. In 1992 he was named the Best Polish Star of 1991 by the readers of "Popcorn" magazine for teenagers. His next album Neopositive from 1992 repeated the commercial success of Acoustic, thanks to the huge hit Tolerancja, which became the biggest of his career. In that year he also won the Bursztynowy Słowik – Grand Prix of Sopot International Song Festival. Another album, Radical Graża from 1994, was less successful, as were all his subsequent albums.

== New directions ==
In 1995, Soyka decided to compose music for poetry and chose William Shakespeare's sonnets, translated into Polish. The album Sonety Shakespeare was released in 1995 and his English version Soyka Sings Shakespeare's Sonnets four years later. Soyka gave the Polish version as a gift to Queen Elizabeth II, during her 1996 visit to Poland. In 2003, he composed music for the poem "Roman Triptych" written by Pope John Paul II and recorded the album Tryptyk rzymski. He presented these songs live in front of the Pope in the Vatican.

In 2001, Soyka recorded the last religious album of his career, Polskie pieśni wielkopostne with forgotten Polish Lenten songs. But Soyka did not neglect pop music and between those albums released Nr 17 in 1998, Soykanova in 2002 and album with covers Soyka Sings Love Songs in 2004. In 2007, he formed his new band Soyka Sextet Plus. In 2008 Soyka recorded as a guest artist two songs with rapper Gorzki, including one with Bizarre from D12 and one reggae song with composer and producer Krakowski. Soyka's first studio album in five years, Studio Wąchock, was released in October 2009.

Soyka won two Fryderyk Awards: as "Best Male Vocalist" of 1994 (on the first ceremony) and for the "Best Poetic Music Album" of 2003.

== Death ==
Sojka died on 21 August 2025, at the age of 66.

He was found in his hotel room after failing to appear at the Sopot Festival

== State decoration ==
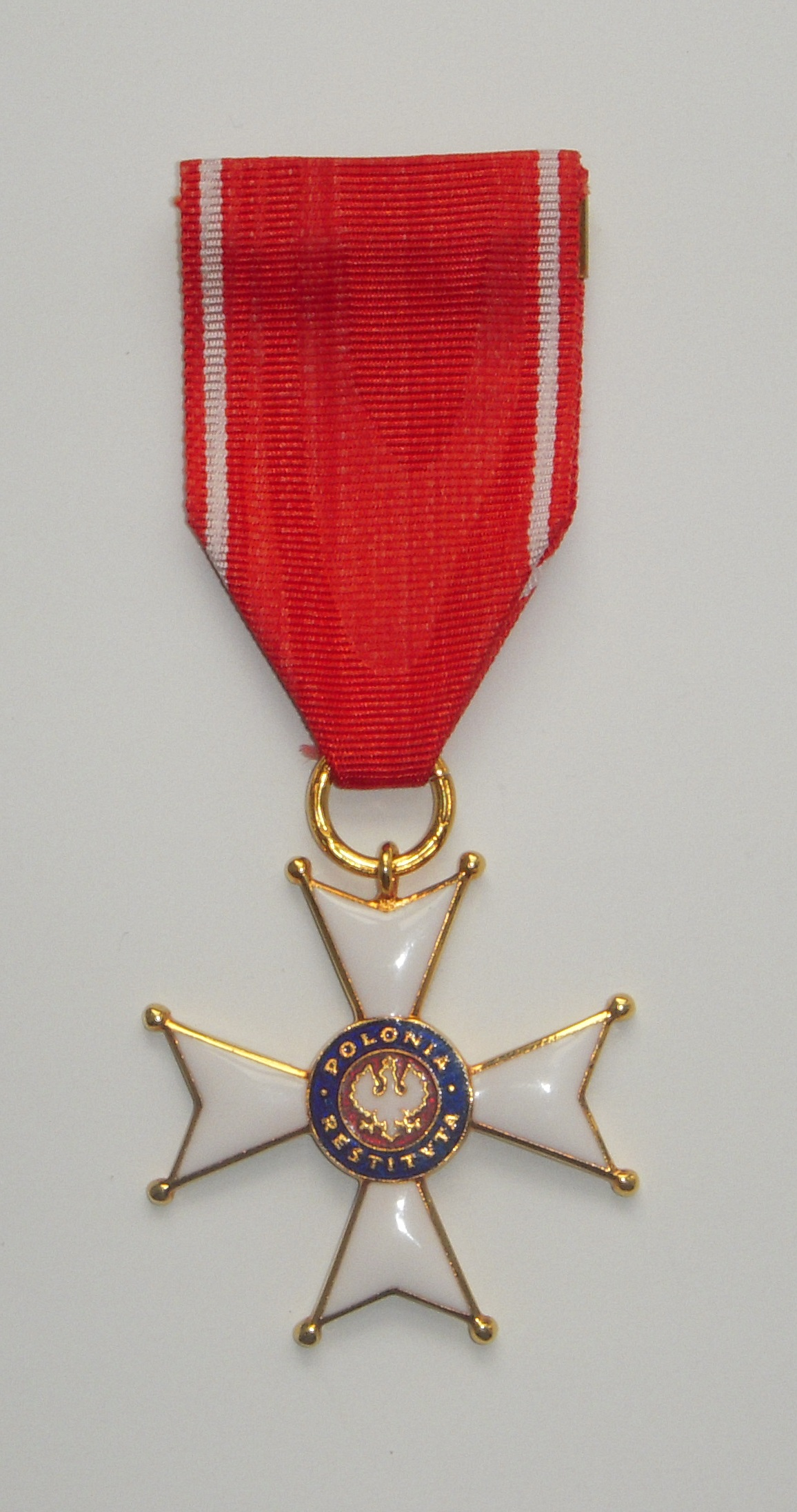
Krzyż kawalerski

- Krzyż Kawalerski Orderu Odrodzenia Polski, 2009 by Lech Kaczyński (Knight's Cross of the Order of Polonia Restituta)

== Discography ==
=== Studio albums ===
Title	Album details	Peak chart positions	Sales	Certifications
Title	Album details	POL	Sales	Certifications
Don't You Cry	Released: 16 April 1979; Label: PolJazz; Formats: Vinyl, CD, digital download	—		
Blublula	Released: 18 May 1981; Label: Polskie Nagrania Muza; Formats: Vinyl, CD	—		
Soyka Sings Ellington	Released: 19 April 1982; Label: Helicon; Formats: CD	—		
Matko, która nas znasz...	Released: 27 September 1982; Label: Helicon; Formats: CD	—		
Soyka w Piwnicy na Wójtowskiej	Released: 1984; Label: PolJazz; Formats: CD, digital download	—		
Stanisław Sojka	Released: 18 August 1986; Label: RCA; Formats: CD	—		
Radioaktywny	Released: 16 May 1988; Label: Polskie Nagrania Muza; Formats: CD, digital download	—		
Acoustic	Released: 19 April 1991; Label: Zic Zac; Formats: CD	—		
Sonety Shakespeare	Released: 9 October 1995; Label: Pomaton EMI; Formats: CD	—		
Nr 17	Released: 30 March 1998; Label: Pomaton EMI; Formats: CD	—		
Soyka Sings Shakespeare's Sonnets	Released: 23 November 1998; Label: Pomaton EMI; Formats: CD	—		
Soykanova	Released: 14 October 2002; Label: Pomaton EMI; Formats: CD, digital download	50		
Soyka Sings Love Songs	Released: 8 March 2004; Label: Pomaton EMI; Formats: CD, digital download	16		
...Tylko brać	Released: 10 September 2010; Label: Universal Music Poland; Formats: CD, digital download	7	POL: 15,000+	POL: Gold
Stanisław Soyka śpiewa 7 wierszy Czesława Miłosza	Released: 13 May 2011; Label: Universal Music Poland; Formats: CD, digital download	17		
Stanisław Soyka w hołdzie Mistrzowi	Released: 24 April 2012; Label: Universal Music Poland; Formats: CD, digital download	7		
"—" denotes a recording that did not chart or was not released in that territory.

=== Compilation albums ===
Title	Album details	Peak chart positions	Sales	Certifications
Title	Album details	POL	Sales	Certifications
Złota Kolekcja – Cud niepamięci	Released: 15 June 1998; Label: Pomaton EMI; Formats: CD	43	POL: 50,000+	POL: Gold
Złota Kolekcja, Vol. 2 – Życie to krótki sen	Released: 21 April 2004; Label: Pomaton EMI; Formats: CD	44		
Rocznik 59	Released: 28 November 2008; Label: EMI Music Poland; Formats: CD (Box set)	—		
Poeci polskiej piosenki – Soyka: Absolutnie nic...	Released: 30 April 2013; Label: Universal Music Poland; Formats: CD	—		
"—" denotes a recording that did not chart or was not released in that territory.

=== Collaborative albums ===
Title	Album details	Peak chart positions
Title	Album details	POL
Neopositive (with Janusz "Janina" Iwański)	Released: 1992; Label: ESA; Formats: CD, digital download	—
Radical Graża (with Janusz "Janina" Iwański i Kompania)	Released: 1994; Label: ESA; Formats: CD	—
Studio Wąchock (with Sekstet Plus)	Released: 2 October 2009; Label: Universal Music Poland; Formats: CD	23
W blasku światła (with Andrzej Piaseczny)	Released: 18 April 2011; Label: QM Music; Formats: CD, digital download	—
Strug. Leśmian. Soyka. (with Adam Strug)	Released: 13 May 2014; Label: Universal Music Poland; Formats: CD, digital download	22
"—" denotes a recording that did not chart or was not released in that territory.

=== Holiday albums ===
Title	Album details	Peak chart positions	Sales	Certifications
Title	Album details	POL	Sales	Certifications
Kolędy	Released: 1991; Label: Polskie Radio Katowice; Formats: CD	—		
Kolędy polskie	Released: 1995; Label: ESA; Formats: CD, digital download	—		
Polskie Pieśni Wielkopostne	Released: 31 March 2001; Label: Pomaton EMI; Formats: CD	26		
Tryptyk Rzymski	Released: 15 September 2003; Label: Pomaton EMI; Formats: CD	1	POL: 35,000+	POL: Gold
"—" denotes a recording that did not chart or was not released in that territory.
