= Brulion =

- Editor-in-chief: Robert Tekieli
- Categories: Literary magazine
- Frequency: Quarterly
- Founder: Robert Tekieli
- Founded: 1986
- First issue: 1986
- Final issue: 1999
- Country: Poland
- Based in: Kraków
- Language: Polish

Brulion (meaning Rough Sketchbook in English) was a Polish language quarterly literary magazine published in Poland from 1986 to 1999.

== History and profile ==
Brulion was established by a group led by Robert Tekieli in Kraków in 1986. The magazine, published quarterly, ceased publication in 1999.

Its editor in chief was also Robert Tekieli. Originally a quarterly of the alternative and semi-legal Polish culture, it became known for respecting no taboos and producing scandals since its ninth issue, thus becoming the voice of the underground, anti-communist Poland.

The generation of Brulion writers was influenced mainly by American poets like Frank O'Hara (that is why they're often called o´harists), Allen Ginsberg or John Ashbery, translated by Pietr Sommer. Another translator, Stanisław Barańczak, introduced to Poland the poetry of Philip Larkin, W. H. Auden, Robert Frost and others.

Brulion published, among others, an almanac named Przyszli barbarzyńci (transl. Future barbarians; the title comes from a poem by Cavafy). Therefore, the Brulion generation is also known as the barbarians.

== The best known brulion authors ==
- Marcin Baran
- Miłosz Biedrzycki
- Marzena Broda
- Paweł Filas
- Natasza Goerke
- Manuela Gretkowska
- Krzysztof Jaworski
- Krzysztof Koehler
- Cezary Michalski
- Jacek Podsiadło
- Marcin Sendecki
- Mirosław Spychalski
- Marcin Świetlicki
- Olga Tokarczuk
- Grzegorz Wróblewski
