= Tie Break =

Tie Break may refer to:

- A tiebreaker at the end of a set or game such as tennis
- Tie Break (video game), a 1990 tennis video game
- Tiebreak: Official Game of the ATP and WTA, a 2024 tennis video game
- Tie Break (Austrian band), an Austrian boyband
- Tie Break (jazz ensemble), a Polish jazz group
