= Bikont (disambiguation) =

A bikont is any of the eukaryotic organisms classified in the group Bikonta.

Bikont is also the surname of:

- Anna Bikont (born 1954), Polish psychologist and writer
- Piotr Bikont (1955–2017), Polish journalist, publicist, culinary critic and theatre director, Anna Bikont's husband
