= Jacek Podsiadło =

Polish poet (born 1964)

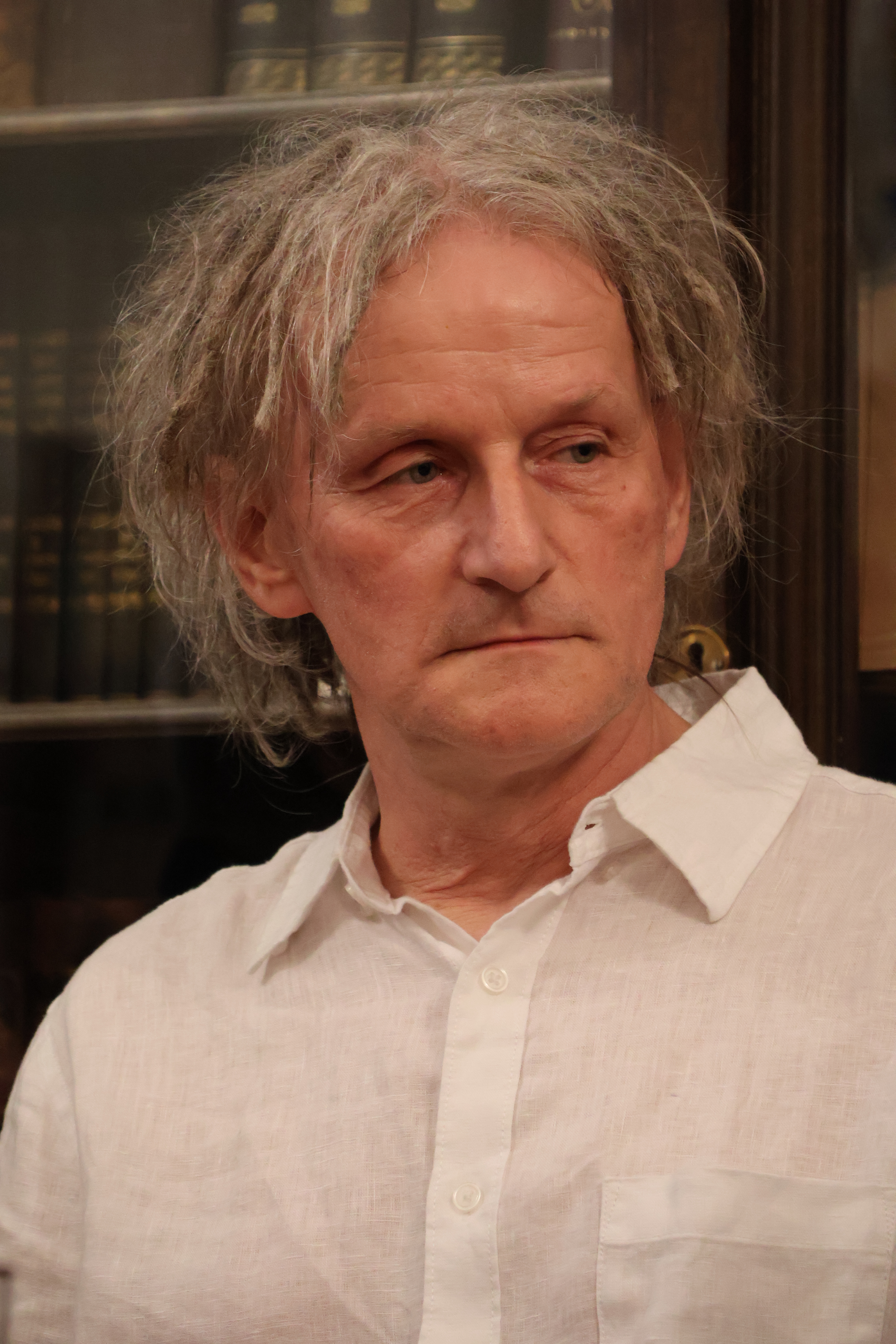
- Jacek Podsiadło, 2025
- Born: 1964 (age 61–62); Szewna
- Occupations: poet, writer, translator, essayist

Jacek Podsiadło (born 1964) is a Polish poet, writer, translator and essayist. Sometimes he uses a pen name Jac Po. He is one of the poets of the famous Polish bruLion generation. He had many professions, he now works in the Opole radio station.

== Work ==
He is the author of many volumes of poetry, he published poems and fragments of prose in most Polish literary magazines. His poems were translated, among others into English, German, Slovak, Slovenian and Ukrainian. He is also the author of the guide to Vilnius published by Pascal. In his work he opposes forms of social oppression (state, army, education), advocating anarchist and pacifist views.

In the years 1993–2008 he hosted the program 'Studnia' on Radio Opole. Since 2009, he has been running his own Home Radio on the Internet. In the years 2000–2007 he was a regular columnist for Tygodnik Powszechny. Originally he was influenced by Frank O'Hara, but later he developed his own original style.

== Books ==
- Nieszczęście doskonałe, Toruńskie Towarzystwo Kultury, Toruń 1987.
- W lunaparkach smutny, w lupanarach śmieszny, Staromiejski Dom Kultury, Warszawa 1990.
- Wiersze wybrane 1985-1990, Biblioteka "brulionu", Warszawa-Kraków 1992.
- Arytmia, Biblioteka "brulionu", Warszawa 1993.
- Dobra ziemia dla murarzy, Tikkun, Warszawa 1994.
- Języki ognia, Biblioteka "brulionu", Warszawa-Kraków 1994.
- To all the whales I'd love before, Kartki, Białystok 1996.
- Niczyje, boskie, Biblioteka "brulionu", Warszawa 1998.
- Wiersze wybrane 1990-1995, Stowarzyszenie "Inna Kultura", Bielsko-Biała 1998.
- Wiersze zebrane, Lampa i Iskra Boża, Warszawa 1998 (II wydanie: 2003).
- Wychwyt Grahama, Lampa i Iskra Boża, Warszawa 1999.
- Cisówka. Wiersze. Opowiadania, Biblioteka "Kartek", Białystok 1999.
- I ja pobiegłem w tę mgłę, Znak, Kraków 2001.
- Kra, Znak, Kraków 2005.
- A mój syn... (zbiór felietonów), Znak, Kraków 2006.
- Pippi, dziwne dziecko (zbiór felietonów), Hokus-Pokus, Warszawa 2006.
- Życie, a zwłaszcza śmierć Angeliki de Sancé, Znak, Kraków 2008.
- Trzy domy, Jacek Santorski & Co, Warszawa 2009.
- Czerwona kartka dla Sprężyny, Nasza Księgarnia, Warszawa 2009.
- Pod światło, Bez napiwku, Opole 2011.
- Przez sen, Ośrodek „Brama Grodzka – Teatr NN”, Lublin 2014.
- Przedszkolny sen Marianki, Biuro Literackie, Wrocław 2015.
- Włos Bregueta, Wojewódzka Biblioteka Publiczna i Centrum Animacji Kultury w Poznaniu, Poznań 2016.
- Konie, dziewczyna i pies. Pamiętnik, Nasza Księgarnia, Warszawa 2019.
- Litania i inne wiersze przeciw państwu (wybór wierszy), Wojewódzka Biblioteka Publiczna i Centrum Animacji Kultury w Poznaniu, Poznań 2019.
- Podwójne wahadło, Wojewódzka Biblioteka Publiczna i Centrum Animacji Kultury w Poznaniu, Poznań 2020.

== Awards and nominations ==
He won several Polish literary prizes, including Georg Trakl Prize, 1994; Kościelski Prize, 1998; Czesław Miłosz Prize 2000; he was also nominated for the Nike Award thrice.
