= Miłosz Biedrzycki =

Polish writer

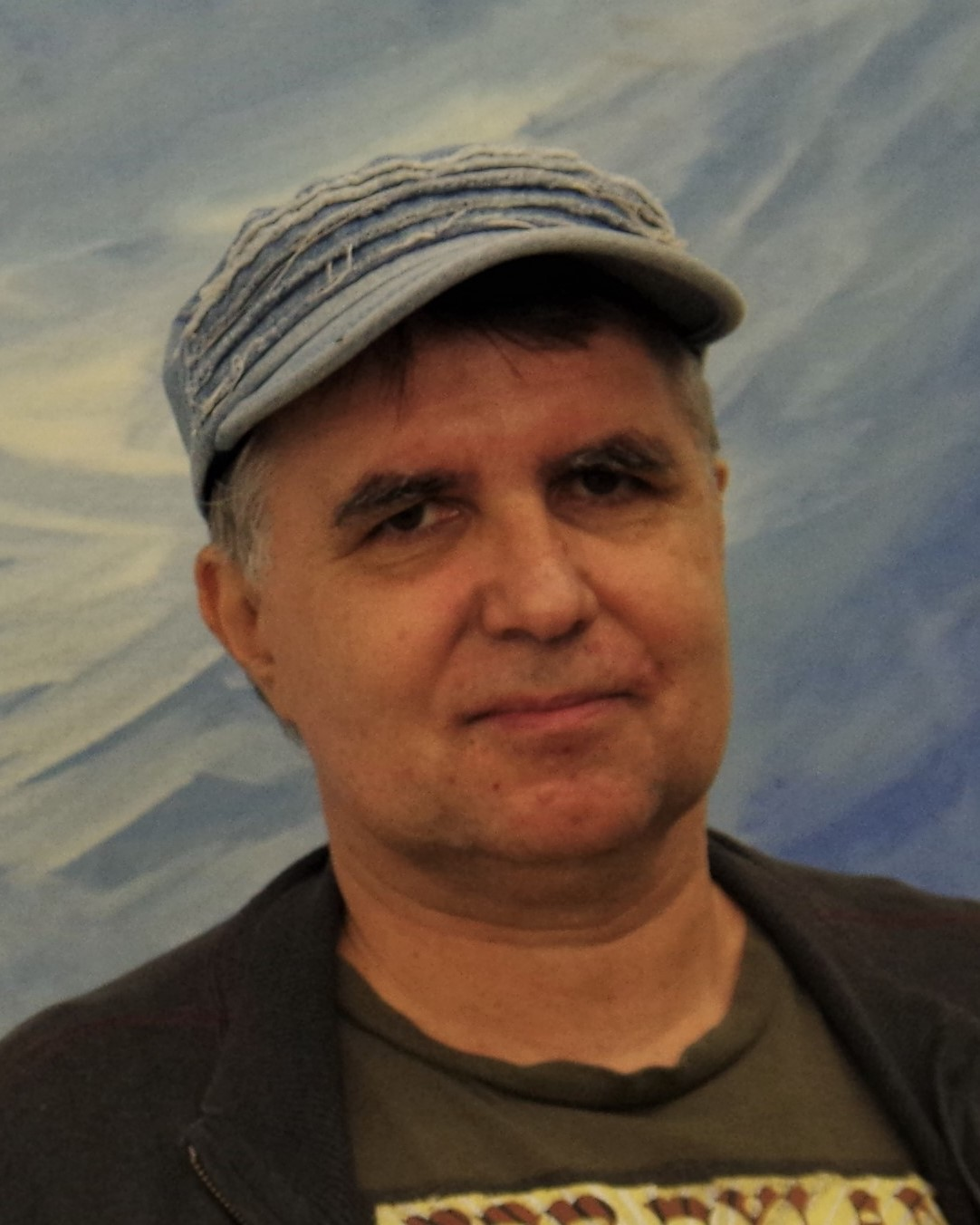
- Born: January 1, 1967 (age 59) Koper, Yugoslavia (now Slovenia)
- Occupation: Poet, translator, geophysical engineer
- Literary movement: Brulion generation
- Years active: 1990s–present
- Relatives: Mariusz Biedrzycki (brother)

Miłosz Biedrzycki, also referred to as MLB, (born 1967 in Koper, Yugoslavia) is a Polish poet, translator and geophysical engineer. One of the authors of the Brulion generation.

His poems appeared in various literary magazines, including Brulion, Trafika, Boston Review, Chicago Review, Fence and Washington Square Review. Biedrzycki is the author of nine books of poetry published in Poland, two published in Slovenia, and one each in the US and Ukraine. He translated poetry of Tomaž Šalamun (Jabłoń, Zielona Sowa 2004, ISBN 978-83-7389-630-7). He was a 2010 resident of the International Writing Program at the University of Iowa. From 2010 until 2015 he performed at the Gadający Pies live magazine. A brother of Mariusz Biedrzycki.

== Bibliography ==
=== Poetry ===
- *, (1993)
- OO, (1994)
- Pył/Łyp, (1997)
- No i tak, (2002), ISBN 978-83-86735-80-8
- Sonce na asfaltu/Słońce na asfalcie/Il sole sull'asfalto, (2003), ISBN 978-961-90833-6-9
- 69, (2006), ISBN 978-83-60511-03-9
- wygrzebane, (2007), ISBN 978-83-910030-7-7
- Sofostrofa i inne wiersze, (2007), ISBN 978-83-85568-88-9
- 69 (American version), (2010), ISBN 978-0-939010-99-8
- Życie równikowe, (2010), ISBN 978-83-60746-64-6
- 1122 do 33 (collaboration with Artur Płaczkiewicz), (2012), ISBN 978-1-105-75785-3
- Vrlina špargljev, (2013), ISBN 978-961-6699-33-4
- Porumb, (2013), ISBN 978-83-62717-93-4
- Пил/лип, (2022), ISBN 978-617-692-691-7
- Wiosna ludzi, (2022), ISBN 978-83-66571-75-4

=== Other works ===
- Biedrzycki, W. & Biedrzycki, M. (1991): Pit Water as a Source of Thermal Energy. – Proceedings, 4th International Mine Water Association Congress, 1: 13–23, 4 Abb., 1 Tab.; Ljubljana.
