= Maanam =

Polish rock band

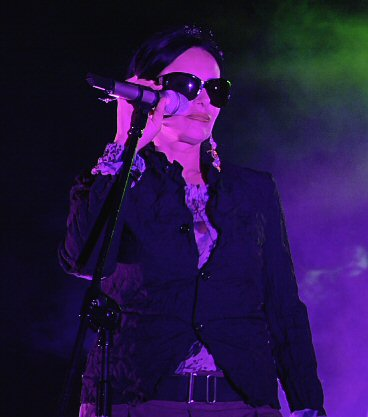
- Kora

Background information
- Origin: Poland
- Genres: Rock, new wave, Pop rock, Pop
- Years active: 1976–2007
- Past members: Kora Jackowska; Marek Jackowski; Milo Kurtis; John Porter; Ryszard Olesiński; Krzysztof Olesiński; Ryszard Kupidura; Paweł Markowski; Bogdan Kowalewski; Marcin Ciempiel; Krzysztof Dominik; Kostek Yoriadis; Janusz Iwański; Bogdan Wawrzynowicz; Jose Manuel Alban Juarez; Cezary Kaźmierczak

Maanam was a Polish rock band.

== History ==
Maanam was formed by Marek Jackowski and Milo Kurtis in 1975 as guitar band M-a-M. In 1976 the band was joined by guitar player John Porter and by Kora (Olga Jackowska) - Jackowski's wife. When Kurtis left, the band changed its name to Maanam Elektryczny Prysznic (Maanam Electric Shower). Originally an acoustic outfit, the band went electric in 1980, and since then has recorded some of Poland's best-selling singles and albums over the past 25 years.

During the first half of the 1980s, Maanam featured an energetic, guitar-driven post-punk sound. Kora's vocal gymnastics were typical of the iconoclastic international female pop vocalists of the time, and showcased the consonant-laden Polish language as one perfectly suited to rock sounds. In 1988, Maanam's "Sie ściemnia" became the first Polish music video to air on the international MTV. Maanam's sound in the 1980s could be considered a cross between Nina Hagen, Siouxsie and the Banshees, and Blondie.

In the 1990s, Maanam acquired a more melodic, but equally catchy, sound.

In 2007, Marek and Olga (Kora) announced the suspension of the band for an indefinite time. The two later performed with other musicians.

Guitarist Janusz Iwański played with the group for a time.

Their former lead singer, Olga Jackowska, died from cancer on 28 July 2018 at the age of 67. Bassist Krzysztof Olesiński died on 18 June 2023, at the age of 70.

== Discography ==
Title	Album details	Peak chart positions	Certifications
Title	Album details	POL	Certifications
Maanam	Released: 1981; Label: Wifon; Formats: LP, CD, CS, digital download	—	
O!	Released: 1982; Label: Pronit; Formats: LP, CD, CS, digital download	—	
Nocny patrol	Released: 19 November 1983; Label: Jako/Polton; Formats: LP, CD, CS, digital download	—	
Mental Cut	Released: 1984; Label: Jako/Polskie Nagrania; Formats: LP, CD, CS, digital download	—	
Sie ściemnia	Released: 1989; Label: Pronit; Formats: LP, CD, CS, digital download	—	
Derwisz i anioł	Released: 1991; Label: Kamiling Co./Arston; Formats: LP, CD, CS, digital download	—	
Róża	Released: 22 September 1994; Label: Kamiling Co./Pomaton; Formats: LP, CD, CS, digital download	—	POL: 3× Platinum
Łóżko	Released: 30 September 1996; Label: Pomaton EMI; Formats: LP, CD, CS, digital download	—	POL: 2× Platinum
Klucz	Released: 28 September 1998; Label: Pomaton EMI; Formats: CD, CS, digital download	—	
Hotel Nirwana	Released: 3 March 2001; Label: Pomaton EMI; Formats: CD, CS, digital download	3	
Znaki szczególne	Released: 27 March 2004; Label: Pomaton EMI; Formats: CD, CS, digital download	1	
Miłość Jest Cudowna (1975-2015)	Released: 16 October 2015; Label: Pomaton EMI		
"—" denotes a recording that did not chart or was not released in that territory.
