= Marcin Baran =

Polish writer

Marcin Baran (born 1963 in Kraków) is a Polish poet and journalist. He has a degree in Polonistics from the Jagiellonian University. He is one of the Polish poets who published their verses in the magazine bruLion (sometimes spelled brulion).

One of the main themes of his poetry is woman, for him the symbol of deathlessness. His poems have been translated into German, Slovak and Czech.

== Books of poetry ==
- Pomieszanie Kraków: Oficyna Literacka, 1990
- Sosnowiec jest jak kobieta Kraków-Warszawa: bruLion, 1992
- Zabiegi miłosne Kraków: Baran i Suszczyński, 1996 (nominated for Nike Award)
- Sprzeczne fragmenty Poznań: a5, 1996
- Tanero Kraków: Oficyna Literacka, 1998
- Prozak liryczny Kraków: WL, 1999
- Bóg raczy wiedzieć Kraków: Zebra, 2000
- Destylat Kraków: Wydawnictwo Zielona Sowa 2001 (selected poems)
- Gnijąca wisienka Kraków: a5, 2003

== Bibliography ==
- Polish bibliography
