= Hatif Janabi =

Iraqi poet

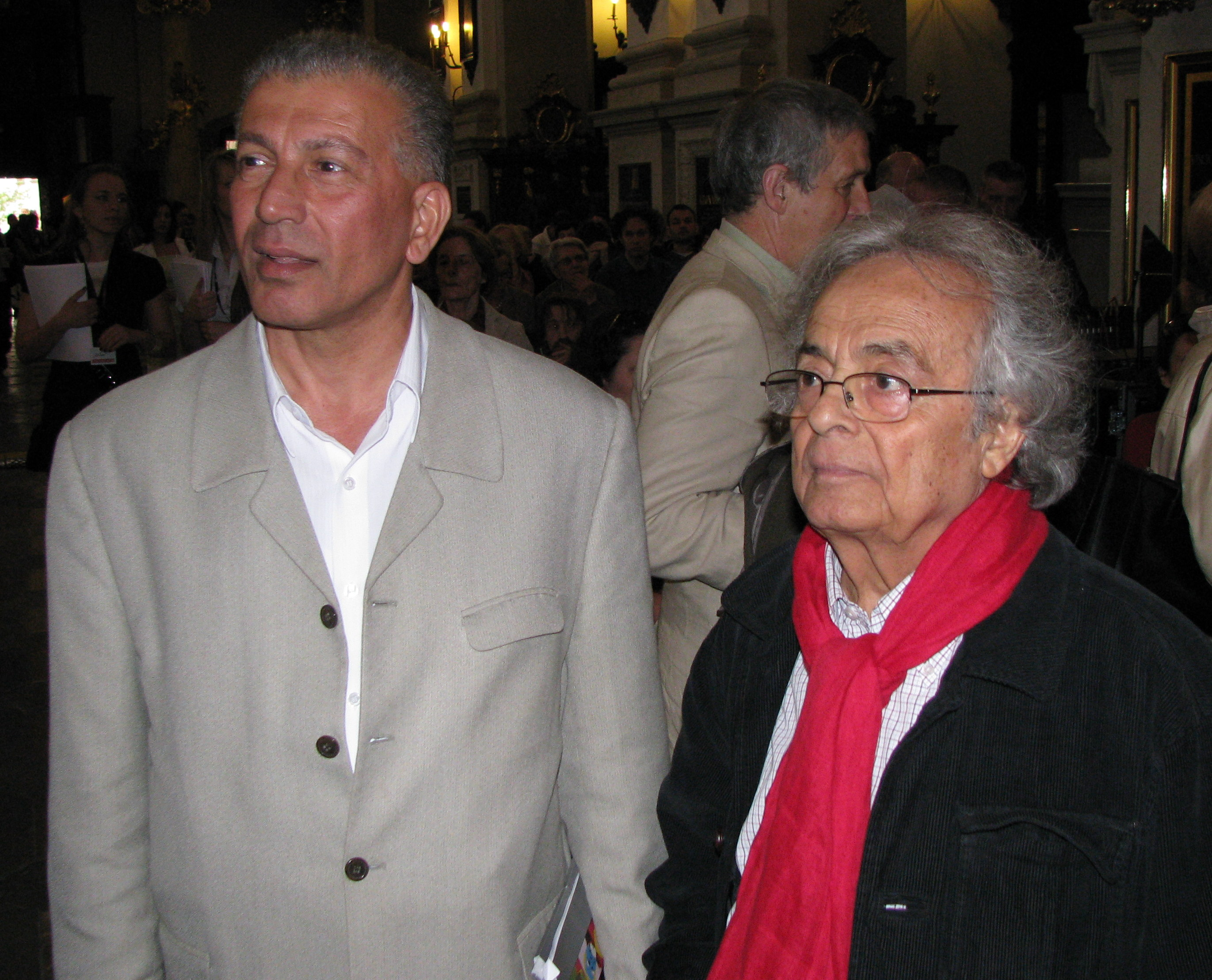
Hatif Janabi and Syrian poet Adunis - May 12, 2011

Hatif Janabi (born 1952) is an Iraqi poet, translator and author. Born near Babylon in 1952, he studied Arabic language and literature at Baghdad University. He moved to Warsaw, Poland in 1976 for higher studies, eventually obtaining a master's degree in Polish language and literature and a PhD in drama, both from Warsaw University. He has lived in Poland ever since and now teaches Arabic language and literature at Warsaw University. He has also taught at the University of Tizi Ouzou and Indiana University.

Janabi has published several collections of poetry, and his work has been translated into many languages including Polish, English, French, German, Spanish and Russian. A volume of his poems in English translation was published by the University of Arkansas Press in 1996 under the title Questions and their Retinue. The translator Khaled Mattawa won the Arkansas Arabic Translation Award for this work.

Janabi is also known as one of the principal translators of Polish literature into the Arabic language. He has translated some of the most important Polish writers, among them Adam Mickiewicz, Czesław Miłosz, Wisława Szymborska, Juliusz Słowacki, Zbigniew Herbert, Tadeusz Różewicz, Stanisław Grochowiak, Adam Zagajewski, Edward Stachura, Rafał Wojaczek, Ryszard Kapuściński and Leszek Kołakowski.
