= Khaled Mattawa =

Libyan poet and academic (born 1964)

- Born: 1964 (age 61–62); Benghazi, Libya
- Education: University of Tennessee at Chattanooga; Indiana University Bloomington; Duke University
- Occupations: Poet, translator, essayist
- Employer: University of Michigan
- Writing career
- Period: 1995–present
- Genre: Poetry
- Notable works: Ismalia Eclipse, The Zodiac of Echoes, Amorisco

Khaled Mattawa (Arabic: خالد مطاوع; born 1964) is a Libyan poet, and a renowned Arab-American writer, he is also a leading literary translator, focusing on translating Arabic poetry into English. He works as an Assistant professor of creative writing at the University of Michigan, Ann Arbor, Michigan, United States, where he currently lives and writes.

== Background ==
Khaled Mattawa was born in Benghazi, the second largest city in Libya, where he spent his childhood and early teens. In 1979, he emigrated to the United States. He lived in the south for many years, finishing high school in Louisiana at St. Paul's School and completing bachelor's degrees in political science and economics at the University of Tennessee at Chattanooga. He went on to earn an MA in English and an MFA in creative writing in 1994 from Indiana University Bloomington, where he taught creative writing. He was a professor of English and Creative Writing at California State University, Northridge. He received his PhD from Duke University in 2009.

His work has appeared in Poetry, The Kenyon Review, Blackbird, Crazyhorse, New England Review, Callaloo, Beloit Poetry Journal, Poetry East, Michigan Quarterly Review, The Iowa Review, Black Warrior Review and The Pushcart Prize XIX, The Best American Poetry 1997 anthologies.

Khaled Mattawa began writing poetry in the late 1980s. His first collection of poems was published 1995. He then started working on translating Arabic poetry of renowned Arab poets into English, his first translation Questions and Their Retinue: Selected Poems of Iraqi poet Hatif Janabi was published in 1996. He contributed and edited two Anthologies on Arab American Literature.

Mattawa is a contributing editor for Banipal magazine, the leading independent magazine of contemporary Arab literature translated into English. He was president of Radius of Arab American Writers organization RAWI.

In 2014, he was elected a Chancellor of the Academy of American Poets. In 2019, he was a contributor to A New Divan: A Lyrical Dialogue between East and West, edited by Bill Swainson.

== Awards and recognition ==
Mattawa received a MacArthur Foundation Fellowship in 2014, an Academy of American Poets award, the PEN Award for Poetry in Translation in 2003 and 2011, a 1997 Guggenheim Fellowship, the Alfred Hodder fellowship from Princeton University 1995–1996, an NEA translation grant, and two Pushcart prizes.

Mattawa has also won the Arkansas Arabic Translation Prize and the Banipal Prize. These are the two major awards for translation of Arabic literature into English. He won the former for his translation of Hatif Janabi's poetry and the latter for Selected Poems of Adunis. The only other person to have won both the Arkansas and the Banipal awards is Samah Selim.

== Bibliography ==
=== Poetry ===
- Tocqueville New Issues, 2010 ISBN 978-1-930974-90-6
- Amorisco Ausable Press, 2008, ISBN 978-1-931337-44-1
- Zodiac of Echoes. Ausable Press. 2003. ISBN 978-1-931337-16-8.
- Ismailia Eclipse The Sheep Meadow Press, 1995, ISBN 978-1-878818-44-7
- Contributor to The New Divan: A Lyrical Dialogue Between East and West ISBN 9781909942288

=== Translation from Arabic ===
- Adonis: Selected Poems (The Margellos World Republic of Letters), Yale 2010, ISBN 978-0-300-15306-4 (shortlisted for the 2011 Griffin Poetry Prize)
- Amjad Nasser, (2009). Shepherd of solitude: selected poems, 1979-2004, Banipal Books, ISBN 978-0-9549666-8-3
- Joumana Haddad, (2008). Invitation to a Secret Feast, Tupelo Press, ISBN 978-1-932195-62-0
- Iman Mirsal, (2008). These are not oranges, my love: selected poems, Sheep Meadow Press, ISBN 978-1-931357-54-8
- Maram Al-Massri, (2004). A Red Cherry on a White-Tiled Floor: Selected Poems by Bloodaxe Books, United Kingdom, 2004, ISBN 978-1-85224-640-2; Copper Canyon Press, United States, 2007
- Fadhil Al Azzawi (2004). Miracle Maker, Selected Poems. BOA Editions. ISBN 978-1-929918-45-4.
- Saadi Youssef, (2002). Without An Alphabet, Without A Face: Selected Poems Graywolf Press, ISBN 978-1-55597-371-1
- Fadhil Al Azzawi, (1997). In Every Well A Joseph Is Weeping, poems of Quarterly Review of Books
- Hatif Janabi (1996). Questions and Their Retinue: Selected Poems. University of Arkansas Press. ISBN 978-1-55728-432-7.

=== Anthologies of Arab American Literature ===
- Dinarzad's Children: An Anthology of Arab American Fiction, University of Arkansas Press, 2004 ISBN 978-1-55728-912-4
- Post Gibran: Anthology of New Arab American Writing, Kitab, 1999, ISBN 978-0-9652031-3-5

=== Essays ===
- How Long Have You Been With Us?: Essays on Poetry. (University of Michigan Press, 2016, ISBN 978-0-472-07329-0).

== See also ==
- English literature
- Libyan literature
- Arabic literature
- List of Arab American writers
