= Robert Makłowicz =

Polish journalist and historian

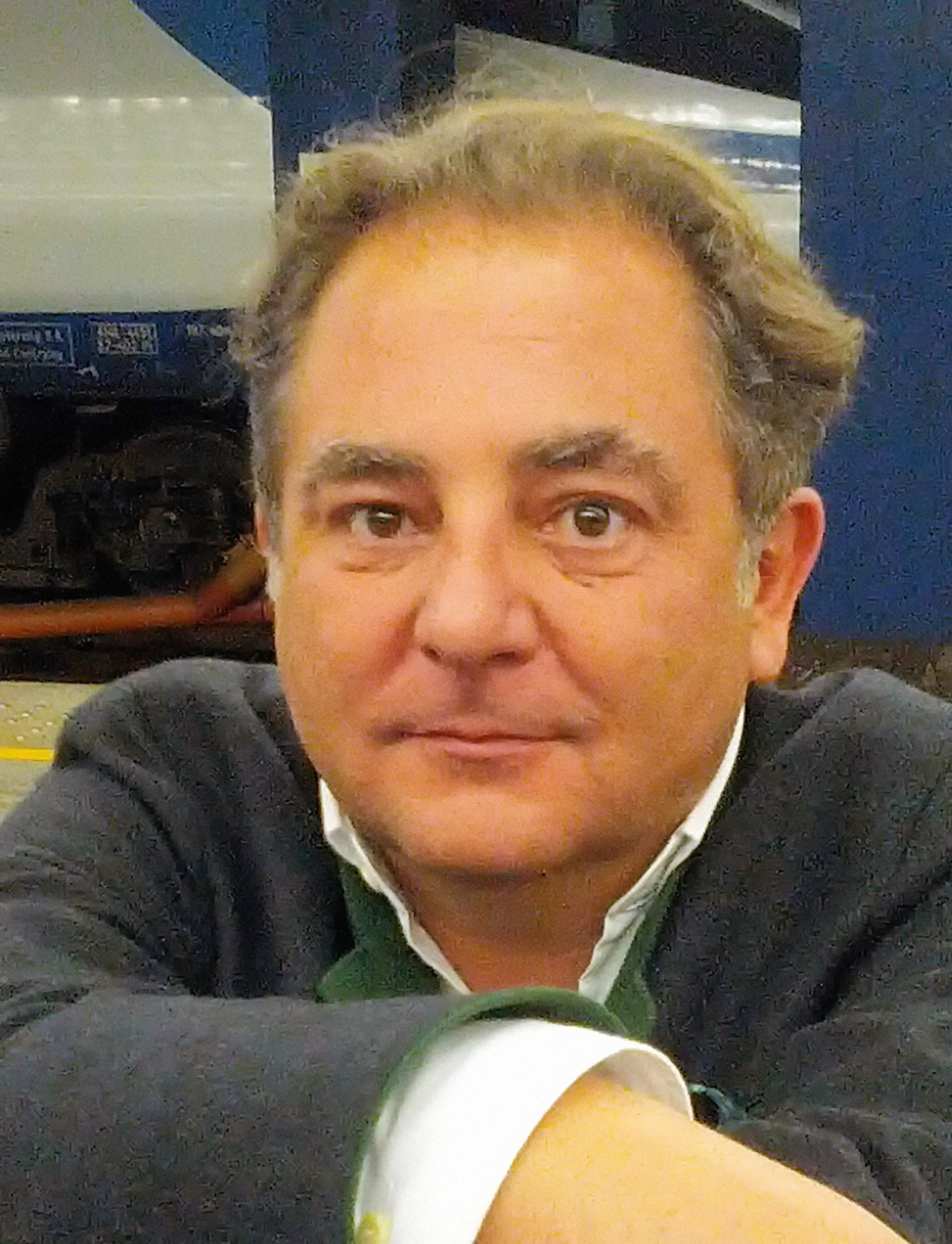
- Makłowicz in 2015
- Born: Robert Witold Makłowicz; August 12, 1963 (age 63); Kraków, Poland
- Education: Jagiellonian University
- Occupations: Journalist; historian; writer; food critic; television personality
- Years active: 1993–present
- Employer: Food Network
- Television: Makłowicz w podróży
- Children: 2
- Awards: Cross of Merit (Poland); Cross of Merit (Hungary); Decoration of Merit in Gold (Austria)
- Website: maklowicz.pl

Robert Witold Makłowicz (Polish pronunciation: [ˈrɔbɛrt maˈkwɔvit͡ʂ]; born 12 August 1963) is a Polish food critic, journalist, historian and television personality, notable as a promoter of the Polish cuisine and slow food. He is best known for his series of culinary TV programs Makłowicz w podróży (Makłowicz on the Road).

== Life and career ==
He was born in 1963 in Kraków to sailor father Włodzimierz and mother Beata (née Preiss). On his father's side, he is mainly of Ukrainian origin, except for his great-grandmother, who was Armenian with Ukrainian self-identification. Initially, the surname was Mokłowicz (Ukrainian: Моклович), including that of Robert's grandfather — Izydor, but upon Polonisation some members of the family changed it to Makłowicz. On his mother's side he also has Polish, Hungarian and Austrian ancestry.

He became fascinated with European cuisine during his studies at the Faculty of History of the Jagiellonian University. After the end of communism in Poland, in 1993, as a joke, he had shown one of his friends a recipe for wiener schnitzel he prepared himself. He was instantly offered the job of a culinary critic of the Kraków variation of the Gazeta Wyborcza daily. Soon afterwards his essays and descriptions of various restaurants in Kraków became so popular that he was moved to the all-national weekly magazine published by Gazeta Wyborcza. He also started cooperation with various other newspapers, including Przekrój, Wprost (2002–2005) and Newsweek Polska (since 2005).

In 1996 he was also offered a short programme in the morning block of the public TV. Although far from prime time, the programme gained much popularity and, since August 1998, Makłowicz has been preparing a weekly show named Robert Makłowicz's Culinary Travels. Each show is prepared in a different region of the world and presents the local cuisine as prepared by Makłowicz himself or by local people, not necessarily professional chefs. In 2016, he appeared on Bake-Off. Ale Ciacho! culinary show broadcast on TVP2 channel.

In 2017 TVP ended cooperation with Makłowicz. His show Makłowicz on the Road is shown on the Polish Food Network.

In 2020 Makłowicz created his own channel on YouTube. Between 2020–2021, he hosted a music programme entitled "From punk rock to Bartók" on internet radio station Newonce.radio. In March 2024, he was appointed by then-mayor of Kraków Jacek Majchrowski as a member of the Council of the Historical Museum of Kraków.

== Personal life ==
He has a younger sister named Dominika. In 1991, he married Agnieszka Pogoda with whom he has two sons: Mikołaj (born 1992) and Ferdynand (born 1996). Makłowicz is Armenian Catholic.

His grandfather's brother was Volodymyr Moklovych, a former combat officer of the Ukrainian nationalist UVO District Command in Stanisławów and a member of the OUN in Belgium. After the war Robert's father used to live with him until his departure to Poland.

== In popular culture ==
His characteristic voice, quotes and videos posted on the internet have become the inspiration for numerous internet memes and parodies in Poland. Makłowicz has responded positively to the widespread attention he has received in Polish popular culture.

In 2022, a Kraków researcher discovered two new species of tardigrade and named one of them Mesobiotus maklowiczi in honour of the TV chef.

In 2024, Kraków's Public Transport Authority informed that Makłowicz's voice would be used in the public transportation service in the city. His voice recordings will announce bus and tram stops as well as make other important announcements to the passengers. Makłowicz offered his voice services for free.

== Recognition ==
=== Honours ===
- 2004: Silver Cross of Merit (Poland)
- 2021: Hungarian Gold Cross of Merit (Hungary)
- 2024: Decoration of Honour for Services to the Republic of Austria (Austria)
- 2026: Order of the Croatian Interlace (Croatia)

=== Awards ===
- 2004: Wiktor Award
- 2004: Złoty Chmiel Award
- 2011: Silver Inkpot Literary Award for his book Cafe Museum

== Books ==
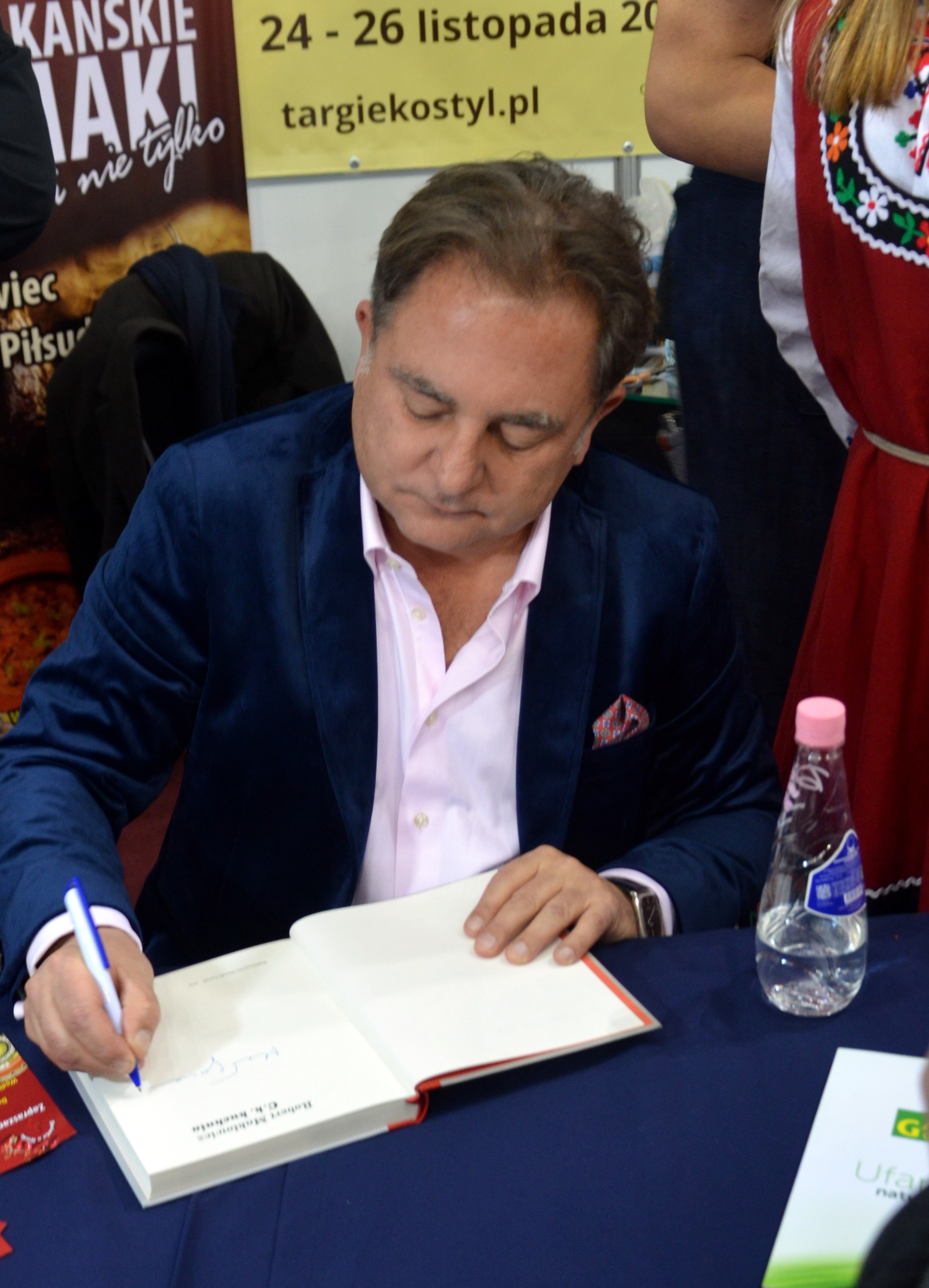
Makłowicz in 2017

Makłowicz also published a number of books on culinary traditions of his homeland, Galicia. The first of the series, the C.K. Kuchnia (K.u.K. Cuisine) became a nationwide best-seller. Other Robert Makłowicz's books:

- Zjeść Kraków (Eating Cracow, 2001) with Stanisław Mancewicz
- Dialogi języka z podniebieniem (Dialogues of a Tongue with a Palate, 2003) with Piotr Bikont
- Czy wierzyć platynowym blondynkom? (Do You Believe Platinum Blondes?, 2004)
- Kalendarz znaleziony w brytfannie (A Calendar Found in a Baking Tin, 2005)
- Podróże kulinarne Roberta Makłowicza. Smak Węgier (Robert Makłowicz's Culinary Travels. The Taste of Hungary, 2006)
- Stół z niepowyłamywanymi nogami (A Table without Broken legs, 2007) with Piotr Bikont
- Fuzja Smaków. Podróże kulinarne Roberta Makłowicza (The Fusion of Tastes. Robert Makłowicz's Culinary Travels, 2007)
- Cafe Museum (2010)
- Dalmacja. Książka kucharska (Dalmatia. The Cookery Book, 2016)

== Filmography ==
- 2023: Asterix & Obelix: The Middle Kingdom (voice role)

== See also ==
- Magda Gessler
- Polish cuisine
