= Tie Break (jazz ensemble) =

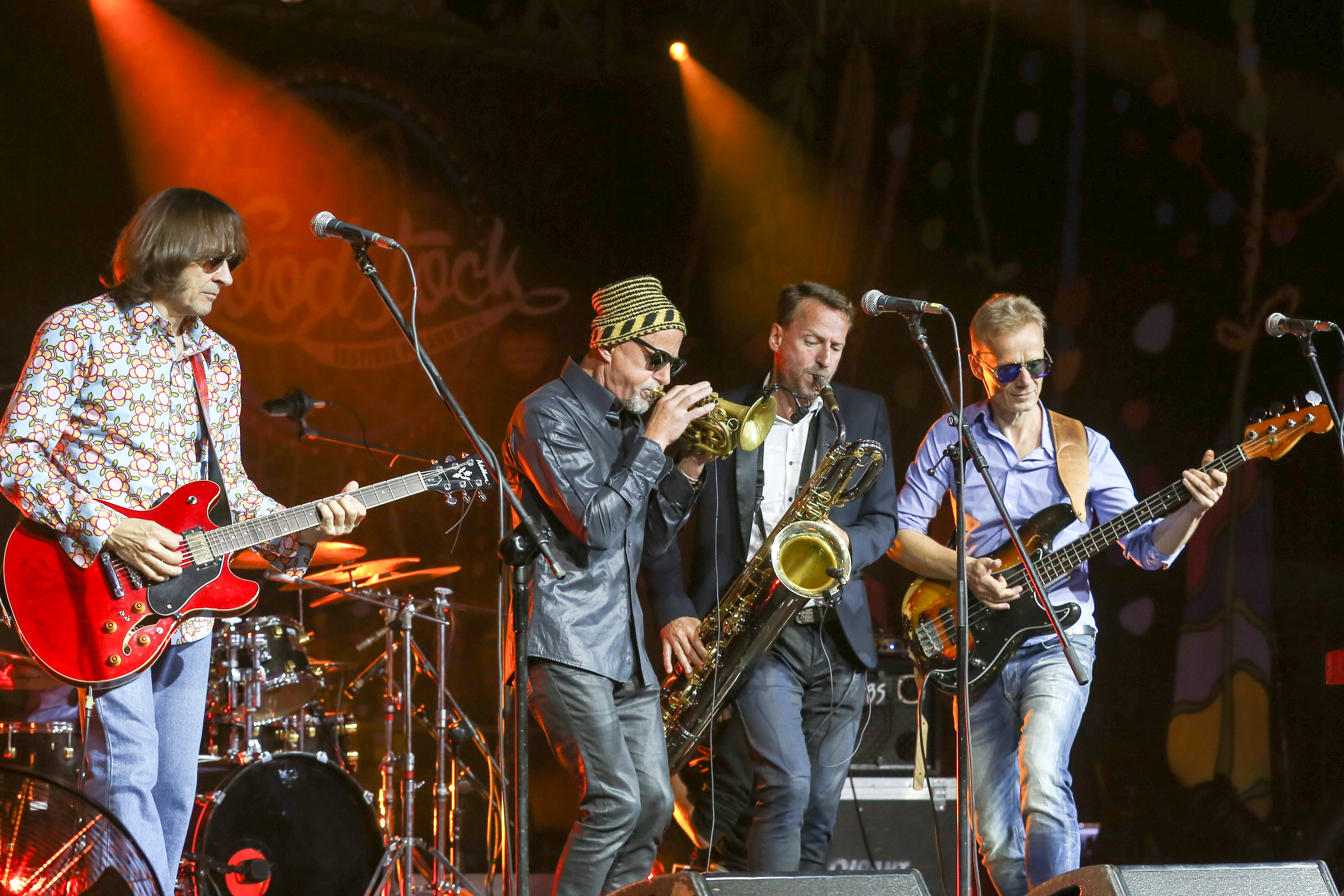
Tie Break at Przystanek Woodstock in 2016

Tie Break is a successful and "significant" Polish jazz rock group, formed in Częstochowa in 1977. The group was formed by guitarist Janusz Iwański and the bassist Krzysztof Majchrzak, and was soon joined by flute player Grzegorz Chmieleck. The current lineup includes Janusz Iwański, Marcin Pospieszalski, Antoni Gralak and Mateusz Pospieszalski. The group has performed at notable venues such as the Jazz Jamboree.

== Selected discography ==
- 1989 – Tie Break, Polskie Nagrania
- 1990 – Duch wieje, kędy chce – Edycja św. Pawła
- 1991 – Gin gi lob, Silton
- 1995 – Poezje ks. Jana Twardowskiego, Edycja św. Pawła
- 1995 – retrospekcja. koncert. Kraków (Soyka, Yanina i Tie Break), Pomaton
