= Piotr Bikont =

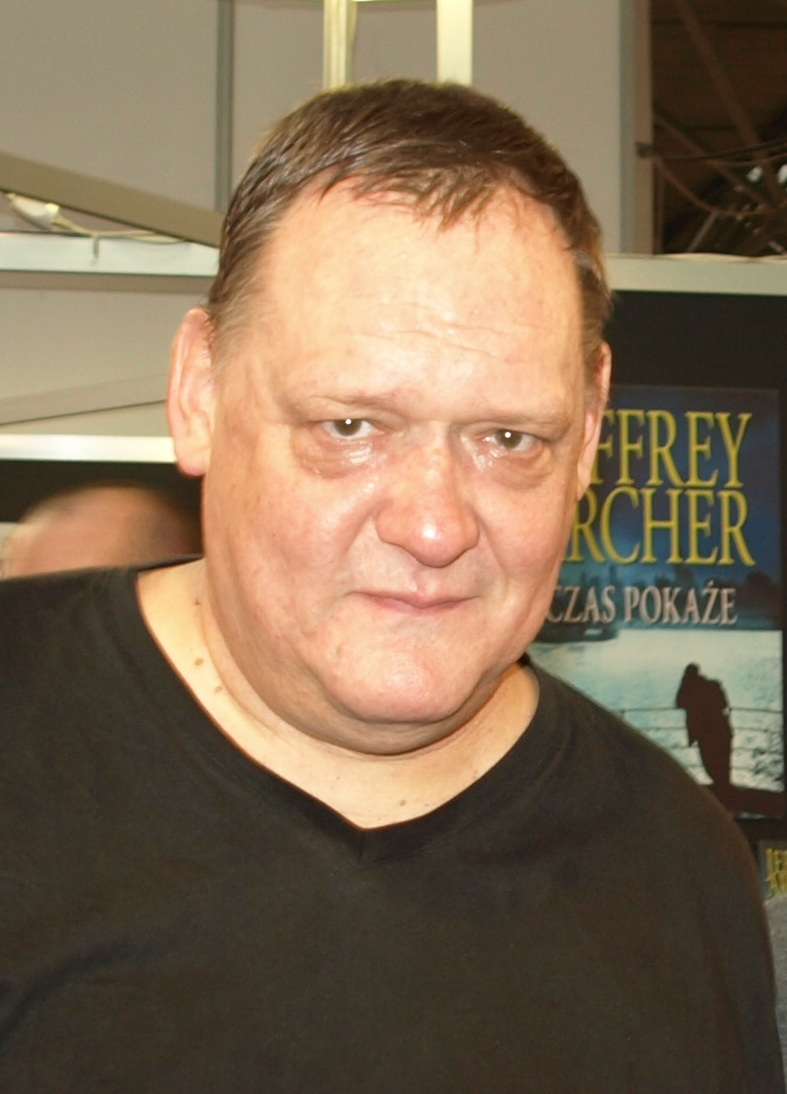
- Born: 12 May 1955; Poznań, Poland
- Died: 27 June 2017 (aged 62); Sosnowiec, Poland
- Occupations: Journalist, food critic, publicist

Piotr Bikont (12 May 1955 – 27 June 2017) was a Polish journalist, publicist, culinary critic and a theatre director.

Bikont translated Art Spiegelman's graphic novel Maus to Polish. He was a member of editorial staff of the talking magazine Gadający Pies based in Kraków, and the author of a book Jewish Cooking According to Balbina Przepiórko.

Bikont was married to journalist Anna Bikont, co-founder and editor of Tygodnik Mazowsze and Gazeta Wyborcza, with whom he had two children: Maniucha Bikont, an anthropologist and artist, and Aleksandra Bikont. He died on 27 June 2017 in a car accident. He was 62.
