= Janusz Iwański =

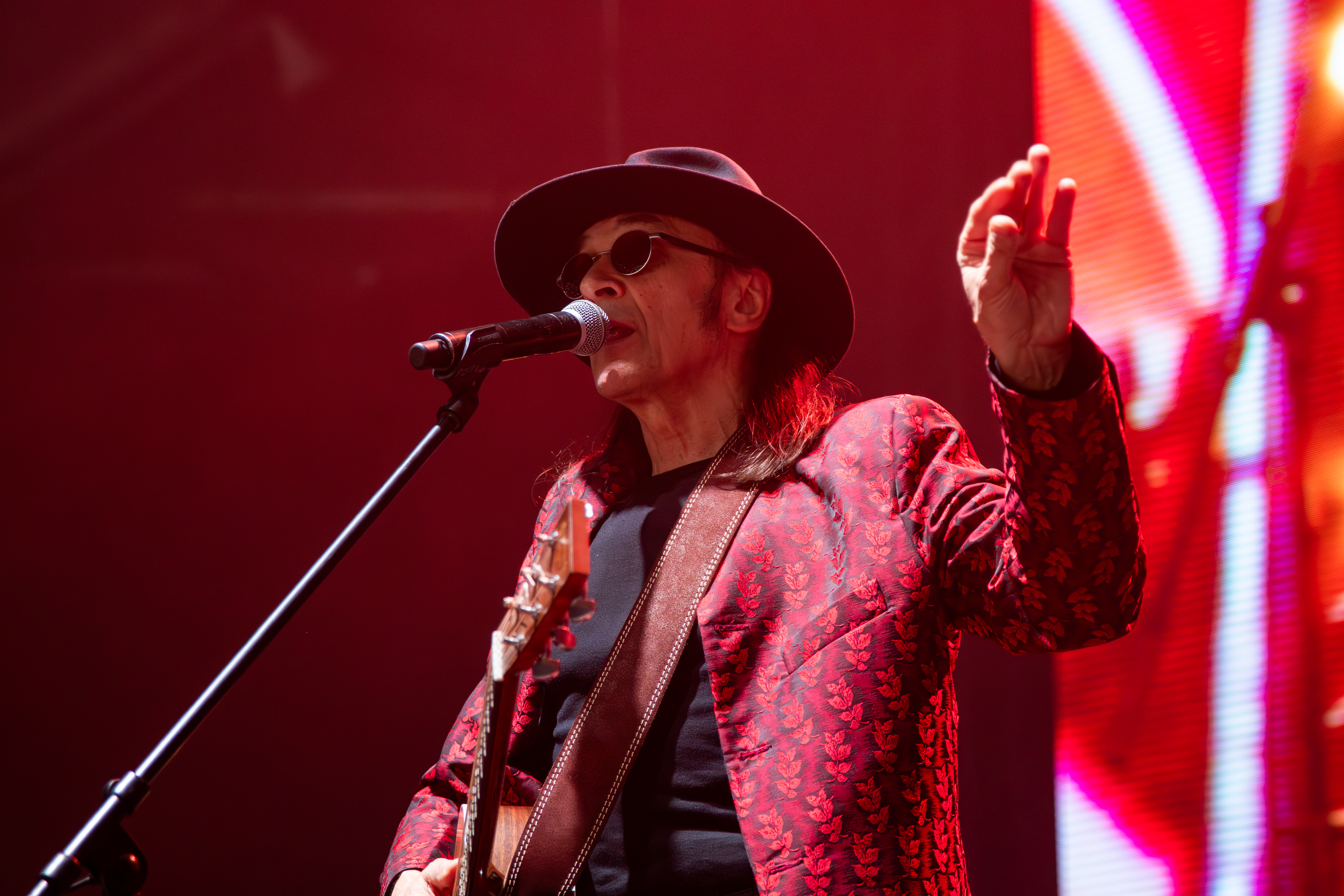
Janusz Iwański in 2025

Janusz Henryk Iwański, best known as Yanina, (April 22, 1956 in Częstochowa) is a Polish jazz and rock guitarist, composer, songwriter and vocalist. He has performed with the groups Tie Break, Soyka Yanina, and Maanam. Since 2007 he has been playing with the rock group, The Goodboys.

== Biography ==
He began as a musician in 1970 but in 1976 at the Jazz Jamboree, he heard artists such as Gil Evans, Benny Goodman, Muddy Waters and many others, took up the study of jazz itself. He has cited Miles Davis as an influence. As he became interested in jazz he formed the Tie Break with bassist Krzysztof Majchrzak, soon joined by flute player Grzegorz Chmielecki.

He has performed in countries such as Poland, Mexico, USA, Sweden, Denmark, Canada, Germany, Russia, the Czech Republic and Slovakia, Austria, Belgium, France, Greece, Italy, Georgia and others including in his native Częstochowa with over 3000 gigs in total. Iwański has performed at the "Umbria Jazz Festival" (1984), "European Jazz Festival-Athena", "Jazz Jamboree", "Era Jazzu", "Warsaw Summer Jazz Days", "Gdynia Summer Jazz Days", "Jazz Fair", "Jazz Jantar", "The British Fusion Festival in Silesia", "Jazz On Odra River", "Jazz Juniors" and many others. He has toured with people such as Tomasz Stańko and has also contributed to many theatrical and film works, with people such as Zbigniew Preisner.

== Selected discography ==
=== Tie Break ===
- Tie Break – Polskie Nagrania 1989
- Duch wieje kędy chce – Edycja Św. Pawła 1990
- Gin gi lob – Silton 1991
- Poezje ks. Jana Twardowskiego – Edycja Św. Pawła 1995

=== with Stanislaw Sojka ===
- STANISŁAW SOJKA & JANUSZ JANINA IWAŃSKI - In Concert, Polton 1990
- SOJKA – Acoustic – ZIC-ZAC 1991
- SOYKA YANINA-Neopositive – ESA 1992
- SOYKA YANINA & kompania-live w Remoncie 4 kwietnia 1993 r. (2 CD). ESA 1993
- SOYKAYANINA i kompania-Radical graża. ESA 1994
- Soyka, Yanina I Tie Break (jazz ensemble) – retrospekcja. koncert. Kraków – Pomaton 1995
- SOYKA SONETY SHAKESPEARE. Pomaton EMI 1996
- SOYKA "Jan Paweł II-Tryptyk Rzymski". WAM-Pomaton/EMI 2003

=== Yanina ===
- YANINA-Portret wewnętrzny. Pomaton-EMI 1995 r.
- KaPeLa YANINA – 2001. SelleS Enterprises 1999 r.
- YANINA & KaPeLa – Searchers for something... GOWI Records 2002 r.
- YANINA FREE WAVE – YANINA FREE WAVE - MTJ 2011 r.
- YANINA 4GramY – Kręci się - MTJ 2016 r.
