= Natasza Goerke =

Polish writer (born 1960)

Natasza Goerke (born 13 March 1962, in Poznań) is a Polish prose writer, essayist, and columnist, best known for her grotesque and surrealistic stories known for their black humour. She has written the books Fractale (1994), Księga pasztetów (1997), Pożegnania plazmy (1999), 47 na odlew (2002), and Tam (2017). She was nominated for a Nike Award in 2003 for her book 47 na odlew (2002).
